= Timeline of the 2022–2023 Brazilian coup plot =

The following article is a broad timeline covering events related to the 2022–2023 Brazilian coup plot. It covers both the chronology of the events themselves and that of the investigations, the trial, and post-trial developments.

== Military leaders under Bolsonaro ==
Minister of Defense	Commander of the Army	Commander of the Navy	Commander of the Air Force
Fernando Azevedo e Silva (2019–2021)	Edson Pujol (2019–2021)	Ilques Barbosa (2019–2021)	Antonio Carlos Moretti Bermudez (2019–2021)
Walter Braga Netto (2021–2022)	Paulo Sérgio Nogueira (2021–2022)	Almir Garnier Santos (2021–2022)	Carlos de Almeida Baptista Júnior (2021–2022)
Paulo Sérgio Nogueira (Apr – Dec 2022)	Marco Antônio Freire Gomes (Apr – Dec 2022)	Almir Garnier Santos (2021–2022)	Carlos de Almeida Baptista Júnior (2021–2022)

Color key

Commanders who resigned during the military crisis in 2021.
Commanders who agreed to the coup attempt in 2022.
Commanders who resisted the coup attempt in 2022.

== Detentions and custodial status ==
Timeline of detentions and custodial status of defendants from Group 1 Pre-trial detention Pre-trial house arrest House arrest Imprisonment after conviction Fugitive Serving in open regime

== 2021 ==
=== March ===
- 30 March: A military crisis was triggered when Brazil's highest military officials resigned over what has been described as President Jair Bolsonaro's attempts to politicize the armed forces.

=== August ===
- 4 August: Justice Alexandre de Moraes ordered that President Jair Bolsonaro be investigated in the inquiry examining the dissemination of false information about electronic voting machines and the electoral system. Moraes cites 11 possible crimes that Bolsonaro may have committed, including criminal association and incitement to subvert the political or social order.
- 16 August: The Institutional Security Secretary, General Augusto Heleno, said in an interview that Article 142 of the Constitution (Note: "Article 142. The Armed Forces, comprised of the Navy, the Army and the Air Force, are permanent and regular national institutions, organized on the basis of hierarchy and discipline, under the supreme authority of the president of the Republic, and are intended for the defense of the Country, for the guarantee of the constitutional powers, and, on the initiative of any of these, of law and order.") “can be used” in exceptional situations, but stated that he saw no reason for a military intervention at that moment. Heleno said that “the article does not say when the military should intervene, but it says it is to maintain the country’s stability. And it can happen anywhere. There is no planning.” He also added that he considers it “important to create a point of balance and to be careful not to commit excesses — by any branch of government. Intervention could happen in a more serious moment.”
- 20 August: President Jair Bolsonaro submitted to the Federal Senate a request to impeach Justice Alexandre de Moraes. Shortly afterward, the Supreme Federal Court released a statement repudiating Bolsonaro’s action. Senate President Rodrigo Pacheco said he saw no technical, legal, or political grounds for the request to move forward.

=== September ===
- 7 September: At a demonstration on Paulista Avenue on Independence Day, Bolsonaro called Supreme Court Justice Alexandre de Moraes a scoundrel and said he would no longer abide by his decisions. He also said, "I will only leave [the presidency] in prison, dead, or victorious. And I want to tell those scoundrels that I will never be arrested" and that "either the head of this power [the Judiciary] frames his own, or this power will suffer what we do not want".

== 2022 ==
=== July ===
- 5 July: Cabinet meeting where Bolsonaro discussed plans for a possible coup d'état and instructed ministers to raise doubts about the electoral process. At the meeting, the Chief Minister of the Institutional Security Bureau, General Augusto Heleno, said: 'If [we] have to turn the tables, it has to be before the elections."
- 18 July: Jair Bolsonaro spreads false information about electronic voting machines and attacks the Superior Electoral Court in a meeting with foreign ambassadors, which was broadcast on TV Brasil and on social media.

=== October ===
- 30 October: During the second round of the 2022 presidential election police operations were carried out by the Federal Police and the Federal Highway Police. They targeted public transportation vehicles, mainly in the country's Northeast Region, allegedly with the aim of ensuring transportation safety according to their supporters, or delaying the arrival of these vehicles at polling places according to critics. In the evening, Bolsonaro is defeated by Lula in the second round of the elections. Pro-coup demonstrations begin, with roadblocks and camps set up in front of Army barracks.

=== November ===
- 1 November: More than 44 hours after losing the elections, Jair Bolsonaro made a statement at Planalto Palace. He thanked the people who voted for him and said that "the current popular movements are the result of indignation and a sense of injustice over how the electoral process took place". He also said that he would "continue to abide by the Constitution".
- 9 November: According to the investigations, General Mario Fernandes drafted and printed inside the Planalto Palace the "Green and Yellow Dagger Plan", which foresaw the assassination of the elected president Lula, the elected vice president Alckmin, and Justice Alexandre de Moraes. Shortly after printing the document, Fernandes headed to the Alvorada Palace.
- 18 November: General Walter Braga Netto, Bolsonaro's running mate in the elections, addressed the president's supporters at the gates of the Alvorada Palace and said: "Do not lose faith. That is all I can say for now."

=== December ===
- 7 December: According to the investigations, President Jair Bolsonaro held a meeting at the Alvorada Palace with Minister of Defense Paulo Sérgio Nogueira and the commanders of the three Armed Forces, in which he presented a draft decree that provided for the declaration of a State of Defense and a State of Siege, as well as the creation of an "Electoral Regularity Commission". According to testimonies to the Federal Police, the Navy Commander, Admiral Almir Garnier, placed his forces at Bolsonaro's disposal. However, the Army Commander, General Freire Gomes, and the Air Force Commander, Lieutenant-Brigadier Batista Jr., opposed it. Freire Gomes allegedly threatened to arrest Bolsonaro if the plan went forward. Also present at the meeting were Lieutenant Colonel Mauro Cid, Minister of Justice Anderson Torres, and presidential aide Felipe Martins.
- 9 December: Faced with the refusal of the Army and the Air Force, Bolsonaro met with General Estevam Theóphilo, who headed the Army's Land Operations Command. According to the Federal Police, the general agreed to carry out the Army's actions and lead the ground troops in the coup attempt, provided Bolsonaro signed the decree. Later in the day, Bolsonaro broke his post-defeat silence after losing to Lula and spoke to supporters in front of the Alvorada Palace. On that occasion, he encouraged the coup-driven demonstrations held after the election, made references to the military, and said: "Nothing is lost. The end, only with death. Who decides my future, where I go, is you. Who decides where the Armed Forces go is you."
- 12 December: The Superior Electoral Court officially certified Lula and Alckmin's victory in the elections. Later that night, radical Bolsonaro supporters launched a series of acts of vandalism in Brasília, set fire to cars and buses, and attempted to storm the Federal Police headquarters.
- 14 December: According to the investigations, in a meeting at the Ministry of Defense headquarters with the presence of the commanders of the three armed forces, Defense Minister Paulo Sérgio Nogueira once again presented the text of the coup decree.
- 15 December: Audio recordings between Lieutenant Colonel Mauro Cid and Major Ailton Gomes discussing a coup d'état plan and the arrest of authorities. The two discussed trying to convince the Army commander, General Freire Gomes, to join the plan.
- 16 December: According to the investigations, General Mario Fernandes printed, from inside the Planalto Palace, a draft decree that would establish a Crisis Cabinet to be created following the eventual proclamation of the coup d'état. The Cabinet would be chaired by General Augusto Heleno, with General Braga Netto serving as coordinator.
- 24 December: Attempted bomb attack at Brasília International Airport by a group of members of the pro-coup demonstrations. A Bolsonaro supporter was caught in the act and arrested for terrorism and stated in testimony that the bomb was intended to “trigger chaos” that would lead to the declaration of a State of Siege.
- 30 December: One day before the end of his term, Bolsonaro left Brazil and traveled to the United States, where he remained for 90 days. According to subsequent Federal Police investigations, Bolsonaro traveled to the U.S. to avoid arrest and to wait for the outcome of what would become the 8 January attacks.

== 2023 ==
=== January ===
- 8 January: Invasion and vandalism of the National Congress, the Planalto Palace (Executive Office) and the Supreme Federal Court by a mob of radical Bolsonaro supporters. Soon after, President Lula decreed a federal intervention in the Public Security of the Federal District, removing former Minister of Justice Anderson Torres from his position as the District's Secretary of Justice.
- 9 January: Justice Alexandre de Moraes removed the Governor of the Federal District Ibaneis Rocha from office for 90 days. Moraes ruled that the DF government had been complicit in the coup supporters' attack. Moraes also ordered that Bolsonaro supporters' camps in front of the Army barracks be dismantled within 24 hours.
- 12 January: The Federal Police find the draft of a decree that would establish a "state of defense" to intervene in the Superior Electoral Court and declare Bolsonaro as president-elect in the home of former Minister of Justice Anderson Torres.
- 14 January: Former Minister of Justice Anderson Torres is arrested by the Federal Police after disembarking at Brasília airport.
- 21 January: President Lula dismissed the Army Commander, General Júlio César de Arruda. The government said the decision was motivated by a loss of confidence in the way the issue of the camps in front of the Army headquarters was handled. In his place, General Tomás Miguel Ribeiro Paiva was appointed.
- 23 January: Anderson Torres's first testimony to the Federal Police.

=== February ===
- 2 February: Anderson Torres's second testimony to the Federal Police.

=== April ===
- 19 April: The Chief Minister of the Institutional Security Bureau, General Gonçalves Dias, resigned after the press released footage showing him inside the Planalto Palace at the time of the 8 January attack.
- 26 April: Beginning of the Parliamentary Inquiry Committee to investigate the 8 January attacks.

=== May ===
- 11 May: Justice Alexandre de Moraes ordered the release of former minister Anderson Torres from prison. However, Torres will have to comply with precautionary measures and wear an electronic ankle monitor.

=== June ===
- 30 June: By a vote of 5 to 2, the Superior Electoral Court declared former President Jair Bolsonaro ineligible for eight years. The practice of abuse of political power and improper use of the media was recognized during a meeting held at the Palácio da Alvorada with foreign ambassadors on 18 July 2022.

=== August ===
- 9 August: Silvinei Vasques, former director of the Federal Highway Police, was arrested by the Federal Police.

=== September ===
- 7 September: Jair Bolsonaro's former aide-de-camp, Lieutenant Colonel Mauro Cid, enters into a plea bargain agreement.

=== October ===
- 18 October: Conclusion of the 8 January Parliamentary Inquiry Committee. Senator Eliziane Gama’s report was approved by 20 votes to 11 and formally charged 61 individuals, including former president Jair Bolsonaro.

== 2024 ==
=== February ===
- 8 February: Operation Tempus Veritatis begins. Bolsonaro had his passport seized by the Federal Police.
- 9 February: Video is released from the ministries meeting where the coup plan was discussed.

=== March ===
- 15 March: Former Army commander General Freire Gomes tells the Federal Police that Bolsonaro presented the draft of the intervention decree in the Superior Electoral Court to the commanders of the Armed Forces in late 2022.
- 25 March: The New York Times published an investigation, including a video, showing that former president Jair Bolsonaro spent two nights at the Hungarian Embassy in Brasília between 12–14 February, shortly after having his passport seized. The newspaper suggests that Bolsonaro attempted to evade justice.

=== August ===
- 8 August: Justice Alexandre de Moraes ordered the release of Silvinei Vasques, former director of the Federal Highway Police. Silvinei will be required to wear an electronic ankle monitor and comply with other restrictive measures.
- 27 August: The Brazilian Army opened a Military Police Inquiry (IPM) to investigate four military personnel for possible crimes related to the drafting of the "Letter to the Army Commander from Senior Active Officers of the Brazilian Army". This letter, according to investigations by the Federal Police, was used as an instrument of pressure on the then–army commander, General Freire Gomes, to support a coup d'état in 2022.

=== November ===
- 19 November: Operation Counter-coup begins. General Mario Fernandes, Lieutenant Colonel Helio Ferreira Lima, Major Rodrigo Bezerra Azevedo, Major Rafael Martins de Oliveira, and Federal Police officer Wladimir Matos Soares were arrested by the Federal Police.
- 21 November: The Federal Police formally accused Bolsonaro and 36 people (Operation Counter-coup) for an attempt to overthrow Brazil's democratic institutions, which included planning and ordering the assassination of President Lula, Vice President Alckmin and Supreme Court Justice Moraes in 2022 to keep Bolsonaro in power after his term would legally end.

=== December ===
- 14 December: Army General Walter Braga Netto, who was Bolsonaro's running mate in 2022 and a former minister of defense, was arrested by the Federal Police.

== 2025 ==
=== February ===
- 18 February: Prosecutor General Paulo Gonet formally indicted Bolsonaro for leading a criminal organization, an attempted coup d'état, and an attempt to violently abolish the democratic rule of law. Former Defense Minister Walter Braga Netto, former Minister of Institutional Security Augusto Heleno, former Navy Commander Almir Garinier, and 31 other individuals were also indicted.

=== March ===
- 26 March: The first panel of the Supreme Court unanimously decides to accept the Prosecutor General's complaint and consider Jair Bolsonaro and seven other allies (Group 1) as defendants for attempting a coup d'état.

=== April ===
- 22 April: The first panel of the Supreme Court unanimously decided to make the members of Group 2 defendants.

=== May ===
- 6 May: The first panel of the Supreme Court unanimously decided to make the members of Group 4 defendants.
- 18 May – 2 June: The Supreme Federal Court heard 52 witnesses, both for the defense and the prosecution.
- 20 May: The first panel of the Supreme Court unanimously decided to make the members of Group 3 defendants.

=== June ===
- 9–10 June: Justice Alexandre de Moraes, rapporteur of the case at the Federal Supreme Court, hears the testimonies of whistleblower Mauro Cid and the other 7 defendants from the Group 1 of the coup plot, including former president Jair Bolsonaro.

=== July ===
- 7 July: President of the United States Donald Trump wrote a post on Truth Social in defense of former president Bolsonaro. He said Bolsonaro was the target of persecution and the victim of a "witch hunt". Without mentioning Trump, President Lula da Silva said Brazil did not accept 'interference' from anyone.
- 8 July: Justice Alexandre de Moraes extends the deadline to conclude the Federal Police investigation against licensed congressman Eduardo Bolsonaro regarding his activity in the United States with the aim of pressuring the Trump administration to act against the Brazilian institutions and influence the progress of legal proceedings against his father, Jair Bolsonaro.
- 9 July: In a letter to President Lula, President Donald Trump once again defended Bolsonaro and criticized his trial as a "witch hunt". He then announced 50% tariffs on all Brazilian products, effective on 1 August.
- 14 July: Prosecutor General Paulo Gonet presented his closing arguments to the Supreme Court in the case and reiterated the request for the conviction of Jair Bolsonaro and the other seven defendants from the Group 1 of the coup plot. If convicted, Bolsonaro could face up to 43 years in prison.
- 17 July: Donald Trump sends a letter to Jair Bolsonaro saying again that he is the target of "attacks" from an "unfair system" and that the "trial must stop immediately".
- 18 July: Former president Bolsonaro was the target of a Federal Police search and seizure operation. The operation was authorized by Justice Alexandre de Moraes. His residence in Brasília, as well as the headquarters of his party, were searched. Moraes also ordered Bolsonaro to wear an ankle monitor and to be confined to his home at night and on weekends. Bolsonaro was also prohibited from using social media, contacting other defendants, and approaching foreign embassies or diplomats. Right after, U.S. Secretary of State Marco Rubio announced the revocation of the visas of 8 of the 11 justices of the Brazilian Supreme Court and their family members, including Moraes.
- 21 July: Justice Alexandre de Moraes published an order reinforcing the ban on former president Bolsonaro using social media directly or indirectly, which failure to comply with could result in preventive detention. Later that day, Moraes ordered the freezing of all assets and bank accounts of Congressman Eduardo Bolsonaro.
- 30 July: The Trump administration applied the Magnitsky Act against Justice Alexandre de Moraes. In a statement justifying the application of the law, U.S. Treasury Secretary Scott Bessent stated that Moraes "has assumed the responsibility of being judge and jury in an illegal witch hunt against American and Brazilian citizens and companies". Soon after, the White House released a statement confirming that President Trump had signed the executive order officially raising tariffs on Brazilian exports to 50%.

=== August ===
- 4 August: Justice Alexandre de Moraes ordered house arrest for former president Bolsonaro. In his ruling, Moraes stated that Bolsonaro violated the precautionary measures imposed by using the social media accounts of allies – including his three parliamentary sons – to disseminate messages with "clear content encouraging and instigating attacks on the Supreme Federal Court and overt support for foreign intervention in the Brazilian Judiciary". Moraes also prohibited Bolsonaro from receiving visitors, except for his lawyers, without authorization and from using a cell phone directly or indirectly.
- 18 August: Supreme Court Justice Flávio Dino ruled that laws or court decisions from other countries have no effect in Brazil unless validated by domestic courts. The decision has a direct impact on Brazilian banks restricting operations based on the Magnistky Act. Soon after, the U.S. Embassy in Brazil stated that Alexandre de Moraes is "toxic to all legitimate businesses and individuals seeking access to the United States and its markets" and that "those who provide material support to human rights violators may also be subject to sanctions".
- 20 August: The Federal Police formally charged former president Bolsonaro and his son, Congressman Eduardo Bolsonaro, with coercion of authorities — a form of obstruction of justice — and attempting to abolish the democratic rule of law. Messages, audio recordings, and documents seized from Jair Bolsonaro's cell phone in July were also declassified. One of the documents found was a letter requesting political asylum addressed to President of Argentina Javier Milei.
- 26 August: Justice Alexandre de Moraes ordered increased police presence at Jair Bolsonaro's house. The order requires the Federal District Penal Police to monitor Bolsonaro's ankle monitor around the clock and assign a police team "for real-time monitoring of the defendant's home address". Moraes granted the request from the Prosecutor General, which requested the reinforcement to prevent escape and ensure compliance with precautionary measures.

=== September ===
- 2 September: First day of the trial of Jair Bolsonaro and his allies from Group 1. Justice Alexandre de Moraes read his report summarizing the case, the evidence, and the arguments from both the prosecution and the defense. The Prosecutor General Paulo Gonet had two hours for his oral arguments advocating for the conviction of the defendants. The lawyers of Mauro Cid, Alexandre Ramagem, Almir Garnier, and Anderson Torres had one hour each for their oral arguments.
- 3 September: Second day of the trial. The lawyers of Augusto Heleno, Jair Bolsonaro, Paulo Sérgio Nogueira, and Walter Braga Netto had one hour each for their oral arguments.
- 7 September: At a demonstration on Paulista Avenue on Independence Day, the potential right-wing candidates for the 2026 elections — former First Lady Michelle Bolsonaro and Governors Tarcísio de Freitas and Romeu Zema — advocated an amnesty for Jair Bolsonaro and those convicted for the 8 January attacks. Tarcísio also said that "no one can stand Alexandre de Moraes's tyranny any more".
- 9 September: Third day of the trial. Justices Alexandre de Moraes and Flávio Dino voted for the conviction of Jair Bolsonaro and all the other defendants on every charge brought against them, with Dino voting for lighter sentences for Paulo Sérgio Nogueira, Augusto Heleno, and Alexandre Ramagem, on the grounds that they had a lesser degree of involvement in the scheme. Commenting on the trial, White House Press Secretary Karoline Leavitt stated that Donald Trump was "not afraid to use the economic and military power of the United States of America to protect freedom of speech around the world".
- 10 September: Fourth day of the trial. Justice Luiz Fux voted only to convict Mauro Cid and Braga Netto for attempted violent abolition of the democratic rule of law and voted to acquit all the other defendants on all charges.
- 11 September: Fifth day of the trial. Justices Cármen Lúcia and Cristiano Zanin voted for the conviction of Jair Bolsonaro and all the other defendants on every charge. Soon after, the justices sentenced Jair Bolsonaro to 27 years and 3 months in prison. Commenting on the trial, President Donald Trump said he was "surprised" and "very dissatisfied" with Bolsonaro's conviction. He further stated that the proceedings were "very similar" to what they tried to do to him. Secretary of State Marco Rubio said that the United States "will respond accordingly to this witch hunt".
- 17 September: The Chamber of Deputies approved the fast-track procedure for the amnesty bill for those convicted in the 8 January attacks.
- 22 September: The Trump administration applied the Magnitsky Act against Viviane Barci de Moraes, wife of Justice Alexandre de Moraes, and against the law firm in which they are both partners. Prosecutor General Paulo Gonet formally charged Congressman Eduardo Bolsonaro with coercion of authorities for lobbying the U.S. government to sanction members of the Brazilian judiciary.

=== October ===
- 6 October: Presidents Lula and Donald Trump spoke for the first time in a roughly 30-minute video call. The conversation was described as “cordial and friendly.”
- 13 October: Justice Alexandre de Moares denied the request from Jair Bolsonaro's defense to revoke his house arrest and the precautionary measures imposed against him. Moraes stated that house arrest remains "necessary and appropriate" given Bolsonaro's risk of flight.
- 21 October: The First Panel of the Supreme Court convicted, by a 4–1 vote, all seven defendants from Group 4, responsible for producing and spreading disinformation related to the coup plot.
- 22 October: The Supreme Court has officially published the ruling of the trial that convicted former President Jair Bolsonaro and his allies. The defense teams of all defendants have five days to file appeals.
- 26 October: Presidents Lula and Donald Trump met at the ASEAN summit in Malaysia. The relationship between both countries, the 50% tariff on Brazilian products, and the application of the Magnitsky Act against Brazilian officials were discussed.

=== November ===
- 7 November: The First Panel of the Supreme Court unanimously rejected the appeals filed by the defense of former president Jair Bolsonaro and the other members of Group 1.
- 14 November: The First Panel of the Supreme Court unanimously accepted the Prosecutor General's complaint against Congressman Eduardo Bolsonaro for coercion of authorities and ruled that he must stand trial.
- 18 November: The Supreme Court officially published the First Panel's ruling denying the appeals filed by former President Jair Bolsonaro and his allies from the Group 1. The defenses teams of all defendants have five days to present a second and final appeal. Later in the day, the First Panel unanimously convicted 9 of the 10 defendants from Group 3, responsible for the execution actions in the coup plot.
- 21 November: The defense of former president Jair Bolsonaro formally requested that Justice Alexandre de Moraes maintain his house arrest on humanitarian grounds. The lawyers argue that Bolsonaro is not in sufficient health to go to prison due to the aftereffects of his attempted assassination in 2018. Later in the day, Moraes ordered the arrest of Alexandre Ramagem due to his departure from Brazil to the United States without authorization after his 16-year conviction. The Federal Police asked Interpol to place Ramagem's name on its wanted list.
- 22 November: Justice Alexandre de Moares ordered the arrest of former President Jair Bolsonaro. The Federal Policie carried out the order at 6 a.m, and took the former president to its headquarters in Brasília. In the ruling, Moraes cited flight risk and the fact that Bolsonaro had attempted to remove his electronic ankle monitor using a soldering iron during the night.
- 24 November: The First Panel of the Supreme Court unanimously voted to keep former president Jair Bolsonaro detained.
- 25 November: Justice Alexandre de Moraes ruled that the second set of appeals filed by the defense was not admissible, declared the case to have reached res judicata and ordered the beginning of the enforcement of the prison sentence for all the defendants in Group 1.

=== December ===
- 2 December: The Federal District’s Criminal Enforcement Court submitted a document to the Supreme Federal Court regarding former president Jair Bolsonaro’s prison-sentence enforcement regime. The document sets the starting date as August 4, when he was placed under preventive house arrest. According to the report, Bolsonaro may leave prison under the closed regime and progress to the semi-open regime on April 23, 2033, after serving one-quarter of his sentence. After that, he may progress to the open regime under parole on March 17, 2037. The sentence will only be fully served on November 4, 2052.
- 5 December: Senator Flávio Bolsonaro confirmed that his father, former president Jair Bolsonaro, chose him to run for the presidency in the 2026 elections. Flávio stated that the price for withdrawing his candidacy is a broad amnesty for those convicted in the coup plot and his father being allowed to run. Later that day, the First Panel unanimously convicted 5 of the 7 former members of the top leadership of the Federal District Military Police for having failed to carry out their duties during the 8 January 2023 attacks.
- 10 December: Chamber of Deputies approved, by 291 votes to 148, a light version of the amnesty bill, which does not pardon the penalties but reduces the sentences of those convicted in the coup plot and the 8 January rioters. The bill still have to be approved by the Senate.
- 12 December: The Trump administration revoked the sanctions imposed under the Magnitsky Act against Justice Alexandre de Moraes and his wife. President Lula publicly thanked Trump and stated that this was “a victory for Brazilian democracy,” while Moraes said that “the truth has prevailed.”
- 16 December: The First Panel unanimously convicted 5 of the 6 defendants from Group 2, responsible for the management of operation actions in the coup plot.
- 17 December: The Federal Senate approved, by 48 votes to 25, the sentence reduction bill for those convicted in the coup plot and the 8 January rioters. If signed into law, the bill could reduce Bolsonaro’s sentence from 27 to about 21 years, and his time in a closed-regime prison from 7 to approximately 3 years. President Lula has yet to decide whether to sign or veto the bill.
- 18 December: The President of the Chamber of Deputies, Hugo Motta, declared the loss of the congressional seats of Eduardo Bolsonaro and Alexandre Ramagem. Eduardo exceeded the maximum number of absences allowed because he has been in the United States in “self-imposed exile” since February. Ramagem, in turn, had his mandate revoked by the Supreme Court following his conviction for his role in the coup plot.
- 19 December: Following a medical examination by the Federal Police, Justice Alexandre de Moraes authorized former president Jair Bolsonaro to undergo surgery to correct a bilateral inguinal hernia. The surgical procedure is scheduled to take place on December 25. This will be the eighth abdominal surgery Bolsonaro has undergone since he was stabbed in an attempted assassination in September 2018. In the same decision, Moraes once again denied the defense's request for the granting of house arrest.
- 22 December: Justice Alexandre de Moraes granted humanitarian house arrest to Augusto Heleno. Moraes made the decision after a medical report by the Federal Police confirmed a diagnosis of Alzheimer’s disease and other comorbidities. Heleno will be required to wear an electronic ankle monitor and comply with other precautionary measures.
- 25 December: Former President Jair Bolsonaro released a handwritten letter shortly before undergoing the surgery. In the letter, Bolsonaro reaffirms his endorsement of his son Flávio as his candidate for president in the 2026 election.
- 26 December: Silvinei Vasques, former director of the Federal Highway Police sentenced to 24 years in the Group 2 trial of the coup plot for his leadership of police operations during the 2022 elections, was arrested in Paraguay. Silvinei was attempting to board a flight to El Salvador using a fake Paraguayan passport.
- 27 December: Justice Alexandre de Moraes ordered the preventive house arrest of Filipe Martins, Marília de Alencar (Group 2); Bernardo Corrêa, Sergio Cavaliere, Fabrício de Bastos (Group 3); Angelo Denicoli, Giancarlo Rodrigues, Guilherme Almeida, Ailton Barros, and Carlos Cesar Moretzsohn (Group 4). In the decision, Moraes justified these arrest orders as a means to prevent further attempts to flee.

== 2026 ==
=== January ===
- 1 January: Former president Jair Bolsonaro has been discharged from the hospital after eight days of hospitalization. Justice Alexandre de Moraes once again denied the request for house arrest and ordered Bolsonaro to return to Federal Police custody.
- 2 January: Justice Alexandre de Moraes ordered the arrest of Filipe Martins after he violated precautionary measures.
- 8 January: At a ceremony remembering the 8 January attacks, President Lula officially vetoed the sentence-reduction bill. Congress may still override the veto with an absolute majority vote in both chambers.
- 15 January: Justice Alexandre de Moraes ordered the transfer of former President Jair Bolsonaro to the Federal District's 19th Military Police Battalion at the Papuda Penitentiary Complex. Moraes determined that Bolsonaro be held in a “state quarters” room, with better conditions suited to his health condition.

=== February ===
- 3 February: The Prosecutor General of Military Justice, Clauro Roberto de Bortolli, formally requested the Superior Military Court to strip the ranks and expel from the Armed Forces Captain Jair Bolsonaro, Generals Walter Braga Netto, Augusto Heleno and Paulo Sérgio Nogueira, and Admiral Almir Garnier. If convicted, in addition to the loss of rank, the expelled military officers would also forfeit their pensions, as well as the privilege of being detained in military facilities. The trial is expected to take place in late 2026.
- 6 February: Following a request by Justice Alexandre de Moraes, the Federal Police released the medical examination report conducted on former President Jair Bolsonaro. The report indicates that Bolsonaro has several comorbidities, including arterial hypertension, sleep apnea syndrome, clinical obesity, gastric reflux, systemic atherosclerosis and neurological alterations. However, the physicians stated that he has adapted well to the cell at the Papuda Penitentiary Complex and is medically fit to remain detained at that facility. Justice Moraes granted a five-day deadline for the Prosecutor General and Bolsonaro’s defense attorneys to submit their statements regarding the report.
- 19 February: The Supreme Court has formally initiated criminal proceedings against Eduardo Bolsonaro for obstruction of justice and coercion of authorities. The Court now has the option of requesting Eduardo’s extradition even before the trial takes place.
- 20 February: The Prosecutor General Paulo Gonet officially opposed granting house arrest to former president Jair Bolsonaro. Gonet formally presented his opinion to the Supreme Court and stated that the Federal Police report shows that Bolsonaro’s health condition is under control and can be adequately treated at the Papuda Penitentiary Complex.

=== March ===
- 2 March: Justice Alexandre de Moraes denied the request for humanitarian house arrest for former president Jair Bolsonaro. Moraes held that the Federal Police medical report shows that Bolsonaro’s health condition is stable and that he has full access to adequate medical treatment in prison. Moraes further stated that Bolsonaro’s prior attempt to remove with his electronic ankle monitor was another reason to deny house arrest.
- 5 March: The First Panel of the Supreme Court unanimously upheld Justice Alexandre de Moraes’s decision to deny humanitarian house arrest to former president Jair Bolsonaro.
- 13 March: Former president Jair Bolsonaro was taken to the hospital and admitted to the ICU after feeling unwell during the night. He experienced dizziness, high fever, a drop in oxygen saturation, and chills. He was diagnosed with bacterial bronchopneumonia. According to the doctors, Bolsonaro's clinical condition is considered serious but stable, and he remains at risk of death. Later in the day, Justice Alexandre de Moraes ruled that the second set of appeals filed by the defenses of Group 3 was not admissible, declared the case to have reached res judicata, and ordered the beginning of the enforcement of the prison sentence for all the convicted defendants.
- 17 March: The defense of former president Jair Bolsonaro once again requested that Justice Alexandre de Moraes grant humanitarian house arrest. According to his lawyers, Bolsonaro requires “frequent clinical monitoring.” Later, Senator Flávio Bolsonaro stated that he met with Moraes to discuss his father’s request for house arrest, saying that the conversation “was straightforward.”
- 20 March: Justice Alexandre de Moraes requests that the Prosecutor General’s Office submit its opinion on Jair Bolsonaro’s request for humanitarian house arrest.
- 23 March: Prosecutor General Paulo Gonet officially expressed support for granting house arrest to former president Jair Bolsonaro. Gonet stated that the “clinical evolution of the former president, as described by the medical team that treated him in the latest incident, recommends the easing of the custodial regime.”
- 24 March: Justice Alexandre de Moraes granted former president Jair Bolsonaro 90 days of temporary humanitarian house arrest, to be counted from his discharge from the hospital. After this period, a medical examination will be conducted to determine whether the measure remains necessary or whether Bolsonaro is fit to return to prison. Moraes also ordered that Bolsonaro must wear an electronic ankle monitor, may not receive visitors except for family members and lawyers, and may not have any contact with mobile phones or social media. Any violation of these measures will result in Bolsonaro being immediately returned to prison.
- 27 March: Former president Jair Bolsonaro was discharged after 14 days in the hospital. He then went to the Federal Police to have an electronic ankle monitor fitted and proceeded to his home, where he will serve 90 days of house arrest. Bolsonaro’s medical team is also expected to send weekly reports on the former president’s health condition to Justice Alexandre de Moraes.

=== April ===
- 13 April: Former federal deputy Alexandre Ramagem was arrested by ICE in the United States. He had been a fugitive from Brazilian justice since November 2025.
- 15 April: After two days in detention, Alexandre Ramagem was released by ICE. Ramagem has filed for political asylum in the United States and is not expected to be extradited until his request is reviewed by the US authorities.
- 30 April: Congress overrode President Lula’s veto of the sentence-reduction bill by 49–24 votes in the Senate and 318–144 votes in the Chamber of Deputies. As enacted, the law unifies penalties for attempted coup d’état and attempted violent abolition of the democratic rule of law by applying the higher sentence increased by one sixth to one half, and reduces the sentence-progression requirement for those convicted of these two crimes from one quarter to one sixth of the prison term for transfer from a closed to a semi-open regime. The reduction in sentences is not automatic, and the Supreme Court will have to recalculate the sentences of all convicted individuals on a case-by-case basis under the new legislation.

=== May ===
- 8 may: Former President Jair Bolsonaro's defense filed a criminal review petition before the Supreme Federal Court challenging his conviction. A criminal review is a legal action that may be filed by the defense at any time after the conviction has become final and unappealable, with the purpose of annulling the conviction, changing the legal classification of the offenses, or reducing the sentence.
- 9 May: Justice Alexandre de Moraes suspended the immediate enforcement of the Sentence-Reduction Act until the Supreme Court rules on the constitutionality of the legislation. Moraes granted a request from a constitutional challenge filed by the PSOL–Rede Federation.
- 11 May: Prosecutor General Paulo Gonet submitted his final arguments to the Supreme Federal Court, requesting the conviction of former congressman Eduardo Bolsonaro for coercion of public officials due to his activities in the United States in coordination with the Trump administration. If convicted, Eduardo could face a prison sentence of between one and four years.
- 12 May: Justice Kassio Nunes Marques was randomly selected as the rapporteur for Bolsonaro’s criminal review petition. Regardless of the rapporteur’s decision, the review must be judged by the Court’s full bench, composed of all the justices. If the review is ultimately granted, the defendant may be acquitted, or the Court may alter the classification of the offense, modify the sentence, or annul the proceedings. Under no circumstances, however, may the sentence be increased.

=== June ===
- 16 June: The First Panel of the Supreme Court unanimously convicted former federal deputy Eduardo Bolsonaro of coercion in the course of judicial proceedings. The conviction was supported by Justice Alexandre de Moraes, the rapporteur, and joined by Justices Cristiano Zanin, Cármen Lúcia, and Flávio Dino. The Panel found that Eduardo had acted to intimidate members of the Court and interfere with the judicial process by coordinating with the Trump government to impose tariffs on Brazil and sanctions against public officials. The Panel subsequently sentenced Eduardo to 4 years and 2 months in prison, to be served initially under a semi-open regime, and disqualified him from holding public office for eight years following the completion of his sentence. Later that day, Prosecutor-General Paulo Gonet formally recommended that Justice Nunes Marques reject Jair Bolsonaro's petition for criminal review. Gonet argued that Bolsonaro's conviction was supported by a "robust body of evidence" and that the petition amounted to nothing more than an expression of "dissatisfaction" with the Court's ruling.
- 18 June: Prosecutor-General Paulo Gonet formally presented his opinion to the Supreme Court in defense of the constitutionality of the Sentence-Reduction Act, urging the Court to reject the requests seeking to suspend the law. Gonet argued that the Legislative Branch has constitutional autonomy and a "margin of discretion" to define the country's criminal policy and sentencing criteria.
- 24 June: The Superior Military Court unanimously rejected a motion filed by former President Jair Bolsonaro's defense seeking to disqualify Justice Francisco Joseli Parente from the case. Bolsonaro's lawyers argued that Parente had previously expressed support for punishing military personnel involved in the January 8 riots and was therefore biased in ruling on the possible revocation of Bolsonaro's military rank.

=== July ===
- 3 July: Justice Alexandre de Moraes ordered the extension of former President Jair Bolsonaro's humanitarian house arrest.
- 13 July: Justice Alexandre de Moraes suspended for 90 days the authorization allowing Senator Flávio Bolsonaro to visit his father, former President Jair Bolsonaro. Moraes made the decision after Flávio posted on his social media accounts a handwritten letter by Jair Bolsonaro, titled "Letter to the Brazilian People", in which Bolsonaro reaffirmed his support for Flávio's presidential candidacy. Moraes stated that this violated the ban on Bolsonaro's use of social media, whether directly or through third parties.
- 17 July: Justice Alexandre de Moraes once again decided to keep former President Jair Bolsonaro under house arrest following the "Letter to the Brazilian People" episode. However, Moraes maintained the 90-day suspension of visits by Flávio Bolsonaro and suspended all other visits for 30 days, except those by medical professionals and lawyers. He also prohibited visits for political or electoral purposes until the end of the October elections, as well as the dissemination of political or electoral statements, including by third parties and regardless of the means used. As a consequence, Moraes barred the visit to Bolsonaro requested by Argentine President Javier Milei.

=== August ===
- 12 August: The Prosecutor-General Paulo Gonet asked the Federal Supreme Court to reject appeals filed by former President Jair Bolsonaro's defense and to maintain the 90-day suspension of visits by Senator Flávio Bolsonaro to his father.

=== September ===
- 18 September: The First Panel of the Supreme Federal Court unanimously rejected an appeal filed by former congressman Eduardo Bolsonaro's defense against his conviction for coercion in an attempt to interfere with the trial of the coup plot case. The Panel upheld his sentence of 4 years and 2 months, as well as his ineligibility to run for office for 8 years after serving his sentence.
- 25 September: Former President Jair Bolsonaro's defense team filed a new petition for criminal review and withdrew its earlier petition. In the new filing, Bolsonaro's lawyers reiterate their arguments for annulling the trial and add "new facts" based on what they consider new positions taken by the Court and the Prosecutor General's Office in the Banco Master scandal case. According to the defense, the arguments presented at the 15 September 2026 session, which began considering a request to open an investigation into Justice Alexandre de Moraes over his ties to Daniel Vorcaro, "proved to be in absolute contradiction with what was decided in the criminal case that convicted President Bolsonaro." His defense team also requested an injunction for his provisional release from prison while the petition is pending.

=== October ===
- 8 october: Justice Alexandre de Moraes declared that the coercion conviction of former congressman Eduardo Bolsonaro had become res judicata and ordered him to begin serving his sentence of 4 years and 2 months. Moraes also ordered the cancellation of all of Eduardo’s passports. Eduardo has been in the United States since March 2025.

=== November ===
- 12 November: Prosecutor General Paulo Gonet has told the Supreme Federal Court hat he opposes the second request for criminal review filed by former President Jair Bolsonaro's defense. Gonet argued that the defense had not presented any grounds that would justify overturning the conviction, that no harm to Bolsonaro's defense had been shown to have occurred during the coup plot trial, and that the verdict was supported by a wide range of evidence.

== Notes ==
Notes
