= Army High Command =

Commander of the Brazilian Army
- Comandante do Exército Brasileiro

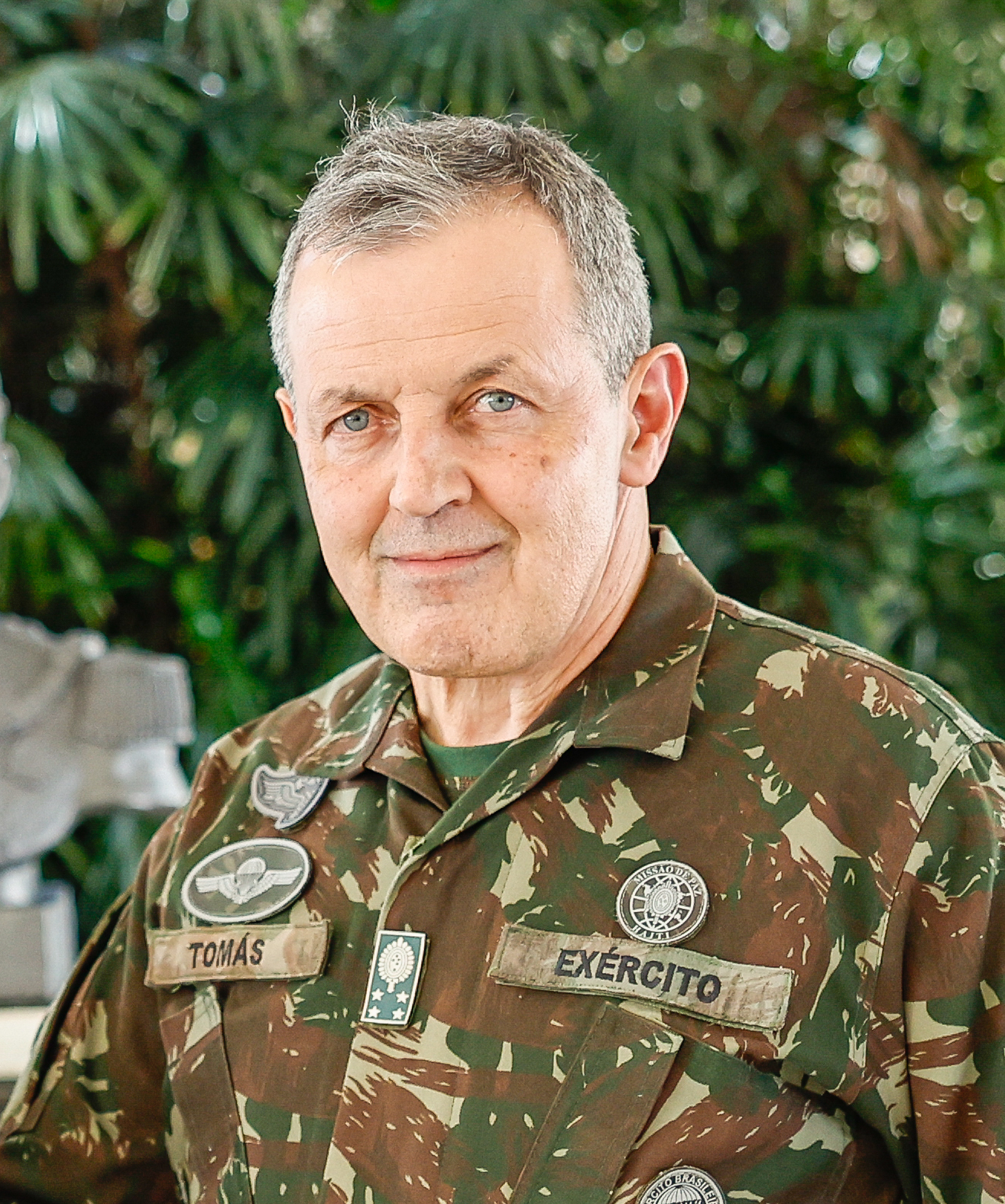
- Incumbent; Tomás Miguel Ribeiro Paiva since 21 January 2023
- Ministry of Defence
- Abbreviation: Commander of the Army
- Member of: Army High Command
- Reports to: Minister of Defence
- Nominator: Minister of Defence
- Appointer: President of Brazil
- Formation: 10 March 1808
- First holder: Rodrigo de Sousa Coutinho
- Website: Official website

The Army High Command (Portuguese: Alto Comando do Exército; ACE) of Brazil is composed of the Army Commander (Comandante do Exército) and the army generals (four-star generals) who are on active duty. Currently, there are fifteen positions for army generals in the Brazilian Army, in addition to one position in the Ministry of Defence. Occasionally, when the Army is responsible for the Head of Education and Culture of the Ministry of Defense, the position is held by an army general who also has a seat on the ACE.

This collegiate body is responsible for the main decisions of the Land Force, including the preparation of promotion lists for general officers, which are later submitted for approval by the President of the Republic.

Within the former Ministry of the Army, the ACE and the Army General Staff were the two prominent general leadership bodies. It “consisted of meetings of the military high command, the hard and restricted core, made up of members of the highest positions in the Army,” discussing the Army’s political decisions and ensuring the minister’s disciplined command of the troops. Division and brigade generals could participate to provide advice on specific matters.

== Organization of the Army High Command ==
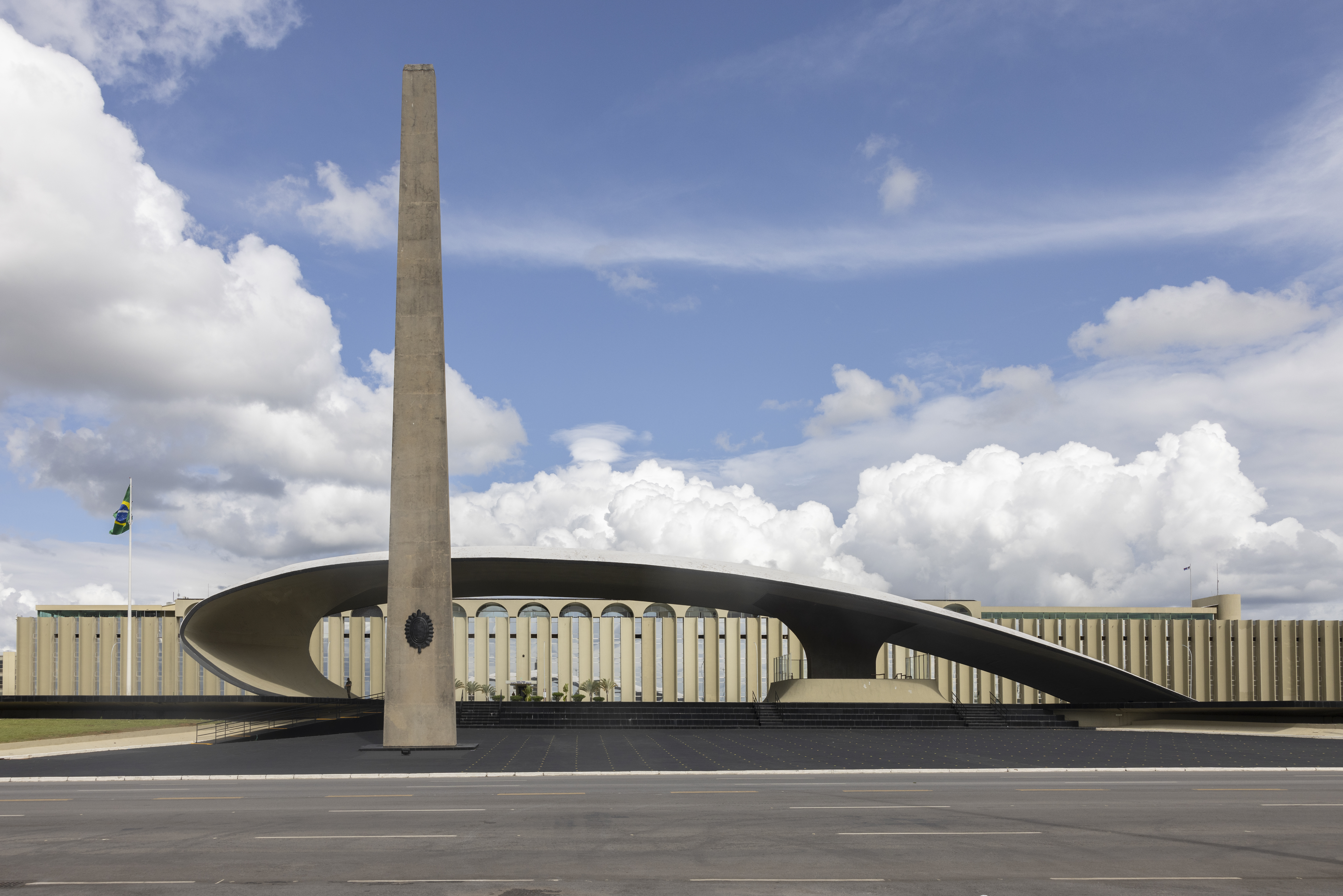
Army High Command HQ in Brasília

The current posts of active Brazilian generals:

Coat of Arms	Position	Incumbent
	Army Commander	General; Tomás Miguel Ribeiro Paiva
	Chief of the Army General Staff	General; Fernando José Sant'Ana Soares e Silva
	Chief of the Land Operations Command	General; Estevam Cals Theophilo Gaspar de Oliveira
	Chief of the General Department of Personnel	General; João Chalella Júnior
	Chief of the Department of Education and Culture	General; Richard Fernandez Nunes
	Chief of the Department of Science and Technology of the Army	General; Achilles Furlan Neto
	Chief of the Logistics Command	General; Laerte de Souza Santos
	Chief of the Department of Engineering and Construction	General; Anisio David de Oliveira Junior
	Chief of the Secretariat of Economy and Finance	General; Sergio da Costa Negraes
	Commander of the Amazon Military Region	General; Ricardo Augusto Ferreira Costa Neves
	Commander of the Northern Military Region	General; Luciano Guilherme Cabral Pinheiro
	Commander of the Northeastern Military Region	General; Kleber Nunes de Vasconcellos
	Commander of the Western Military Region	General; Luiz Fernando Estorilho Baganha
	Commander of the Eastern Military Region	General; André Luís Novaes Miranda
	Commander of the Southeastern Military Region	General; Guido Amin Naves
	Commander of the Southern Military Region	General; Hertz Pires do Nascimento

== List of Commanders ==
No.	Portrait	Commander	Took office	Left office	Time in office	
1	Gleuber Vieira	Gleuber Vieira (1933–2025)	10 June 1999	1 January 2003	3 years, 205 days	Fernando Henrique Cardoso (PSDB)
2	Francisco Roberto de Albuquerque	Francisco Roberto de Albuquerque (born 1937)	1 January 2003	8 March 2007	4 years, 66 days	Luiz Inácio Lula da Silva (PT)
3	Enzo Martins Peri	Enzo Martins Peri (born 1941)	8 March 2007	5 February 2015	7 years, 334 days	Luiz Inácio Lula da Silva (PT); Dilma Rousseff (PT)
4	Eduardo Villas Bôas	Eduardo Villas Bôas (born 1951)	5 February 2015	11 January 2019	3 years, 340 days	Dilma Rousseff (PT); Michel Temer (MDB)
5	Edson Leal Pujol	Edson Leal Pujol (born 1955)	11 January 2019	20 April 2021	2 years, 99 days	Jair Bolsonaro (PSL)
6	Paulo Sérgio Nogueira de Oliveira	Paulo Sérgio Nogueira de Oliveira (born 1958)	20 April 2021	31 March 2022	345 days	Jair Bolsonaro (Ind)
7	Marco Antônio Freire Gomes	Marco Antônio Freire Gomes (born 1957)	31 March 2022	30 December 2022	274 days	Jair Bolsonaro (PL)
8	Júlio Cesar de Arruda	Júlio Cesar de Arruda (born 1959)	30 December 2022	21 January 2023	22 days	Luiz Inácio Lula da Silva (PT)
9	Tomás Ribeiro Paiva	Tomás Ribeiro Paiva (born 1960)	21 January 2023	Incumbent	3 years, 228 days	Luiz Inácio Lula da Silva (PT)

== See also ==
- Future of the Brazilian Army
