= Tereza de Arriaga =

Portuguese artist (1915–2013)

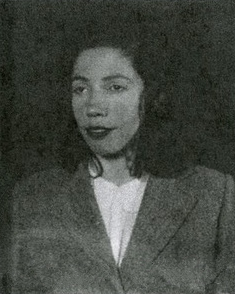
- Tereza de Arriaga in 1947
- Born: Maria Tereza d' Almeida Pinheiro d' Arriaga; February 5, 1915; Lisbon, Portugal
- Died: August 12, 2013 (aged 98); Oeiras, Portugal
- Occupation: Painter

Tereza de Arriaga (5 February 1915 – 12 August 2013) was a Portuguese painter and teacher.

== Early life and education ==
Maria Tereza d' Almeida Pinheiro d' Arriaga was born on 5 February 1915, in the Belém Palace. She was the granddaughter of Manuel de Arriaga, and her father, Roque Manuel de Arriaga, was his personal assistant. She and her family were all living in the palace until the May 14 Revolt of 1915, which ended the presidential mandate, and Arriaga had to leave the Palace. When she was three, her mother died of the Spanish flu at age 27.

Her childhood was spent in Monte Estoril, where she was educated by her father and by an English tutoress. She was also a student at the religious boarding school Colégio da Pena in Sintra. The family returned to Lisbon, where Tereza finished her primary education at the private Colégio Inglês, or English College.

Despite her father being a Republican, her education tended towards the bourgeois ideal of the time: knowing how to play the piano and speak French. She tried to continue her piano studies, but by the end of her adolescence, she decided to prepare herself for the School of Arts. However, when she attended the studio of Raquel Roque Gameiro, Gameiro advised her to leave. She attended night school at the Sociedade Nacional de Belas-Artes (SNBA), where she was the only woman. She was taught by Frederico Aires, who lent her plaster busts from his own studio for her to practice drawing. A year later, she enrolled in a painting course at the School of Arts. There, she met Jorge de Oliveira, whom she later married. By the end of her third year, she withdrew to start working on her artistry.

== Career ==
Arriaga began her career in plastic arts during the 1940s. She was inspired by Neorealism, and gradually moved towards creating abstract works with geometric characters. Her works are signed “Tereza Arriaga” or “Marriage.” Arriaga lived in Pinhal de Leiria from 1944 to 1945, during which she taught drawing at the Industrial School of Marinha Grande. She also interacted with local workers during her time there and went on to draw a series of drafts based on her interactions, called Meninos operários (Child workers). In this series, she depicts the gestures and tired faces of the children wrinkled by dehydration while working in the nearby glass factories.

From 1944 to 1985, she taught drawing at different schools, including the Escola de Artes Decorativas António Arroio.

Her only child was born in 1948; she kept painting for several years. Meanwhile, her husband, Jorge de Oliveira, was one of the pioneers of geometric abstraction in Portugal.

In the 1950s and 1960s, she drew mainly portraits. Between 1951 and 1952, Tereza focused on paintings with geometric shapes. In 1966 and 1967, she cooperated with the Sociedade Cooperativa de Gravadores Portugueses (Portuguese Engravers Cooperative Society), known as Cooperativa Gravura, to participate in the exhibitions at the course's end. With several drafts (such as a charcoal series on child workers with a neorealistic tendency), it was in 1967 that Tereza Arriaga would become a more consistent and professional painter.

The author herself divided her studies into three series, which correspond to three periods: Bioburgos, Helioburgos and Biohélios. All of them are based on the search for perfection and the expression of internal agitation. The dominant semiological element varies: the “bioburgos” are, according to the author, ourselves, but biologic, which means they are inserted in a wider system as all the animals have towns. On the other hand, the element “helium” refers to the confrontation between the being and the light. The semiology is inserted for cosmic connections between beings that are indefinite to conscience and thus can only be expressed by an ambiguity threshold, i.e., between dream and emotion. She calls this type of relationship “comradeship”.

Her work is mainly displayed in the collection of the Museu do Chiado, as well as in institutional, private, national and foreign collections.

== Later life ==
In Marinha Grande, after World War II, as well as the development of political activities against the Salazar regime, she developed cultural and political initiatives between the 1940s and the 1950s. These initiatives included working-class clubs and associations, and conferences on women's rights, music or history, where she would take intellectuals and artists from Lisbon, such as Fernando Lopes Graça, Maria Isabel Aboim Inglês or the historian Flausino Torres to industrial towns around the country.

During that same time, she became involved in antifascist movements and events, which culminated in her arrest by the PIDE and 110 days of imprisonment in the political prison of Caxias. This imprisonment has brought her several professional problems.

Arriaga died on August 12, 2013, in Alto do Lagoal, Oeiras, at the age of 98.

== Bibliography ==
- Carmo, Fernando Infante (editor and preface): Aspectos das Artes Plásticas em Portugal, 1992 (it does not refer to the painter; reproduction of a painting and painter ‘s photo)
- Dacosta, António: Dacosta em Paris – textos, Ed. Assírio e Alvim, s/d, p. 97.
- De Carvalho, Orlando M. P. N.: “Entrevistas a Tereza Arriaga e Jorge de Oliveira, 2005-2007”, documentation Centre of the Museu do Neo-Realismo, Vila Franca de Xira, 2007.
- Exposição Geral de Artes Plásticas, Catalogue, SNBA, July 1946.
- Gonçalves, Rui Mário: Colóquio Artes, nº 19, October 1994, pp. 31–37.
- Santos, Luiza: Tereza Arriaga – Pintura, in Exhibition catalogue 22/06 – 21/07, Câmara Municipal de Vila Franca de Xira, 2007.
- Tavares, Salette: Tereza Arriaga, in Exhibition catalogue in Galeria Diprove, Lisbon, April–May 1974.
- Tereza Arriaga, Helioburgos, Exhibition catalogue in Galeria Espiral, Oeiras.
