= Marco Antônio Freire Gomes =

General of the Brazilian Army

General Marco Antônio Freire Gomes GCMM
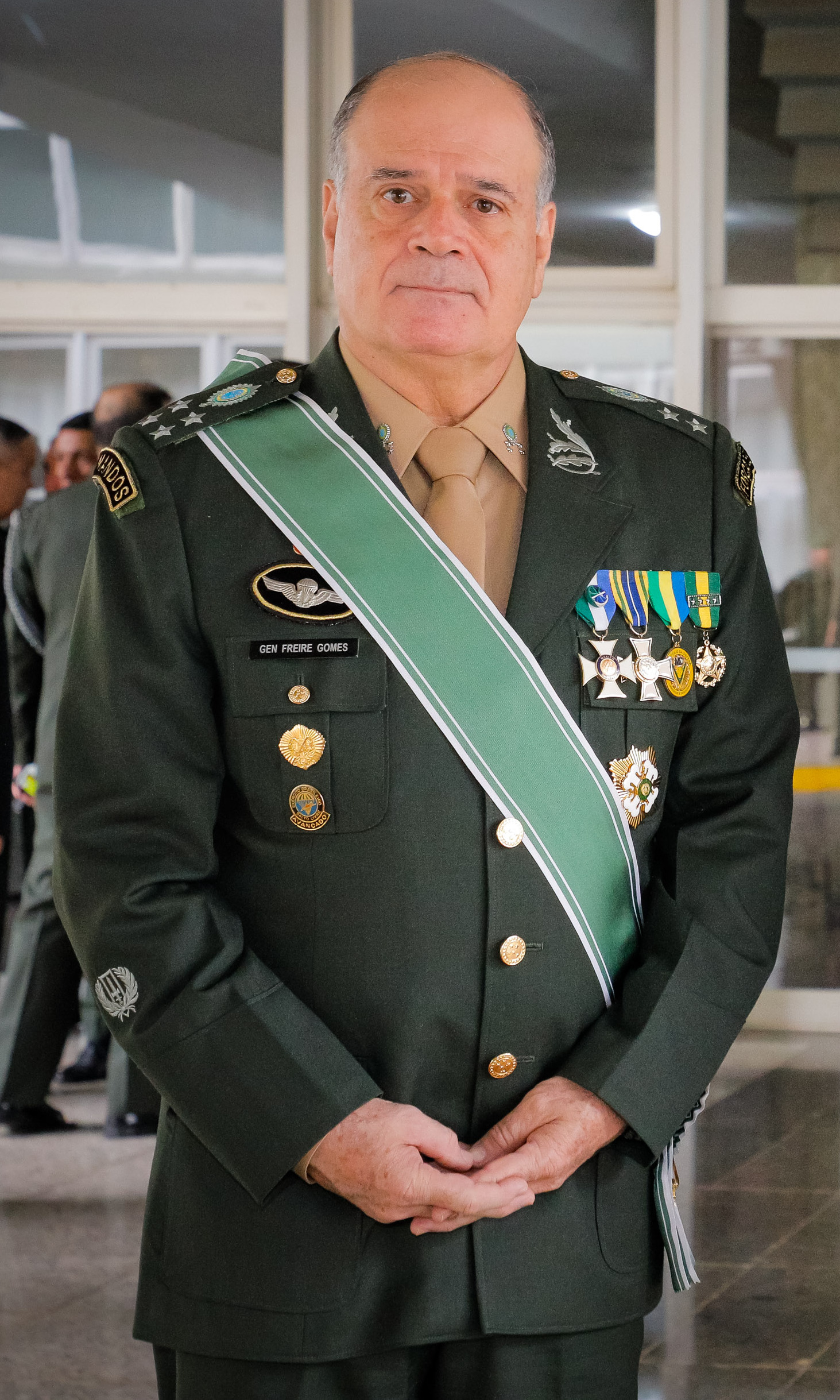

Commander of the Brazilian Army
- In office 31 March 2022 – 30 December 2022
- President: Jair Bolsonaro
- Minister: Paulo Sérgio Nogueira
- Preceded by: Paulo Sérgio Nogueira
- Succeeded by: Júlio Cesar de Arruda

Land Operations Commander
- In office 9 September 2021 – 30 March 2022
- Preceded by: José Luiz Dias Freitas
- Succeeded by: Estevam Cals Theophilo Gaspar de Oliveira

Northeastern Military Commander
- In office 21 August 2018 – 3 September 2021
- Preceded by: Artur Costa Moura
- Succeeded by: Richard Fernandez Nunes

Personal details
- Born: 31 July 1957 (age 69) Pirassununga, São Paulo, Brazil
- Education: Agulhas Negras Military Academy
- Awards: Order of Military Merit (Grand Cross - Grã-Cruz)

Military service
- Allegiance: Brazil
- Branch/service: Brazilian Army
- Years of service: 1977–2022
- Rank: Army general
- Commands: 1st Command Action Battalion; Special Operations Command; 10th Military Region; Northeastern Military Command; Land Operations Command

Marco Antônio Freire Gomes (born 31 July 1957 in Pirassununga) is a retired army general of the Brazilian Army, which he commanded from 31 March to 30 December 2022.

== Military career ==
=== Military official ===
Gomes is son of Cavalry Colonel Francisco Valdir Gomes and Maria Enilda Freire Gomes.

From Military School of Rio de Janeiro and Fortaleza, he joined the military on 14 February 1977 at the Agulhas Negras Military Academy. He was declared officer candidate of the cavalry on 15 December 1980.

During his career, he served at Cavalry units, such as the 10th Mechanized Cavalry Squad in Bela Vista, Mato Grosso do Sul and the 16th Mechanized Cavalry Regiment in Bayeux. Gomes also served at the 1st Special Forces Battalion and the Command of the Paratroopers Brigade, both in Rio de Janeiro.

He was member of the United Nations Observers Group in Central America and was instructor of the Special Instruction Section of the Agulhas Negras Military Academy. General Gomes also was the first commander of the 1st Command Action Battalion in Goiânia.

As superior official, Gomes served as Chief of the Operations Division and Intelligence Division of the Institutional Security Bureau in Brasília, Chief of the Regional Military Service of the 11th Military Region; Military Aide of Defence and Army to the Brazilian Embassy in Spain, Chief of the Doctrine Section and Assistant to the 3rd Subchief of the Army Staff and Official of the Joint Staff of the Brazilian Armed Forces.

=== Official general ===
As Official General, he served as Commander of the Special Operations Command in Goiânia, 1st Subchief of the Land Operations Command in Brasília, Commander of the 10th Military Region in Fortaleza and Executive Secretary of the Institutional Security Bureau in Brasília.

Gomes was promoted to Army General on 31 July 2018, and served as Commander of the Northeastern Military Command in Recife from 21 August 2018 to 3 September 2021.

After that, Gomes served as Command of Land Operations in Brasília, from 9 September 2021 to 30 March 2022.

=== Resistance to 2022 Brazilian Coup Plot ===
In 2024, investigations by the Supreme Federal Court revealed that general Freire Gomes was one of the army officials positioned against the 2022 Brazilian coup plot. Witness testimony provided by Brazilian Air Force commander Carlos de Almeida Baptista Júnior says that, in the reunion where the coup meetings with then president Jair Bolsonaro took place, Freire Gomes threatened to arrest the president if he tried to proceed with the coup attempt.

This event earned Gomes the enmity of the coup supporters. In cellphone messages recovered by the Federal Police of Brazil between Walter Braga Netto and former captain Ailton Barros, if Gomes continued to resist the coup he should be "thrown to the lions" and "his head should be offered".

In March 2024, he provided over eight hours of witness testimony to the Federal Police as part of Operation Tempus Veritatis.

Military offices
| Preceded by Artur Costa Moura | Northeastern Military Commander; 2018–2021 | Succeeded by Richard Fernandez Nunes |
| Preceded by José Luiz Dias Freitas | Land Operations Commander; 2021–2022 | Succeeded by Estevam Cals Theophilo Gaspar de Oliveira |
| Preceded by Paulo Sérgio Nogueira de Oliveira | Commander of the Brazilian Army; 2022 | Succeeded by Júlio Cesar de Arruda |
