= Police operations in the 2022 Brazilian general election =

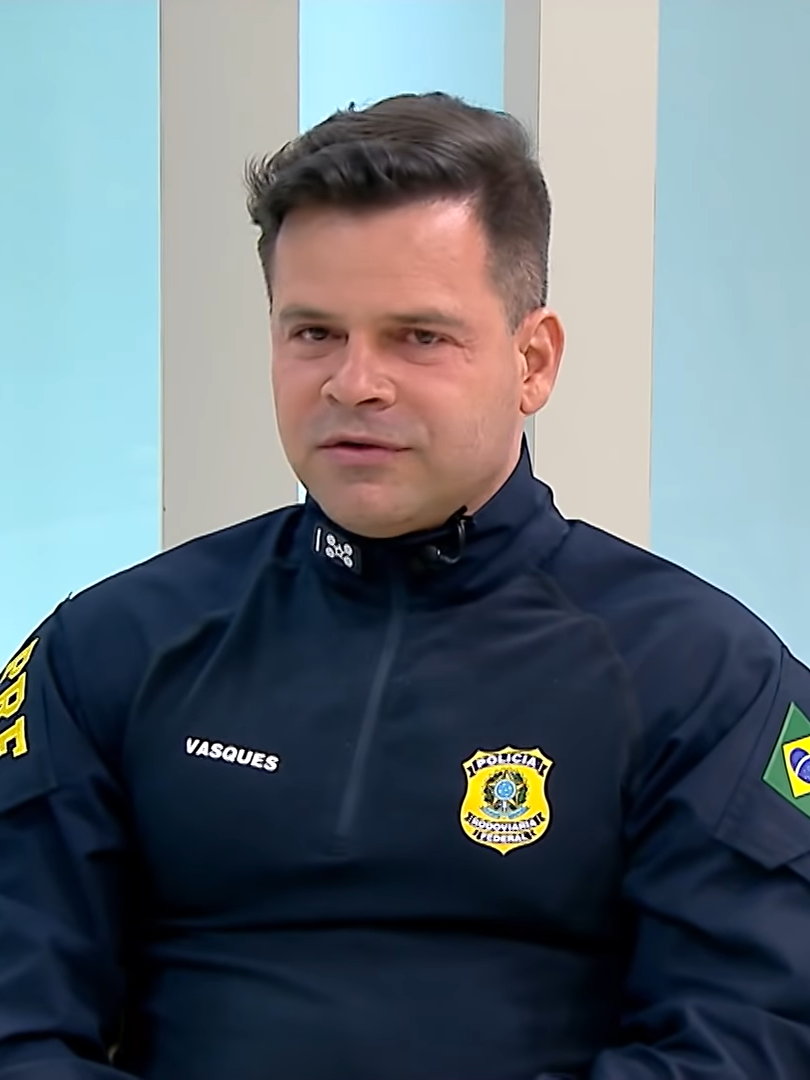
Former director of the Federal Highway Police, Silvinei Vasques, during the program Brasil em Pauta. He was a major figure for investigations related to general elections.

Police operations in the 2022 Brazilian general election were coordinated actions carried out by the Federal Police of Brazil and the Federal Highway Police, mainly during the second round of the 2022 Brazilian general election. They targeted public transportation vehicles, mainly in the Northeast Region, Brazil, allegedly with the aim of ensuring transportation safety according to their supporters, or delaying the arrival of these vehicles at polling places according to critics.

== Context ==
On 29 October, the eve of the second round of the presidential election, news of possible operations by the Federal Police and the Federal Highway Police were already causing several reports and denunciations by politicians. The allegations were that the police, whose agents were mostly Bolsonarists, intended to carry out inspection operations in public transportation, especially in the northeast of the country, a region where most voters support Luiz Inácio Lula da Silva, with the aim of delaying transportation and thus preventing people from reaching the polling locations in time to vote. The president of the Superior Electoral Court, Alexandre de Moraes, issued an order for the police to clarify the accusations. As a consequence, the minister issued an order prohibiting the entities from carrying out any operation that would cause impediments to the circulation of public transportation on Sunday and stated that the directors of the police forces would be held responsible for non-compliance.

The order came in the wake of a Supreme Federal Court decision that ruled on 19 October for the legality of providing free public transportation on election day. As a consequence of the decision, all Brazilian capitals and several states, voluntarily, or by force of judicial decisions, offered free transportation on the date in question. President Jair Bolsonaro's campaign challenged the decisions, allegedly on the grounds that the measure tends to decrease abstention among the poorest people, the universe of voters where his opponent gets the largest share of votes.

== Operations ==
=== Planning ===
A Folha de São Paulo report stated that the Federal Highway Police operation began to be articulated on the night of 19 October during a meeting of Bolsonaro's campaign core, held at the Palácio da Alvorada. The operation was articulated with members of the Brazilian Armed Forces, the Federal Police, and the Federal Highway Police.

=== Execution ===
In the second round of the 2022 Brazilian presidential election, a series of Federal Police and Federal Highway Police operations were reported to cause impediments to voting, occurring mainly in the northeast region and affecting the movement of public transportation. Internal corporate documents that circulated in the state of Paraná guided the agents to focus on approaching public transportation vehicles, both buses and vans.

The operation is considered by some to be an electoral crime. Moraes requested explanations from the director-general of the Federal Highway Police about the operations carried out, attaching to the determination videos showing the restrictions caused to voting in the interior of Paraíba, recorded by the mayor of the municipality himself, who denounced the action for disproportionately affecting voters in rural areas. The reports by voters and representatives proliferate mainly in the northeast but similar occurrences have been reported in Rio de Janeiro.

The director general of the Federal Highway Police, Silvinei Vasques, had made posts on social networks in favour of Bolsonaro. Silvinei Vasques sent a letter to the Federal Highway Police superintendencies stating that the Superior Electoral Court's determination "did not impose any limit on the exercise of the Federal Highway Police's regular inspection activity" and ordered the continuation of the planned operation. Videos and messages from other agents mocking the Superior Electoral Court's determination and celebrating the electoral suppression of supporters of Lula were denounced on social networks.

In all, there were 272 operations carried out in the northeast, 49.5% of all actions for the day. While in the Southeastern region, the most populated and with the largest highway network, only 51 actions took place, 9.4% of the total. The number of approaches registered in the second round was 70% higher than in the first.

== Aftermath ==
On November 9, Silvinei Vasques and Justice Minister Anderson Torres were summoned to the Chamber of Deputies to provide clarification at the request of federal deputy Ivan Valente (PSOL-SP), and the next day Silvinei started being investigated by the Federal Police (PF) at the request of the Federal Public Ministry for his actions in the elections.

Silvinei was arrested on 10 August 2023.
