= Operation Tempus Veritatis =

2024 Brazilian police operation

Operation Tempus Veritatis (Latin for "time of truth") was a Federal Police operation in Brazil in February 2024 that led to the preventive arrest of military officers and aides of former president Jair Bolsonaro. The operation also executed search and seizure warrants against several targets, including four former ministers. Launched on February 8, the operation followed a plea bargain signed by Mauro Cid with a Federal Police researcher. The operation was based on a video seized from a computer belonging to Mauro Cid, documenting a meeting held on July 5, 2022, between former president Jair Bolsonaro and his ministers.

The name of the operation references the alleged attempt to undermine the Democratic Rule of Law to gain political advantage by keeping Bolsonaro, then President of the Republic, in power.

== Draft coup ==
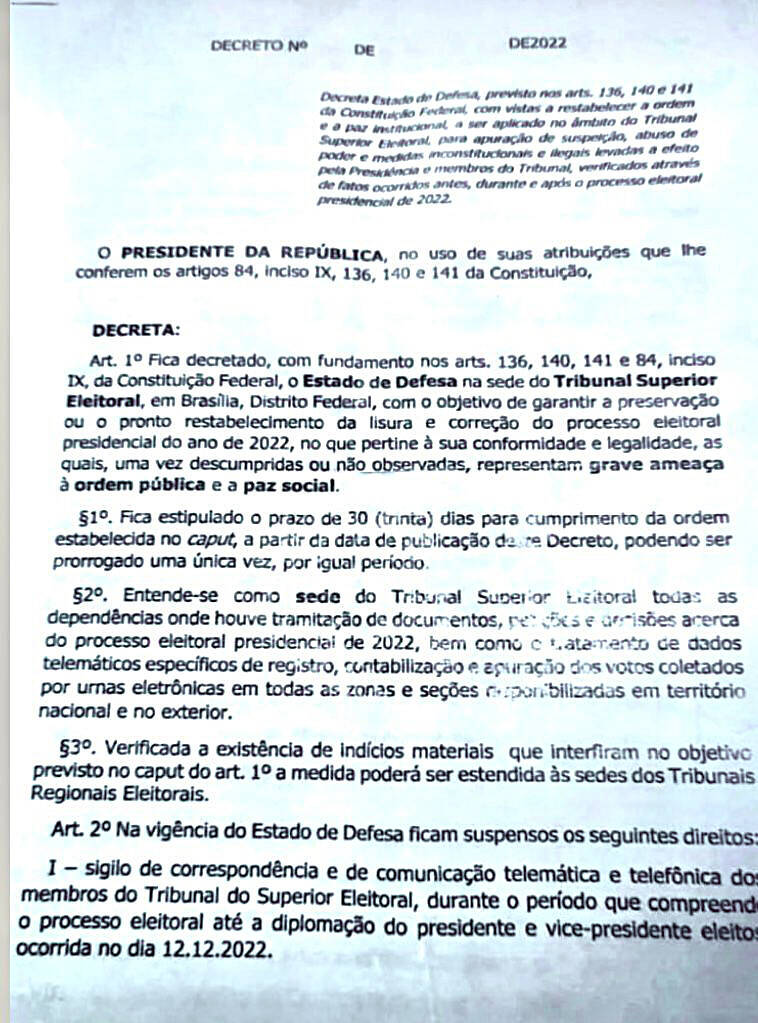
The drafted of plan outlining a series of measures against the judiciary to undermine the Democratic Rule of Law

Investigations revealed that the group had drafted a plan outlining a series of measures against the judiciary. This group also held meetings to promote the dissemination of fake news against the Brazilian electoral system and monitored Supreme Court Justice Alexandre de Moraes, who authorized the operation. The draft also called for the arrests of two Supreme Court justices and the president of the Senate.

== Context and background ==
The operation is part of a broader investigation into an alleged coup plot involving former president Jair Bolsonaro and his close advisors. The plot aimed to subvert the transition of power to newly elected president Luiz Inácio Lula da Silva by arresting Supreme Court justices and shutting down government institutions. The investigation has revealed evidence of fake news dissemination and attempts to discredit the electoral system.

== Key figures and arrests ==
Those being investigated for the possible coup attempt are: On February 8, 2024, the Federal Police carried out thirty-three search and seizure warrants and four preventive detention warrants. Among those arrested were former special advisor to Bolsonaro, Filipe G. Martins, retired colonel Marcelo Câmara, and major Rafael Martins. The targets of the search and seizure measures included the president of the Liberal Party, Valdemar Costa Neto, generals Braga Netto, Augusto Heleno, and Paulo Sérgio Nogueira, admiral Almir Garnier Santos, former minister Anderson Torres, and Bolsonaro himself, who had his passport seized.

== Public reactions ==
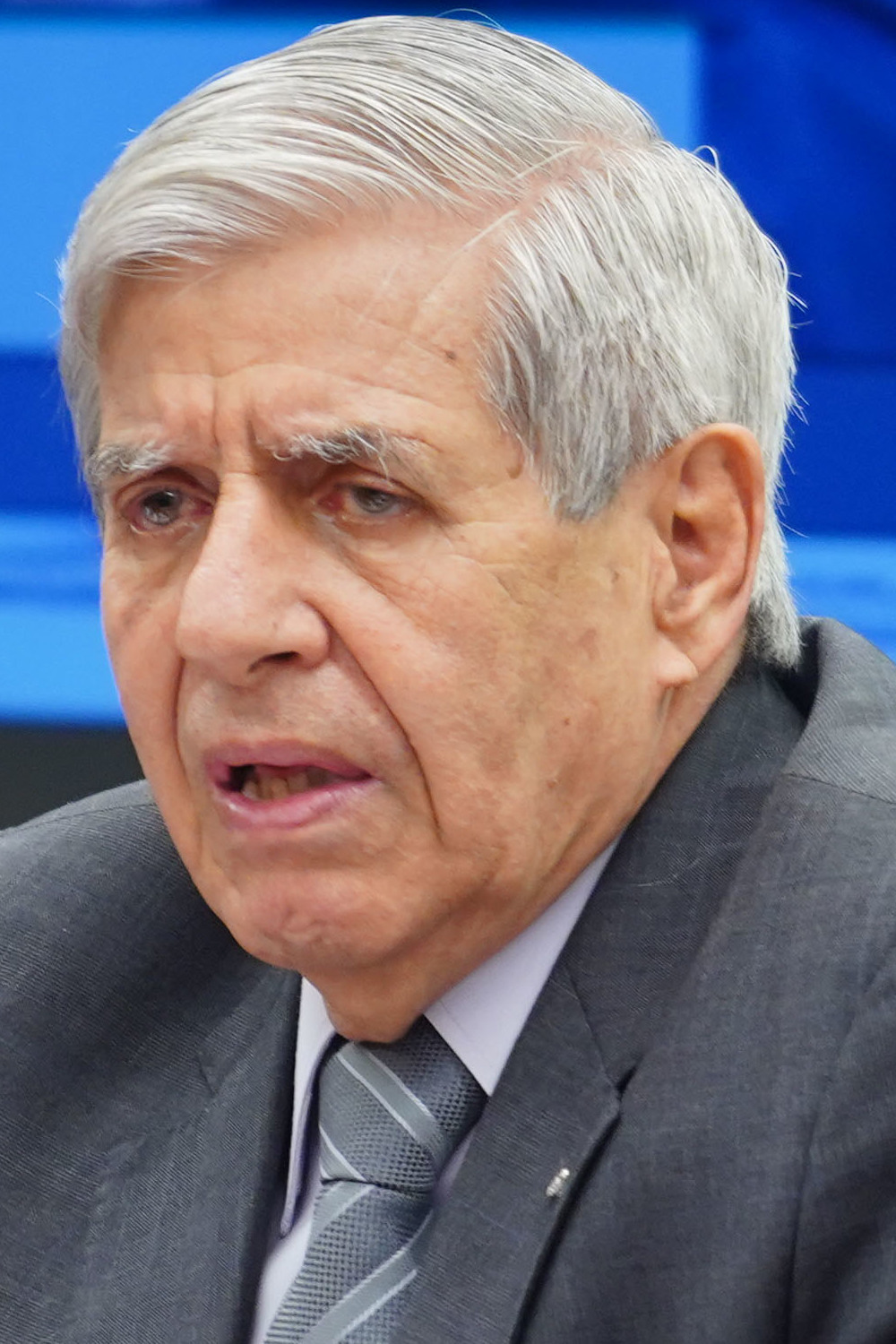
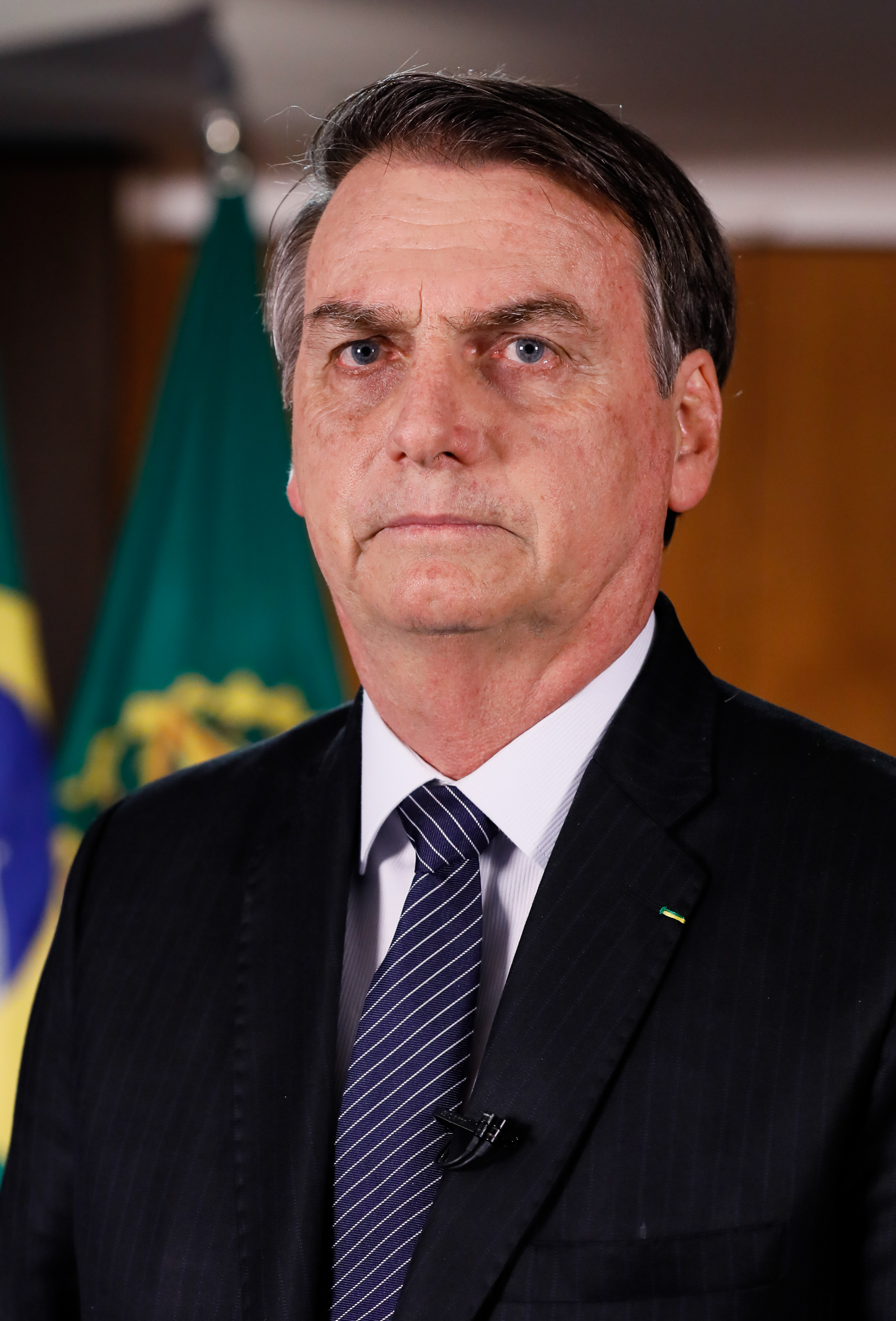
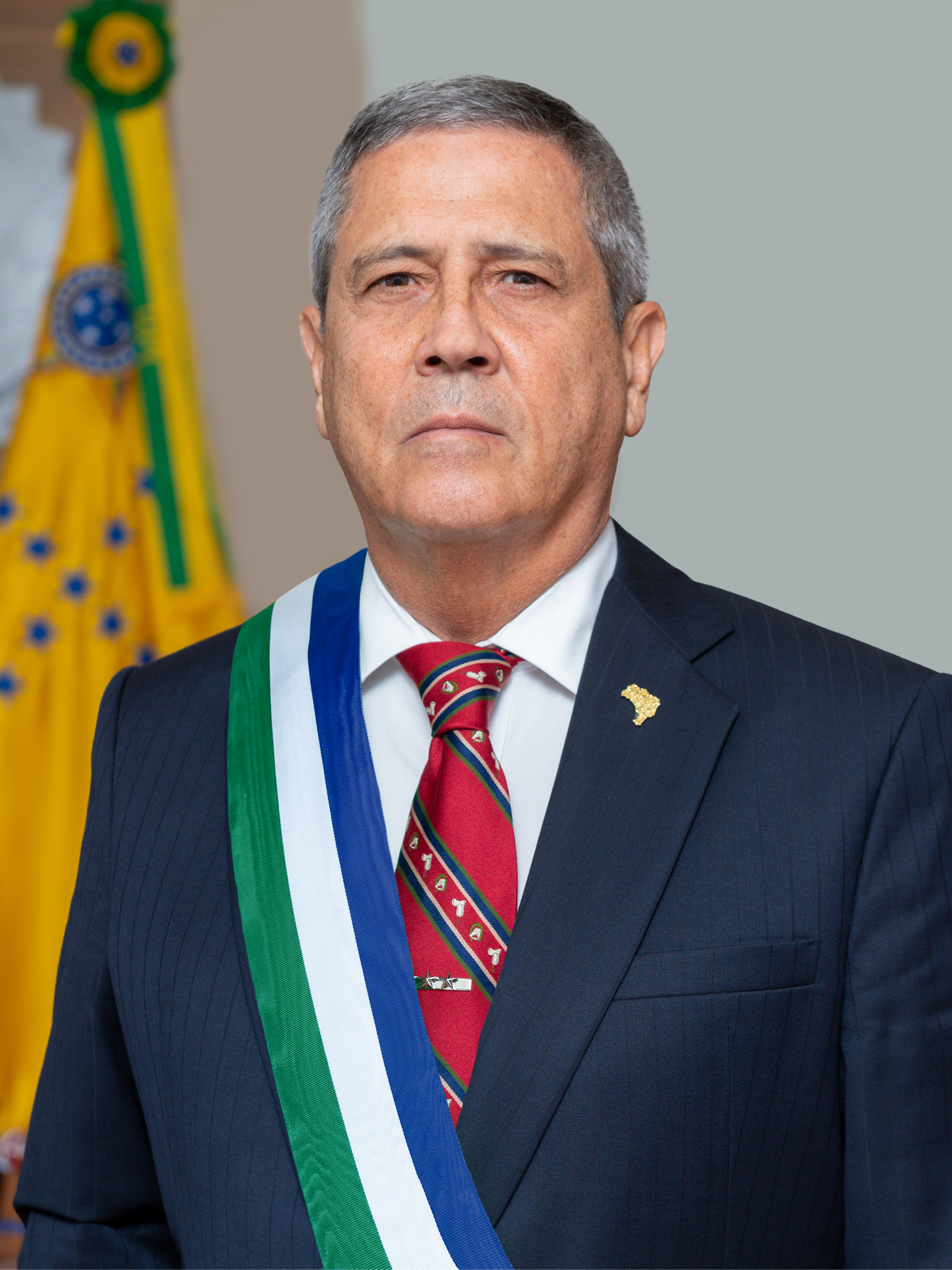
Augusto Heleno (left), Jair Bolsonaro (center) and Walter Braga Netto (right) are among the main figures involved in the possible Coup d'état attempt.

On February 9, 2024, a video from a meeting held on July 5, 2022, was made public. In this video, then-President Jair Bolsonaro was recorded instructing ministers on the need to act before the elections to avoid a possible "guerrilla" in Brazil. The video, found on Mauro Cid's computer, was released by journalist Bela Megale of the newspaper O Globo. Bolsonaro allegedly ordered the dissemination of fraudulent information to try to reverse the situation in the electoral dispute, alleging supposed electoral frauds that were never proven. The meeting also involved other ministers, including the then-Minister of Defense, who reportedly stated that the Superior Electoral Court (TSE) was an "enemy" of the Bolsonarist group. The recording is part of an investigation into an attempted coup involving military personnel and former ministers. During the meeting, the then minister of the Institutional Security Bureau (GSI), General Augusto Heleno, expressed the intention to infiltrate agents from the Brazilian Intelligence Agency (Abin) into both Jair Bolsonaro's and his main opponent Luiz Inácio Lula da Silva's electoral campaigns. Heleno mentioned the importance of acting before the elections to avoid possible upheavals, using terms such as "turning the table" and highlighting the need for decisive action before the ballot. President Bolsonaro interrupted Heleno, expressing concern about leaks and suggesting that such matters be discussed in a private meeting.

== Legal proceedings and reactions ==
The Federal Police carried out thirty-three search and seizure warrants and four preventive detention warrants. Supreme Court Justice Alexandre de Moraes authorized the operation and issued precautionary measures, including a ban on maintaining contact with other individuals under investigation and a suspension from exercising public duties. President Lula expressed hope that the full force of the law would be applied against those who attacked democracy.
