= Júlio Cesar de Arruda =

Brazilian general

General Júlio Cesar de Arruda
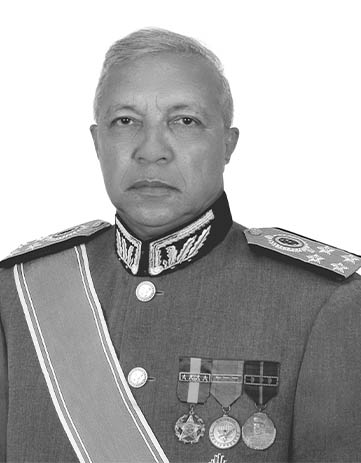

Commander of the Brazilian Army
- In office 30 December 2022 – 21 January 2023
- President: Jair Bolsonaro; Luiz Inácio Lula da Silva
- Minister: Paulo Sérgio Nogueira; José Múcio
- Preceded by: Marco Antônio Freire Gomes
- Succeeded by: Tomás Ribeiro Paiva

Personal details
- Born: 9 January 1959 (age 67) Cuiabá, Mato Grosso, Brazil

Military service
- Allegiance: Brazil
- Branch/service: Brazilian Army
- Years of service: 1975–2023
- Rank: Army general

Júlio Cesar de Arruda (born 9 January 1959) is a general in the Brazilian Army. He has served as chief of the army's Department of Engineering and Construction. He was the commander of the Brazilian Army from 30 December 2022 to 21 January 2023.

== Biography ==
Arruda was born on 9 January 1959 in Cuiabá. He joined the army in 1975. Two years later, he joined the Academia Militar das Agulhas Negras. In his military career, he served in engineering units in Itajubá, Rio de Janeiro, Cuiabá, and Brasília. As lieutenant colonel, he advised the Institutional Security Bureau of the Presidency of the Republic (2000–01) and commanded the 1st Battalion of Special Forces in Goiânia, in the (2005–06). With the rank of colonel, he was a commander at the Escola de Administração do Exército in Salvador and taught at the Centro de Preparação de Oficiais da Reserva in Itajubá, at the Escola de Aperfeiçoamento de Oficiais, and at the Escola de Comando e Estado-Maior do Exército.

He was also a military observer for the United Nations Angola Verification Mission II and an advisor for the Brazilian Military Cooperation in Paraguay. He also completed a course on counterterrorism at the National Defense University in the United States.

He was also a commander at the Academia Militar das Agulhas Negras in Rio and at the Special Operations Command in Goiânia, and he held a variety of other positions.

=== Command of the Brazilian army ===
Arruda was put in charge of the Brazilian army under Jair Bolsonaro on 30 December 2022, replacing Marco Antônio Freire Gomes. Júlio Cesar de Arruda was appointed in coordination with the transition team of Luiz Inácio Lula da Silva, so that the change of command would take place before Lula's inauguration. He was confirmed to his position by Lula's minister of defense José Múcio Monteiro on 6 January 2023.

=== 2023 Brasília attack ===
On 8 January, pro-Bolsonaro rioters attacked federal buildings at the Praça dos Três Poderes in Brasília, many calling on the military to overturn the election results in which Jair Bolsonaro lost to Luiz Inácio Lula da Silva. In the aftermath of the attack, Lula administration officials arrived at the headquarters of the Brazilian Army to detain insurrectionists at a pro-Bolsonaro camp on the lawn adjacent to the army headquarters. The officials were faced tanks and lines of soldiers, and Júlio Cesar de Arruda told Minister of Justice Flávio Dino: "You are not going to arrest people here." Lula administration officials say this gave hundreds of insurrectionists an opportunity to escape and evade arrest.

President Lula blamed the intelligence services of the armed forces and the Brazilian Intelligence Agency for failing to alert him to the possibility of a coup attack. On 18 January, Lula affirmed that "Todos que participaram do ato golpista serão punidos. Todos. Não importa a patente, não importa a força que ele participe. [Everyone who participated in coup activity will be punished. Everyone. No matter what rank, no matter what branch of the military they're in.]"

Lula relieved Arruda of his post as commander of the army on 21 January 2023, replacing him with Tomás Miguel Ribeiro Paiva.

Military offices
Preceded by Marco Antônio Freire Gomes	Commander of the Brazilian Army; 2022–2023	Succeeded by Tomás Ribeiro Paiva
