= Walter Braga Netto =

Minister of Defence of Brazil from 2021 to 2022

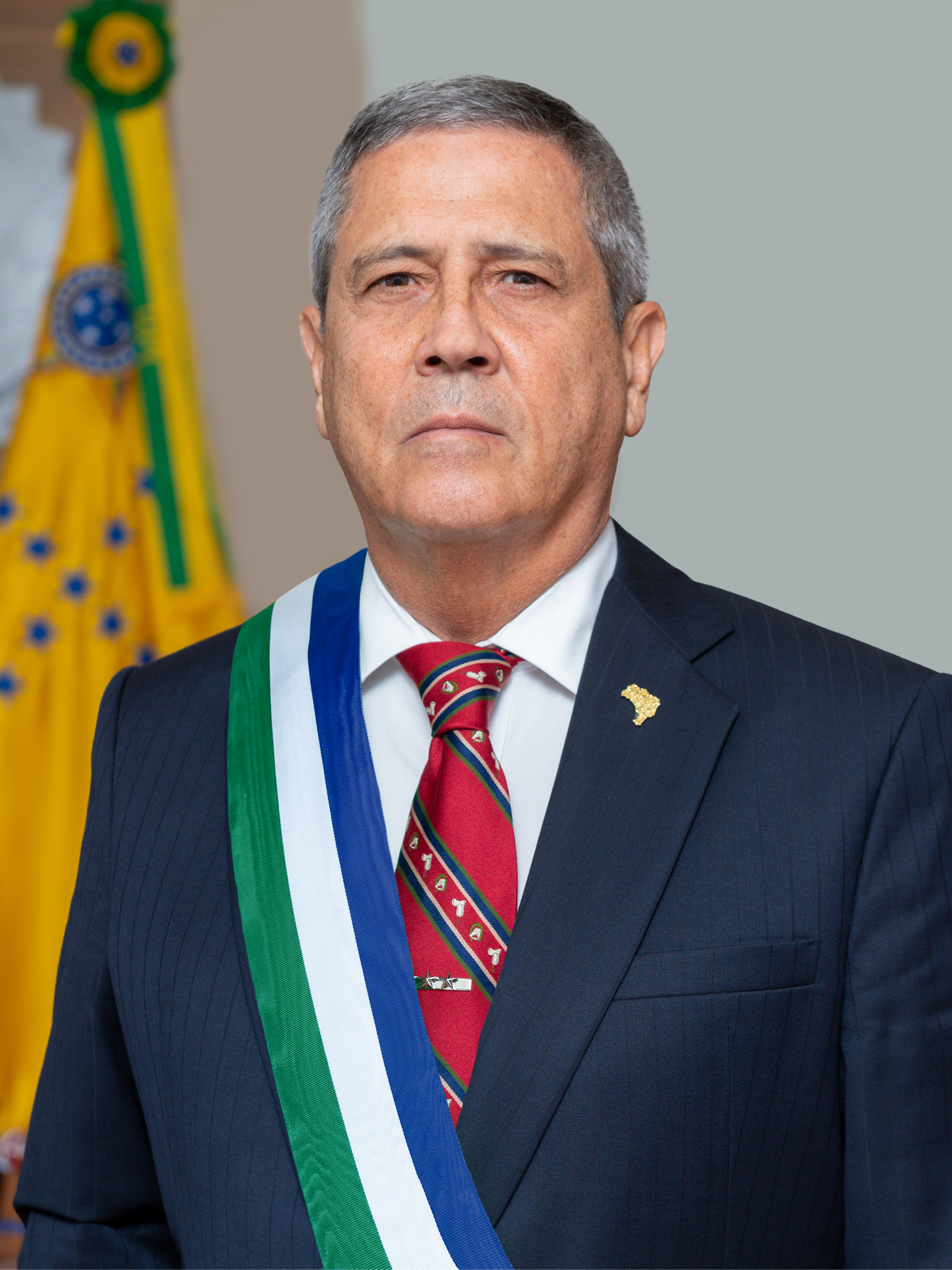
- Official portrait, 2021

Minister of Defence
- In office 30 March 2021 – 1 April 2022
- President: Jair Bolsonaro
- Preceded by: Fernando Azevedo e Silva
- Succeeded by: Paulo Sérgio Nogueira de Oliveira

Chief of Staff of the Presidency
- In office 18 February 2020 – 29 March 2021
- President: Jair Bolsonaro
- Preceded by: Onyx Lorenzoni
- Succeeded by: Luiz Eduardo Ramos

Chief of the Brazilian Army General Staff
- In office 29 March 2019 – 18 February 2020
- President: Jair Bolsonaro
- Preceded by: Paulo Humberto Cesar de Oliveira
- Succeeded by: Marcos Antonio Amaro dos Santos

Eastern Military Commander
- In office 23 September 2016 – 26 April 2019
- Preceded by: Fernando Azevedo e Silva
- Succeeded by: Júlio Cesar de Arruda

Federal intervenor in Rio de Janeiro
- In office 18 February 2018 – 31 December 2018
- President: Michel Temer
- Governor: Luiz Fernando Pezão; Francisco Dornelles (interim)

Personal details
- Born: 11 March 1957 (age 69) Belo Horizonte, Minas Gerais, Brazil
- Party: PL (since 2022)
- Education: Agulhas Negras Military Academy

Military service
- Allegiance: Brazil
- Branch/service: Brazilian Army
- Years of service: 1975–2020
- Rank: General
- Commands: Staff of the Brazilian Army; Eastern Military Command; 1st Military Region; 1st Regiment of Combat Cars
- Criminal information
- Status: In prison
- Convictions: Attempted violent abolition of the democratic rule of law; Attempted coup d'état; Participation in an armed criminal organization; Qualified damage; Deterioration of protected heritage property
- Trial: Trial for the 2022–2023 Brazilian coup plot (8 – 11 September 2025)
- Penalty: 26 years in prison

Details
- Date apprehended: 14 December 2024
- Imprisoned at: 1st Army Division; Rio de Janeiro, Brazil

Walter Souza Braga Netto (Note: Portuguese pronunciation: [ˈvaw.teʁ ˈso(w).zɐ ˈbɾa.ɡɐ ˈnɛ.tu]) (born 11 March 1957) is a retired Brazilian army general and former Minister of Defence. Braga was Commander of the Eastern Military Command and, until 31 December 2018, Federal Interventor in the Public Security of the state of Rio de Janeiro. He unsuccessfully ran for Vice President of Brazil as running mate of Jair Bolsonaro in 2022, narrowly losing to Luiz Inácio Lula da Silva and Geraldo Alckmin.

On 19 November 2024, a Federal Police investigation came to light implicating Braga Netto and other former members of the Bolsonaro administration in a suspected coup plot. The plan allegedly included the assassination of Luiz Inácio Lula da Silva, Geraldo Alckmin, and Alexandre de Moraes, who were, at the time, the president-elect, vice president-elect, and president of the Superior Electoral Court, respectively. On 21 November 2024, Braga Netto was formally indicted by the Federal Police. On 14 December 2024, he was arrested by Federal Police for allegedly hindering investigations.

== Early life ==
Braga Netto was born on 11 March 1957 in Belo Horizonte.

== Military career ==
Enlisted on 17 February 1975, Braga Netto enrolled in the Academia Militar das Agulhas Negras (AMAN) where, on 14 December 1978, he was declared an Officer Aspirant. Braga was promoted to second lieutenant on 31 August 1979, to first lieutenant on 25 December 1980, and to captain on 25 December 1984.

=== Senior officer ===
As lieutenant colonel, Braga Netto served as assistant of Sub-Secretariat of Programs and Project of the Secretariat of Strategic Affairs of the Presidency of the Republic. On 2 February 2001, he was nominated Cabinet Officer of then-Army Commander, Gleuber Vieira.

On 9 July 2001, Braga Netto was nominated commander of the 1st Regiment of Combat Cars (1° RCC), still headquartered in Rio de Janeiro. He was promoted to colonel on 17 December 2001.

He was nominated Defence and Army Attaché to the Brazilian Embassy in Poland, a position he held from 1 February 2005 to 1 February 2007.

=== General officer ===
Promoted to brigadier general in November 2009, he was nominated Staff-Chief of the Western Military Command on 23 November.

In 2011, he was designated military attaché of the Army to the Brazilian Embassy in the United States, also accredited to Canada.

On 31 March 2013, he was promoted to Divisional general. On 21 August, he was nominated General Coordinated of the Special Advisory of the Olympic and Paralympic Games Rio 2016. On 25 November 2015, Walter Braga became commander of the 1st Military Region, leaving the Coordination.

On 31 July 2016, he was promoted to Army general and nominated Commander of the Eastern Military Command.

On 16 February 2018, General Braga Netto was nominated Federal Interventor in the Public Security of Rio de Janeiro by President Michel Temer, position he held until the end of the year. Over the course of 10 months, Braga Netto took command of the state of Rio de Janeiro’s police forces with Army troops deployed for internal use against the civilian population. In relation to the previous year, the period of intervention registered an increase of almost 40 percent in killings committed by police officers.

On 29 March 2019, he took office as Staff-Chief of the Army.

== Bolsonaro Government ==
On 12 February 2020, he was invited by President Jair Bolsonaro for the position of Chief of Staff of the Presidency. On March 31, 2021, after the joint resignation of the commanders of the three branches of the Brazilian armed forces, Minister of Defense, and other leaders in the Brazilian military, Braga Netto was appointed as the new Minister of Defense.

Braga Netto drew controversy shortly after his appointment after expressing support for the military dictatorship in Brazil.

=== COVID-19 pandemic ===
On May 26, 2020, a report from Reuters revealed that as the Health Ministry of Brazil began taking preventative measures against the COVID-19 pandemic on March 13, Bolsonaro intervened and scaled back their procedures within 24 hours. By March 16, Bolsonaro discreetly shifted power from the ministry to Braga Netto's Casa Civil, with the given reason being that "the pandemic 'transcended' public health".

In August 2020, Braga Netto was diagnosed with COVID-19.

== 2022 presidential election ==
On June 26, 2022, he was chosen to be incumbent president Jair Bolsonaro's running mate for the 2022 presidential election. It was announced by Bolsonaro during an interview given to journalists Rodrigo Constantino, Luís Ernesto Lacombe, Augusto Nunes and Ana Paula Henkel at the Programa 4 por 4 independent show.

== Post-election and post-government ==
After Bolsonaro lost the election to Lula, his supporters demonstrated nationwide. Many asked for a military coup, setting up encampments outside military headquarters across the country. In a question-and-answer session with some supporters in November 2022 in Brasilia, Braga Netto said, "Don't you lose your faith, okay? This is only what I can tell you for now."

On 8 January 2023, Bolsonaro supporters stormed and vandalized government buildings in Brasilia, including the Palácio do Planalto, the Supreme Federal Court Palace, and the National Congress Palace, in an attempt to overthrow the newly inaugurated Lula. On 11 January, the Superior Electoral Court found that Bolsonaro and Braga Netto had violated electoral law over speeches made during 2022's Independence Day celebrations, and declared them unfit to run for any office until 2030. On 18 January, CNN Brasil reported that Braga Netto led conversations after the election about imposing a national state of emergency, also drafting a decree with other government officials.

In October 2023, a congressional committee recommended charging Bolsonaro, Braga Netto and other government officials with insurrection for their roles in the 8 January attack. In March 2024, the Federal Police of Brazil launched a probe of Braga Netto over the planned assassination by a special forces unit of Lula and Vice President Geraldo Alckmin, before they could assume office, and Supreme Court justice Alexandre de Moraes, causing enough unrest for Bolsonaro to stay in power.

In November 2024, Bolsonaro and several of his former ministers and aides, including Braga Netto, were indicted for their efforts to void the election. At the time of his arrest the next month, it was reported that Braga Netto was retired from his role as an army general.

=== 2024 arrest ===
On 14 December 2024, Braga Netto was arrested and held in Rio de Janeiro for allegedly obstructing the Federal Police's probe of the 2022 coup plot. Simultaneously, his house and that of his military aide Flavio Botelho Peregrino were searched by the police.

== Notes ==
Military offices
Preceded by Paulo Humberto Cesar de Oliveira	Chief of the Brazilian Army General Staff; 2019–2020	Succeeded by Marcos Antonio Amaro dos Santos
Political offices
Preceded by Onyx Lorenzoni	Chief of Staff of the Presidency; 2020–2021	Succeeded by Luiz Eduardo Ramos
Preceded by Fernando Azevedo e Silva	Minister of Defence; 2021–2022	Succeeded by Paulo Sérgio Nogueira de Oliveira
