= Tomás Ribeiro Paiva =

Brazilian army general

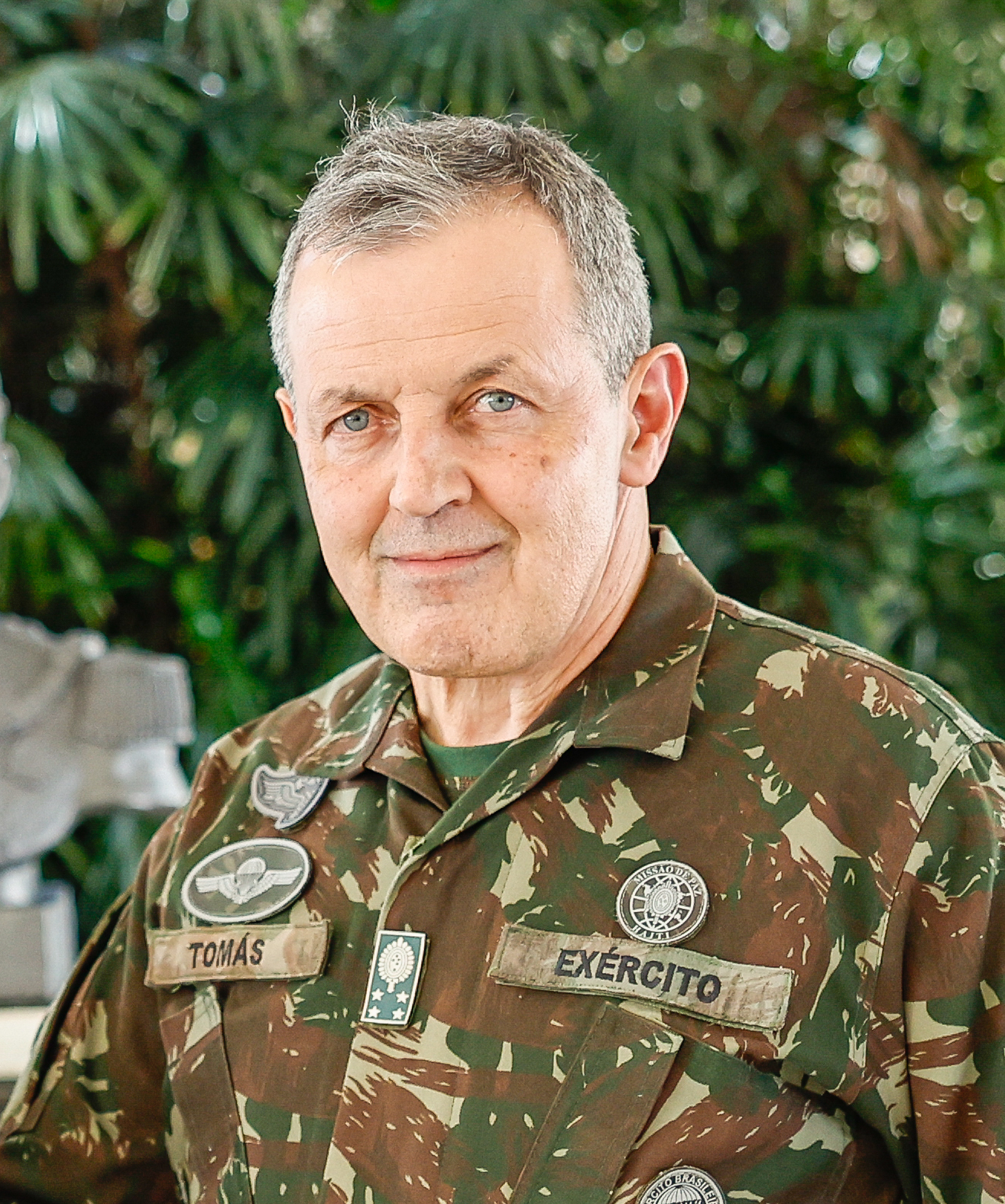

Commander of the Brazilian Army
- Incumbent
- Assumed office 25 January 2023
- President: Luiz Inácio Lula da Silva
- Minister: José Múcio
- Preceded by: Júlio Cesar de Arruda

Commander of the Southeastern Military Command
- In office 15 April 2021 – 25 January 2023
- Preceded by: Eduardo Antonio Fernandes
- Succeeded by: Guido Amin Naves

Personal details
- Born: 29 September 1960 (age 66) São Paulo, Brazil
- Spouse: Márcia Cristina Schoeller Borges

Military service
- Allegiance: Brazil
- Branch/service: Brazilian Army
- Years of service: 1975–present
- Rank: Army general
- Commands: Peacekeeping Infantry Battalion in Haiti; Presidential Guard Battalion; 11th Mechanized Infantry Brigade; Agulhas Negras Military Academy; 5th Army Division

Tomás Miguel Miné Ribeiro Paiva (born 29 September 1960) is a Brazilian army general, incumbent commander of the Brazilian Army.

== Biography ==
Born in São Paulo, Paiva began his military career in 1975, when he joined the Brazilian Army Preparatory School of Cadets in Campinas and was declared officer candidate in 1981.

He acted in a mission of the Army in Haiti as Undercommander of the Peacekeeping Infantry Battalion and was Commander of the Peacekeeping Forces of Operation Archangel VI in Penha and Alemão Complexes in Rio de Janeiro, in 2012.

Paiva also commanded the Presidential Guard Battalion in Brasília and was aide to the President during Fernando Henrique Cardoso presidency and Brazilian Military Aide to the Ecuadorian Army.

Tomás was also head of the Army Command Staff in Brasília, when general Eduardo Villas Bôas was the Commander and commanded the 5th Army Division in Curitiba.

General Tomás was also commander of the 11th Mechanized Infantry Brigade in Campinas, of the Agulhas Negras Military Academy in Resende, Rio de Janeiro and the Southeastern Military Command in São Paulo.

== Military awards ==
- - Order of Military Merit (Grand Cross)
- - Order of Defence Merit (Grand Cross)
- - Order of Naval Merit (Grand Cross)
- - Order of Aeronautical Merit (Grand Cross)
- - Order of Military Judiciary Merit (High Distinction)

Military offices
Preceded by Eduardo Antonio Fernandes	Commander of the Southeastern Military Command; 2021–2023	Succeeded by Guido Amin Naves
Preceded by Júlio Cesar de Arruda	Commander of the Brazilian Army; 2023–present	Incumbent
Order of precedence
Preceded by Marcos Sampaio Olsen as Commander of the Brazilian Navy	Brazilian order of precedence as Commander of the Brazilian Army	Followed by Marcelo Kanitz Damasceno as Commander of the Brazilian Air Force
