= Brazilian Army General Staff =

Brazilian space command

- Estado-Maior do Exército
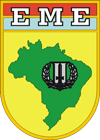
- Coat of arms of EME
- Active: 1896; 129 years ago
- Country: Brazil
- Type: General management body
- Part of: Brazilian Army
- Garrison/HQ: Brasília, DF
- Nickname(s): EME

Commanders
- Current: General Richard Fernandez Nunes

The Brazilian Army General Staff (Portuguese: Estado-Maior do Exército - EME) is the general management body responsible for the coordination of the Brazilian Army, the land force of the Brazilian Armed Forces.

== Mission ==
The EME's mission is to study, plan, guide, coordinate, and control at the general management level, the activities of the Army, in accordance with the decisions and guidelines defined by the Army High Command.

== History ==
The history of the organization begin in the United Kingdom of Portugal, Brazil and the Algarves, when the predecessor body called Court Arms Command was created in 1808 by the Count of Linhares and the Minister of War at the time. The organization was renamed as Court Headquarters in 1824 by the Emperor Pedro I of Brazil, after the declaration of independence September 1822. The current EME was founded on 24 October 1896, by the law No. 403, sanctioned by then President Prudente de Morais.

== Organization ==
The EME is subdivided in six subcommands:

- 1st subcommand - Army policies and strategic guidelines, concerning personnel, education and culture systems
- 2nd subcommand - Policies and strategic guidelines concerning the Army's information system
- 3rd subcommand - Accomplish with Army's strategic planning
- 4th subcommand - Formulate and propose policies and strategic guidelines for the Army's logistical activities
- 5th subcommand - Formulate and propose policies and strategic guidelines for the Army's activities in the international area and in environmental management
- 6th subcommand - Plan, guide and coordinate at the general management level, the Army's economic and finance activities

=== Other subdommands ===
- Administration assistance - Plan the administrative rationalization of the Army
- Army Project Office (EPEx) - Responsible for conducting the Army's strategic projects

== See also ==
- Future of the Brazilian Army
