= José Múcio =

Brazilian politician (born 1948)

- Official portrait, 2023

Minister of Defense
- Incumbent
- Assumed office 1 January 2023
- President: Luiz Inácio Lula da Silva
- Preceded by: Paulo Sério Nogueira

Minister of the Federal Court of Accounts
- In office 20 October 2009 – 1 January 2021
- Preceded by: Marcos Vilaça
- Succeeded by: Jorge Oliveira

Secretary of Institutional Affairs
- In office 26 November 2007 – 28 September 2009
- President: Luiz Inácio Lula da Silva
- Preceded by: Walfrido dos Mares Guia
- Succeeded by: Alexandre Padilha

Federal Deputy
- In office 1 February 1991 – 28 September 2009
- Constituency: Pernambuco

Mayor of Rio Formoso
- In office February 1982 – 15 March 1983

Vice Mayor of Rio Formoso
- In office 1 January 1976 – February 1982

Personal details
- Born: José Múcio Monteiro Filho; 25 September 1948 (age 78) Recife, Pernambuco, Brazil
- Party: Independent (since 2009)
- Other political affiliations: ARENA (1966–1979); PDS (1980–1985); PFL (1985–2001); PSB (2001); PSDB (2001–2003); PTB (2003–2009)
- Spouse: Margot Monteiro
- Relatives: Armando Monteiro Filho (uncle); Armando Monteiro Neto (cousin)
- Education: University of Pernambuco
- Occupation: Civil engineer

José Múcio Monteiro Filho (born 25 September 1948) is a Brazilian civil engineer and politician, affiliated with the Democratic Renewal Party (PRD), and is currently Brazil's Defense Minister. He had previously been Minister and president of the Federal Court of Audits (TCU) during the first Luiz Inácio Lula da Silva government and Minister of Institutional Relations during the same government.

== Pernambuco political career ==
Deputy mayor of Rio Formosa, Pernambuco, from 1975 to 1982, he was then elected mayor, but did not complete his mayoral mandate in order to assume the presidency of Electric Company of Pernambuco (CELPE; now Neoenergia Pernambuco), and later the Pernambuco State Department of Transport, between 1982 and 1985. He was affiliated from 1980 to the Social Democratic Party (PDS), migrating later to the Liberal Front Party (PFL), renamed Democrats (DEM) in 2007. He was a candidate for governor of Pernambuco in the 1986 elections. With 1,018,800 votes (39.09%), he came second in the race, losing to Miguel Arraes, with 1,587,726 votes (60.91%).

== Chamber of Deputies ==
In the 1990 elections, he ran for the Chamber of Deputies for the same party. Boosted by the victory of Joaquim Francisco of the PFL as governor, he was elected as the fourth most voted deputy in Pernambuco, with 63,470 votes. In the coalition, he was only behind former governor Roberto Magalhães (PFL), starting his new deputy career with 205 341 votes.

He was re-elected again in the 1994 elections, this time in a coalition with the PSDB candidate Fernando Henrique Cardoso, the favorite in the race for the presidency. With 88,539 votes, he was the fifth most voted deputy in the state, again behind Roberto Magalhães.

In the 1998 elections, he was re-elected in tenth place with 72,991 votes, with the majority of votes from the PFL electorate going to his party partner Inocêncio de Oliveira, who got 162,412 votes.

In 2001, he left the PFL for the Brazilian Social Democracy Party (PSDB), although both parties were coalition partners in the state along with the PMDB. In the 2002 elections, he began his fourth term in 14th place. With 78,610 votes, he trailed fellow coalition member Carlos Eduardo Cadoca (PMDB), state deputy running for the Chamber for the first time, and his 211,864 votes.

In 2003, he joined the Brazilian Labor Party (PTB). Admitted to the Order of Military Merit in 1993 in the rank of Special Commander by President Itamar Franco, Monteiro was promoted in 2003 by Luiz Inácio Lula da Silva to the rank of Grand Officer.

He became notable for being leader of the PTB at the height of what became known as the 2005 monthly allowance scandal, having acted as a defender of the then president of his party, deputy Roberto Jefferson, who had his mandate revoked.

Even so, he was re-elected in the 2006 elections for a fifth term in ninth place with 120,398 votes, his historic maximum. He was behind Armando Monteiro, also from the PTB, with 205 212 votes.

== Minister of Institutional Relations ==
On November 23, 2007, Lula's government leader in the Chamber of Deputies, received and accepted the president's invitation to assume the position of Minister of Institutional Relations, replacing Walfrido dos Mares Guia (PTB/MG), who resigned from the to have his name involved with that of toucan politicians from Minas Gerais, in the so-called "Mensalão tucano".

== Federal Audit Court ==
In 2009, he was nominated to compose the Federal Court of Accounts (TCU), in the vacancy opened by the retirement of Marcos Vilaça, also from Pernambuco, having thus left the ministry and resigned as federal deputy. By 46 votes, his name was approved by the Federal Senate, taking office on October 20, 2009. On December 11, 2018, he was sworn in as president of TCU. On December 31, 2020, he left TCU.

== Minister of Defense ==
In December 2022, he was appointed Minister of Defense in the third Lula government.

Political offices
Preceded by Walfrido dos Mares Guia	Secretary of Institutional Affairs; 2007–2009	Succeeded by Alexandre Padilha
Preceded by Marcos Vilaça	Minister of the Federal Court of Accounts; 2009–2021	Succeeded by Jorge de Oliveira
Preceded by Paulo Sérgio Nogueira	Minister of Defence; 2023–present	Incumbent
