= Northern Military Command (Brazil) =

Eastern Amazon Military Command
- Comando Militar da Amazônia Oriental
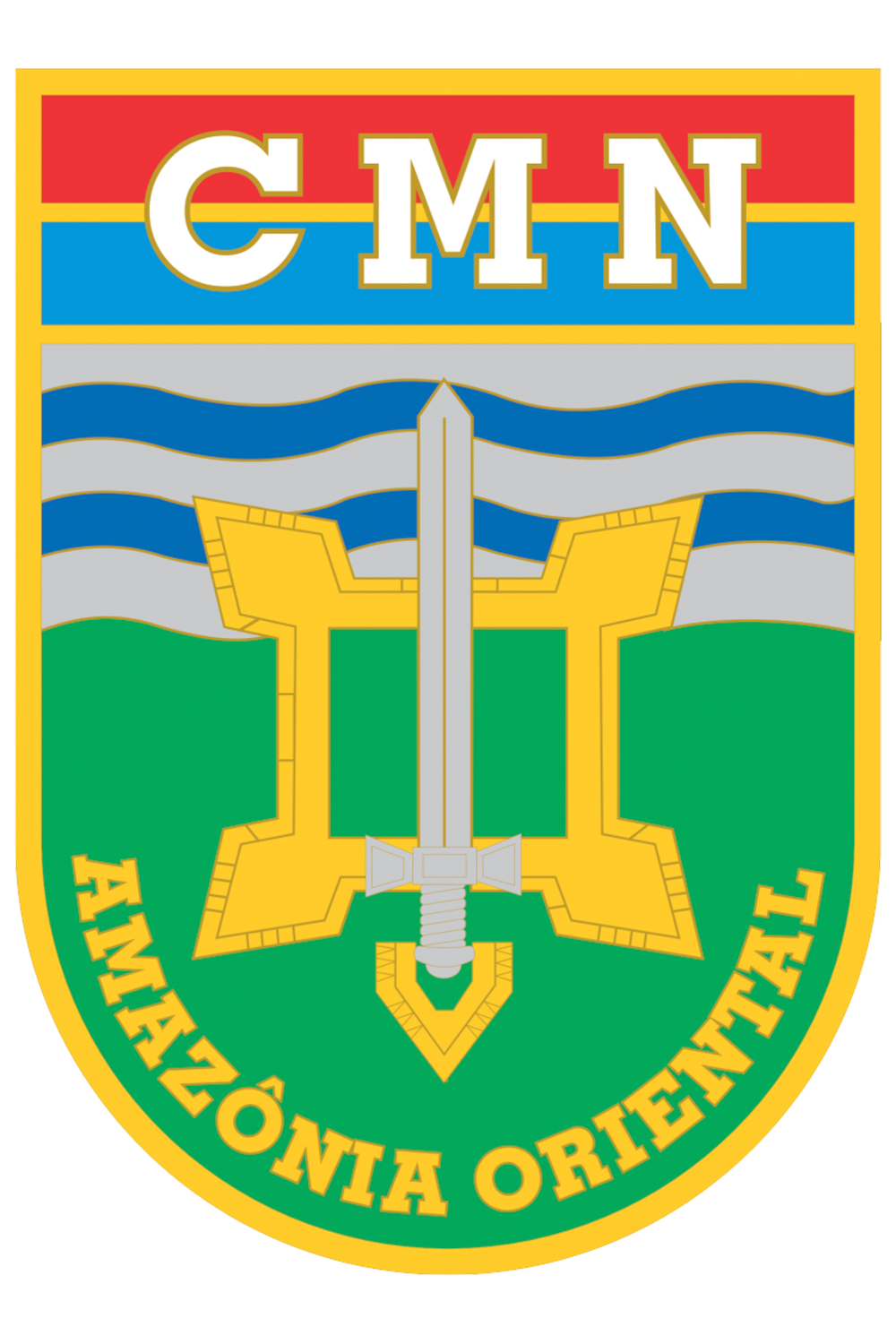
- Coat of Arms
- Active: March 13, 2013; 13 years ago
- Country: Brazil
- Branch: Brazilian Army
- Part of: Ministry of Defence
- Garrison/HQ: Belém do Pará
- Nickname: CMAO
- Website: www.cmao.eb.mil.br

Commanders
- Current commander: General Luciano Guilherme Cabral Pinheiro

The Eastern Amazon Military Command (Portuguese: Comando Miltar da Amazônia Oriental / CMAO), formerly the Northern Military Command (Portuguese: Comando Militar do Norte / CMN) is one of the eight Military Commands of the Brazilian Army. The Northern Military Command is responsible for the defense of Brazil's northern border. The CMAO is the youngest of Brazil's military commands, as it was activated on 13 March 2013. Two Infantry Brigades specializing in Jungle warfare and one Military Regional Command are subordinated to the CMAO. Its area of responsibility covers the states of Maranhão, Pará, and Amapá, as well as the northernmost area of the state of Tocantins.

== Organization ==
Eastern Amazon Military Command Area as of 2024

- Eastern Amazon Military Command (Comando Militar da Amazônia Oriental), in Belém
  - 8rd Military Region Administration and Support Base (Base de Administração e Apoio da 8ª Região Militar), in Belém
  - 8th Military Intelligence Company (8ª Companhia de Inteligência), in Belém
  - 15th Military Police Company (15ª Companhia de Polícia do Exército), in Belém
  - Army Aviation Detachment of the Eastern Amazon Military Command (Destacamento de Aviação do Exército do Comando Militar da Amazônia Oriental) - In Belém
  - 8th Military Region (8ª Região Militar), in Belém covering the Maranhão, Pará and Amapá states
    - 8th Supply Depot (8° Depósito de Suprimentos) - in Belém
    - Regional Works Commission of the 8rd Military Region (Comissão Regional de Obras da 8ª Região Militar) - In Belém
    - 8th Military Region Regional Maintenance Park (Parque Regional de Manutenção da 8ª Região Militar) in Belém
    - Belém General Hospital (Hospital Geral de Belém), in Belém
    - Marabá Garrison Hospital (Hospital de Guarnição de Marabá), in Marabá
    - 8th Logistics Group (8º Grupamento Logístico), in Belém
      - HQ Company 8th Logistics Group (Companhia de Comando do 8º Grupamento Logístico), in Belém
      - 8th Supply Battalion (8º Batalhão de Suprimento), in Belém
      - 8th Transport Battalion (8º Batalhão de Transportes), in Belém
      - 8th Maintenance Battalion (8º Batalhão de Manutenção), in Belém
      - 8th Medical (Reserve) Battalion (8º Batalhão de Saúde), in Belém
  - 22nd Jungle Infantry Brigade (22ª Brigada de Infantaria de Selva), in Macapá
    - HQ Company 22nd Jungle Infantry Brigade (Companhia de Comando da 22ª Brigada de Infantaria de Selva), in Macapá
    - 2nd Jungle Infantry Battalion (2º Batalhão de Infantaria de Selva), in Belém
    - 24th Light Infantry Battalion (24º Batalhão de Infantaria Leve), in São Luís
    - Amapá Frontier Command/ 34th Jungle Infantry Battalion (Comando de Fronteira Amapá/ 34º Batalhão de Infantaria de Selva), in Macapá
  - 23rd Jungle Infantry Brigade (23ª Brigada de Infantaria de Selva) in Marabá
    - HQ Company 23rd Jungle Infantry Brigade (Companhia de Comando da 23ª Brigada de Infantaria de Selva), in Marabá
    - 50th Jungle Infantry Battalion (50º Batalhão de Infantaria de Selva), in Imperatriz
    - 51st Jungle Infantry Battalion (51º Batalhão de Infantaria de Selva), in Altamira
    - 52nd Jungle Infantry Battalion (52º Batalhão de Infantaria de Selva), in Marabá
    - 53rd Jungle Infantry Battalion (53º Batalhão de Infantaria de Selva), in Itaituba
    - 1st Jungle Field Artillery Group (1º Grupo de Artilharia de Campanha de Selva), in Marabá
    - 23rd Jungle Logistics Battalion (23º Batalhão Logístico de Selva), in Marabá
    - 23rd Jungle Cavalry Squadron (23º Esquadrão de Cavalaria de Selva), in Tucuruí
    - 6th Jungle Combat Engineering Company (6ª Companhia de Engenharia de Combate de Selva), in Marabá
    - 23rd Jungle Signals Company (23ª Companhia de Comunicações de Selva), in Marabá
    - 33rd Military Police Platoon (33º Pelotão de Polícia do Exército), in Marabá
