= Jorge de Oliveira =

Brazilian sports shooter

Personal information
- Born: 31 May 1916 São Paulo, Brazil
- Died: 2 February 1999 (aged 82)

Sport
- Sport: Sports shooting

Jorge de Oliveira (31 May 1916 – 2 February 1999) was a Brazilian sports shooter. He competed in the 50 m pistol event at the 1952 Summer Olympics.
