= Silvinei Vasques =

Brazilian politician (born 1975)

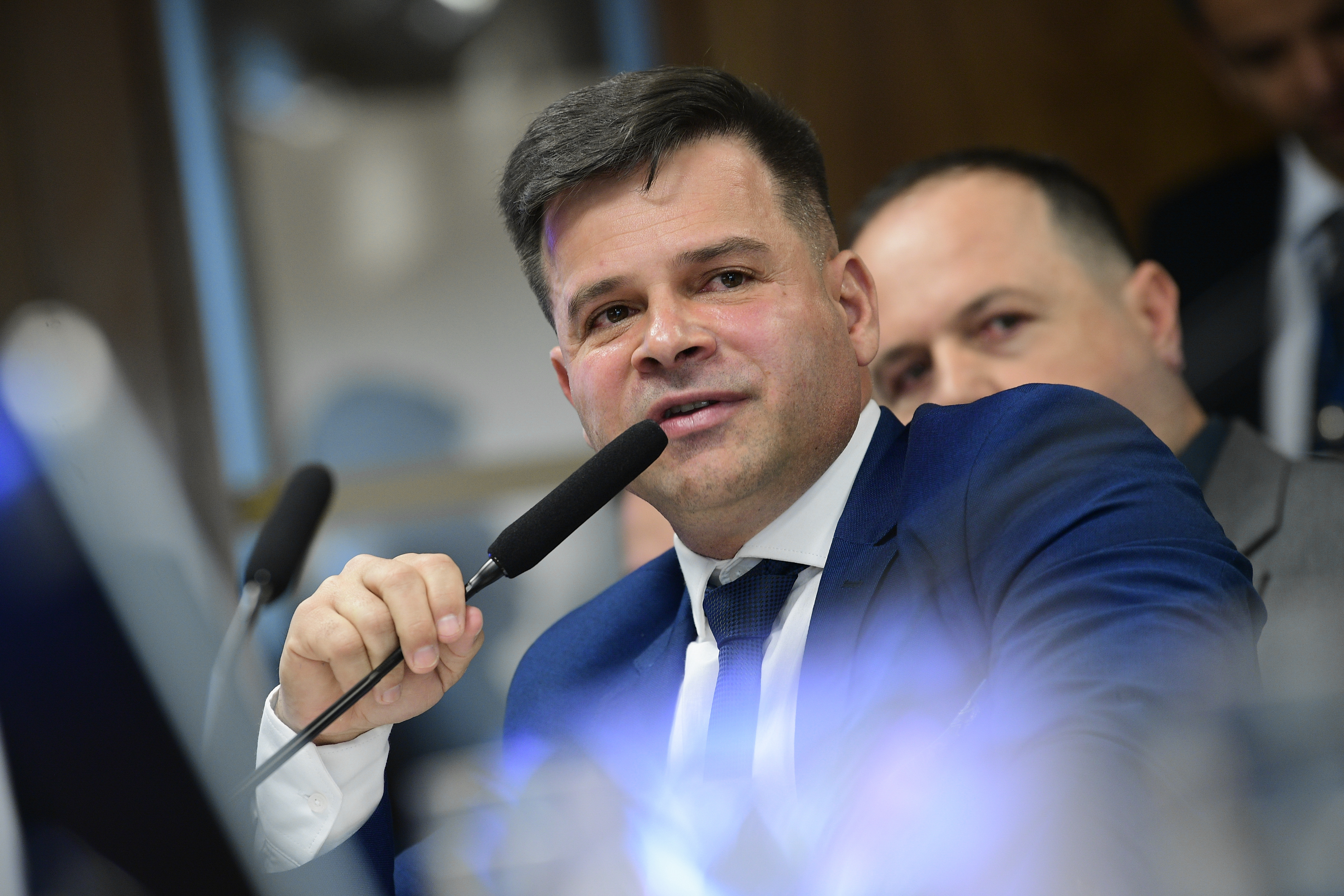
- Vasques in 2023

Director General of the Federal Highway Police
- In office 7 April 2021 – 20 December 2022
- President: Jair Bolsonaro
- Preceded by: Eduardo Aggio
- Succeeded by: Antônio Oliveira

Personal details
- Born: 9 January 1975 (age 51) Ivaiporã, Brazil

Silvinei Vasques (born 9 January 1975) is a Brazilian politician serving as secretary of social development and innovation of São José in 2025. From 2021 to 2022, he served as director general of the Federal Highway Police.

In December 2025, Vasques was arrested in Asunción, Paraguay after cutting his ankle monitoring device and escaping Brazil, while he was awaiting sentencing by the Supreme Federal Court for the January 8 attempted coup against the Lula administration. Vasques was arrested with a fake passport and a card that claimed that he could not speak because of a brain cancer treatment that left him deaf and mute. He had tried to board a flight at Silvio Pettirossi International Airport to Panama on his way to El Salvador. He was subsequently extradited to Brazil.
