= Paulo Sérgio Nogueira de Oliveira =

Commander of the Brazilian Army

General Paulo Sérgio Nogueira
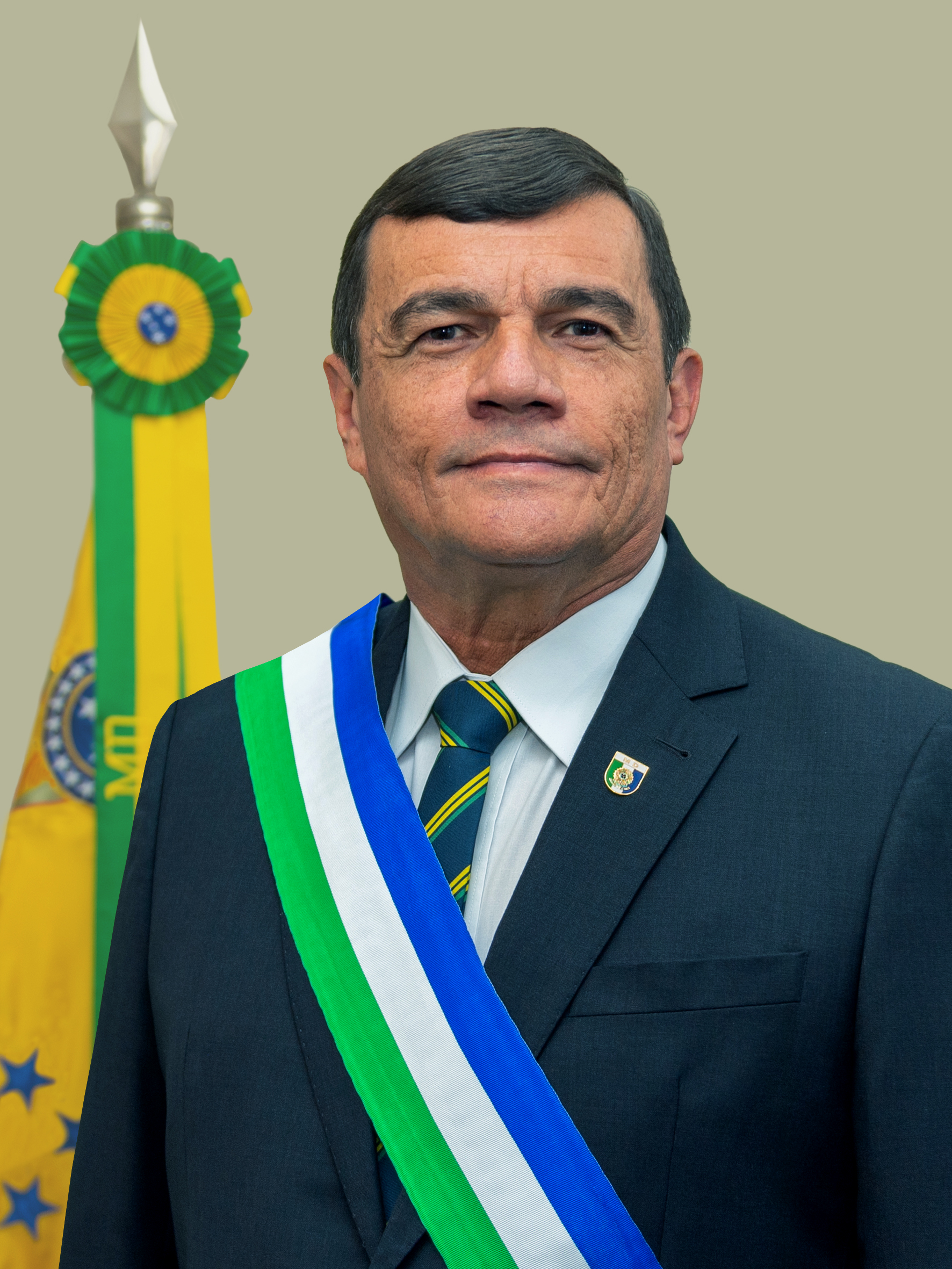

Minister of Defence
- In office 31 March 2022 – 1 January 2023
- President: Jair Bolsonaro
- Preceded by: Walter Braga Netto
- Succeeded by: José Múcio

Commander of the Brazilian Army
- In office 31 March 2021 – 31 March 2022
- President: Jair Bolsonaro
- Minister: Walter Braga Netto
- Preceded by: Edson Leal Pujol
- Succeeded by: Marco Antônio Freire Gomes

Northern Military Commander
- In office 23 April 2018 – 26 August 2020
- Preceded by: Carlos Alberto Neiva Barcellos
- Succeeded by: Sérgio de Costa Negraes

Personal details
- Born: Paulo Sérgio Nogueira de Oliveira; 28 August 1958 (age 68) Iguatu, Ceará, Brazil

Military service
- Allegiance: Brazil
- Branch/service: Brazilian Army
- Years of service: 1974–2022
- Rank: Army general
- Commands: 10th Battalion of Light Infantry-Mountain; 16th Brigade of Jungle Infantry; 12th Military Region; Northern Military Command
- Criminal information
- Status: In prison
- Convictions: Attempted violent abolition of the democratic rule of law; Attempted coup d'état; Participation in an armed criminal organization; Qualified damage; Deterioration of protected heritage property
- Trial: Trial for the 2022–2023 Brazilian coup plot (8 – 11 September 2025)
- Penalty: 19 years in prison

Details
- Date apprehended: 25 November 2025
- Imprisoned at: Planalto Military Command; Brasília, Federal District

Paulo Sérgio Nogueira de Oliveira (Note: Portuguese pronunciation: [paw.lu ˈsɛʁ.ʒi.u noˈɡe(j).ɾɐ d͡ʒi o.liˈve(j).ɾɐ]) (born 28 September 1958 in Iguatu) is a Brazilian Army general who served as minister of defence of Brazil.

== Military career ==
From the Military School of Fortaleza, he started his military career on 4 March 1974, at the Brazilian Army Preparatory School for Cadets (EsPCEx), moving in 1977 to the Agulhas Negras Military Academy, where he was promoted to aspirant on 15 December 1980.

During his military life, Nogueira was instructor at the Agulhas Negras Military Academy in three opportunities, being, in one of them, Commander of the Infantry Class.

In 1994, he was Sub-Commander of the 2nd Battalion of Jungle Infantry, in Belém. He was also Staff Official of the 12th Military Region, in Manaus. Commander the 10th Battalion of Light Infantry-Mountain, in Juiz de Fora. Nogueira was head of the 5th Section of Command of the 10th Military Region, in Fortaleza.

Also, as Colonel, he was attache of the Brazilian Army and Air Force Naval Defence in Mexico, Head of the Section of Official Promotions and Sub-Director of the Board of Evaluations and Promotions.

== Military awards ==
- Order of Military Merit (Grand Cross - Grã-Cruz)
- Order of Naval Merit (Grand Officer) (Note: Portuguese: Ordem do Mérito Naval - Grande-Oficial)
- Order of Aeronautical Merit (Grand Officer) (Note: Portuguese: Ordem do Mérito Aeronáutico - Grande-Oficial)
- Order of Military Justice Merit
- Peacemaker Medal (Note: Portuguese: Medalha do Pacificador)
- Medal of Victory
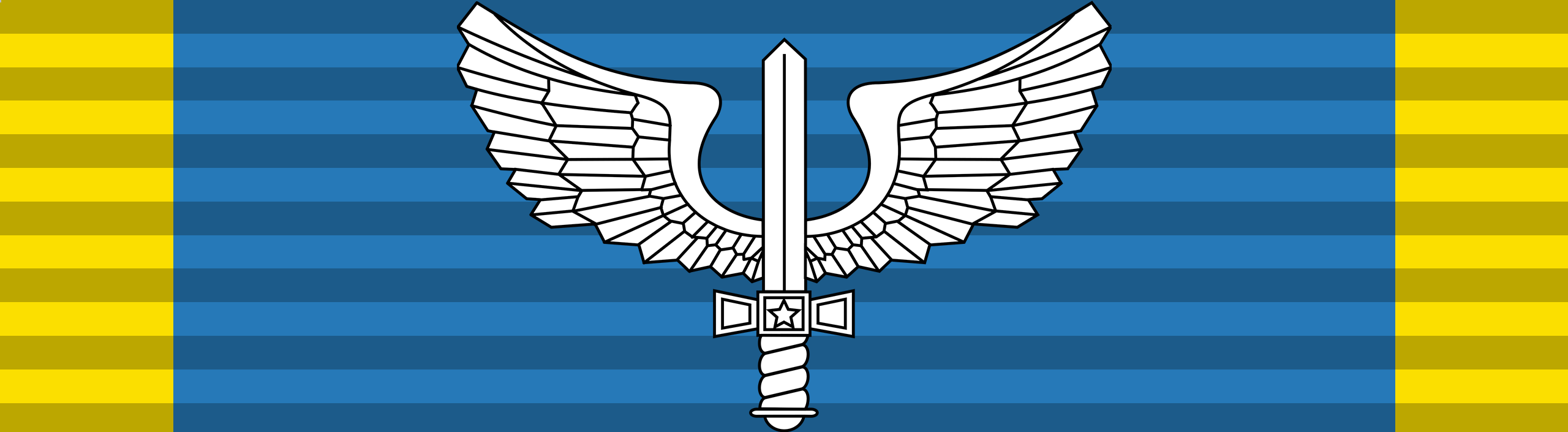
- Santos-Dumont Merit Medal

== Notes ==
Military offices
| Preceded by Carlos Alberto Neiva Barcellos | Commander of the Northern Military Command; 2018–2020 | Succeeded by Sérgio da Costa Negraes |
| Preceded by Edson Leal Pujol | Commander of the Brazilian Army; 2021–2022 | Succeeded by Marco Antônio Freire Gomes |
Political offices
| Preceded by Walter Braga Netto | Minister of Defence; 2022–2023 | Succeeded by José Múcio |
