= Northeastern Military Command (Brazil) =

The Northeastern Military Command (Comando Militar do Nordeste or CMNE) is one of the eight Military Commands of the Brazilian Army. The Northeastern Military Command is responsible for the defense of the states Bahia, Sergipe, Rio Grande do Norte, Paraíba, Pernambuco, Alagoas, Ceará, Piauí, and Maranhão. Three Military Regional Commands are subordinated to the CMNE for administrative purposes.

== Organization ==
Area of the Comando Militar do Nordeste as of 2026

- Northeastern Military Command (Comando Militar do Nordeste) in Recife
  - HQ Company Northeastern Military Command (Companhia de Comando do Comando Militar do Nordeste) in Recife
  - 4th Signals Battalion (4º Batalhão de Comunicações de Exército) in Recife
  - 4th Military Police Battalion (4º Batalhão de Polícia do Exército) in Recife
  - 5th Military Intelligence Company (5ª Companhia de Inteligência) in Recife
  - 6th Military Region (6ª Região Militar) in Salvador covering the Bahia and Sergipe states
    - HQ Company 6th Military Region (Companhia de Comando da 6ª Região Militar) in Salvador
    - 19th Hunters Battalion (19º Batalhão de Caçadores) in Salvador
    - 28th Hunters Battalion (28º Batalhão de Caçadores) in Aracaju
    - 35th Infantry Battalion (35º Batalhão de Infantaria) in Feira de Santana
    - 6th Military Police Battalion (6º Batalhão de Polícia do Exército) in Salvador
    - 1st Infantry Company (1ª Companhia de Infantaria) in Salvador
    - 6th Military Region Regional Maintenance Park (Parque Regional de Manutenção da 6ª Região Militar) in Salvador
    - Salvador General Hospital (Hospital Geral de Salvador) in Salvador
    - 6th Supply Depot (6° Depósito de Suprimentos), in Salvador
  - 7th Military Region (7ª Região Militar) in Recife covering the Rio Grande do Norte, Paraíba, Pernambuco and Alagoas states
    - HQ Company 7th Military Region (Companhia de Comando da 7ª Região Militar) in Recife
    - 7th Support Depot (7º Depósito de Suprimento) in Recife
    - 7th Military Region Regional Maintenance Park (Parque Regional de Manutenção da 7ª Região Militar) in Recife
    - Recife Military Area Hospital (Hospital Militar de Área de Recife) in Recife
    - João Pessoa Garrison Hospital (Hospital da Guarnição de João Pessoa) in João Pessoa
    - Natal Garrison Hospital (Hospital da Guarnição de Natal) in Natal
  - 10th Military Region (10ª Região Militar) in Fortaleza covering the Ceará and Piauí states
    - HQ Company 10th Military Region (Companhia de Comando da 10ª Região Militar) in Fortaleza
    - 23rd Hunters Battalion (23º Batalhão de Caçadores) in Fortaleza
    - 25th Hunters Battalion (25º Batalhão de Caçadores) in Teresina
    - 40th Infantry Battalion (40º Batalhão de Infantaria) in Crateus
    - 16th Army Police Company (16ª Companhia de Polícia do Exército), in Fortaleza
    - 10th Support Depot (10º Depósito de Suprimento) in Fortaleza
    - 10th Military Region Regional Maintenance Park (Parque Regional de Manutenção da 10ª Região Militar) in Fortaleza
    - Fortaleza Garrison Hospital (Hospital da Guarnição de Fortaleza) in Fortaleza
    - Fortaleza Garrison Administrative Base (Base Administrativa da Guarnição de Fortaleza) in Fortaleza
  - 7th Army Division (7ª Divisão de Exército), in Recife
    - HQ Company 7th Army Division (Companhia de Comando da 7ª Divisão de Exército), in Recife
    - 4th Signals and Electronic Warfare Battalion (4.º Batalhão de Comunicações e Guerra Eletrônica), in Recife
    - Marshal Newton Cavalcanti Training Camp (Campo de Instrução Marechal Newton Cavalcanti), in Araçoiaba
    - 7th Motorized Infantry Brigade (7ª Brigada de Infantaria Motorizada) in Natal
      - HQ Company 7th Motorized Infantry Brigade (Companhia de Comando da 7ª Brigada de Infantaria Motorizada) in Natal
      - Natal Garrison Administrative Base (Base Administrativa da Guarnição de Natal) in Natal
      - 15th Motorized Infantry Battalion (15º Batalhão de Infantaria Motorizado) in João Pessoa
      - 16th Motorized Infantry Battalion (16º Batalhão de Infantaria Motorizado) in Natal
      - 31st Motorized Infantry Battalion (31º Batalhão de Infantaria Motorizado) in Campina Grande
      - 17th Field Artillery Group (17º Grupo de Artilharia de Campanha) in Natal
      - 7th Signals Company (7ª Companhia de Comunicações) in Natal
      - 7th Military Police Platoon (7º Pelotão de Polícia do Exército) in Natal
    - 10th Motorized Infantry Brigade (10ª Brigada de Infantaria Motorizada) in Recife
      - HQ Company 10th Motorized Infantry Brigade (Companhia de Comando da 10ª Brigada de Infantaria Motorizada) in Recife
      - 14th Motorized Infantry Battalion (14º Batalhão de Infantaria Motorizado) in Jaboatão dos Guararapes
      - 59th Motorized Infantry Battalion (59º Batalhão de Infantaria Motorizado) in Maceió
      - 71st Motorized Infantry Battalion (71º Batalhão de Infantaria Motorizado) in Garanhuns
      - 72nd Caatinga Infantry Battalion (72º Batalhão de Infantaria de Caatinga) in Petrolina
      - 7th Field Artillery Group (7º Grupo de Artilharia de Campanha) in Olinda
      - 14th Logistics Battalion (14º Batalhão Logístico) in Recife
      - 10th Mechanized Cavalry Squadron (10º Esquadrão de Cavalaria Mecanizado) in Recife
      - 10th Combat Engineer Company (10ª Companhia de Engenharia de Combate) in São Bento do Una
      - 10th Signals Company (10ª Companhia de Comunicações) in Recife
      - 10th Military Police Platoon (10º Pelotão de Polícia do Exército) in Recife
  - 1st Engineer Group (1º Grupamento de Engenharia) in João Pessoa
    - HQ Company 1st Engineer Group (Companhia de Comando do 1º Grupamento de Engenharia) in João Pessoa
    - 1st Construction Engineer Battalion (1º Batalhão de Engenharia de Construção) in Caicó
    - 2nd Construction Engineer Battalion (2º Batalhão de Engenharia de Construção) in Teresina
    - 3rd Construction Engineer Battalion (3º Batalhão de Engenharia de Construção) in Picos
    - 4th Construction Engineer Battalion (4º Batalhão de Engenharia de Construção) in Barreiras
    - 7th Combat Engineer Battalion (7º Batalhão de Engenharia de Combate) in Natal
    - João Pessoa Garrison Administrative Base (Base Administrativa da Guarnição de João Pessoa) in João Pessoa
    - Regional Works Commission 7 (Comissão Regional de Obras 7) in Recife

=== Organization graphic ===
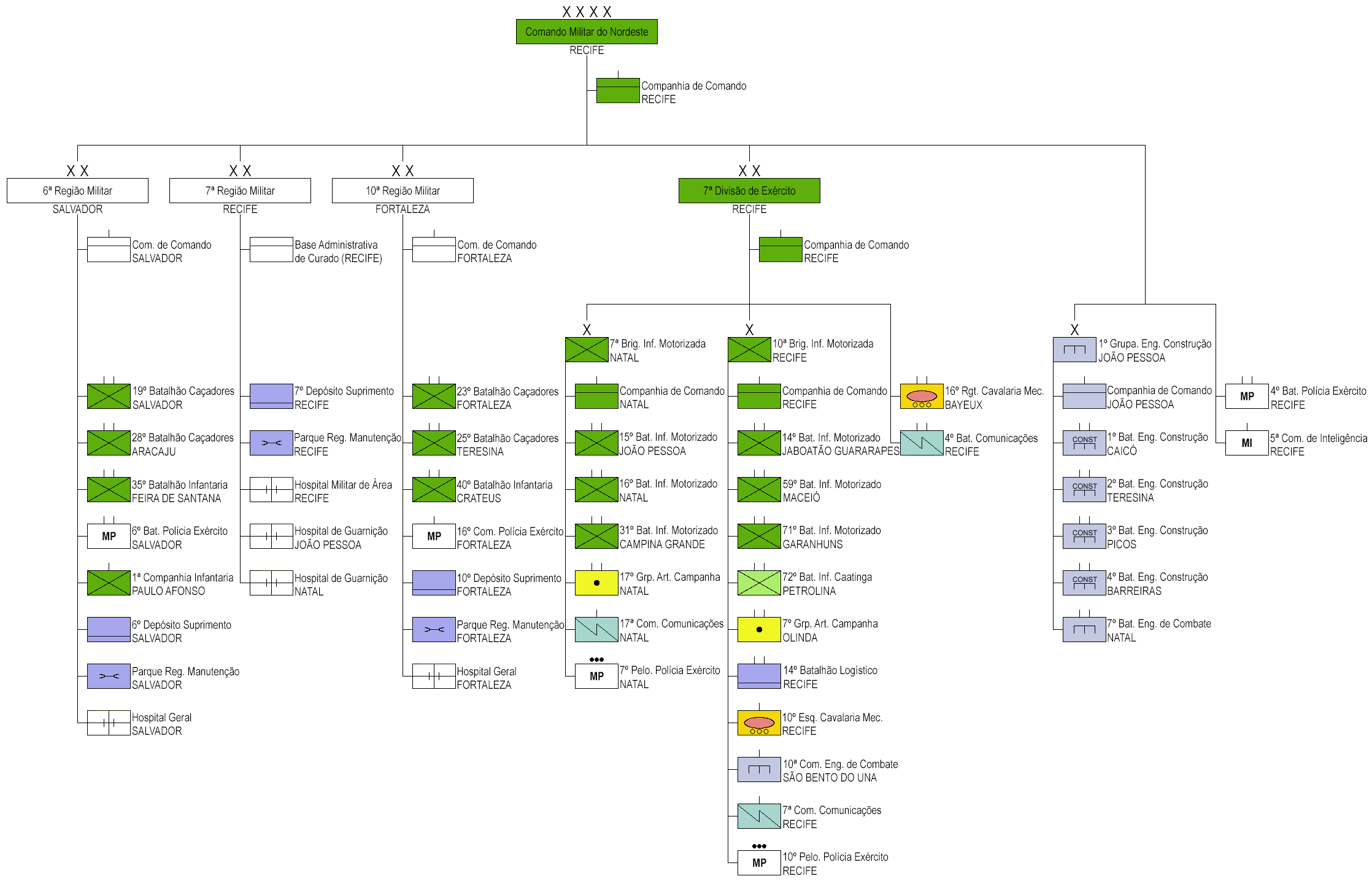
North Eastern Military Command organization 2026 (click image to enlarge)
