= List of commanders of the Academia Militar das Agulhas Negras =

This is the list of Commanders of the Academia Militar das Agulhas Negras. The list includes the Commanders of the schools prior to the AMAN that were located in Rio de Janeiro. Since its installation in Resende, which occurred in 1944, AMAN had 43 effective Commanders.

== Academia Real Militar (1811-1822) ==
Number	Name
1	Lieutenant-General Carlos Antônio Napion
2	Lieutenant-General Francisco de Borja Garção Stockler
3	Marshall Joaquim de Oliveira Álvares
4	Brigadier Joaquim Norberto Xavier de Brito

== Imperial Academia Militar (1823-1831) ==
Number	Name
1	Brigadier Manuel da Costa Pinto
2	Colonel Manuel José de Oliveira

== Academia Militar da Corte (1832-1838) ==
Number	Name
1	Colonel José de Souza Corrêa
2	Brigadier Raimundo José da Cunha
3	Colonel Manoel José de Oliveira
4	Brigadier João Paulo dos Santos

== Escola Militar (1839-1857) ==
Number	Name
1	Brigadier Salvador José Maciel
2	Colonel Vicente Antônio Buys
3	Colonel José dos Santos Oliveira
4	Colonel Firmino Herculano de Morais Âncora
5	Lieutenant-General Francisco de Paula Vasconcelos
6	Brigadier Antônio Joaquim de Souza
7	Colonel Antônio Manoel de Melo

== Escola de Aplicação do Exército (1855-1858) ==
Number	Name
1	Brigadier Jerônimo Francisco Coelho
2	Colonel Polidoro da Fonseca Quintanilha Jordão

== Escola Central (1858-1866) ==
Number	Name
1	Brigadier Antônio Joaquim de Souza
2	Brigadier Pedro de Alcântara Belegarde
3	Brigadier Manoel Felizardo de Souza Melo
4	Marshall José Maria da Silva Bittencourt

== Escola Militar (1860-1879) ==
Number	Name
1	Brigadier Polidoro da Fonseca Quintanilha Jordão
2	Brigadier Severiano Martins da Fonseca

== Escola Militar da Corte (1881-1888) ==
Number	Name
1	Brigadier Severiano Martins da Fonseca
2	Brigadier Agostinho Marques de Sá
3	Brigadier José Clorindo de Queiroz

== Escola Militar da Capital Federal (1889-1897) ==
Number	Name
1	Brigadier José Clorindo de Queiroz
2	Major-General Bibiano Sérgio Macedo da Fontoura Costallat
3	Major-General Raimundo Ewerton Quadros
4	Major-General Francisco Carlos da Luz
5	Major-General Miguel Maria Girard
6	Major-General Roberto Trompowsky Leitão de Almeida

== Escola Militar do Brasil (1898-1904) ==
Number	Name
1	Major-General Francisco José Teixeira Júnior
2	Major-General Carlos Eugênio de Andrade Guimarães
3	Major-General Bibiano Sérgio Macedo da Fontoura Costallat

== Escola de Guerra (1906-1911) ==
Number	Name
1	Colonel Carlos Augusto Campos
2	Colonel Oscar de Oliveira Miranda
3	Colonel Agrícola Ewerton Pinto

== Escola Militar do Realengo (1912-1944) ==
Number	Name	Begin	End
1	Colonel Antônio De Albuquerque Sousa	June 4, 1912	November 14, 1914
2	Major-General Ildefonso Pires de Morais Castro	November 14, 1914	March 4, 1915
3	Colonel Augusto Maria Sisson	March 4, 1915	November 14, 1917
4	Major-General Eduardo Artur Sócrates	November 14, 1917	May 10, 1919
5	Major-General José Maria Moreira Guimarães	May 10, 1919	October 8, 1919
6	Major-General Eduardo Monteiro de Barros	October 8, 1919	August 2, 1922
7	Major-General José Joaquim Firmino	August 2, 1922	January 31, 1923
8	Major-General Estanislau Vieira Pamplona	January 31, 1923	July 17, 1923
9	Major-General Marciano de Oliveira Ávila	July 17, 1923	November 30, 1927
10	Major-General Gil Antônio Dias de Almeida	November 30, 1927	May 5, 1928
11	Major-General Constâncio Deschamps Cavalcanti	May 5, 1928	November 1, 1930
12	Major-General José Vitoriano Aranha da Silva	November 1, 1930	November 19, 1930
13	Major-General José Pessoa	November 19, 1930	August 7, 1934
14	Major-General José Meira de Vasconcelos	August 7, 1934	July 18, 1935
15	Major-General João Batista Mascarenhas de Morais	July 18, 1935	August 5, 1937
16	Major-General Renato Paquet	August 5, 1937	April 7, 1938
17	Major-General Mário José Pinto Guedes	April 7, 1938	June 7, 1939
18	Major-General Álvaro Fiúza de Castro	June 7, 1939	December 27, 1940
19	Major-General Álcio Souto	December 27, 1940	January 9, 1943
20	Colonel Mário Travassos	January 9, 1943	February 28, 1944
21	Professor Colonel Augusto da Cunha Duque Estrada; commanded in 1944 the courses that stayed in Realengo (2nd and 3rd years), while Colonel Mário Travassos went to Resende to install the first year in the new Military Academy.	March 1, 1944	December 31, 1944

== Escola Militar de Resende (1944-1951) ==
Number	Name	Begin	End
1	Colonel Mário Travassos	March 1, 1944	December 27, 1945
2	Major-General Aristóteles de Sousa Dantas	December 27, 1945	November 25, 1946
3	Major-General Álvaro Patti de Aguiar	November 25, 1946	February 20, 1948
4	Major-General Ciro do Espírito Santo Cardoso	February 20, 1948	March 10, 1950
5	Major-General Manuel de Azambuja Brilhante	March 10, 1950	March 31, 1951

== Academia Militar das Agulhas Negras (1951-present) ==
Number	Name	Begin	End
6	Major-General Nestor Souto de Oliveira	March 31, 1951	November 25, 1952
7	Major-General Jair Dantas Ribeiro	November 25, 1952	May 20, 1955
8	Major-General Júlio Teles de Menezes	May 20, 1955	March 20, 1956
9	Major-General Hugo Panasco Alvim	March 20, 1956	January 30, 1958
10	Major-General João Punaro Bley	January 30, 1958	February 1, 1960
11	Major-General Adalberto Pereira dos Santos	February 1, 1960	February 5, 1962
12	Major-General Pedro Geraldo de Almeida	February 5, 1962	March 4, 1963
13	Major-General Emílio Garrastazu Médici	March 4, 1963	May 8, 1964
14	Major-General Alfredo Souto Malan	May 8, 1964	December 8, 1966
15	Major-General Ariel Pacca da Fonseca	December 8, 1966	November 28, 1967
16	Major-General Adolpho João de Paula Couto	November 28, 1967	May 2, 1969
17	Major-General Carlos de Meira Mattos	May 2, 1969	February 4, 1971
18	Major-General José Fragomeni	February 4, 1971	February 19, 1974
19	Major-General Túlio Chagas Nogueira	February 19, 1974	February 12, 1976
20	Major-General Sylvio Octávio do Espírito Santo	February 12, 1976	February 15, 1978
21	Major-General Hyran Ribeiro Arnt	February 15, 1978	February 5, 1981
22	Major-General Ramiro Monteiro de Castro	February 5, 1981	February 16, 1984
23	Major-General Rubens Bayma Denys	February 16, 1984	April 10, 1985
24	Major-General Braz Monteiro Campos	April 10, 1985	December 17, 1985
25	Major-General Délio de Assis Monteiro	December 17, 1985	February 18, 1989
26	Major-General Tamoyo Pereira das Neves	February 18, 1989	March 3, 1990
27	Major-General José Ary Lacombe	March 3, 1990	February 7, 1992
28	Major-General Rubem Augusto Taveira	February 7, 1992	February 18, 1994
29	Major-General Max Hoertel	February 18, 1994	May 5, 1995
30	Major-General Ivan de Mendonça Bastos	May 5, 1995	February 22, 1997
31	Major-General José Mauro Moreira Cupertino	February 22, 1997	February 11, 1999
32	Lieutenant-General Domingos Carlos de Campos Curado	February 11, 1999	February 5, 2001
33	Major-General Reinaldo Cayres Minati	February 5, 2001	February 8, 2003
34	Major-General Claudimar Magalhães Nunes	February 8, 2003	February 12, 2005
35	Major-General Marco Antônio de Farias	February 12, 2005	February 10, 2007
36	Major-General Gerson Menandro Garcia de Freitas	February 10, 2007	April 25, 2009
37	Lieutenant-General Edson Leal Pujol	April 25, 2009	April 29, 2011
38	Major-General Júlio Cesar de Arruda	April 29, 2011	April 23, 2013
39	Lieutenant-General Tomás Miguel Miné Ribeiro Paiva	April 23, 2013	April 23, 2015
40	Lieutenant-General André Luis Novaes Miranda	April 23, 2015	April 25, 2017
41	Lieutenant-General Ricardo Augusto Ferreira Costa Neves	April 25, 2017	December 12, 2018
42	Major-General Gustavo Henrique Dutra de Menezes	December 12, 2018	September 11, 2020
43	Major-General Paulo Roberto Rodrigues Pimentel	September 11, 2020	April,12, 2022
44	Major-General João Felipe Dias Alves	April,12, 2022	-

== See also ==
- Brazilian Army
- Academia Militar das Agulhas Negras
- Escola de Comando e Estado-Maior do Exército (Brazil)
- List of Commanders of the Escola de Comando e Estado-Maior do Exército (Brazil)
- Preparatory School of the Brazilian Army (Escola Preparatória de Cadetes do Exército)

== Bibliography ==
- Bento, Cláudio Moreira. "Os 60 anos da Academia Militar das Agulhas Negras em Resende – RJ"
- Braga, Gustavo Lisboa. "Da Casa do Trem à AMAN"
