= Mário Travassos =

Brazilian marshal

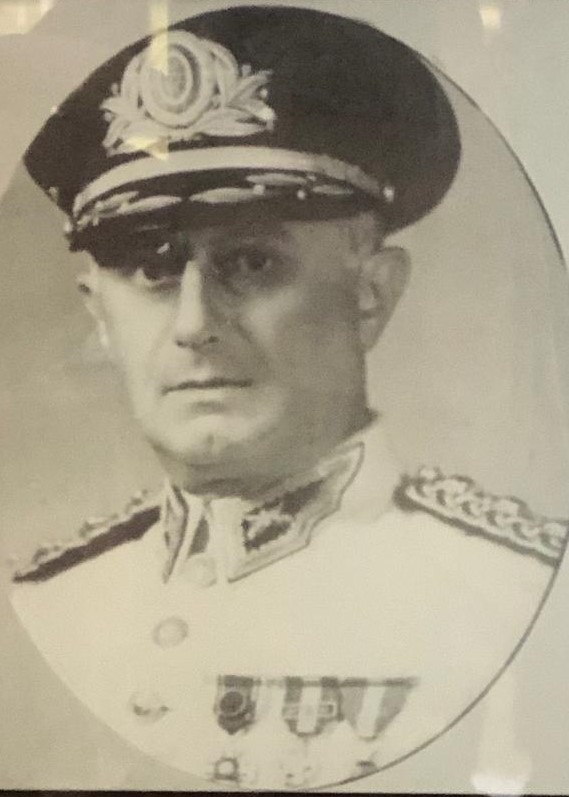
- Born: January 20, 1891; Rio de Janeiro, RJ, Brazil
- Died: July 20, 1973 (aged 82) Rio de Janeiro, RJ, Brazil
- Allegiance: Brazil
- Branch: Army
- Rank: Marshal
- Conflicts: Italian campaign
- Awards: Military Order of the Tower and Sword
- Alma mater: Colégio Militar de Porto Alegre

Mário Travassos (January 20, 1891 – July 20, 1973) was a Brazilian marshal and writer. His 1935 book Projeção Continental do Brasil is considered a foundational work in Brazilian geopolitical thought.

== Biography ==
Born in Rio de Janeiro, Travassos was the son of a general. He enrolled at the traditional Military School of Porto Alegre (pt) in 1908 and graduated three years later. He took part in the Contestado War before being promoted to senior lieutenant in 1920 and to major in 1925.

In the early 1940s, Travassos served at the Brazilian Army General Staff and was appointed instructor at the Command and General Staff School. Around this time, he commanded the 8º Batalhão de Caçadores. As a colonel, he contributed to the founding of the Military Academy of Agulhas Negras, of which he was one of the idealizers. He served in the Brazilian Expeditionary Force during the Second World War.
