= Chrisóstomo de Moura =

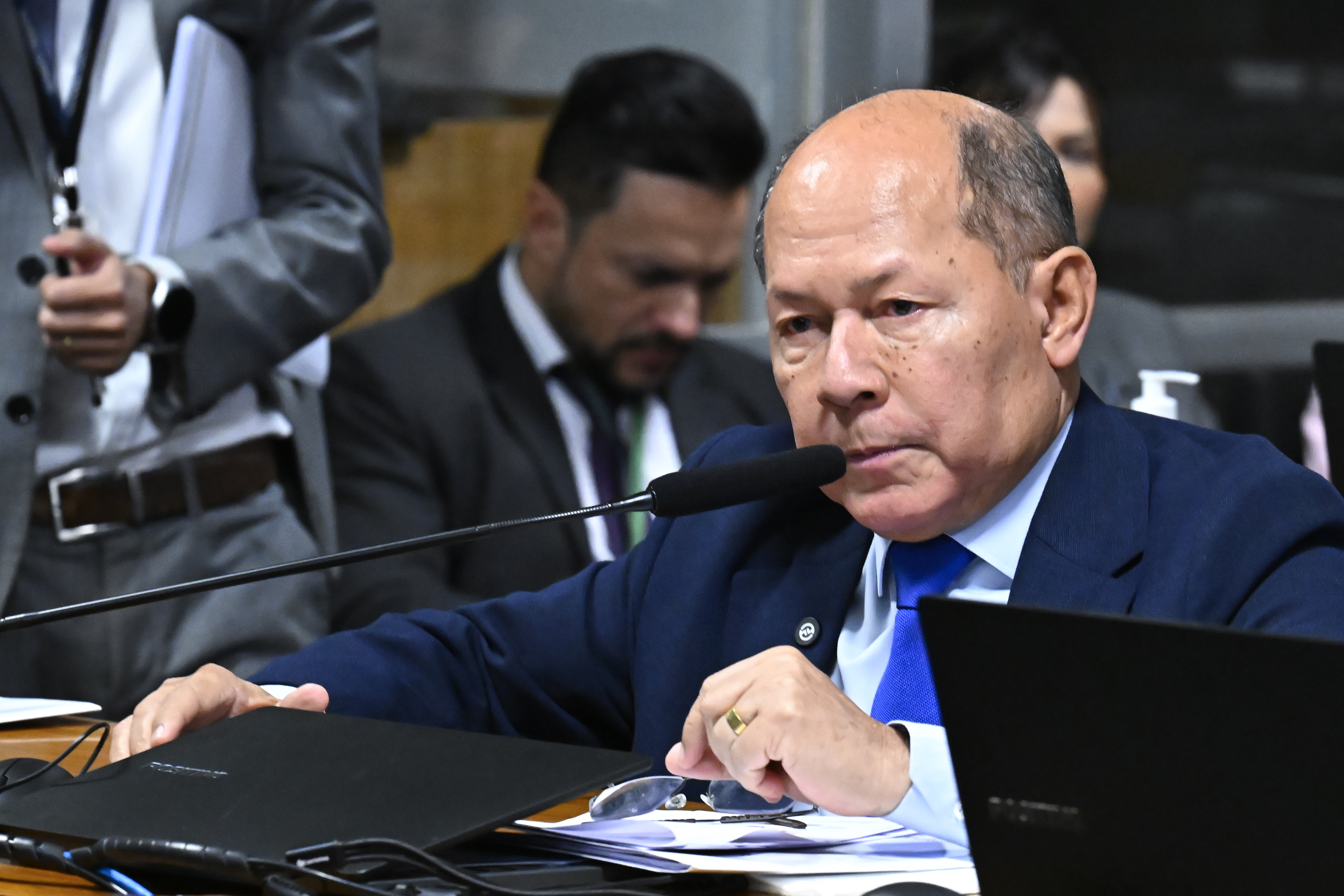
Coronel Chrisóstomo

Chrisóstomo de Moura, also known as Coronel Chrisóstomo (born June 23, 1959 in Tefé, Amazonas), is a Brazilian politician and military officer affiliated with the Liberal Party (PL).

In the 2018 elections, he was elected federal deputy for the state of Rondônia with 28.344 votes (3.62% of valid votes) and took office on February 1, 2019. He was reelected for the Liberal Party in 2022.

Colonel Chrisóstomo studied at the Military College of Manaus, entering the Military Academy of Agulhas Negras in 1980, completing the course in 1984, graduating as an Aspirant Officer in the Engineering Corps.

He is Vice-President of the Parliamentary Front for Biodiesel and a member of the Public Security and National Defense Committees.
