= Escola Preparatória de Cadetes do Exército =

Coordinates: 22.8826°S 47.0810°W

Brazilian Army Preparatory School of Cadets
- Escola Preparatória de Cadetes do Exército
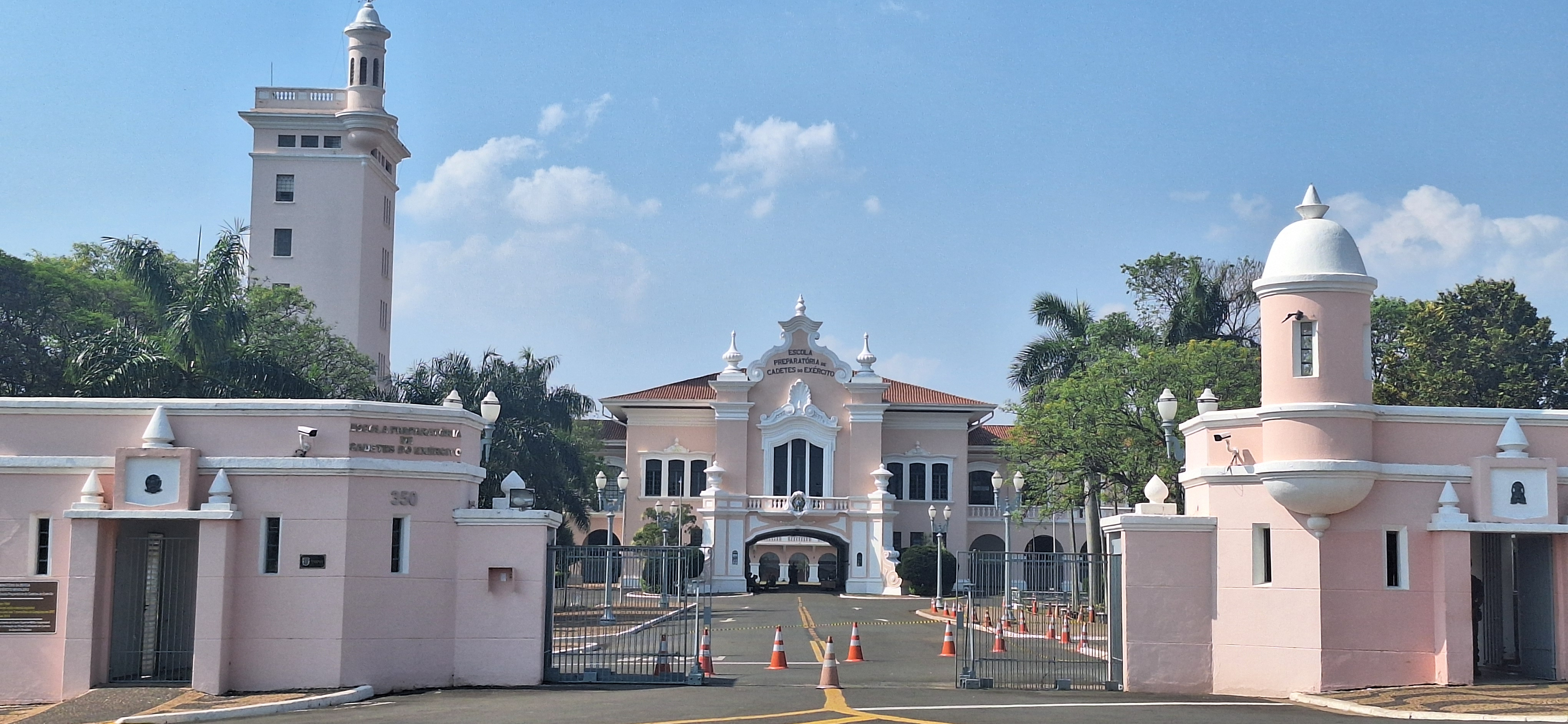
- Campinas, São Paulo; Brazil

Information
- Established: 1940
- Affiliation: Brazilian Army

The Escola Preparatória de Cadetes do Exército - EsPCEx (Brazilian Army Preparatory School of Cadets) is a coeducational one-year military school in Campinas, São Paulo, Brazil. EsPCEx started construction in 1944, but due to budget constraints, did not open until the late 1960's.

EsPCEx is for students wanting to become commissioned officers in the Brazilian Armed Forces. It prepares candidates for entrance into the Academia Militar das Agulhas Negras (AMAN).

The coursework at EsPCEx compares to the first year at a regular higher education institution, but with the addition of military subjects. There is also an emphasis on physical training.

After graduating from EsPCEx, students enter AMAN or received the Reserve Certificate for the military service they performed at EsPCEx. In 2012, EsPCEx became the first level of the five year course for Brazilian Army Battle Commissioned Officers; the other four levels of the course are performed at AMAN.

== History ==
=== Origins ===
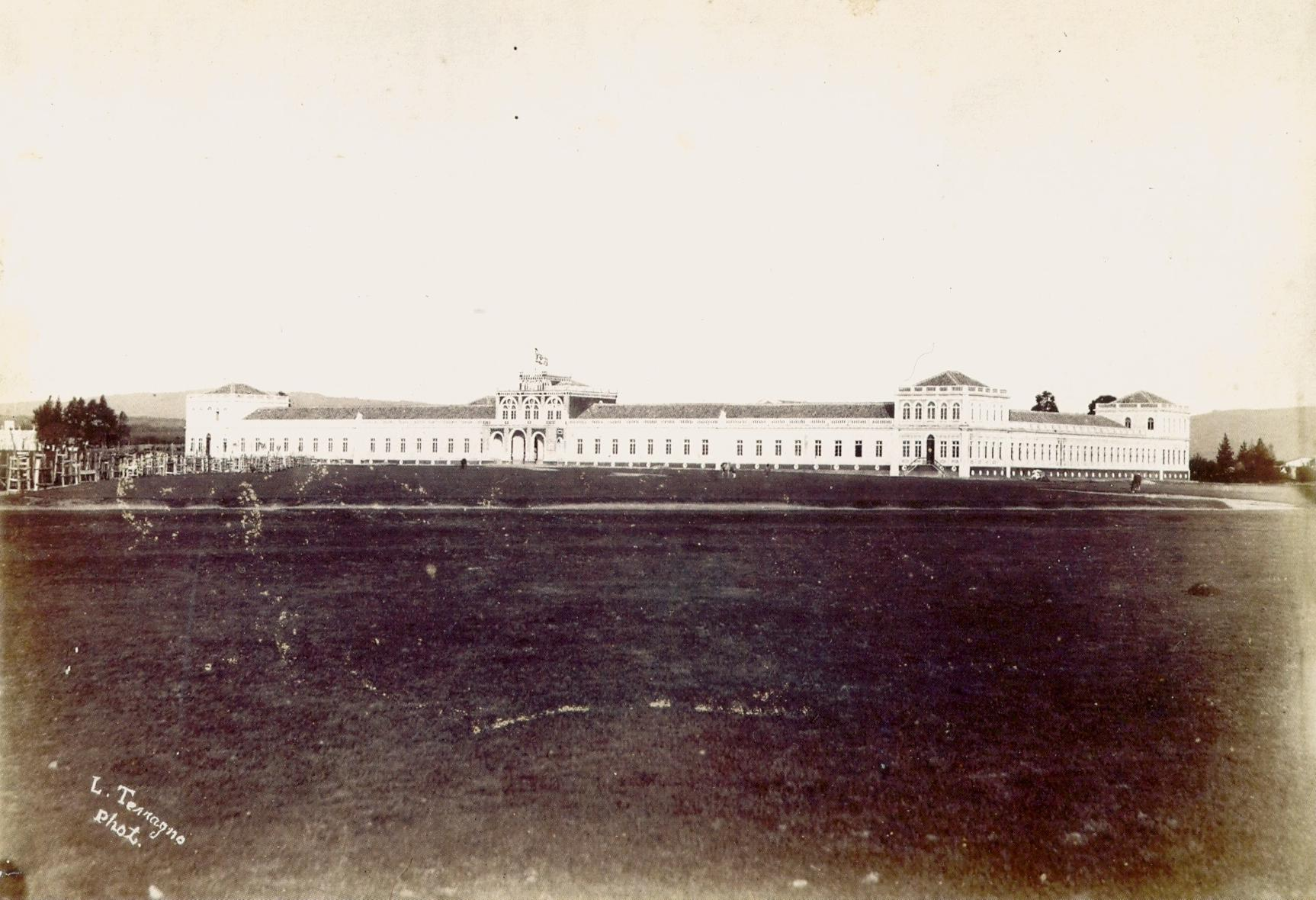
One of the campus in Porto Alegre, in 1885.

Preparatory teaching for Brazilian Army officer candidates began in 1939. The f Colégio Militar de Porto Alegre, located in Porto Alegre. was transformed into the Escola de Formação de Cadetes" (later called Escola Preparatória de Porto Alegre (EPPA)). In 1942, the Escola Preparatória de Fortaleza (EPF), located in Fortaleza, was also founded.

In 1944, the Army decided to consolidate EPPA and EPF into a single school to be constructed in Campinas.

=== Start of project ===
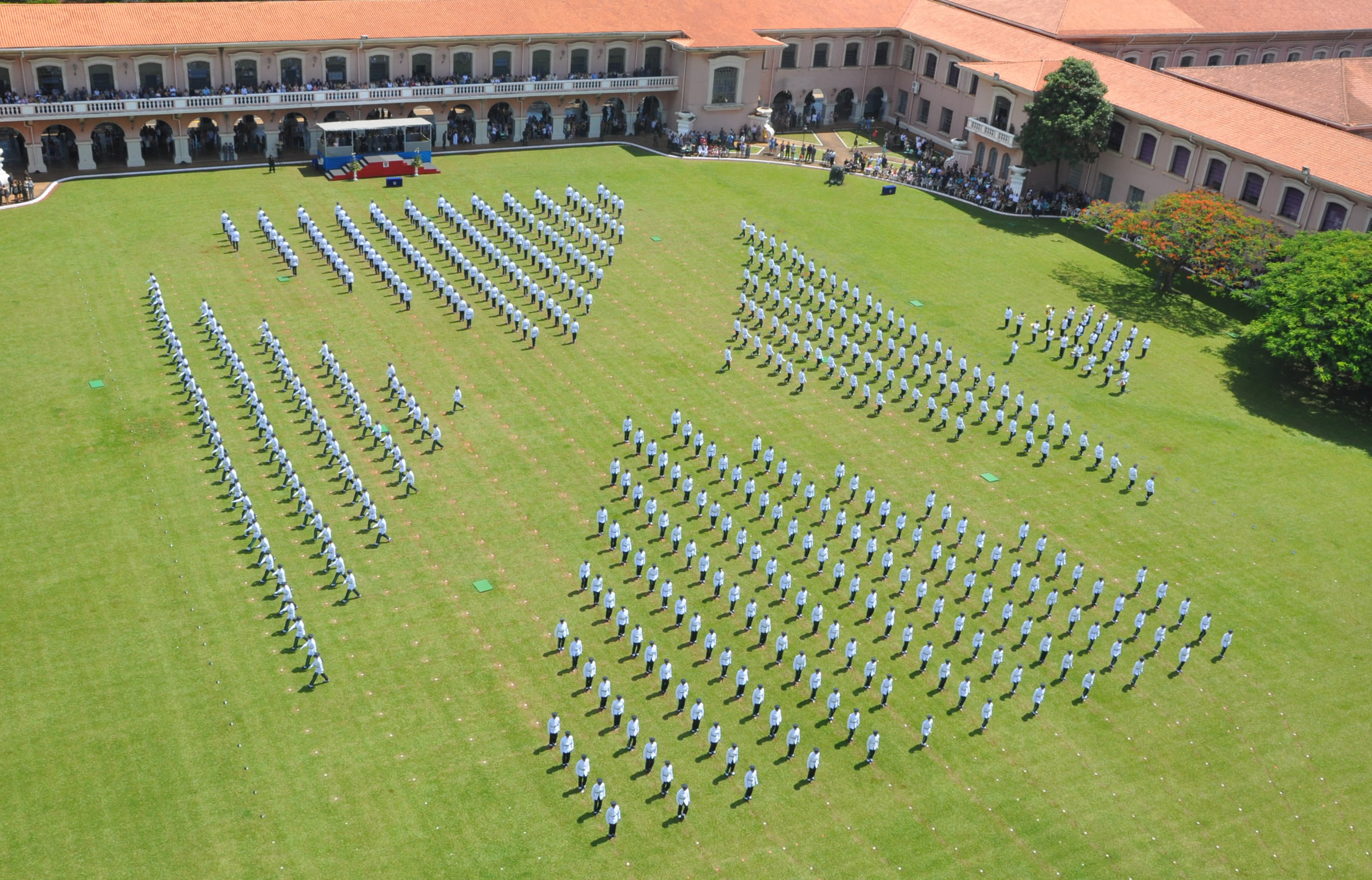
A ceremony inside the EsPCEx compound.

The Government of São Paulo state agreed to provide the land and fund the construction of the EsPCEx campus in Campinas in 1944. Under an agreement with the Ministry of War and the state, the architect Hernani do Val Penteado was hired for the project. He described it as such.

"This project is a set of four pavilions, around a huge arms square and, for ease of movement, counting on large galleries in the inner face. Why four pavilions? Because three of them were designated to the students in preparation for each of the three armed forces (Navy, Army, Air Force), and the last pavilion was done to the basic course which was attended by the freshmen. "

The Government of São Paulo State led the work on EsPCEx until the covenant stage and then pass it to the Ministry of War. However, the Ministry lack the funds to finish the construction and work stopped for the next 14 years. The state eventually annulled their donation.

=== Revival of project ===
In 1958, the Army became interested in EsPCEx again. Contacts made by the then Commander of the Second Army with the State Government resulted in a message to the Legislative Assembly, dated April 29, 1958, transmitting the Law Project number 555. It authorized the State Treasury to sell, on giving to the Ministry of War, the property for the installation of EsPCEx. The evaluator of the State, when assessing the Law Project said:

"The building was built for military purposes, because its original destination was the installation of a preparatory school of cadets in Campinas. Its external appearance and its appearance as a whole, however, does not denounce a headquarters. It's beautiful and pleasing to look, with its colonial style facade. Its structure, too heavy, is what it shows for what purpose it was built. It was anticipated, of course, a inexpugnable fortress.

The Finance Committee of the Legislative Assembly, to give its assent to the donation, wrote: "It is a measure of maximum interest to the Ministry of War and also to our state, in whose territory will be installed an educational establishment for the preparation of future Army officers. " The donation of the property occurred, solemnly, on August 25, 1958. Finally, in the following year, the school was transferred to Campinas.

=== Extinction ===
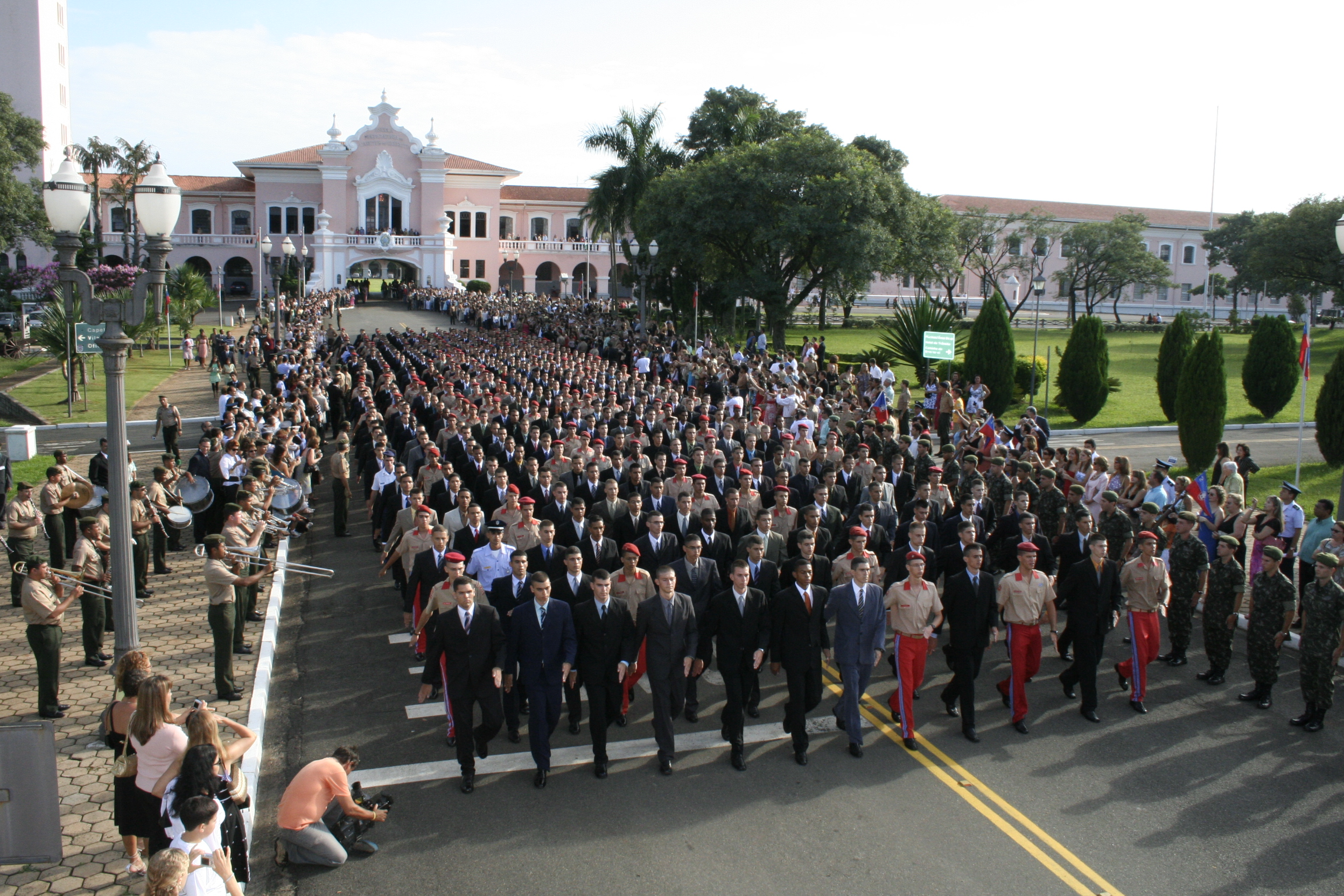
Solemnity of Entry into the Gates

The difficulties were not restricted only to the construction. Decree Number 166 of November 17, 1961, turned the Preparatory Schools of Army Cadets of Porto Alegre and Fortaleza into lower-level Military Schools (Colégios Militares) and its Article 3 read: "The Preparatory School of Army Cadets in Campinas will be extinguished on December 31, 1963, and from the academic year 1962, it will no longer receive new students for the first year."

Public opinion from Campinas rose up against that measure and pressed the government for the permanence of the educational establishment in the city. The decision was revoked on November 26, 1963, when the deadline for its closure was almost expiring.

The finishing work on EsPCEx were restarted in 1967, and its name was changed from "Preparatory School of Campinas" to "Preparatory School of Army Cadets." The changes involved their physical area, its facilities, its servers and its curriculum.

=== Modern history ===
In 1991, EsPCEx shifting from a three-year to a one-year program.

Ordinance 152 of the Army Chief of Staff, on 16 November 2010, implemented the new system of the Higher Education Course for Brazilian Army Battle Commissioned Officers. The course of Bachelor of Military Sciences changed to five years; the first year at EsPCEx and the remaining four at AMAN. At that time, many subjects that are not directly related to the military profession started to be taught in the school.

In 2017, EsPCEx welcomed its first batch of women officer cadets.

== The School today ==
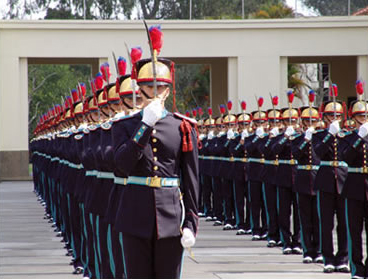
Agulhas Negras Military Academy

=== The Course ===
EsPCEx has approximately 520 students from all over Brazil. They live in a boarding school system, where they receive, besides lessons and instructions, uniform, meals and per diem. Students are divided into three companies (Eagle, Lion and Panther), and each of them has five platoons, totaling 15 platoons throughout the school.

The EsPCEx school year includes the academic period, the school recess and the school holidays (between the graduating ceremony and the beginning of the course the following year). The beginning and the closing of the academic period are formalized by military ceremonies. Students must obtain a grade of 5.0 in all subjects in order to graduate:

- Calculus I
- Physics
- History
- Military Instruction
  - Shooting,
  - Organization
  - Preparation and Usage of the Army Ground Force
- Military Physical Training I, II, III
- Spanish I
- English I
- Portuguese I
- Chemistry Applied to the Military Sciences
- Information Technology and Communications

There is also an exam that tests all the subjects studied through the year, and the student must be considered apt in terms of Military Discipline.

The student receives at graduation the School Certificate including all the subjects studied and the Certificate of Reservist of the 2nd Category. If the student doesn't get the necessary grade to finish the course he may do the final exams a second time. If he does not pass one or more subjects, he will have to return a second year, and study that the subject at EsPCEx in the following year as well as Military Instruction, Spanish, and English. That second year, the student must pass.

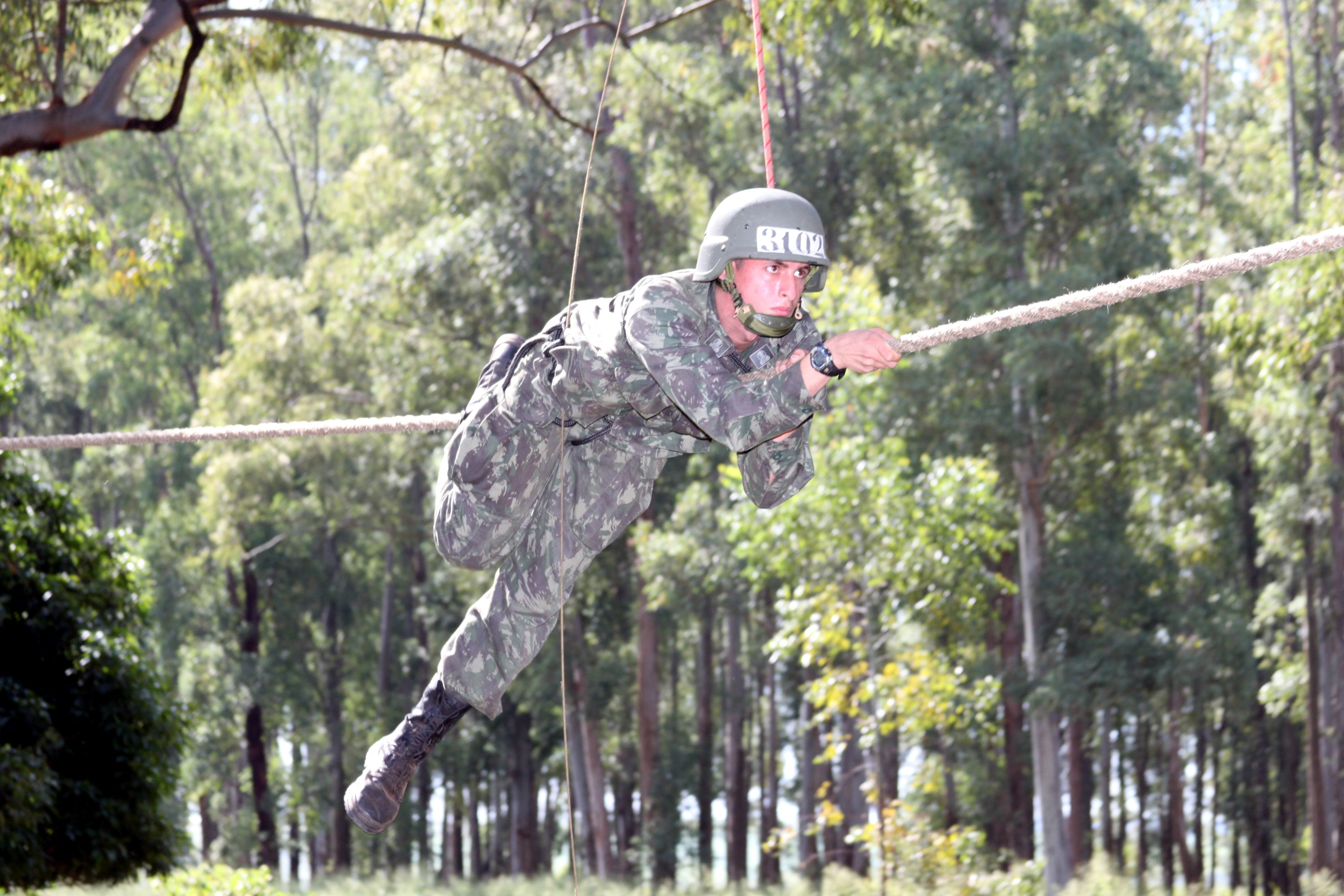
Professional military teaching

=== Problem solving ===
Since 2012, EsPCEx has adopted the Teaching through Competences methodology, the first military school in Brazil to implement this methodology. In this method, knowledge must be contextualized and integrate the syllabi of the different disciplines into problem-solving situations. With the use of this methodology, students have to reflect and solve problems in a systemic and integral way.

=== Health preparation and physical training (PT) ===
PT is aimed at the student's physical preparation and healthy conditions, to give a transition from the civilian (normally sedentary) life to a cadet's intense routine. The aim is not to form the combatant in physical terms in only one year at EsPCEx, but to form the basis for the student to be prepared at the Academy. Among the key activities are non-stop running, swimming and circuit training. . Competitive training atEsPCEx focuses mostly on building the basis for sports teams at AMAN.

== See also ==
- Brazilian Army
- Escola de Comando e Estado-Maior do Exército
- Academia Militar das Agulhas Negras
- List of Commanders of the Escola de Comando e Estado-Maior do Exército
- List of Commanders of the Academia Militar das Agulhas Negras
