= Enzo Martins Peri =

Brazilian Army general (born 1941)

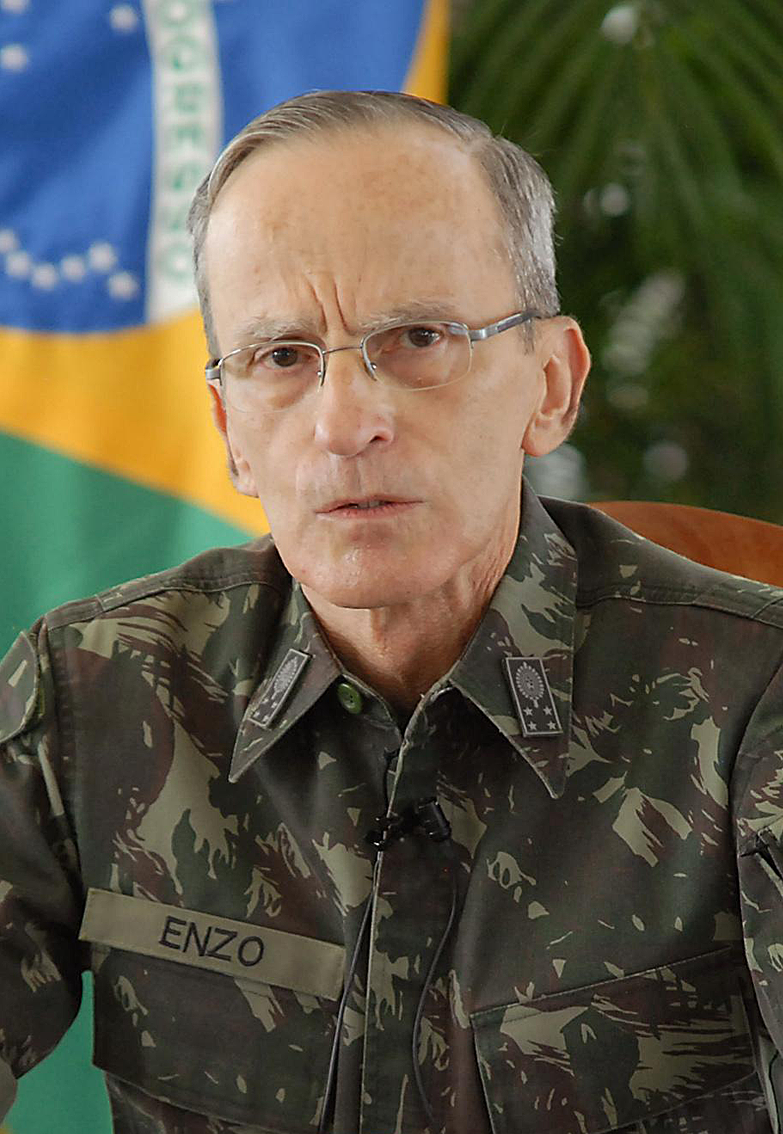
- Peri in 2012

Commander of the Brazilian Army
- In office 21 February 2007 – 7 January 2015
- Preceded by: Francisco de Albuquerque
- Succeeded by: Eduardo Villas Bôas

Personal details
- Born: April 11, 1941 (age 85) Rio de Janeiro, Brazil

Military service
- Allegiance: Brazil
- Branch/service: Brazilian Army
- Years of service: 1960-2015
- Rank: Army general

Enzo Martins Peri is a Brazilian Army general who was the commander of the Brazilian Army from 2007 to 2015.

== Early life and education ==
Peri was born in Rio de Janeiro on April 11, 1941, and begun his military career in February 1960, when he entered the Military Academy of Agulhas Negras. He graduated in 1962 and later made the course of Construction and Fortification in the Instituto Militar de Engenharia, the Advanced Course of Engineers in the Escola de Aperfeiçoamento de Oficiais (Brazilian Advanced School) and the General Staff Officer Course in the Escola de Comando e Estado-Maior do Exército (English: Brazilian Army Staff College).

== Career ==
Peri was an instructor at the Escola de Aperfeiçoamento de Oficiais and commanded the 9th Combat Engineering Company in Rio de Janeiro, served in the 1st Construction Engineer Brigade in João Pessoa, and in the Army Minister Cabinet in Brasília. He was also an instructor at the Brazilian Army Mission in Paraguay and commanded the 9th Construction Engineering Battalion Cuiabá. Later was Chief of Staff of the 2nd Construction Engineer Brigade and of the 12th Military Region, both situated in Manaus. Peri was previously a Cabinet Chief of the Army General Secretary in Brasília.

Promoted to General-de-Brigada (English: Major general) in March 1995, he was an Army General Secretary in Brasília, 2nd Construction Engineer Brigade commander in Manaus, 1st Construction Engineer Brigade commander in João Pessoa, and a Cooperation Engineering Works director in Brasília.

In March 1999, he ascended to General-de-Divisão (English: Lieutenant general). In this rank he was 2nd Military Region commander (São Paulo) and deputy chief of the Engineering and Constructions Department in Brasília.

In March 2003, Peri was promoted to General-de-Exército (English: General), the highest rank he has ever held. For four years Peri was chief of the Army Engineering and Constructions Department in Brasília. At the behest of the Brazilian government, he assumed command of the Brazilian Army from Francisco Roberto de Albuquerque in March 2007, during the second term of President Luiz Inácio Lula da Silva.

Military offices
Preceded by Francisco Roberto de Albuquerque	Commander of the Brazilian Army; March 2007 – 2015	Succeeded by Eduardo Villas Bôas
