= List of commanders of the Escola de Comando e Estado-Maior do Exército =

This is the list of commanders of the Escola de Comando e Estado-Maior do Exército (ECEME). Since 1905, ECEME has had 61 effective commanders. Among them, the most notable are the President Humberto de Alencar Castello Branco and ministers Nestor Sezefredo dos Passos, Henrique Teixeira Lott, Zenildo Gonzaga Zoroastro de Lucena, Ivan de Sousa Mendes and Sérgio Westphalen Etchegoyen.

== Escola de Estado-Maior (1905–1955) ==
Number	Name	Portrait	Begin	End
1	Major-General Miguel Maria Girard		January 26, 1906	October 1, 1907
2	Colonel Alfredo Cândido de Moraes Rêgo		October 8, 1907	October 3, 1910
3	Colonel Gabino Bezouro		October 3, 1910	April 20, 1914
4	Colonel Felinto Alcino Braga Cavalcante		April 20, 1914	August 11, 1916
5	Major-General Inácio de Alencastro Guimarães		August 11, 1916	January 14, 1918
6	Colonel Nestor Sezefredo dos Passos		March 15, 1920	February 9, 1921
7	Colonel Raymundo Pinto Seidl		February 16, 1921	May 1, 1923
8	Colonel Jonathas Borges Fortes		May 21, 1923	August 16, 1924
9	Colonel Augusto Limpo Teixeira de Freitas		August 19, 1924	November 17, 1926
10	Colonel Raymundo Rodrigues Barbosa		December 16, 1926	June 22, 1931
11	Colonel Christovão de Castro Barcellos		June 23, 1931	June 20, 1933
12	Colonel José Antonio Coelho Netto		June 20, 1933	October 4, 1934
13	Colonel Estevam Leitão de Carvalho		October 4, 1934	January 2, 1936
14	Colonel Isauro Reguera		January 2, 1936	January 10, 1938
15	Colonel Milton de Freitas Almeida		March 15, 1938	June 8, 1939
16	Colonel Renato Baptista Nunes		June 8, 1939	December 15, 1942
17	Colonel Henrique Baptista Duffles Teixeira Lott		December 23, 1942	July 12, 1943
18	Colonel Fernando de Sabóia Bandeira de Mello		July 12, 1943	April 12, 1945
19	Major-General Francisco Gil Castello Branco		July 5, 1945	June 8, 1946
20	Major-General Tristão de Alencar Araripe		June 8, 1946	May 3, 1949
21	Major-General José Daudt Fabrício		May 3, 1949	April 1, 1952
22	Major-General João Valdetaro de Amorim e Mello		April 1, 1952	September 5, 1952
23	Major-General Antonio José Coelho dos Reis		October 30, 1952	August 27, 1954

== Escola de Comando e Estado-Maior do Exército (1955–present) ==
Number	Name	Portrait	Begin	End
24	Major-General Humberto de Alencar Castello Branco		September 15, 1954	January 3, 1956
25	Major-General Emílio Maurell Filho		January 10, 1956	November 18, 1956
26	Major-General Hugo Panasco Alvim		February 28, 1958	January 19, 1960
27	Major-General Luiz Augusto da Silveira		January 19, 1960	September 4, 1961
28	Major-General Jurandyr de Bizarria Mamede		September 4, 1961	June 2, 1964
29	Major-General João Bina Machado		July 14, 1964	August 29, 1966
30	Lieutenant-General Reynaldo Mello de Almeida		November 18, 1966	May 7, 1969
31	Lieutenant-General Adolpho João de Paula Couto		May 7, 1969	February 12, 1970
32	Major-General Ariel Pacca da Fonseca		February 12, 1970	April 22, 1971
33	Major-General Roberto Alves de Carvalho Filho		April 22, 1971	February 10, 1972
34	Major-General Francisco de Mattos Junior		February 10, 1972	February 11, 1974
35	Major-General Alzir Benjamin Chaloub		February 11, 1974	January 30, 1976
36	Major-General Ivan de Souza Mendes		January 30, 1976	February 7, 1979
37	Lieutenant-General Diogo de Oliveira Figueiredo		February 7, 1979	February 2, 1982
38	Major-General Alberto dos Santos Lima Fajardo		February 2, 1982	January 28, 1983
39	Major-General Eduardo Cesar Lucena Barbosa		January 28, 1983	January 25, 1985
40	Major-General Zenildo Gonzaga Zoroastro de Lucena		January 25, 1985	January 27, 1987
41	Major-General Léo Ulysséa Lebarbenchon		January 27, 1987	December 18, 1987
42	Major-General Aricildes de Moraes Motta		December 18, 1987	April 20, 1990
43	Major-General Luciano Phaelante Casales		April 20, 1990	May 13, 1992
44	Major-General Sady Guilherme Schmidt		May 13, 1992	April 22, 1993
45	Major-General Reynaldo Paim Sampaio		April 22, 1993	January 25, 1995
46	Major-General Luiz Edmundo Montedônio Rêgo		January 25, 1995	February 5, 1998
47	Lieutenant-General Ricardo Barbalho Lamellas		February 5, 1998	January 28, 2000
48	Lieutenant-General Paulo Cesar de Castro		January 28, 2000	May 9, 2002
49	Major-General Lúcio Mário de Barros Góes		May 9, 2002	May 24, 2004
50	Major-General Luiz Eduardo Rocha Paiva		May 24, 2004	December 13, 2006
51	Lieutenant-General Sergio Westphalen Etchegoyen		December 13, 2006	April 6, 2009
52	Lieutenant-General João Camilo Pires de Campos		April 6, 2009	April 6, 2011
53	Major-General Sergio José Pereira		April 6, 2011	December 14, 2012
54	Major-General Walter Nilton Pina Stoffel		December 14, 2012	February 5, 2015
55	Lieutenant-General Elias Rodrigues Martins Filho		February 5, 2015	September 23, 2016
56	Major-General Richard Fernandez Nunes		September 23, 2016	March 16, 2018
57	Lieutenant-General Edson Diehl Ripoli		March 16, 2018	February 12, 2019
58	Major-General Rodrigo Pereira Vergara		February 12, 2019	September 9, 2020
59	Major-General Márcio de Souza Nunes Ribeiro		September 9, 2020	April 18, 2022
60	Major-General Sergio Manoel Martins Pereira Junior		April 18, 2022	December 14, 2023
61	Major-General Mario Eduardo Moura Sassone		December 14, 2023	-

== See also ==
- Brazilian Army
- Escola de Comando e Estado-Maior do Exército
- Academia Militar das Agulhas Negras
- List of Commanders of the Academia Militar das Agulhas Negras
- Preparatory School of the Brazilian Army (Escola Preparatória de Cadetes do Exército)
