= Carlos de Meira Mattos =

Brazilian general (1913–2007)

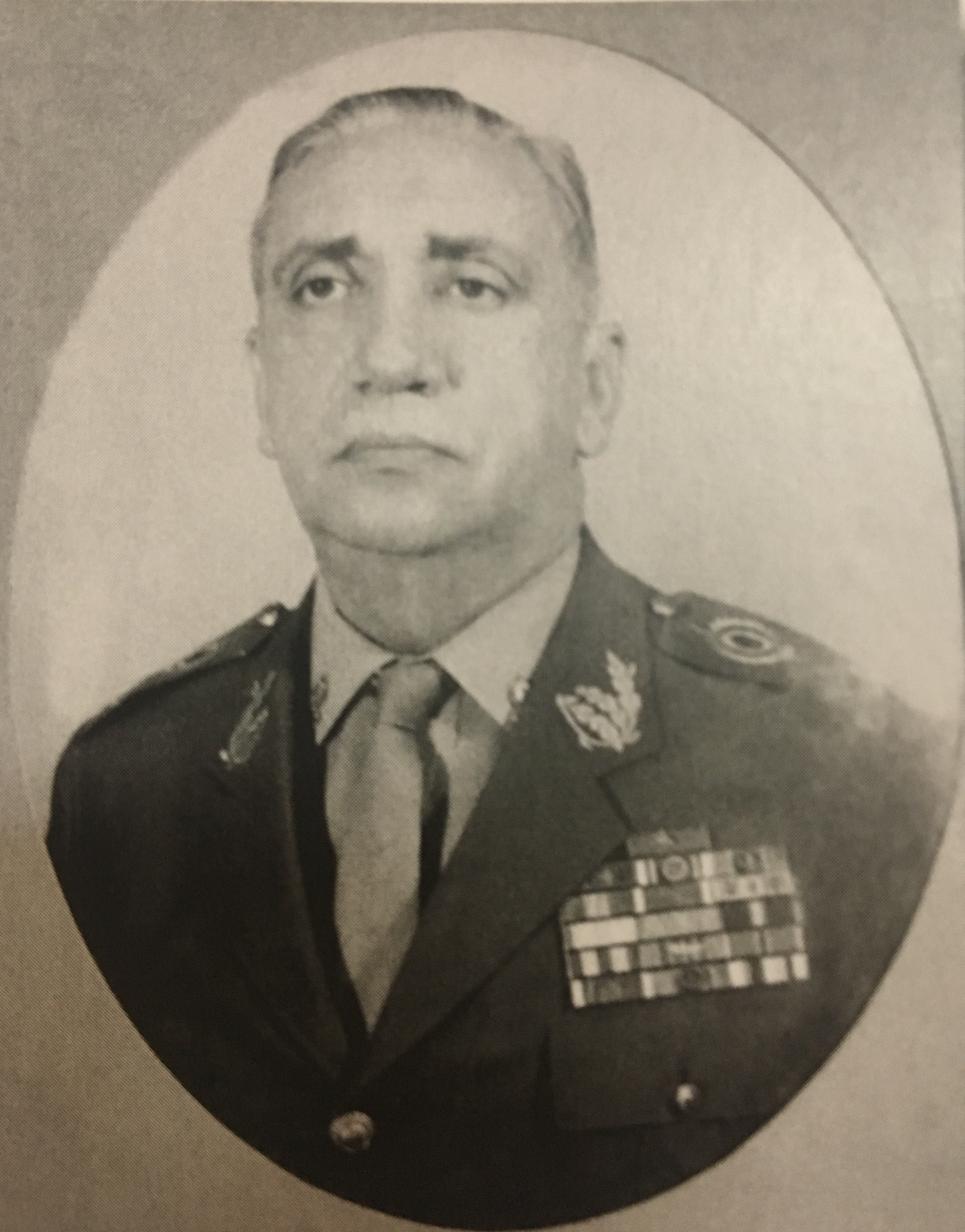
- Born: July 23, 1913; São Carlos, São Paulo, Brazil
- Died: January 26, 2007 (aged 93) São Paulo, São Paulo, Brazil
- Allegiance: Brazil
- Branch: Brazilian Army
- Service years: 1933 - 1977
- Rank: Divisional general
- Conflicts: Italian campaign: Battle of Monte Castello
- Education: Military School of Realengo

Carlos de Meira Mattos (July 23, 1913 – January 26, 2007) was a Brazilian divisional general and military historian. He was one of the principal formulators and theorists of Brazilian geopolitical strategy during the military dictatorship.

== Biography ==
Born in São Carlos, Mattos volunteered to fight in the Constitutionalist Revolution on the side of the paulistas. In 1933, he enrolled at the old Military School of Realengo, completing his training in 1936.

As a captain, he helped the general Mascarenhas de Morais organize the Brazilian Expeditionary Force as part of the Allied forces in World War II. In the Italian campaign, he served as a liaison officer between the US IV Corps, commanded by Willis D. Crittenberger, and the Brazilian division. Mattos commanded a company in the Battle of Monte Castello.

From 1950 to 1952, he served as director of the course of infantry at the Military Academy of Agulhas Negras. Mattos took active part in the conspiracy that would lead to the 1964 coup d'état, during which he mobilized his unit, dislocating it from Cuiabá to Brasília, to support the rebelled officers. In November of that same year, he was appointed federal interventor of the state of Goiás.

In 1965, Mattos commanded the Brazilian expedition in the IAPF intervention in the Dominican Republic. In the early hours of October 20 of that same year, Mattos led the invasion of the National Congress by federal troops, signalizing the provisory suspension of its activities.

In 1967, he attended the Escola Superior de Guerra (pt). In December, he was invited by president Humberto de Alencar Castello Branco to chair a commission assigned with formulating repressive measures against the increasingly combative student movement, as well as with proposing reforms to higher education.

In 1969, he was promoted to general and appointed director of the Military Academy of Agulhas Negras. As his military career drew closer to its end, he began dedicating himself to academic activity, teaching at several institutions, including the Brazilian Air Force Academy and the Escola de Guerra Naval (pt).

== Works ==
- Brasil: Geopolítica e Destino (1975)
- A Geopolítica e as Projeções do Poder (1977)
- Uma Geopolítica Pan-Amazônica (1980)
- O Marechal Mascarenhas de Morais e sua Época (1983)
- Geopolítica e Trópicos (1984)
- Geopolítica e Teoria de Fronteiras (1990)
- Castello Branco e a Revolução (2000)
- Geopolítica e Modernidade (2002)
