= Escola de Comando e Estado-Maior do Exército =

Military college in Brazil

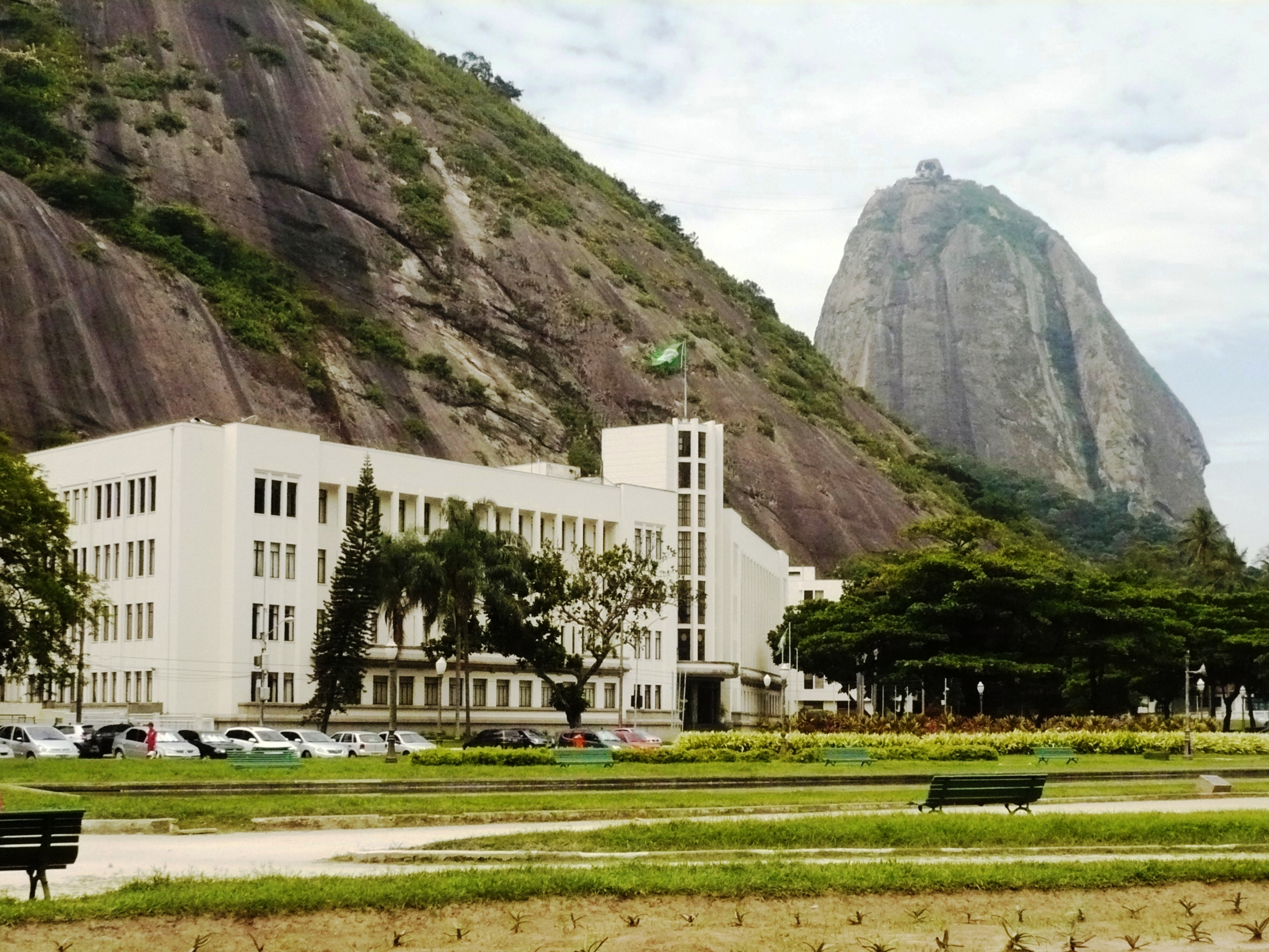
- Other names: ECEME
- Type: Military Staff College
- Established: 1905
- Parent institution: Brazilian Army
- Commander: Major General Carlos Alberto Moutinho Vaz
- Location: Rio de Janeiro, Rio de Janeiro, Brazil
- Website: www.eceme.eb.mil.br

The Escola de Comando e Estado-Maior do Exército - ECEME (Brazilian Army Command and General Staff School) - Escola Marechal Castello Branco – is in the Urca neighborhood, in the city of Rio de Janeiro, Brazil.

It is an educational unit of the Brazilian Army, with the mission to prepare senior officers for general staff functions, command, leadership, direction and advising. In addition, it cooperates with the general and sectoral direction Army bodies developing doctrine for Army preparation and employment.

It is directly in subordination to the Diretoria de Ensino Superior Militar – DESMil (Higher Military Education Directorate), of the Departamento de Educação e Cultura – DECEX (Army Department of Education and Culture).

== History ==
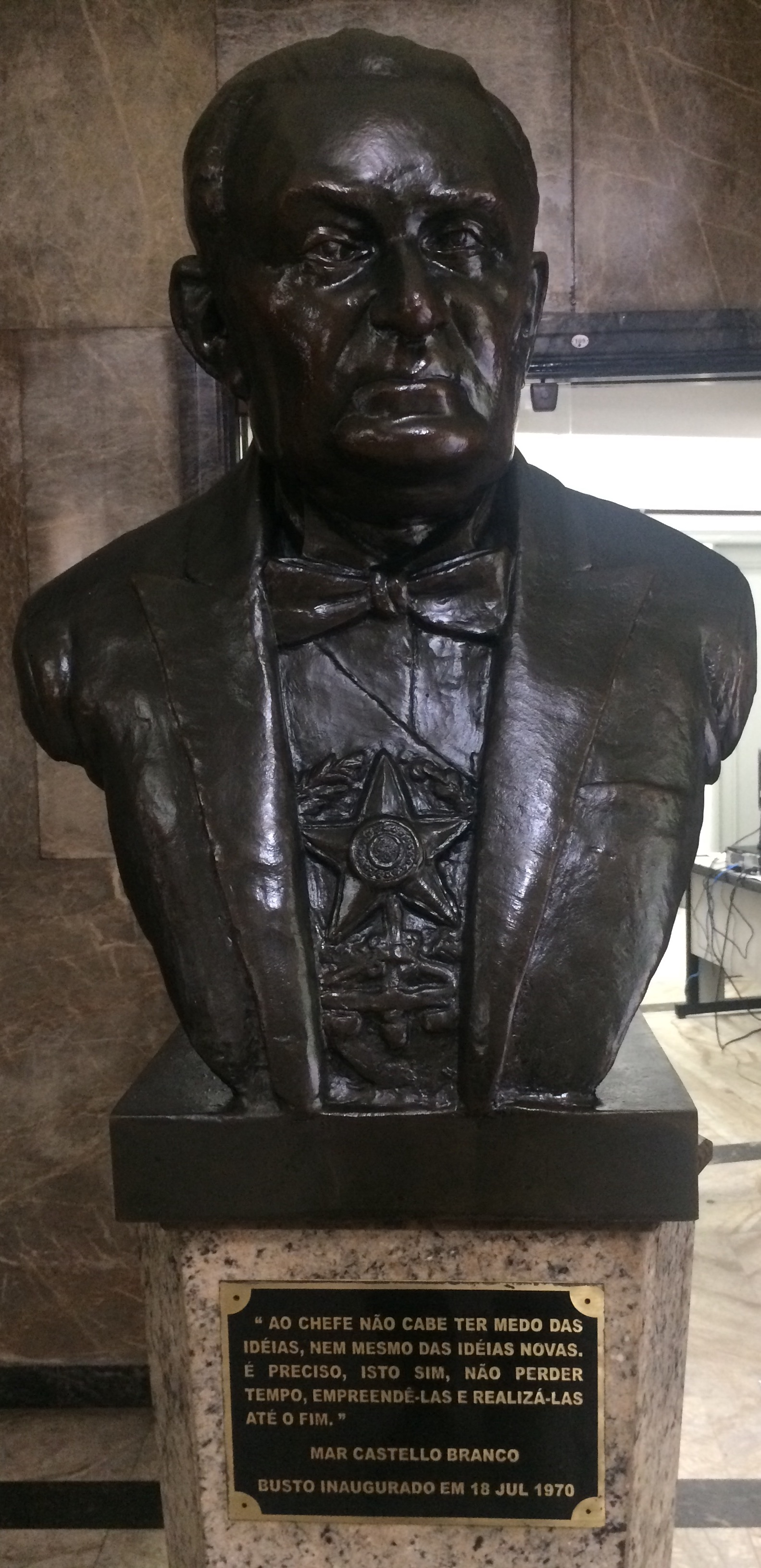
Bust of marshal Castelo Branco, at the ECEME entrance

At the time of the transfer of the Portuguese court to Brazil (1808-1821), the Headquarters of the Court was established in Rio de Janeiro, which guided and coordinated the activities of the Portuguese Army.

Later, at the beginning of the twentieth century, the implementation Decree of October 2, 1905, established the General Staff School. With its implantation, strategic, tactical and logistic teachings, indispensable for the preparation and the employment of the modern Army, were given regularly to the field grade officers of the Brazilian Army.

At the end of the World War I (1918), the Brazilian government brought instructors specialized in subjects related to the art of war from France. The elements of the so-called French Military Mission, which lasted until 1940), provided an update to the officers of the Military Staff College, both in terms of modern combat processes and publications on weapons tactics, campaign services and military leadership.

The participation of the Brazilian Expeditionary Force in the Second World War brought profound changes in doctrine, curriculum, teaching and work methods, as well as in the environment of the Army General Staff School. The return of the last three members of the French military mission, and the military agreements with the Americans, were a decisive contribution to these changes. Thus, from 1940, a new stage was established in the trajectory of the School, marked by its definitive installation in the present building at Praia Vermelha (Red Beach).

On January 26, 1967, the School was made an Honorary Member of the Portuguese Military Order of Aviz.

Among its 57 commanders, there are many notable figures such as President Humberto de Alencar Castelo Branco and the Ministers Nestor Sezefredo dos Passos, Henrique Teixeira Lott, Zenildo Gonzaga Zoroastro de Lucena, Ivan de Sousa Mendes and Sérgio Westphalen Etchegoyen.

== Presentation ==
Aligned with the Army General Staff guidelines, the School implemented modernization and management improvement projects. At the same time, through specific projects, it preserved historical objects and collections, as well as the memory of previous commanders who entrusted ECEME with personal objects.

The School adopts diverse curriculum and disciplines corresponding to the offered courses, using the Teaching by Competences Methodology. It seeks curriculum which continuously is updated and that is reviewed periodically with the use of a methodology substantiated on scientific basis, specially developed for the Brazilian Army education system.

The school evaluation system has been continually improved, considering students’ performance in school activities, especially in group work and in the results of formal tests.

The School emphasizes integration and group work in its activities, adopts a reading program to stimulate the reading and to extend the culture of the officers and develops a broad external relation with educational entities, civil and military, seeking the cooperation in many areas of education.

The School has a modern cultural space, the library, which brings together a reception hall and an exhibit. The library has a large collection of materials for consultation, besides being linked to other libraries in the country and abroad, it specializes in military science.

In addition to reading selected books and stimulating self-improvement, the School offers its students visits to historical sites such as the Santa Cruz Fortress, the Imbuhy and Rio Branco Forts, the Army Historical Museum, the National Historical Museum, the Museum of WWII Casualties and exhibitions of cultural interest.

Physical training is fundamental for good school performance. Military physical training is included in the discipline plan and supported by the Centro de Capacitação Física do Exército – CCEFEx (Army Physical Training Center).

== Admissions ==
According to the Admission and Enrollment Regulation Instructions (IRCAM), the selection process for Higher Military Studies Courses (CAEM) is executed in three subprocesses: registration, institutional selection and intellectual selection.

After the registration deferment, the institutional selection is carried out by the Permanent Committee of Inquiry of the Diretoria de Avaliação e Promoções – DAPROM (Army Evaluation and Promotion Department). The third subprocess, the intellectual selection, is carried out by discursive tests. The admissions competition, for the combatant and military engineers officers, is composed of 02 (two) tests, which cover the subjects of geography and history. Medical officers only perform the geography test. All applicants must already be qualified in one foreign language.

The competition selects the future leaders of the Army and due to the functions they will perform, they will require cognitive and affective capacities, which can be summarized as follows:

1. Intellectual and cultural background, necessary for the future staff officer and high-level advisor of the force;

2. Interdisciplinary knowledge of history and geography, necessary for the continuity of the institution of permanent character "Brazilian Army", in a nation with the dimensions and projection as Brazil; and

3. Ability to solve problems in a synthetic, clear, objective and coherent way, with reduced availability of time.

== Courses ==
All School courses are post-graduate courses and are in accordance with the legislation that regulates college education in the country and as prescribed in the Army Education Law Regulation. They are:

- Policy, Strategy and Senior Management of the Army Course (CPEAEx);
- International Course of Strategic Studies (CIEE);
- Military High Studies Courses (CAEM): Command and General Staff Course (CCEM); Direction Course for Military Engineers (CDEM); Direction and General Staff Course for Medical Officials (CCEM/Med) and Command and General Staff Course for Friendly Nations Officers (CCEM/ONA);
- Preparatory Course for Military High Studies Courses (CP/CAEM); and
- Research and Postgraduate Studies in Military Sciences stricto sensu (PPGCM-SS).

=== Policy, Strategy and Senior Management of the Army Course (CPEAEx) ===
For colonels selected by merit, with the duration of one year and with vacancies for officers of the Navy and Air Force. The general objective of this course is to enable and train officers to advise the highest levels of the Military Forces.

=== Military High Studies Courses (CAEM) ===
The four courses of Military High Studies are divided as follows:

==== Command and General Staff Course (CCEM) ====
Its purpose is to enable and train combatant officers of the Armed Forces, to exercise staff duties of Brigades and higher command, as well as to prepare future commanders and the combatant generals of the Army. The duration of the course is two years and is attended by majors and lieutenant colonels.

==== Direction and General Staff Course for Medical Officials (CCEM/Med) ====
The objectives are to enable medical officers to hold positions and general staff functions related to the Health Service, as well as to prepare future directors and the medical generals of the Army. The duration of the course is one year and is attended by majors and lieutenant colonels.

==== Direction Course for Military Engineers (CDEM) ====
Aiming to provide the military engineer officers with essential knowledge to advise in activities related to Industrial Mobilization, as well as to prepare future commanders and the military engineer generals of the Army. The course is attended by majors and lieutenant-colonels and lasts one year.

==== Command and General Staff Course for Friendly Nations Officers (CCEM/ONA) ====
Its purpose is to enable these officers to perform general staff functions and to strengthen ties of friendship with the represented countries. The duration of the course is one year.

=== Preparatory Course for Military High Studies Courses (CP/CAEM) ===
The Course lasts approximately 12 months. It is carried out in a distance learning mode. The objectives are:

1. To train officers to participate in the selection processes for ECEME courses, on an equal basis, regardless of the garrison where they are deployed;

2. Provide cultural background for the officer's good performance in the School courses; and

3. To increase the general knowledge of Army officers, utilizing history and geography and using as instrumental disciplines the Military History, Geopolitics and Strategy, Written Expression and the School Solution Question Method. These disciplines are considered essential for the senior officer and future commander.

=== Research and Postgraduate Studies in Military Sciences stricto sensu (PPGCM-SS) ===
Since 2001, the School has been conducting Research and Postgraduate Studies in Military Program at the Lato Sensu (Specialization) and Stricto Sensu (Master's) levels and, since 2005, the Stricto Sensu (Doctorate), all in Military Sciences. Stricto Sensu is accredited by the Federal Education Department, both master's and doctorate, and is intended for military and civilians, national or foreign, with the purpose of graduating highly qualified professionals.

The programs are organized in a concentration area and their respective lines of research, which comprise the subjects of Brazilian Army interest, as well as topics of interest in the area of national defense, as specified below:

| CONCENTRATION AREA | LINES OF RESEARCH | SUBJECTS | |
|---|---|---|---|
| NATIONAL DEFENSE | Defense Management | 1. Management | of Military Units; Budgetary and Financial; of Health; of Science and Technology |
| NATIONAL DEFENSE | Defense Management | 2.Public Management: 3. Military Leadership and Strategy; 4. Processes Management; 5. Projects Management; 6. Logistic and Mobilization | |
| NATIONAL DEFENSE | War and Peace Studies | 1. Military Doctrine | Army Training and Employment; Operational Systems; Joint Operations |
| NATIONAL DEFENSE | War and Peace Studies | 2. Security and Defense; 3. Geopolitics and Strategy; 4. Prospective Studies; 5. International Relations; 6. Organizational and Military History | |

== Chronology ==
- 1905 - Creation of the Military General Staff School (EEM), subordinate to the Army General Staff (EME).
- 1906 - Start of operation in the old building of the Department of War.
- 1907 - Provisional installation at the Military School of Brazil which is no longer in existence, at Praia Vermelha (Red Beach).
- 1909 - Graduation of the first class; increase of the course to three years and inclusion of the teaching of strategy and military history.
- 1916 - Beginning of civil and military authorities participation as lecturers in the School.
- 1918 - Temporary suspension of school activities due to the First World War.
- 1920 - Restart of activities in the northern part of the former Department of War; beginning of the orientation of the French Military Mission.
- 1921 - Installation in the building occupied by the First Military Police Battalion, located on Barão de Mesquita street.
- 1940 - Definitive installation in the current building of Praia Vermelha (Red Beach), coinciding with the end of the French Military Mission.
- 1947 - Creation of the Quartermaster General Staff Course.
- 1955 - Change of denomination to Army Command and General Staff School (ECEME).
- 1964 - Introduction of "teaching areas" in the School curriculum.
- 1965 - Reorganization of the School to meet the new teaching system and creation of the School Preparatory Course.
- 1968 - Replacement of teaching areas with teaching sections.
- 1969 – School subordination change from the General Staff of the Army to the Formation and Improvement Army Department (DFA), an Education and Research Department (DEP) of the Ministry of the Army.
- 1977 - Start of the Army General Staff Course with a duration of two years; and graduation of the first class of the Direction Course for Military Engineers (CDEM).
- 1986 – Creation of the Policy, Strategy and Senior Management of the Army Course (CPEAEx).
- 1988 – Graduation of the first CPEAEx class.
- 1996 - Beginning of the School restructuring to adapt to the modernization of the Army Education System.
- 2001 - Implementation of the School Postgraduate Program.
- 2005 - Commemoration of the School Centenary and School Historic denomination: Marechal Castello Branco.
- 2006 – Creation of the Management and Advisory Staff Course (CGAEM).
- 2012 – Creation of the Institute Meira Mattos;
- 2015 – Recognition of the Research and Postgraduate Studies in Military Program (Masters) by the Federal Education Department;
- 2016 – Implementation of Teaching by Competences Methodology and School restructuring to adapt to this kind of teaching; Recognition of the Research and Postgraduate Studies in Military Program (doctorate) by the Federal Education Department.
- 2017 – Transfer of the Management and Advisory Staff Course (CGAEM) to the Escola de Formação Complementar do Exército - EsFCEx (Complementary Formation Army School).

== See also ==
- Brazilian Army
- List of Commanders of the Escola de Comando e Estado-Maior do Exército
- Academia Militar das Agulhas Negras
- List of Commanders of the Academia Militar das Agulhas Negras
- Escola Preparatória de Cadetes do Exército
- United States Army Command and General Staff College - the United States Army equivalent
