= Military Academy of Agulhas Negras =

Military Higher Education School of the Brazilian Army

Coordinates: 22°37′13″S 44°26′58″W

- Academia Militar das Agulhas Negras
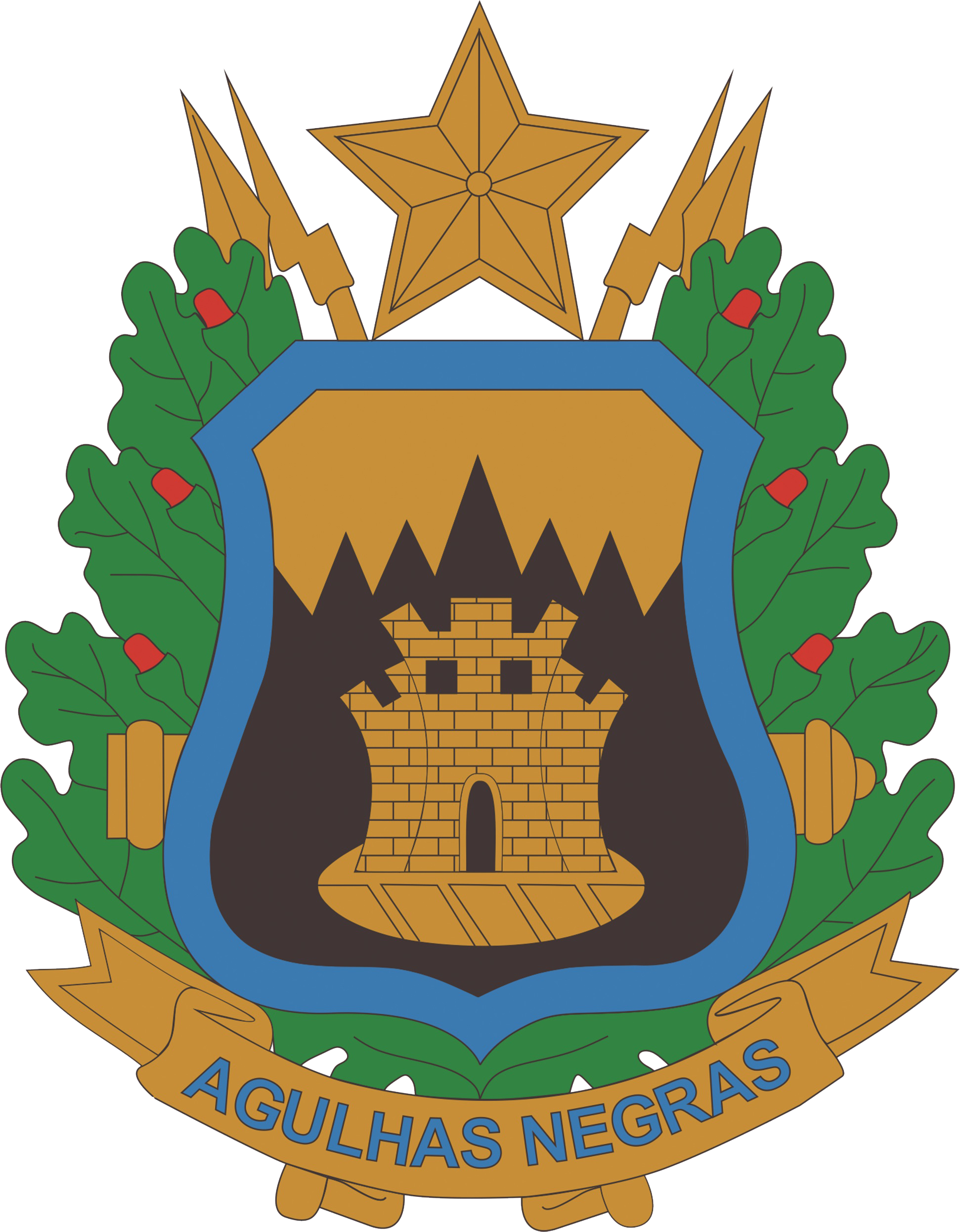
- Type: Military academy
- Established: 1792/1811 (new campus in 1944)
- Affiliations: Brazilian Army
- Commander: Major General Marcus Vinicius Gomes Bonifacio
- Location: Resende, Rio de Janeiro, Brazil
- Website: www.aman.eb.mil.br

The Military Academy of Agulhas Negras (Portuguese: Academia Militar das Agulhas Negras, AMAN) is a service academy for training of officer cadets of the Brazilian Army. It originated in 1792 with the creation of the Royal Academy of Artillery, Fortification and Drawing, the first military school of the Americas. It is located in Resende, in the state of Rio de Janeiro.

It is the only institution that trains career officers in the Infantry, Cavalry, Artillery, Engineering and Communications branches, as well as the Ordnance Corps and the Army Quartermaster Corps.

== History ==
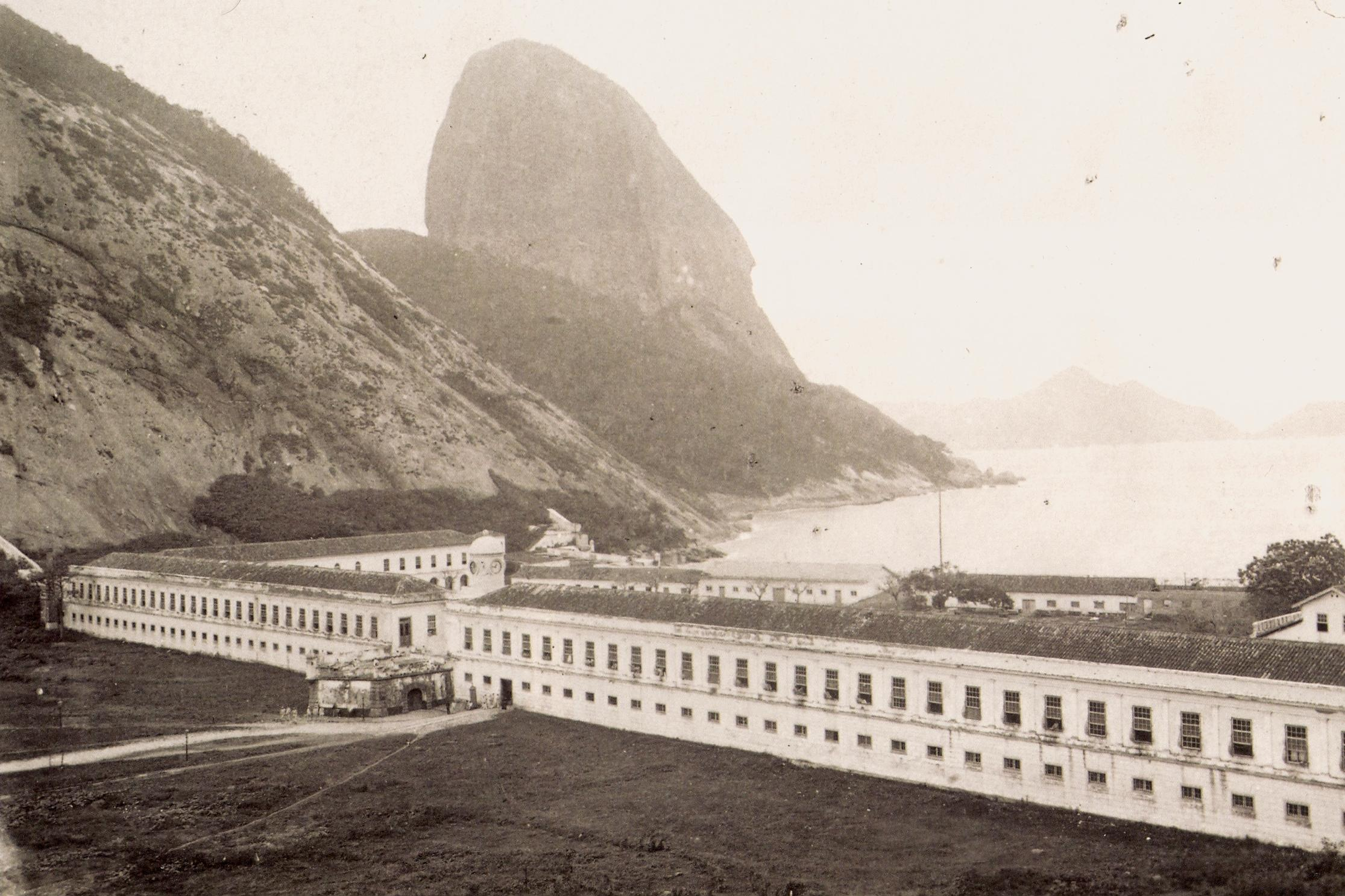
Military Academy in Rio de Janeiro, 1888.

The embryo of military education in the Brazilian colony was born in 1699, in Rio de Janeiro, with the prospects of forming portuguese (and their children) men able to build forts for the defense of the Brazilian coast, against incursions from english, dutch and french corsairs. In 1792, Queen Mary I of Portugal and Brazil founded the Real Academia de Artilharia, Fortificação e Desenho (Royal Academy of Artillery, Fortification and Drawing) in Rio de Janeiro, modeled after the existing Academy in Lisbon, intended to train officers of the Armas (infantry, cavalry and artillery), and engineering officers of the Portuguese Army in Brazil. Infantry and cavalry formation lasted 3 years, artillery lasted 5 and the engineering course lasted 6 years. In their last year, the engineer students specialized in civil architecture, construction materials, roads and path, hydraulics, bridges, canals, dams or floodgates. This Academy is considered the pioneer of military and engineering education in the Americas. The Royal Academy was based in the Casa do Trem, which used to be occupied by the National Historical Museum of Brazil.

The transfer of the Portuguese Royal Court from Lisbon to Rio de Janeiro in 1808 after they fled from Napoleon's invasion of Portugal caused King Dom João VI to inaugurate on 23 April 1811 the Royal Military Academy of Rio de Janeiro (Real Academia Militar), incorporating the previous Royal Academy of Artillery, Fortification and Drawing. Its first location was at the Artillery academy, today the location of the National Historical Museum of Brazil. In 1812, it was transferred to the São Francisco square, a place that offered better conditions for warfare maneuvers. With the Independence of Brazil in 1822, it was renamed the Imperial Academia Militar (Imperial Military Academy).

With the ever-growing need to improve the training of the officers of the Brazilian Army, it was merged with the School of War in Porto Alegre, Rio Grande Do Sul. In 1913, with the objective of uniting all the military institutes of War and Application, was created the Military Academy.

Given the urgent need to expand the facilities to serve a growing and fully operational Army, the Military School of Resende was created in the city of Resende on January 1, 1944. It was renamed the Academia Militar das Agulhas Negras in 1951.

The first female cadets of the Academy entered its doors in 2017.

== AMAN today ==
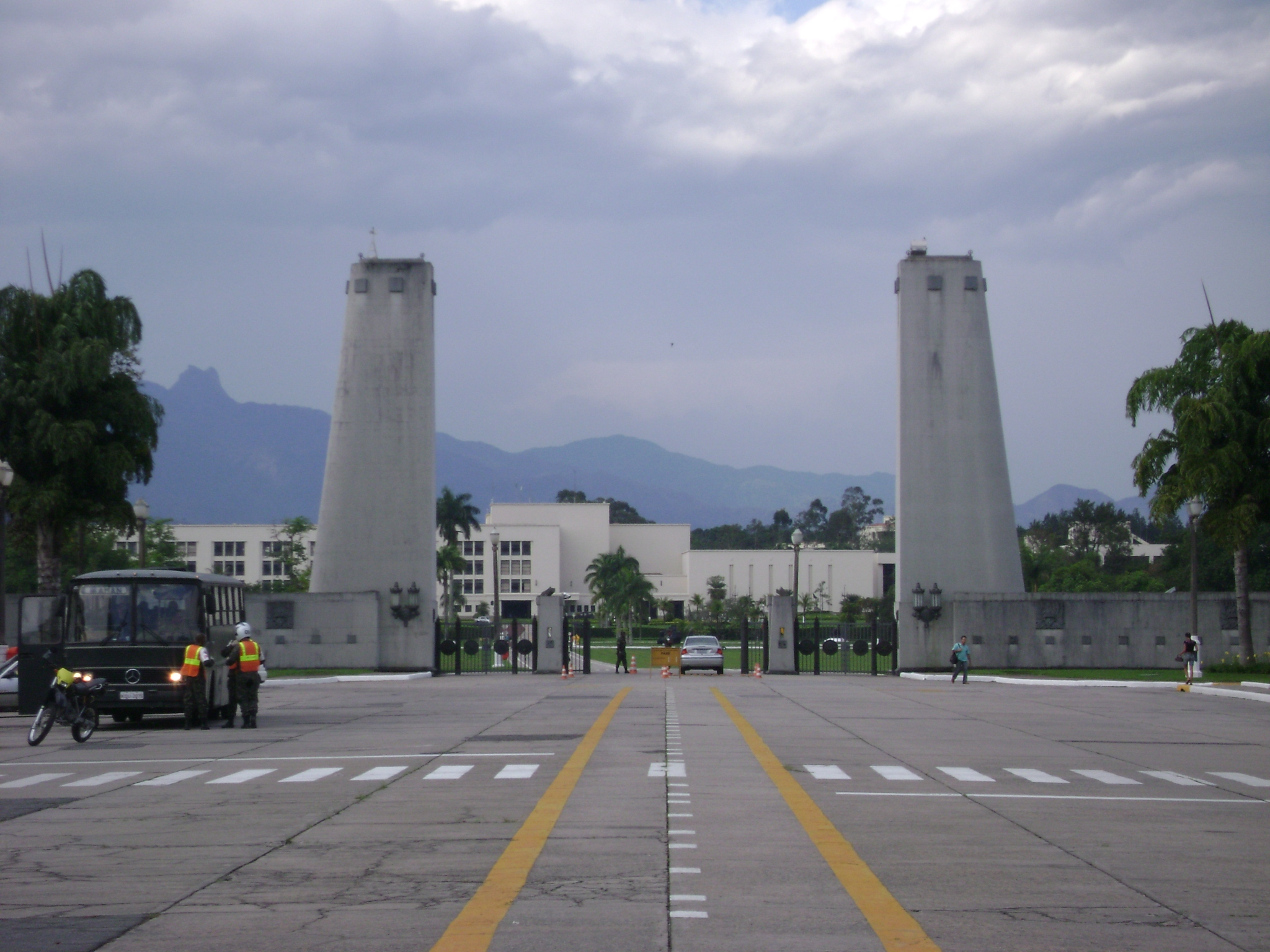
AMAN gates.

The AMAN campus in Resende occupies 67 km^{2}. It contains several complexes, including the Main Complex, the Physical Education Department, the Equestrian Department, the Firearms Department and the Instruction Park. The Main Complex was expanded in 1988 to two times its original size, the expansion consisting mainly of refectories and cadets' lodgings. The Command and Services Battalion includes the Headquarters Company, a Service Company, a Military Police Company, a Guard Company, a Rifleman Company, and two Corps of Cadets Auxiliary Companies. It is the largest Battalion of the Brazilian Army.

== Structure ==
The Cadet corps are constituted by a Commander, a Deputy Commander, a staff and diverse Courses and peculiar Sections, composites for Officers and Cadets with the diverse missions and characteristics. Specialties include infantry, cavalry, artillery, combat engineering, communications, quartermaster, and ordnance.

Cadets receive training in riding, weaponry, and physical fitness.

== Educational curriculum ==
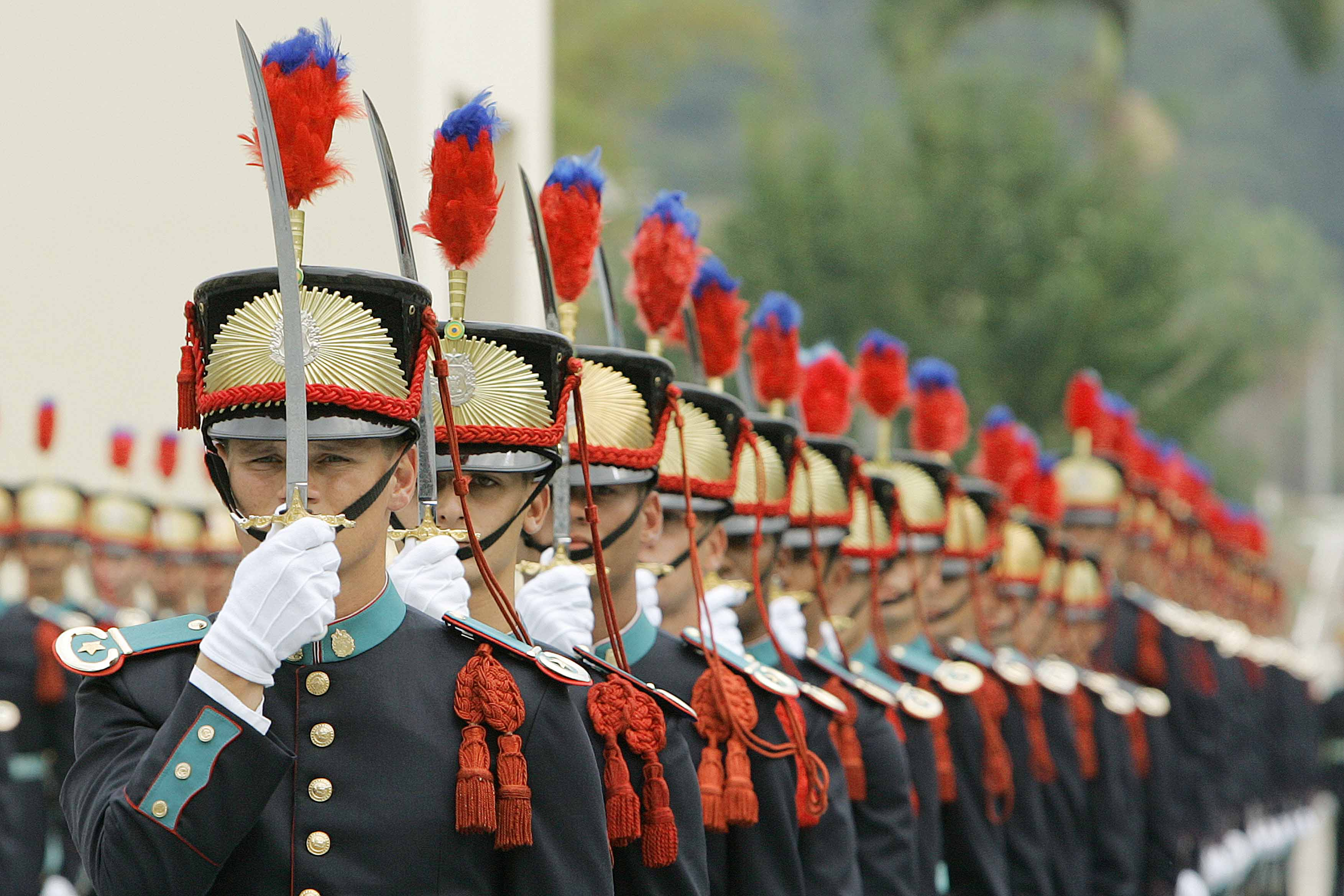
AMAN Cadets during the Espadim ("small sword") ceremony.

Just like so many military academies in the world, the AMAN is a medium-sized, highly residential baccalaureate college, with a full-time, four-year undergraduate program that emphasizes instruction in the arts, sciences, and professions with no graduate program, preparing men and women to take on the challenge of being officers of the Brazilian Army.

A cadet's career begins at the Preparatory School of the Brazilian Army (Escola Preparatória de Cadetes do Exército), where they complete an initial year of military studies. Later, they should attend the Academy where another year of basic formation training takes place. The next period, qualification, lasts from the second to the fourth year.

In the first period, the cadet's personality is adjusted to military life and combat. The cadet undergoes physical qualification and training in various abilities. During the second period, the cadet practices command, continues with physical training and develops to meet the positions and functions of subordinate officer and captain.

Other activities include maneuvers, the Academic Olympics, sporting competitions against the Naval School and the Academy of the Air Force (NAVAMAER) and the South American Festival of Cadets.

=== Undergraduate program – academic ===
The academic program consists of a structured core of subjects depending on the cadet's chosen specialty as a future Army officer, balanced between the arts and sciences. In the first year the cadets receive common education in various subjects and from the second year onward studies depend on the specialty branch he or she will be posted after graduation. Regardless of major, all cadets graduate with a Bachelor of Military Science degree.

=== Undergraduate program – military ===
As all cadets are commissioned as aspirants upon graduation, military and leadership education is nested with academic instruction. Military training and discipline fall under the purview of the Office of the Commandant of Cadets. After the preparatory period in the EsPCEx, the New Cadets join the ranks of the Corps in February every year. Each New Cadet receives strict military training as part of his/her first year in the academy, including physical training and arms training. They are recognized as full cadets in a ceremony in August where they receive ceremonial daggers, similar to those used by the Duke of Caixas, whilst wearing the blue dress uniform of the Corps. During the summer, the fourth class cadets spend their vacations in the specialty branch school of their choice, beginning the second year as full fledged third class cadets of their chosen service branches within the Army:

- Infantry Branch
- Armored Cavalry
- Field and Air Defense Artillery
- Corps of Engineers
- Signal Corps
- Logistics
- Materiel

In addition to the tough physical training regime and weapons training, each of the cadets are trained to endure the tough environments of the country in the performance of defense and security operations, as well as in assisting law enforcement and in peacekeeping duties abroad. During the Brazilian spring, all cadets go towards one year-end training exercise to assess their skills and apply the lessons learned during their studies.

== Cadet Ranks ==
Among the Cadets, 1st year cadets are called "primeiro-ano" (first-year) or "bicho" (animal), the 2nd years are called "calouro"(freshman), 3rd years "afim" and the 4th year cadet is already addressed as "aspirante" (officer candidate). These are informal denominations for the Cadets, seldom used by the officers.

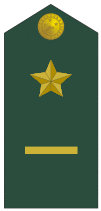
1st Year Cadet Rank

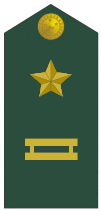
2nd Year Cadet Rank

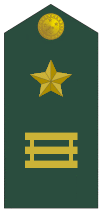
3rd Year Cadet Rank

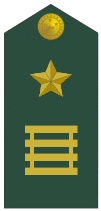
4th Year Cadet Rank

== Notable alumni ==
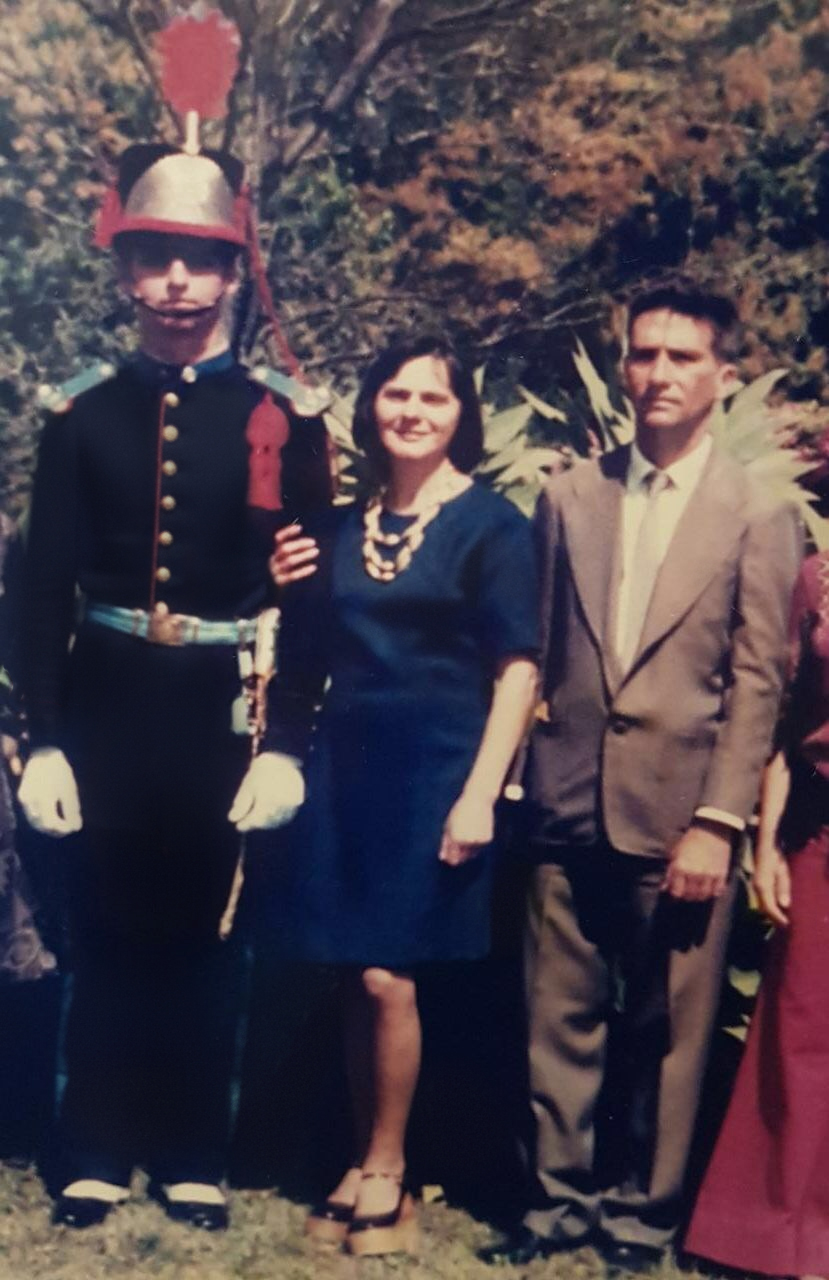
Jair Bolsonaro with his parents, Olinda and Geraldo Bolsonaro at the AMAN in 1974.

Alumni from the Military Academy in Rio de Janeiro, both in the old campus (Rio de Janeiro) and new campus (Resende, Rio de Janeiro state):

- Luís Alves de Lima e Silva, Duke of Caxias – Official patron of the Army and Prime Minister of Brazil.
- José Paranhos, Viscount of Rio Branco – Prime Minister of Brazil.
- Alfredo d'Escragnolle Taunay, Viscount of Taunay – Brazilian aristocrat, military officer and writer.
- Deodoro da Fonseca – Marshal and President of Brazil.
- Floriano Peixoto – Marshal and President of Brazil.
- Hermes Rodrigues da Fonseca – Marshal and President of Brazil.
- Eurico Gaspar Dutra – Marshal, Minister of War during World War II and President of Brazil.
- Humberto de Alencar Castelo Branco – Marshal and President of Brazil.
- Artur da Costa e Silva – Marshal and President of Brazil.
- Emílio Garrastazu Médici – General and President of Brazil.
- Ernesto Geisel – General and President of Brazil.
- João Baptista de Oliveira Figueiredo – President of Brazil, previous chief of the National Intelligence Service of Brazil.
- Golbery do Couto e Silva – General and founder of the National Intelligence Service of Brazil (SNI).
- Enzo Martins Peri – General of the Army, former Brazilian Army commander.
- Eduardo Dias da Costa Villas Bôas – General of the Army, Brazilian Army commander.
- Alacid Nunes – Governor of Pará (1966–1971, 1979–1983).
- Arolde de Oliveira – Senator for Rio de Janeiro (2019–2020).
- Antônio Hamilton Martins Mourão – General of the Army, former Commander of the Southern Military Command, Vice President of Brazil.
- Jair Messias Bolsonaro – President of Brazil (2019-2023).

== Gallery ==
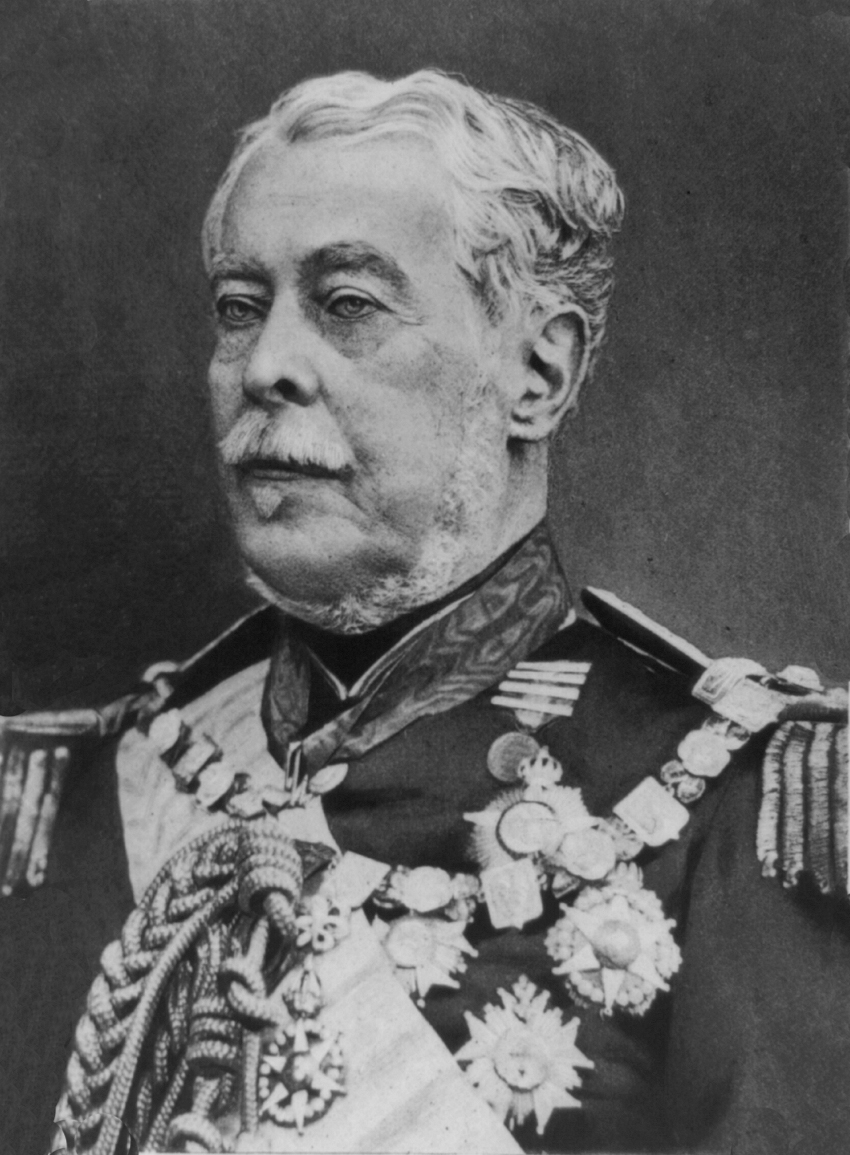
The Duke of Caxias. AMAN cadets swear the following oath: "I receive the saber of Caxias as the symbol of military honor itself."

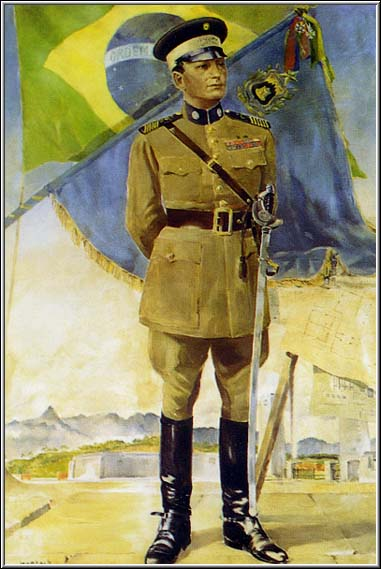
Marshal José Pessoa, nephew of president Epitácio Pessoa. He was responsible for the modern campus in 1944.

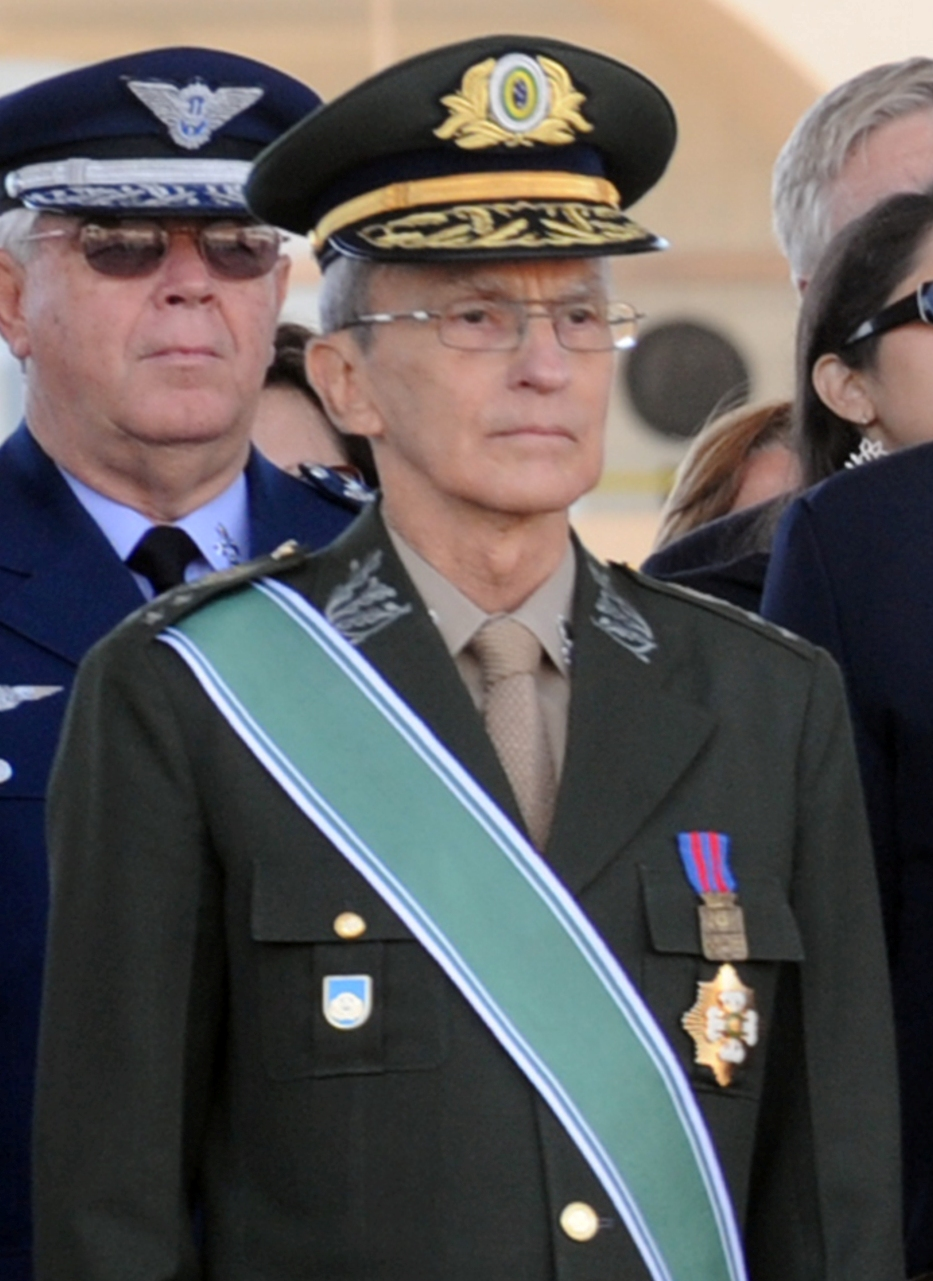
General Enzo Martins Peri, former Brazilian Army commander. He entered the Agulhas Negras Military Academy in 1960.

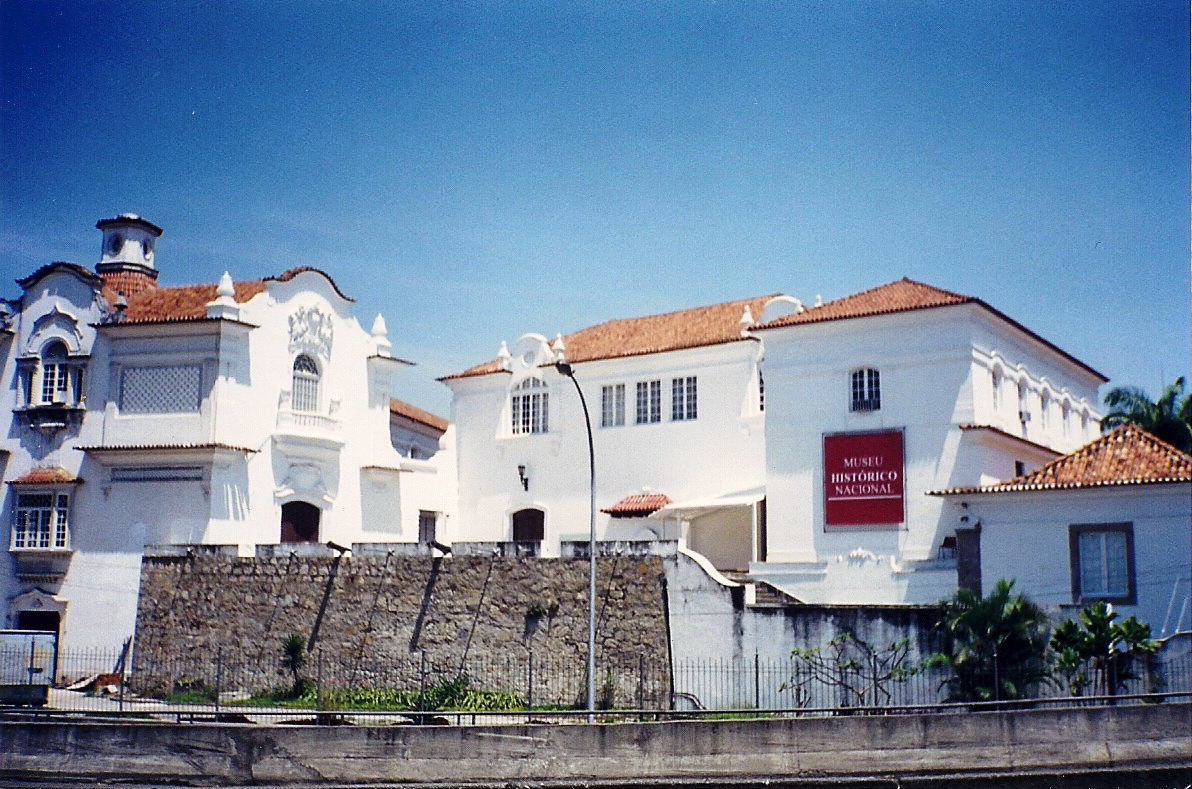
Building where the Royal Academy of Artillery, Blockhouse and Drawing was founded in 1792 by Queen Mary I of Portugal in Rio de Janeiro.

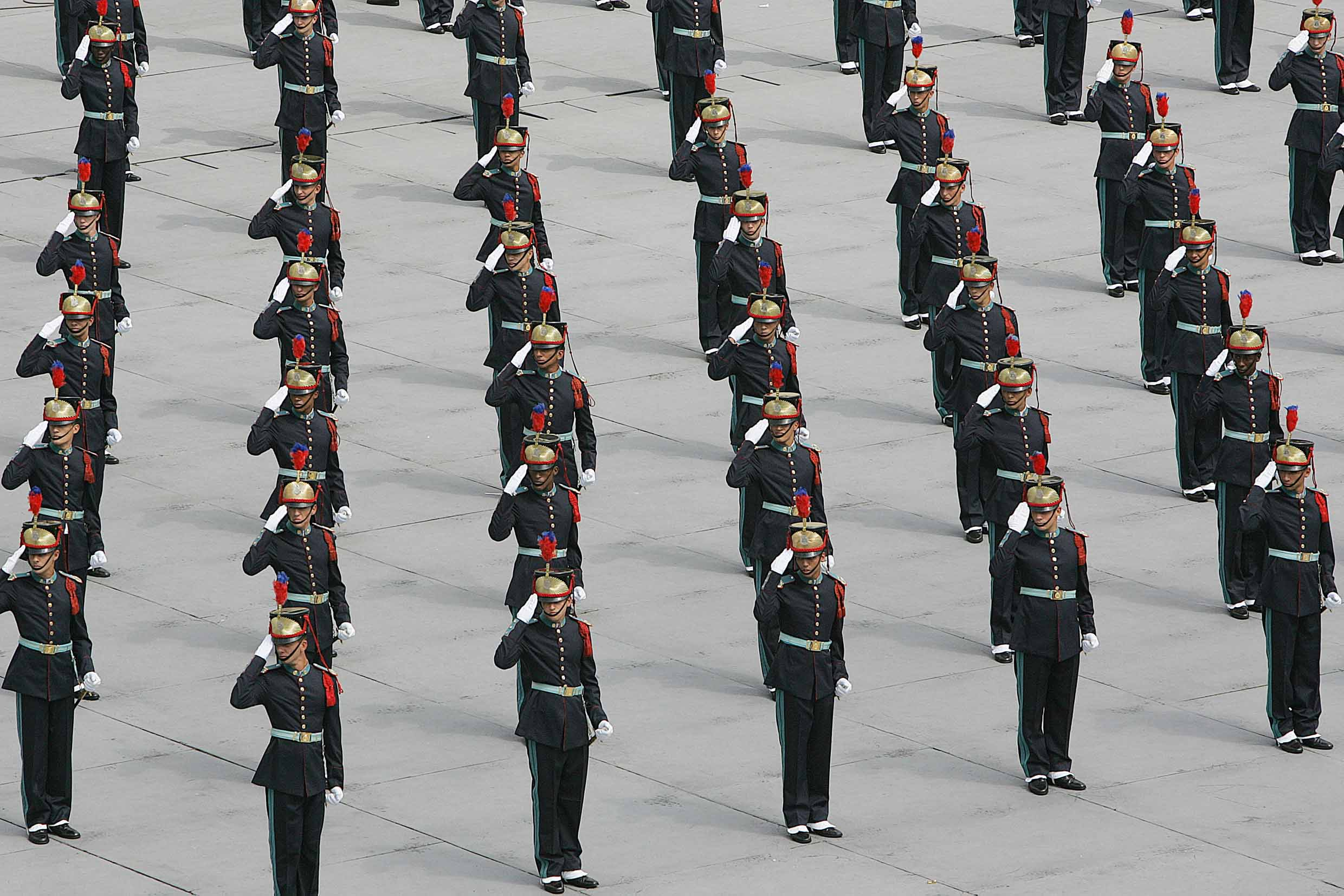
Presidential visit in 2006.

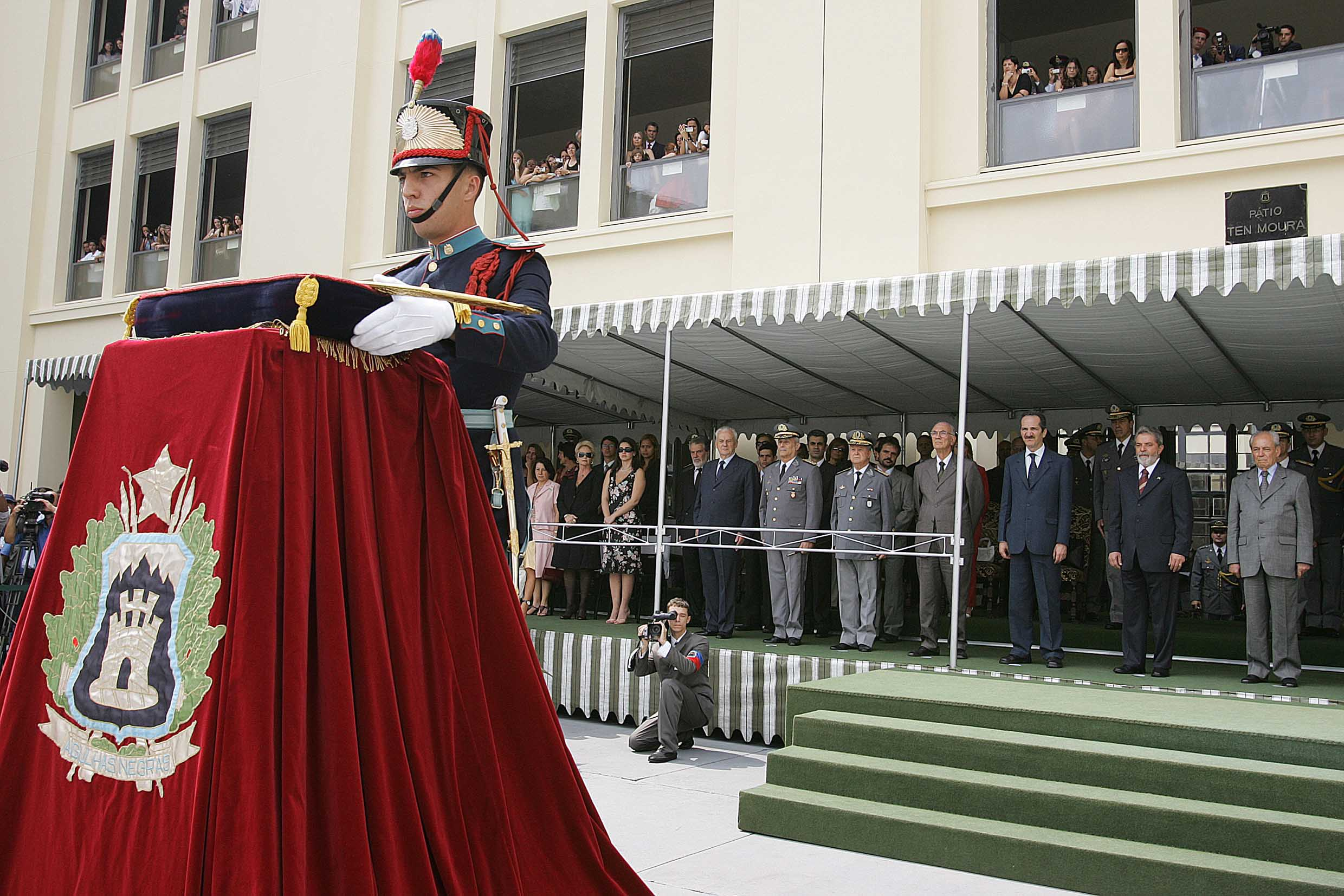
President Lula da Silva, the Minister of Defence Waldir Pires, Senator Rebelo and Generals listen to a speech by a cadet in 2006.

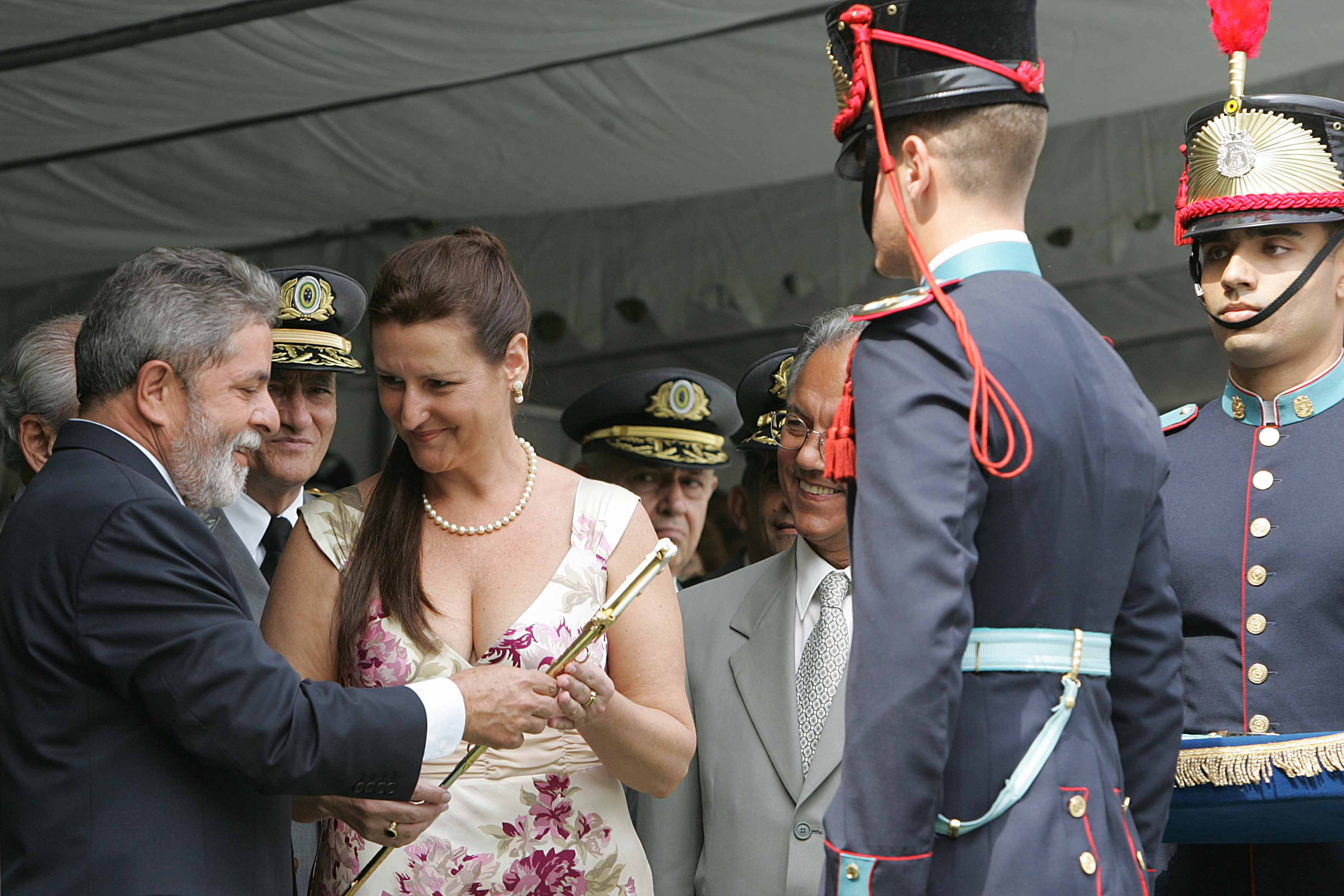
President Lula da Silva delivering a small replica of the saber of the Duke of Caxias to a cadet in 2006.

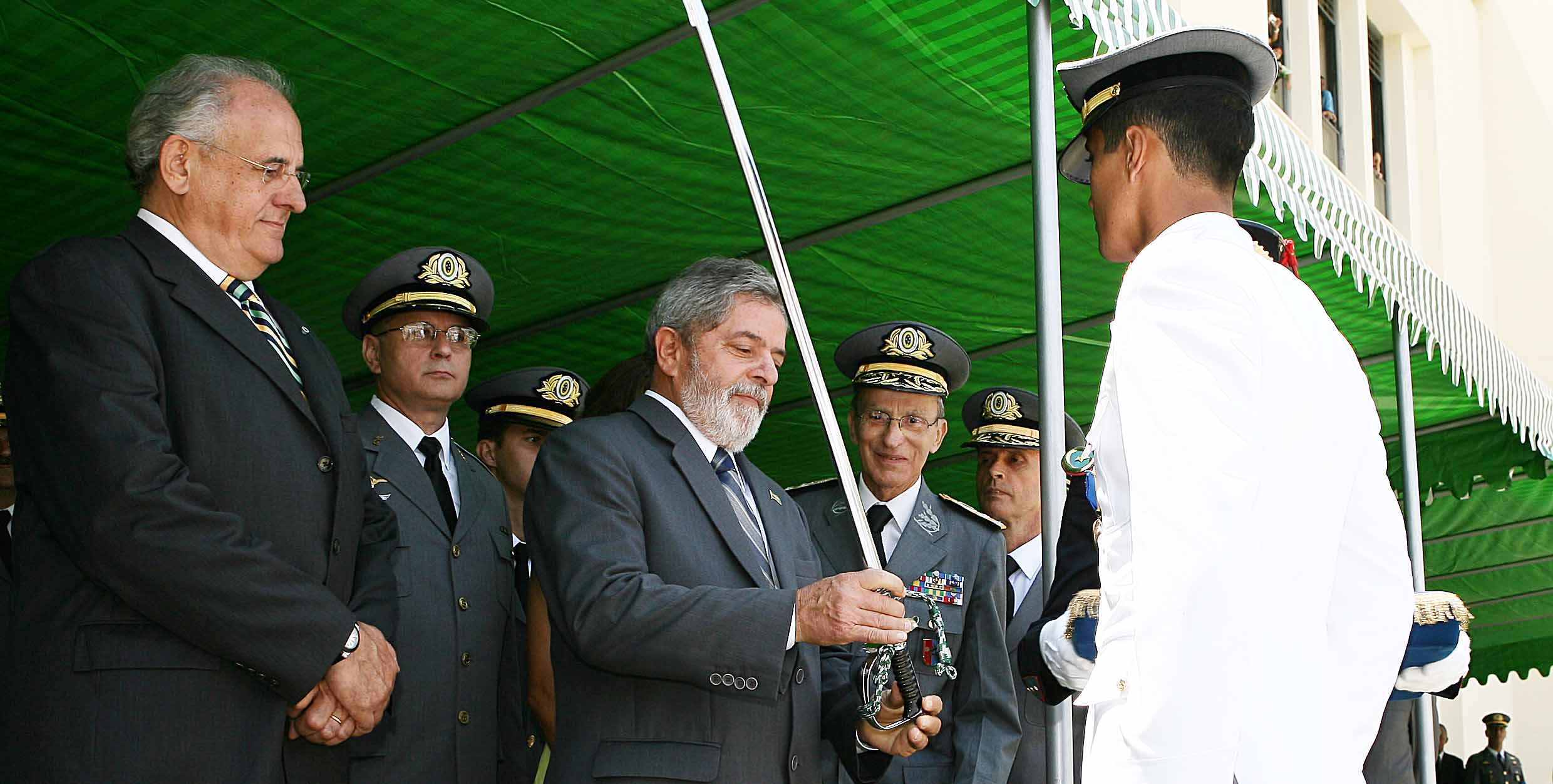
President Lula da Silva and the Minister of Defence Nelson Jobim delivering a sword during a graduation.

== See also ==
- Brazilian Army
- Escola de Comando e Estado-Maior do Exército
- Escola Preparatória de Cadetes do Exército
- List of Commanders of the Academia Militar das Agulhas Negras
- List of Commanders of the Escola de Comando e Estado-Maior do Exército
- Academia da Força Aérea
- United States Military Academy – the United States Army equivalent

== Bibliography and references ==
- "Academia Militar das Agulhas Negras" (in Portuguese). Brazilian Army. 2008-03-11. Archived from the original on 2000-08-18.
- Câmara, Hiram de Freitas (2011). Marechal José Pessôa: A Força de um ideal (in Portuguese). Biblioteca do Exército.
