= 1977 Brazilian military crisis =

Military crisis during the Ernesto Geisel government

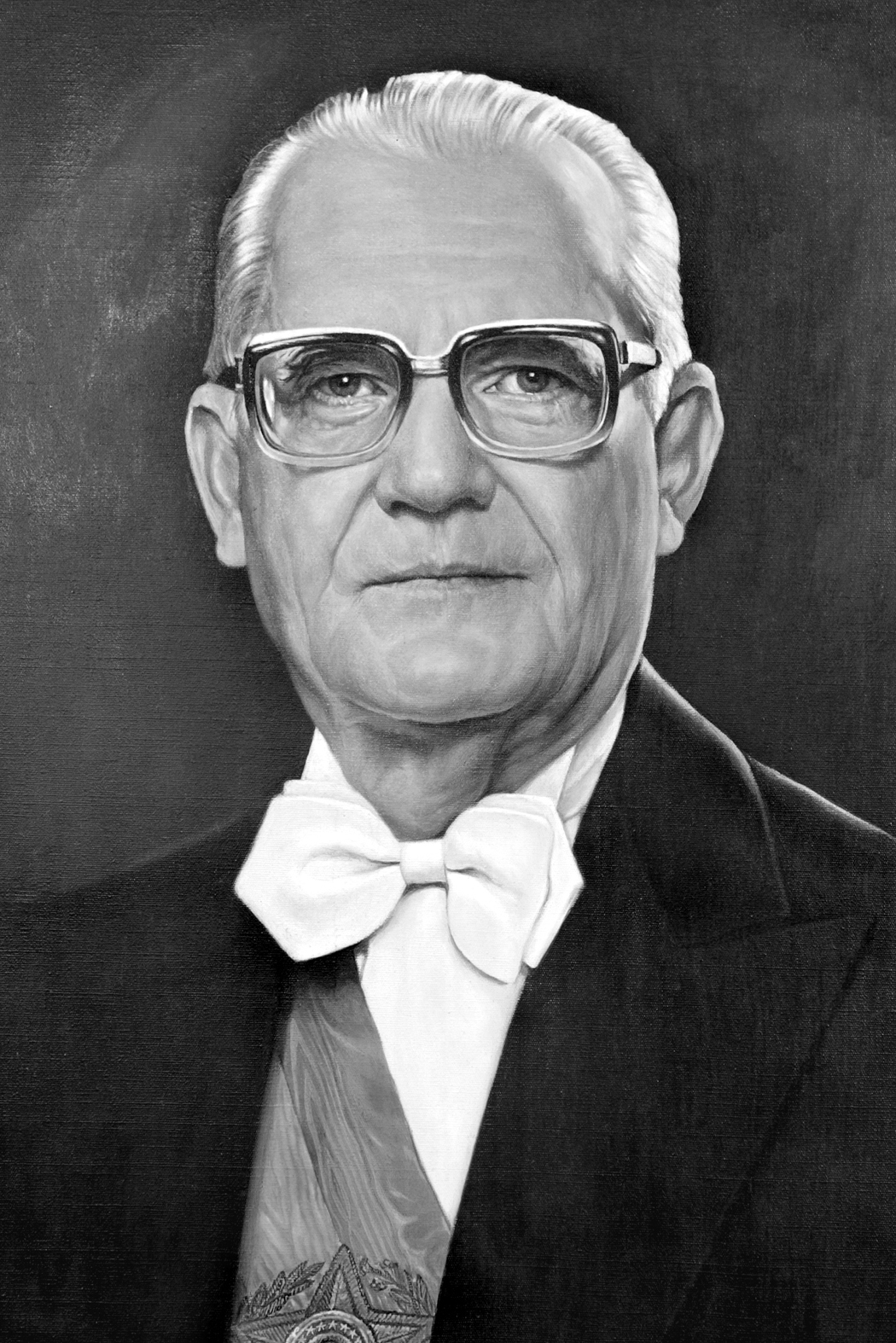
President Ernesto Geisel and the Army Minister Sílvio Frota

On October 12, 1977, a military crisis was triggered by the dismissal of then Army Minister General Sílvio Frota (Note: In old spelling: Sylvio Couto Coelho da Frota) by President Ernesto Geisel. The dismissal occurred that morning when Geisel summoned the minister for a brief meeting and informed him of his decision to remove him from office.

Sílvio Frota, as Army Minister, was a hardline military officer and strongly opposed President Geisel's proposal for a "slow and gradual" political opening (abertura). He even planned to run for president in 1979, clashing with Geisel on sensitive issues of the time — such as the decision to remove the commander of the Second Army, Ednardo D'Ávila Mello, in 1976, following the death of Manoel Fiel Filho in the custody of DOI-CODI.

== Background ==
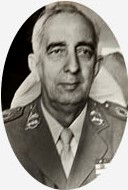
Ednardo D'Ávila Melo, commander of the Second Army until 1976.

Frota was part of the hardline faction within the Brazilian Army, representing the group of military officers opposed to political liberalization. This stance created friction between him and President Ernesto Geisel himself, as the minister's views directly clashed with those of the head of the Executive branch — particularly on issues such as the removal of Ednardo D'Ávila Melo, Frota's ally, from command of the Second Army following the death of factory worker Manuel Fiel Filho on January 17, 1976. The tension between the two persisted, and the following year, Frota — intent on running for president against Geisel's wishes — began mobilizing support to solidify his candidacy. Allies visited Brasília to rally backing for the minister, further straining relations with the government.

Silvio Frota, a Brazilian Army general, was promoted in July 1972 and assumed command of the First Army that same month. Following the inauguration of President Ernesto Geisel on March 15, 1974, he was appointed Chief of the Army General Staff, a position he held until May of that year, when he took over as Army Minister following the death of the incumbent, General Vicente de Paulo Dale Coutinho.

A hardliner within the Army, Frota opposed Geisel's proposed policy of "slow and gradual" political liberalization, creating tensions with the president. Their disagreements extended to the presidential succession — a topic Geisel intended to address only from January 1978 onward, having already shown preference for General João Figueiredo. Despite this, ARENA congressman Carlos Alberto de Oliveira threatened to nominate Frota as a presidential candidate in the National Congress, though he was blocked at the last minute.

Tensions between Frota and Geisel escalated dramatically on August 23, 1977, when the president unexpectedly demanded to review Frota's prepared speech for the Soldier's Day celebrations. This unusual request significantly heightened the conflict between them.

On September 8, 1977, Frota became embroiled in another controversy when he threatened journalist Lourenço Diaféria of Folha de S.Paulo. In his column, Diaféria had praised the heroism of Second Sergeant Sílvio Delmar Hollenbach, who jumped into a pit with giant otters at the Brasília Zoo to save a child. However, Diaféria simultaneously criticized the Brazilian Army's patron, the Duke of Caxias.

== Dismissal and coup plotting ==
On October 12, 1977, President Ernesto Geisel summoned Army Minister Silvio Frota to meet him that same morning in Brasília. Later that day, the two held a brief meeting in the presidential office, where Geisel opened the conversation with a blunt statement:

"Frota, we no longer see eye to eye. Your leadership at the ministry isn't following what we agreed upon. On top of that, you're running for president and already campaigning. I don't think that’s right. That's why I need you to resign."

Frota fired back:

"I won't resign."

To which the president coldly replied:

"Very well, then I'll dismiss you. The minister's position is mine to appoint, and I no longer have the necessary confidence in you to keep you in it. If you won't resign, I'll remove you from office."

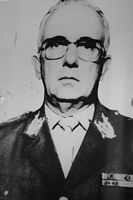
José Pinto de Araújo Rabello, commander of the First Army.

After leaving the Palácio do Planalto, Frota attempted to rally opposition against the president's decision, seeking support among fellow generals and drafting an eight-page manifesto meant to be distributed to all Army units — though it ultimately never was. Geisel, however, had already outmaneuvered him. The president had discreetly informed key generals of his decision beforehand, including Gustavo Moraes Rego Reis of the 11th Armored Infantry Brigade in Campinas, who then relayed the information to the commander of the Second Army in São Paulo. Two days earlier, Geisel had also consulted with First Army commander José Pinto de Araújo Rabello, who bluntly responded:

"You should have removed him sooner."

That same day, Frota's dismissal was officially published in the Diário Oficial da União, along with the appointment of his successor: Fernando Belfort Bethlem, former commander of the Third Army.

== Aftermath ==
Following his dismissal, Frota withdrew from political life, feeling ideologically sidelined. He only reappeared in the media after the enactment of the Amnesty Law, when he criticized the government and published a list of alleged communists within the civil service. After this episode, he remained out of the public eye until his death in 1996.

The more radical military officers who supported Frota were isolated, and their attempted backlash — seen by some as a coup attempt — was completely thwarted. The following year, President Ernesto Geisel repealed Institutional Act Number Five (AI-5), a repressive decree enacted during the hardline government of General Costa e Silva. Geisel then handed over the presidential sash to his chosen successor, General João Baptista Figueiredo, consolidating the political transition.

== See also ==
- 2021 Brazilian military crisis
