= Commander of the Brazilian Air Force =

- Comandante da Aeronáutica
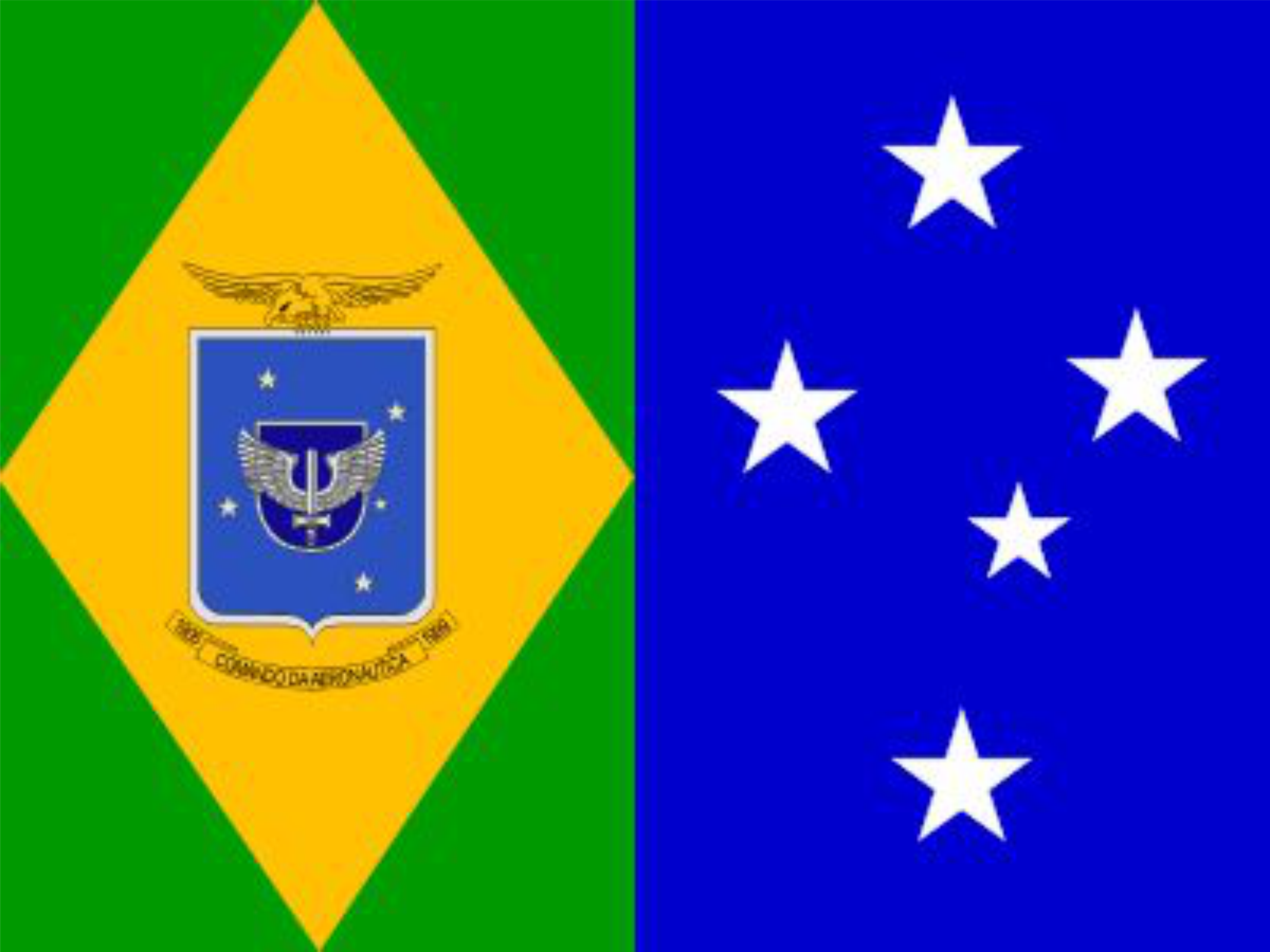
- Flag of the Commander of the Brazilian Air Force

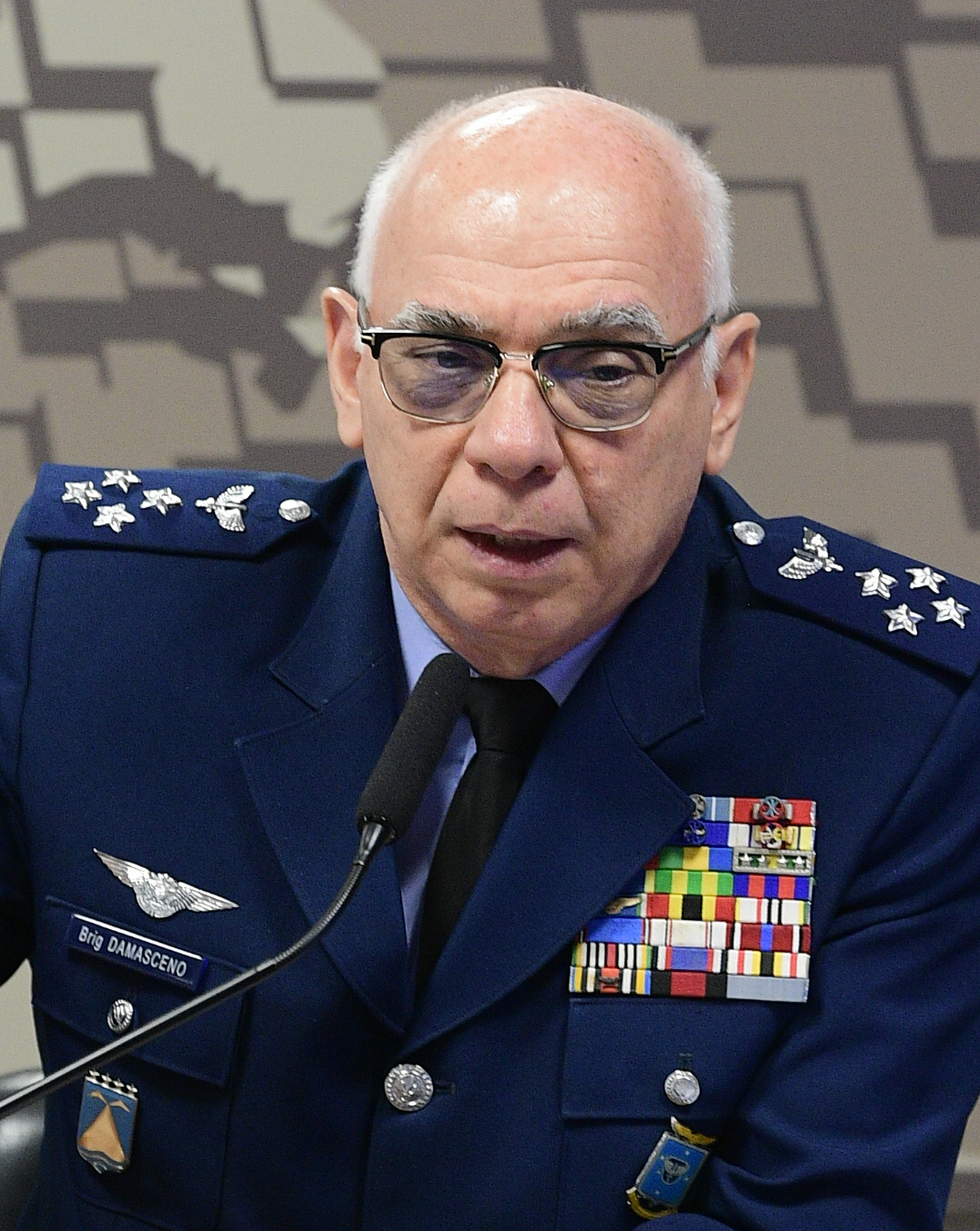
- Incumbent; Marcelo Kanitz Damasceno since 1 January 2023; 3 years ago
- Brazilian Air Force
- Style: Tenente-Brigadeiro-do-Ar
- Member of: Joint Staff of the Armed Forces
- Reports to: Minister of Defence
- Appointer: President of Brazil
- Formation: 20 January 1941
- First holder: Joaquim Pedro Salgado Filho

The Commander of the Brazilian Air Force (Brazilian Portuguese: Comandante da Aeronáutica, lit. 'Aeronautics Commander') is the head of the Brazilian Air Force and the leader of its Aeronautics Command (Comando da Aeronáutica or COMAer). The Commander holds the rank of Tenente-Brigadeiro-do-Ar (lit. Air Lieutenant Brigadier, a 4 star rank), is appointed by the president and reports directly to the Brazilian Minister of Defence. Prior to mid-1999 the Air Force was run by a military Ministry of Aeronautics.

== Third and Fourth Brazilian Republics ==
No	Name	Start	Finish	President
1	Joaquim Pedro Salgado Filho	20 January 1941	30 October 1945	Getúlio Vargas
2	Armando Trompowsky	30 October 1945	31 January 1946	José Linhares
2	Armando Trompowsky	31 January 1946	31 January 1951	Eurico Dutra
3	Nero Moura	31 January 1951	18 August 1954	Getúlio Vargas
4	Epaminondas Gomes dos Santos	18 August 1954	24 August 1954	Getúlio Vargas
5	Eduardo Gomes	24 August 1954	11 November 1955	Café Filho
6	Vasco Alves Seco	11 November 1955	31 January 1956	Nereu Ramos
6	Vasco Alves Seco	31 January 1956	20 March 1956	Juscelino Kubitschek
7	Henrique Fleiuss	20 March 1956	30 July 1957	Juscelino Kubitschek
8	Francisco de Assis Correia de Melo	30 July 1957	1 February 1961	Juscelino Kubitschek
9	Gabriel Grün Moss	1 February 1961	8 September 1961	Jânio Quadros
10	Clóvis Monteiro Travassos	8 September 1961	7 September 1961	Ranieri Mazzilli
10	Clóvis Monteiro Travassos	7 September 1961	17 September 1962	João Goulart
11	Reinaldo Joaquim Ribeiro de Carvalho Filho	17 September 1962	14 June 1963	João Goulart
12	Anísio Botelho	14 June 1963	4 April 1964	João Goulart

== Military dicatorship (Fifth Brazilian Republic) ==
No	Name	Start	Finish	President
13	Francisco de Assis Correia de Melo	4 April 1964	15 April 1964	Ranieri Mazzilli
14	Nélson Freire Lavanére-Wanderley	20 April 1964	15 December 1964	Castelo Branco
15	Márcio Melo	15 December 1964	11 January 1965	Castelo Branco
16	Eduardo Gomes	11 January 1965	15 March 1967	Castelo Branco
17	Márcio Melo	15 March 1967	31 August 1969	Costa e Silva
17	Márcio Melo	31 August 1969	30 October 1969	Military Junta of 1969
17	Márcio Melo	30 October 1969	29 November 1971	Emílio Médici
18	Joelmir Campos de Araripe Macedo	15 March 1971	15 March 1974	Emílio Médici
18	Joelmir Campos de Araripe Macedo	15 March 1974	15 March 1979	Ernesto Geisel
19	Délio Jardim de Matos	15 March 1979	15 March 1985	João Figueiredo

== Sixth Brazilian Republic ==
No.	Portrait	Name	Took office	Left office	Time in office	President
20	Octávio Júlio Moreira Lima [pt]	Octávio Júlio Moreira Lima (1926–2011)	15 March 1985	15 March 1990	5 years, 0 days	José Sarney
21	Sócrates da Costa Monteiro [pt]	Sócrates da Costa Monteiro (1930–2019)	15 March 1990	1 October 1992	2 years, 200 days	Fernando Collor
22	Lélio Viana Lobo [pt]	Lélio Viana Lobo (born 1931)	6 October 1992	31 December 1994	2 years, 86 days	Itamar Franco
23	Mauro José Miranda Gandra [pt]	Mauro José Miranda Gandra (1933–2018)	1 January 1995	20 November 1995	323 days	Fernando Henrique Cardoso
(22)	Lélio Viana Lobo [pt]	Lélio Viana Lobo (born 1931)	20 November 1995	4 January 1999	3 years, 45 days	Fernando Henrique Cardoso
24	Walter Werner Bräuer [pt]	Walter Werner Bräuer (1937–2018)	4 January 1999	10 June 1999	157 days	Fernando Henrique Cardoso
Commander of the Air Force; Comandante da Aeronáutica
(24)	Walter Werner Bräuer [pt]	Walter Werner Bräuer (1937–2018)	10 June 1999	21 December 1999	194 days	Fernando Henrique Cardoso
25	Carlos de Almeida Baptista	Carlos de Almeida Baptista (1937–2018)	21 December 1999	31 December 2002	3 years, 10 days	Fernando Henrique Cardoso
26	Luiz Carlos da Silva Bueno [pt]	Luiz Carlos da Silva Bueno (1940–2023)	1 January 2003	28 February 2007	4 years, 58 days	Luiz Inácio Lula da Silva
27	Juniti Saito	Juniti Saito (born 1942)	1 March 2007	29 January 2015	7 years, 334 days	Luiz Inácio Lula da Silva; Dilma Rousseff
28	Nivaldo Luiz Rossato	Nivaldo Luiz Rossato (born 1951)	30 January 2015	4 January 2019	3 years, 340 days	Dilma Rousseff; Michel Temer
29	Antonio Carlos Moretti Bermudez	Antonio Carlos Moretti Bermudez (born 1956)	4 January 2019	30 March 2021	2 years, 85 days	Jair Bolsonaro
30	Carlos de Almeida Baptista Júnior	Carlos de Almeida Baptista Júnior (born 1960)	12 April 2021	2 January 2023	1 year, 265 days	Jair Bolsonaro
31	Marcelo Kanitz Damasceno	Marcelo Kanitz Damasceno (born 1963)	2 January 2023	Incumbent	3 years, 248 days	Luiz Inácio Lula da Silva
