= 2021 Brazilian military crisis =

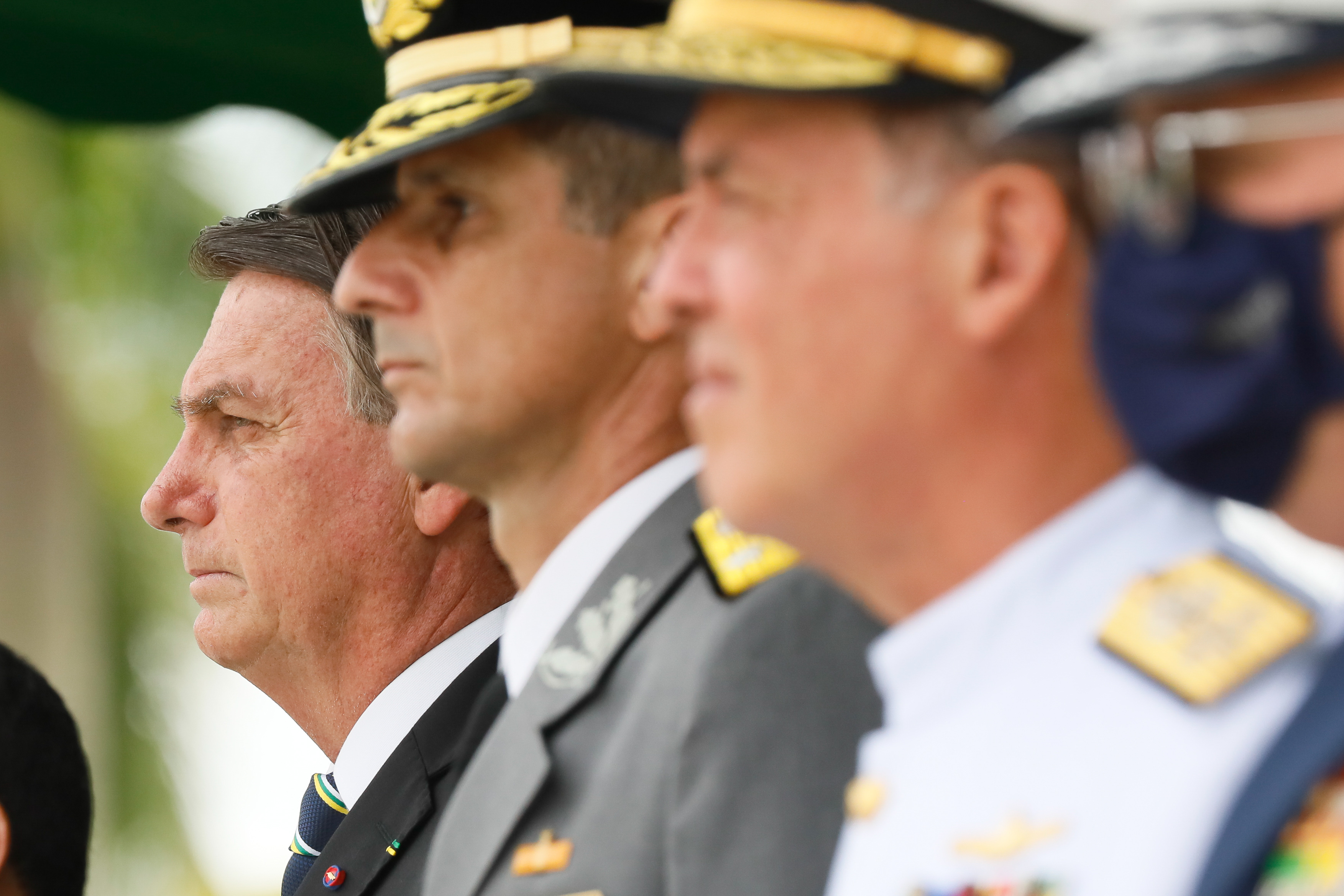
President Jair Bolsonaro and military authorities, in December 2020

A military crisis was triggered in March 2021 when Brazil's highest military officials resigned in response to President Jair Bolsonaro's attempts to politicize the armed forces. Since the beginning of his government, Bolsonaro had appointed an unprecedented number of military personnel to civilian positions, seeking to receive, in exchange, support from the military, including through public demonstrations in favor of his government's policies and against the measures adopted by the governors to confront the COVID-19 pandemic, in addition to advocating the decree of the State of Defense, as a way to increase its powers.

On March 29, after being fired by the president, Defense Minister Fernando Azevedo e Silva declared he had preserved the Armed Forces as "state institutions." The following day, Commanders Edson Pujol (Army), Ilques Barbosa (Navy) and Antonio Carlos Moretti Bermudez (Air Force) resigned, in an unprecedented act in the New Republic. The commanders' collective resignation sought to demonstrate their opposition to any political interference by the military. However, the crisis generated concerns related to the politicization of the Armed Forces and the possibility of President Bolsonaro planning a self-coup.

== Context ==
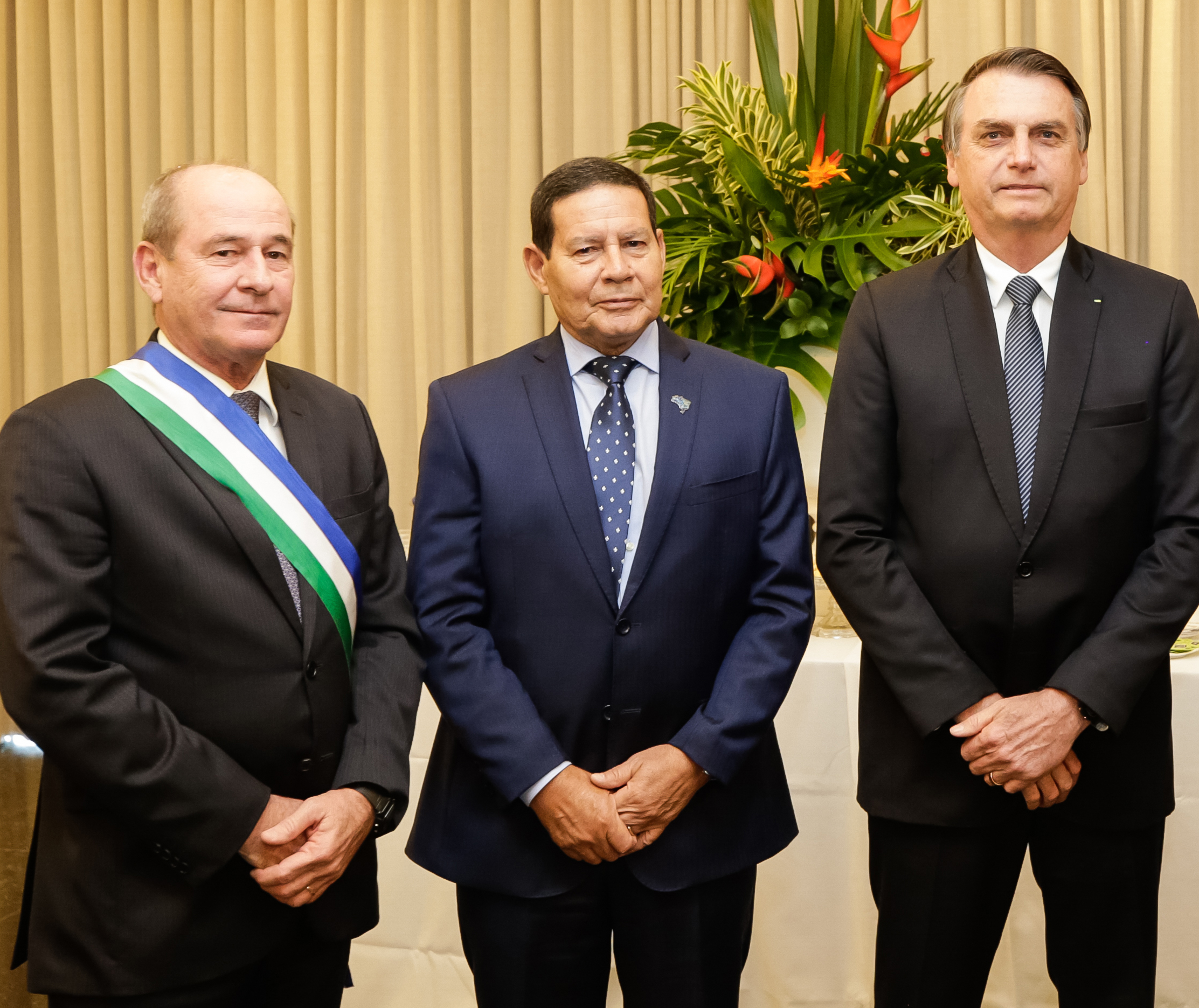
The Minister of Defense Fernando Azevedo e Silva, the vice-president Hamilton Mourão and the President Bolsonaro, June, 2019

Sworn into office in January 2019, President Bolsonaro, a retired captain and notorious supporter of the military dictatorship, gave the Armed Forces a space unprecedented in federal public administration during post-redemocratization governments. At the same time, the president repeatedly extolled the actions of the military governments, ordering a commemoration of the 1964 coup d'état, stating that "democracy and freedom only exist when Armed Forces want them to" and by continuously attacking the institutions of the Republic, such as the National Congress and the Judiciary, which "have resisted the attack, with strong public support."

Starting in 2020, as the COVID-19 pandemic advanced, Bolsonaro adopted a denialist and "chaotic" stance, and was one of the few world leaders to minimize the consequences of the disease. He was against isolation measures adopted by the governors of the states, arguing that they were harmful to the economy, and appealed to the Supreme Federal Court to overturn them, but the court rejected his claims more than once, in 2020 and 2021, because of the concurrent competence between municipalities, states, and the Union to define policies related to public health provided by the Federal Constitution.

In the face of the STF's decisions, Bolsonaro falsely claimed that he could not take any action against the pandemic. In August 2020, Piauí magazine reported that in May of that year, during one of the worst crises between the Executive and the Judiciary, Bolsonaro wanted to send troops to the STF because he believed the justices were overstepping the line in their decisions and diminishing his authority; the justices would purportedly be replaced. The president eventually gave up on the idea after General Augusto Heleno published a note critical of the STF.

Under the Bolsonaro administration, the budget of the Armed Forces registered a historic high. In the 2019 pension reform, Bolsonaro acted to maintain benefits for the military, such as readjustment and the right to retire with the last salary. In return, the president hoped to garner greater support and loyalty from the military, who were to be directly involved in government policies. In 2021, Bolsonaro started demanding that Army Commander Edson Pujol have a similar posture to former commander Eduardo Villas Bôas, who criticized the president's political opponents on social networks, such as former president Luiz Inácio Lula da Silva. Bolsonaro tried to fire Pujol, but Defense Minister Fernando Azevedo e Silva refused to do so.

My Army will not go into the street and force the people to stay at home

— Jair Bolsonaro, Bolsonaro on restrictive measures adopted by governors to contain the advance of COVID-19, on March 8, 2021

In March 2021, the pandemic worsened, Bolsonaro's popularity plummeted and rejection of his handling of the pandemic has increased. In the same month, the president questioned, before the Supreme Court, rules restricting the activities decreed by governors, on the grounds that they characterized exceptional measures, such as the State of Defense and the State of Siege, which could only be decreed by him. The action was rejected by the highest court. Observing the proposed action, law professor Wallace Corbo opined, "With this action at the STF what he is trying to do is, on the one hand, to remove his responsibility for the state of crisis and, on the other hand, to legitimize his actions should he want to decree a state of siege in the future to contain criticism and contain the opposition."

According to reports by military personnel, Bolsonaro proposed to Minister Azevedo e Silva for the Armed Forces to pressure Congress to pass a state of defense measure, an idea that Azevedo e Silva rejected. In March 2021, Bolsonaro denied to the president of the STF, Luiz Fux, that he intended to decree a state of siege. However, in the same period, President Bolsonaro's office sent a letter to several public agencies to analyze a representation that suggested the declaration of a State of Defense and federal intervention in state governments, supposedly to investigate misappropriation of public resources. The sending of the document was considered "just routine" by presidential aides.

== Events ==
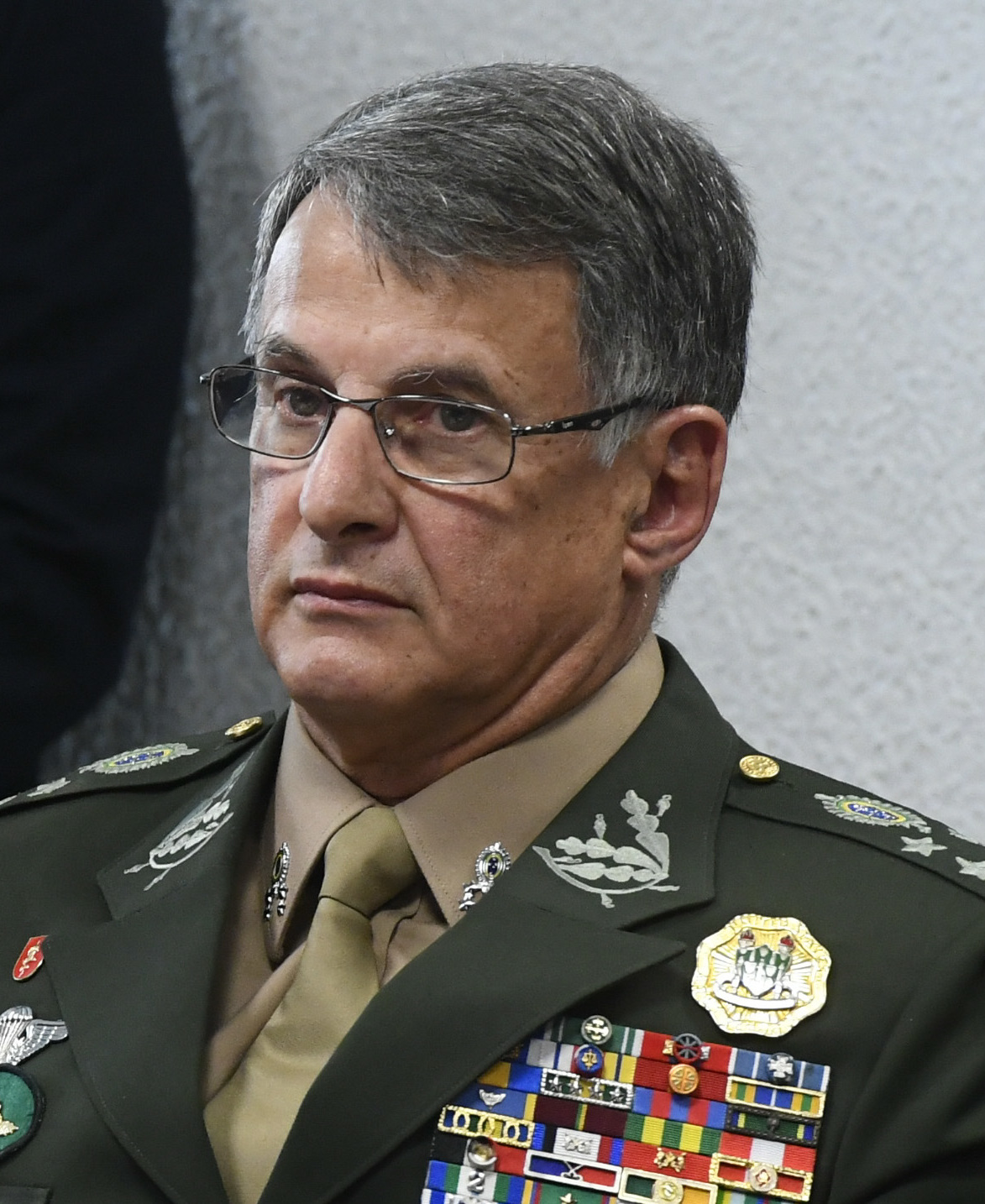
General Edson Pujol, Commander of the Army.

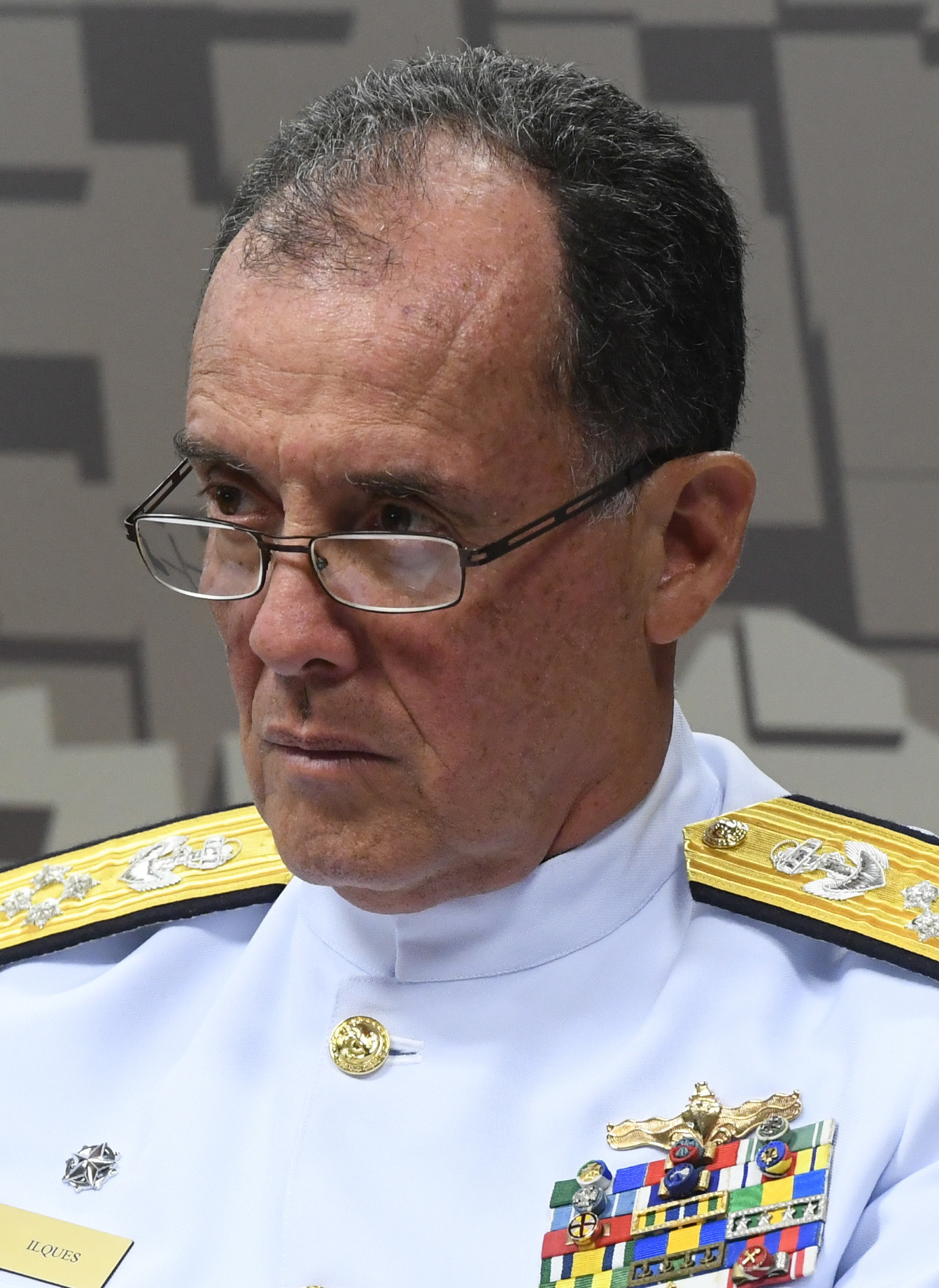
Admiral Ilques Barbosa, Commander of the Navy.

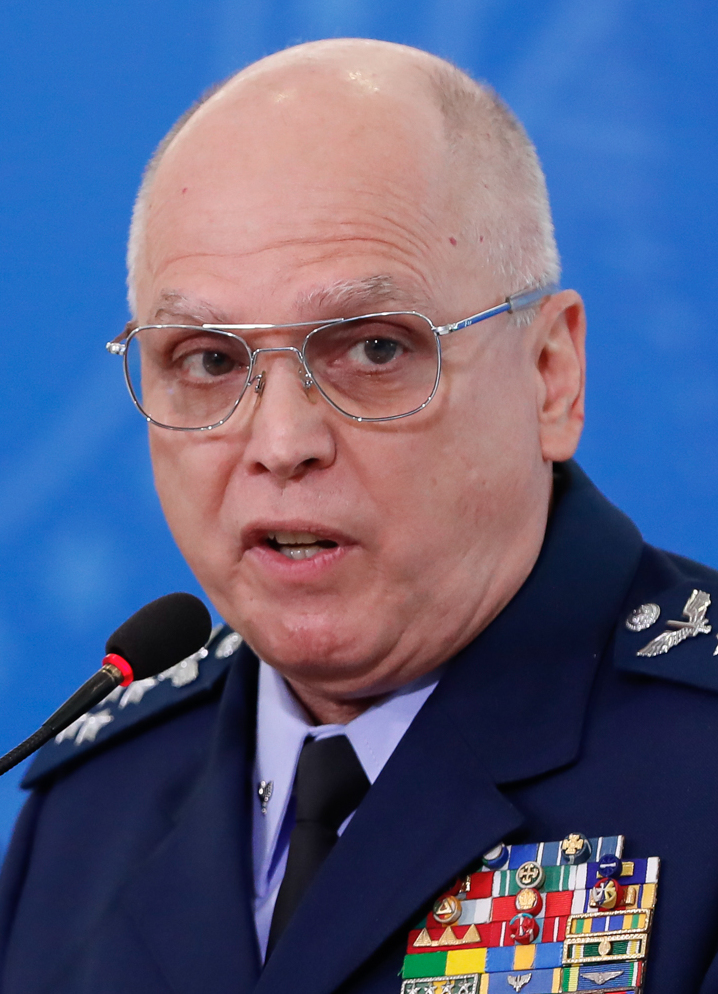
Lieutenant-Brigadier Amtonio Bermudez, Commander of the Air Force.

Armed Forces Commanders fired on March 30

On March 29, Bolsonaro dismissed Azevedo e Silva as defense minister, replacing him with General Walter Braga Netto, chief minister of the Civil House. In a statement, Azevedo e Silva said he had preserved "the Armed Forces as state institutions" and that he was leaving office with the "certainty of mission accomplished." On the same day of the resignation, Azevedo e Silva assured officials, including Fux and ministers of the STF, that there would be no risk of an institutional rupture because the Armed Forces were "committed to the democratic rule of law."

Relations between the president and the Minister of Defense had deteriorated in recent months, but the newspaper O Estado de S. Paulo reported that the "last straw" for the replacement was an interview given by General Paulo Sérgio in which he compared the Army's effective actions in the pandemic with the president's actions. To interlocutors, Azevedo e Silva stated that he was "uncomfortable in the government" and that there was pressure for the Armed Forces to get involved in politics, which he did not accept doing, culminating in his removal.

Azevedo e Silva's resignation surprised the commanders of the Armed Forces, Edson Pujol (Army), Ilques Barbosa (Navy) and Amtonio Bermudez (Air Force). On March 30, Braga Netto met with the three commanders to dismiss them. They were already determined to leave their posts in solidarity with Azevedo e Silva, whom they considered "competent and levelheaded." With the Defense Minister's resignation, the commanders decided that they "would not take any step that could violate the Constitution or characterize interference in measures taken by state governments during the COVID-19 pandemic," as well as "made it clear that they would never agree with interference in the Legislative and Judiciary branches."

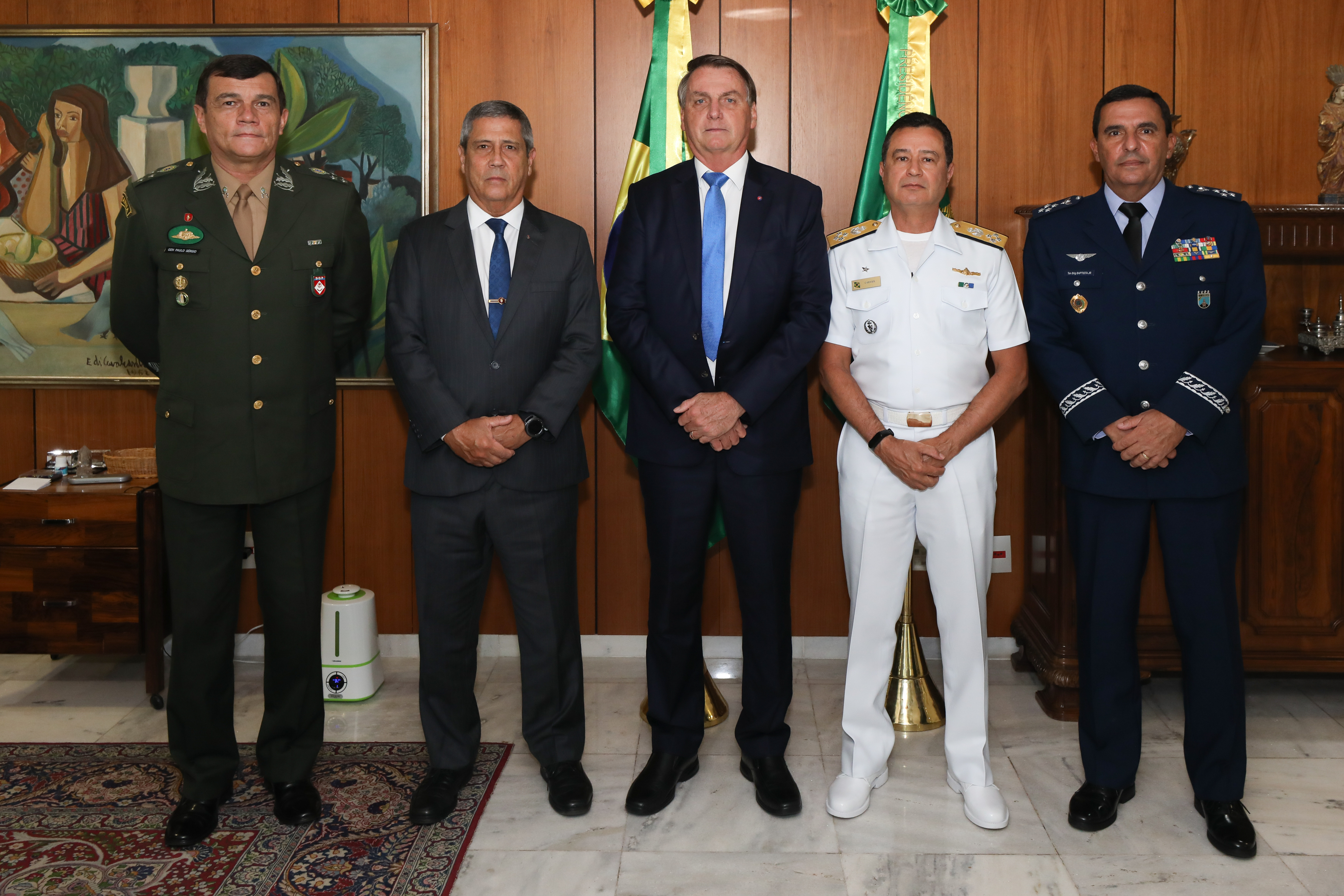
Bolsonaro with the new Minister Braga Netto and Commanders Paulo Sérgio, Carlos de Almeida Baptista and Almir Garnier Santos, in March 31

On March 30, the Ministry of Defense reported that the three commanders of the Armed Forces had left their positions. On the same day, Bolsonaro made a ministerial reform in the wake of the resignation of Ernesto Araújo, Minister of Foreign Affairs. The collective resignation marked the first time since redemocratization, in 1985, that the three commanders of the Armed Forces resigned without a change of government. It was also the biggest military crisis since 1977, when President Ernesto Geisel dismissed Sylvio Frota as Minister of Defense.

On March 31, Bolsonaro nominated the new commanders, chosen according to seniority, as a way to avoid escalating the military crisis. Paulo Sérgio, criticized by Bolsonaro and close to Pujol, was appointed to the Army, while Carlos de Almeida Baptista was appointed to the Air Force and Almir Garnier Santos to the Navy. General Paulo Sergio, as the pivot of Azevedo e Silva's resignation, was not Bolsonaro's preference for the command of the Army, but had as one of his guarantors former commander Villas Bôas, and his appeasing profile also weighed favorably.

== Repercussions ==
=== Political and institutional ===
The crisis was considered an attempt by Bolsonaro to increase his power over the Armed Forces. However, the actions of Brazil's highest military officials revealed the Armed Forces' determination to stay out of politics, demonstrating that they "do not accept authoritarianism, coups, and violation of the Constitution." Still, the episode caused concerns about the military's involvement in politics and the possibility of a self-coup by President Bolsonaro. Vice President Hamilton Mourão assured the public that the crisis would not generate an "institutional rupture" because the "Armed Forces will be guided by legality, always."

Opposition leaders demanded Bolsonaro's impeachment before his "authoritarian and coup delusions" became reality. Among the congressmen of the "Centrão", the president's support base, a climate of apprehension was created, with the idea that it was necessary to maintain "vigilance." In the upper house of parliament, senators asked Braga Netto to provide clarification "about a possible coup plot by the president of the Republic." Presidential candidates for the 2022 election signed the "Manifesto for Democratic Conscience," the text of which stated that democracy was under threat and should be defended.

The president of the Senate, Rodrigo Pacheco, considered that the exchange of commanders did not constitute a "risk of radicalism" or "threat to the institutions." For Pacheco, "we have a consolidated and guaranteed democracy, including by the maturity of the Forces, which understand their role and will understand that politics walks by itself." With a similar opinion, the president of the Chamber of Deputies, Arthur Lira, minimized the hypothesis that Bolsonaro is preparing for a "coup adventure," arguing, "There is no risk to democracy. Only if they kill everyone."

On March 30, journalist Monica Bergamo wrote that "Bolsonaro breaks hierarchy to attempt self-coup after leading country into anarchy," an opinion that was shared by Supreme Court justices. Bergamo stated that the ministers believed that the president was generating a "confusion in the military area" and that, in the face of a more acute crisis, he could "appeal to the support of military police in the states."

President Bolsonaro declared that he acted "within the constitution" and that he had limits to decree a state of exception, stating, "When there is talk of a state of siege, I cannot decree it. It is the Parliament that decrees it. And even a state of siege, I have limits, and it is for a complicated situation, of disturbance... I play within the Constitution. For some time, some authorities are not playing within the Constitution."

=== In the press and among analysts ===
In the foreign press, Reuters called the crisis an "unprecedented attempt [by a president] to meddle in the Armed Forces", National Public Radio reported that it was "the biggest political crisis to hit the Brazilian military in decades [...] all this while Brazil struggles with the world's worst increase in COVID-19 deaths", and NBC News noted that the changes "caused widespread apprehension of a military rearrangement to serve the president's political interests." Clarín wrote that Bolsonaro was "cornered by the out-of-control coronavirus pandemic" and CNN took the view that the change in the Armed Forces was aimed at "ensuring loyalty."

Speaking about the crisis, political scientist and professor Carlos Melo said: "The impact we will still have over time. It was clear that he [Bolsonaro] did not have the ascendancy over Defense that he intended to have, and is now seeking to have it, in a mistaken way, without understanding that the Armed Forces are of the state, not of the government. He moved one piece, Minister Azevedo moved another when he left, and the commanders gave up their posts. To measure the impact, we will have to see who the replacements will be."

Melo also evaluated the scenario of a state of siege, considering it a mistake, because: "The policy of social distancing is a public health policy. A state of siege is a political-military measure where the order of the state is in deep risk. To confuse these two things is an enormous, atrocious mistake. The president has artificially created this confusion to somehow enforce his vision of personalistic state policy."

Journalist and former politician Fernando Gabeira considered that the events represented a "victory of the Armed Forces over Bolsonaro" and an "attempt to redeem the Army's image," since "an active-duty general participated in this politics of death," and there is a need to "prevent the Armed Forces from being associated with the deaths of 310,000 people."

== See also ==
- 1977 Brazilian military crisis
- Constitution of Brazil
- Self-coup
