= Renato Rodrigues de Aguiar Freire =

Brazilian military officer

Admiral Renato Rodrigues de Aguiar Freire
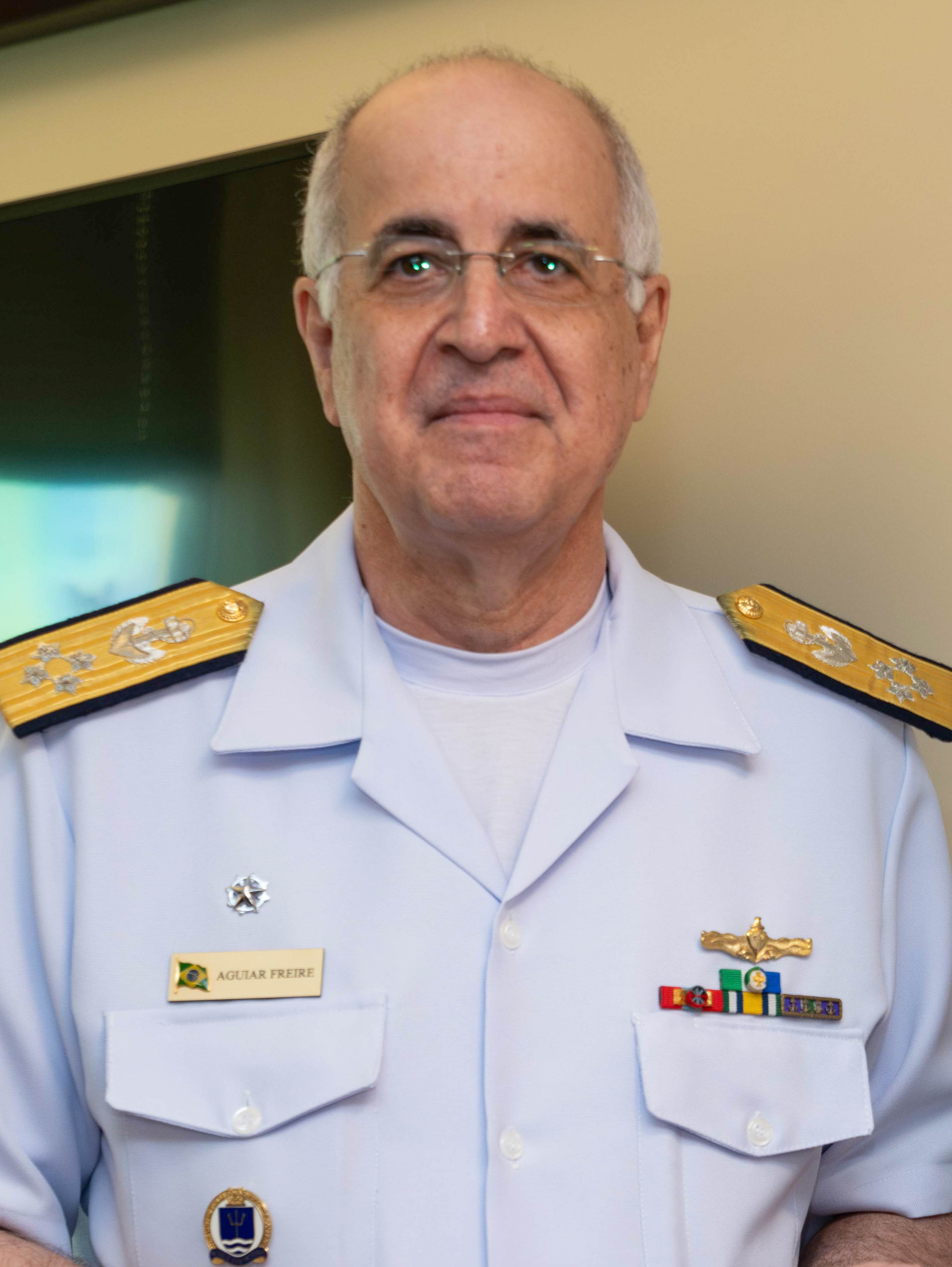

Chief of the Joint Staff of the Armed Forces
- Incumbent
- Assumed office January 9, 2023
- President: Lula da Silva
- Minister: José Múcio
- Preceded by: Laerte de Souza Santos

Personal details
- Born: 3 September 1960 (age 65) Natal, Rio Grande do Norte, Brazil

Military service
- Branch/service: Brazilian Navy
- Years of service: 1981–present
- Rank: Admiral

Renato Rodrigues de Aguiar Freire (born September 3, 1960) is a Brazilian military officer. He has served under President Luiz Inácio Lula da Silva as Chief of the Joint General Staff of the Armed Forces since January 9, 2023. Prior to this, he served as Chief of Naval Staff.

== Biography ==
Freire was born in Natal, Rio Grande do Norte on September 3, 1960. He began his military service as a midshipman in the Brazilian Navy in 1981. He has a degree from the Naval War College in the United States as well as a master's degree in defense studies from King's College London.

Following Luiz Inácio Lula da Silva's victory in the 2022 Brazilian presidential election, he was among the military leaders who convened with the then-President-elect in December 2022. He was nominated by Lula as Chief of the Joint General Staff of the Armed Forces and took office on January 9, 2023.

Military offices
Preceded by Laerte de Souza Santos	Chief of the Joint Staff of the Armed Forces; 2023–present	Incumbent
Order of precedence
Preceded by Marcelo Kanitz Damasceno as Commander of the Brazilian Air Force	Brazilian order of precedence as Chief of the Joint Staff of the Armed Forces	Followed by Luiz Henrique Pochyly as Secretary-General of the Ministry of Defence
