= Ademir Sobrinho =

Admiral of the Brazilian Navy

Admiral Ademir Sobrinho
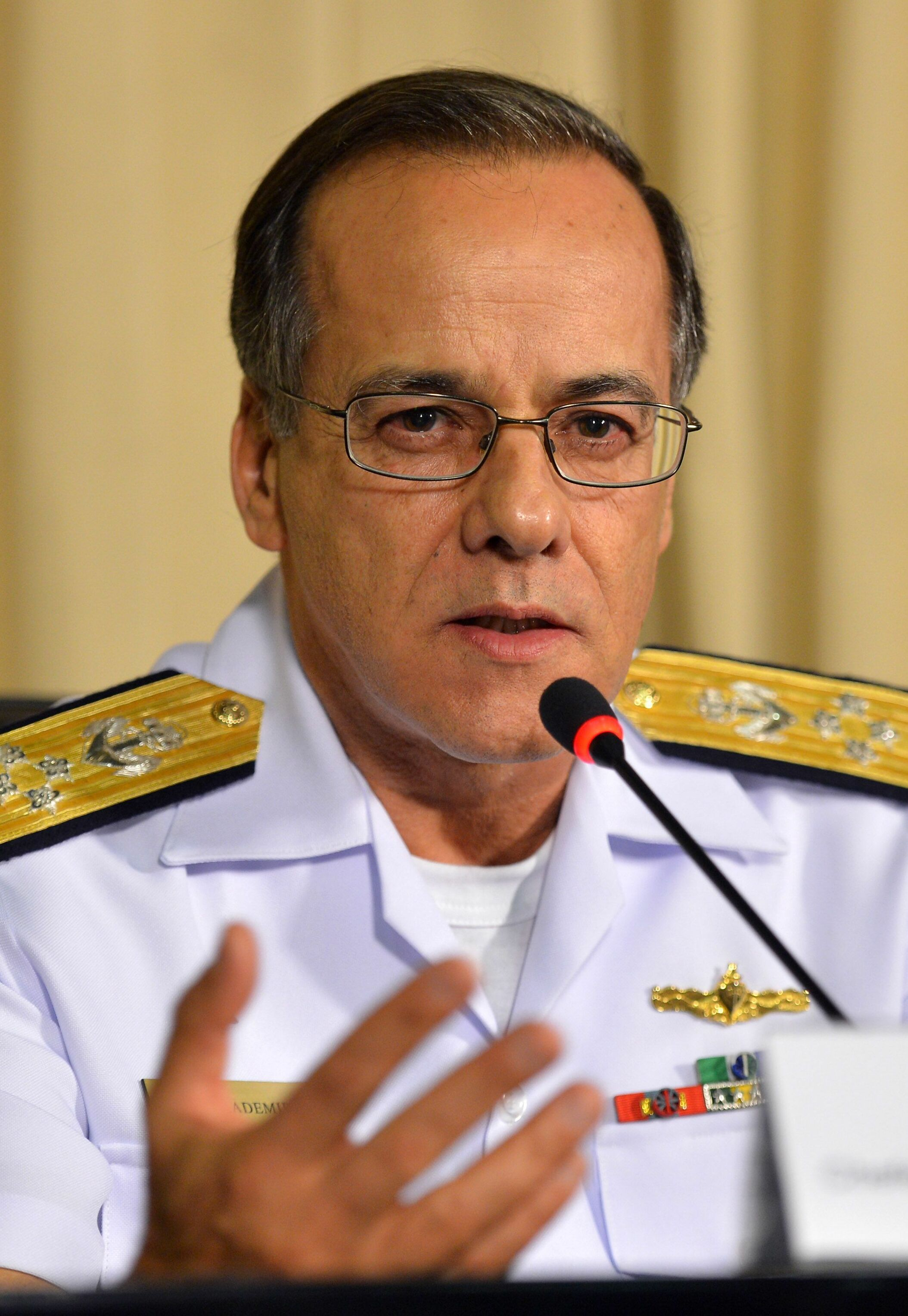

Chief of the Joint Staff of the Armed Forces
- In office 7 December 2015 – 15 January 2019
- President: Michel Temer
- Minister of Defence: Aldo Rebelo
- Preceded by: José Carlos De Nardi

Personal details
- Born: 6 July 1952 (age 73) Espera Feliz, Brazil

Military service
- Allegiance: Brazil
- Branch/service: Brazilian Navy
- Years of service: 1970−present
- Rank: Admiral of the fleet

Ademir Sobrinho (born 6 July 1952 in Espera Feliz) is a Brazilian Admiral of the fleet, and Chief of the Joint Staff of the Armed Forces between 2015 and 2019.

== Career ==
Sobrinho joined the Brazilian Navy in 1970, and was declared a Navy Guard in 1976. Throughout his career, he held, among other functions, the command of the Frigate Independência (F-44), the command of the River Patrol Ship Rôndonia (P-51), the naval attaché in Italy and the command of the Amazon Flotilla.

Military offices
Preceded by José Carlos De Nardi	Chief of the Joint Staff of the Armed Forces; 2015–2019	Succeeded by Raul Botelho
