= Nivaldo Luiz Rossato =

Lieutenant-Brigadier Nivaldo Rossato
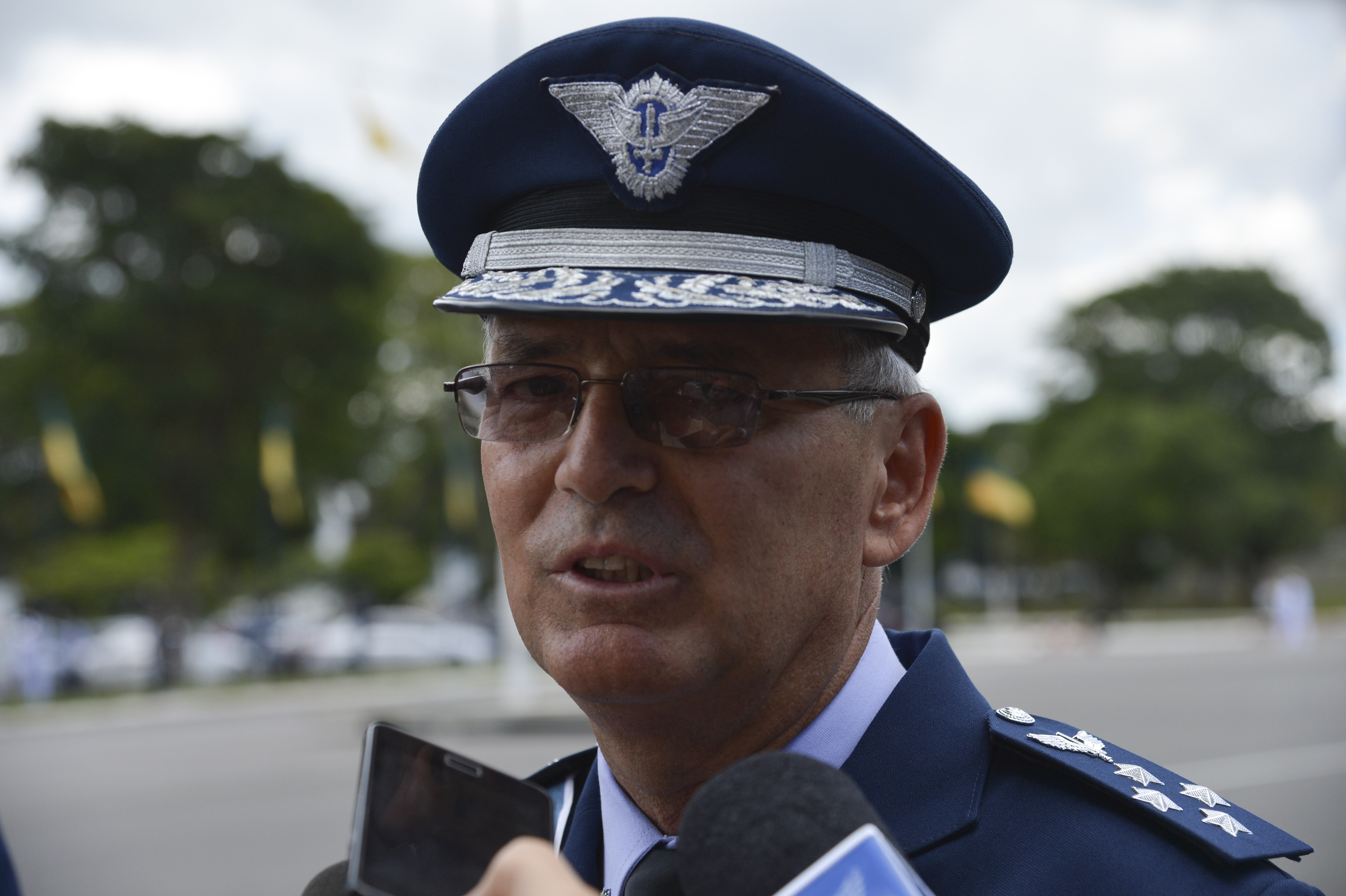

Commander of the Brazilian Air Force
- In office 30 January 2015 – 4 February 2019
- President: Dilma Rousseff; Michel Temer
- Minister: Jaques Wagner; Aldo Rebelo; Raul Jungmann; Joaquim Silva e Luna
- Preceded by: Juniti Saito
- Succeeded by: Antonio Carlos Moretti Bermudez

Personal details
- Born: Nivaldo Luiz Rossato; 26 August 1951 (age 74) São Gabriel, Rio Grande do Sul, Brazil

Military service
- Allegiance: Brazil
- Branch/service: Brazilian Air Force
- Years of service: 1969–present
- Rank: Lieutenant-Brigadier
- Commands: 2nd Squad of the 5th Aviation Group; Command Squad in Canoas Air Base; Basic Services Group in Santa Maria Air Base; 3rd Squad of the 10th Aviation Group; Aeronautic Attaché in Venezuela; Command and Air Operation Control Center in the General Command of Air Operations; Staff of the General Command of Support; 3rd Air Force; Staff of the General Command of Air Operations; 5th Regional Air Command; General Command of Air Operations; Staff of Aeronautics

Nivaldo Luiz Rossato (born 26 August 1951) is a senior officer of the Brazilian Air Force and its former commander.

Nivaldo Luiz Rossato was born on 26 August 1951 in São Gabriel, Rio Grande do Sul, Brazil. He has an Air Force career background as a fighting aviation group leader with between 3500 and 4600 hours of flight. Rossato replaced Air Lieutenant Brigadier Juniti Saito on 30 January 2015 as commander of the Brazilian Air Force.

== Dates of rank ==
Promotions
Rank	Date
Aspirant	10 December 1975
2nd Lieutenant	31 August 1976
1st Lieutenant	31 August 1978
Captain	31 August 1981
Major	25 December 1985
Lieutenant Colonel	30 April 1992
Colonel	31 August 1997
Brigadier of the Air	31 March 2003
Major-Brigadier of the Air	31 March 2007
Lieutenant-Brigadier of the Air	31 March 2011

== Notes ==
Military offices
Preceded by Juniti Saito	Commander of the Brazilian Air Force; 2015–19	Succeeded by Antonio Carlos Moretti Bermudez
