= I said NO! =

2026 memoir by Carlos Baptista Júnior

- Author: Carlos de Almeida Baptista Júnior
- Language: Portuguese
- Genre: Memoir; autobiography
- Publisher: Autêntica Editora
- Publication date: September 15, 2026
- Pages: 240
- ISBN: 978-6559287895

I Said NO: An Anti-Coup Trench (Portuguese: Eu disse NÃO: uma trincheira antigolpista) is a forthcoming memoir by Carlos Baptista Junior, a lieutenant brigadier and former commander of the Brazilian Air Force (FAB). It is scheduled to be released in 15 September 2026. The book will cover the crisis that hit the Armed Forces between 2021 and President Lula's inauguration, detailing meetings, pressure campaigns, and behind-the-scenes events of the coup attempt led by then-President Jair Bolsonaro following the 2022 elections, and revealing how the author formed a "trench" within the Air Force to resist coup-related maneuvers.
