= Juniti Saito =

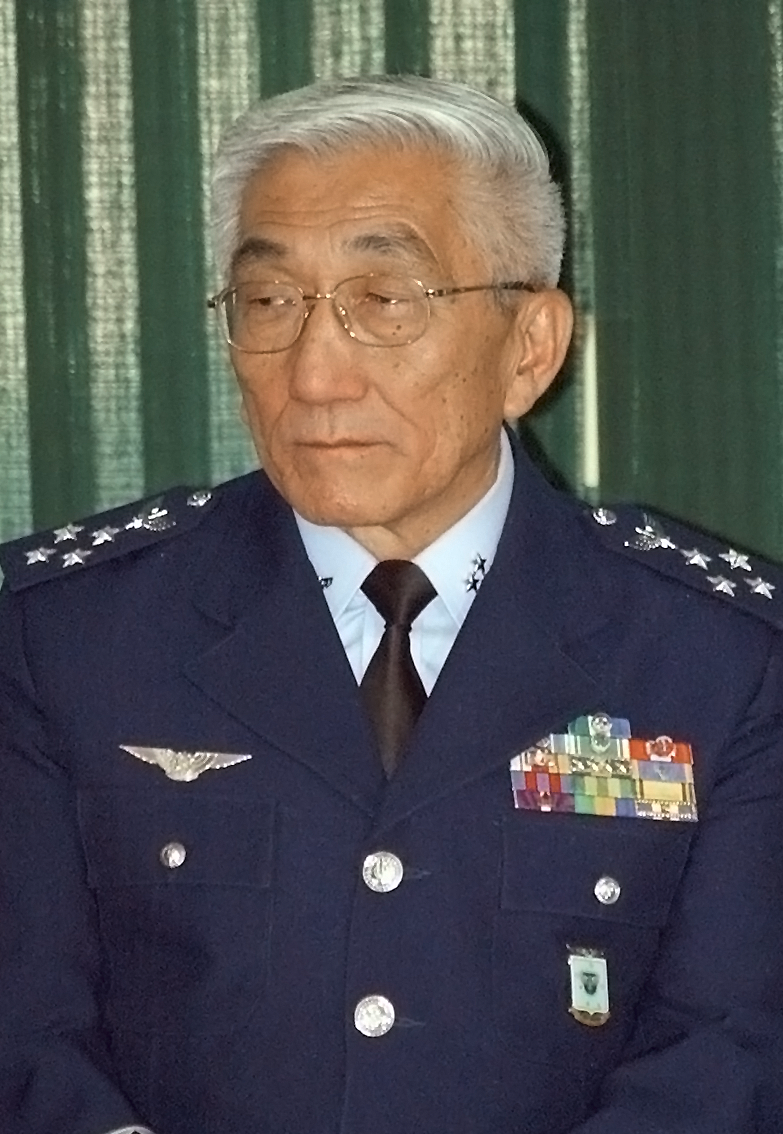
- Lt. Brigadier Juniti Saito; Commander of the Brazilian Air Force
- Born: April 12, 1942 (age 84); Pompeia, São Paulo, Brazil
- Allegiance: Brazil
- Branch: Brazilian Air Force
- Service years: 1960–2015
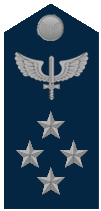
- Rank: Lieutenant-Brigadier

Lieutenant-Brigadier Juniti Saito (born April 12, 1942), is a military officer and was the commander of the Brazilian Air Force from 2007 to 2015.

Born in the city of Pompeia, São Paulo, he is the son of Iwataro Saito and Toshike Tamaoki.

== Flight information ==
Flight hours: more than 6,000
Aircraft flown: TF-33, F-80, Cessna T-37, VU-93, C-91 AVRO, C-95 (Bandeirante), AT-26 (Xavante), F-5E/F (Tiger II) e F-103E (Mirage III)

== Promotions ==
Rank (Brazilian Portuguese)	Rank Equivalent (English)	Date
Tenente-Brigadeiro-do-ar	Lieutenant-General	2003
Major-Brigadeiro-do-ar	Major-General	1999
Brigadeiro-do-ar	Brigadier General	1995
Coronel	Colonel	1988
Tenente-Coronel	Lieutenant Colonel	1981
Major	Major	1975
Capitão	Captain	1971
Primeiro Tenente	First Lieutenant	1968
Segundo Tenente	Second Lieutenant	1966
Aspirante	Aspirant	1965

== Awards and decorations ==
- Grand Cross of the Order of Aeronautical Merit
- Grand Officer of the Order of Naval Merit
- Grand Officer of the Order of Military Merit
- Grand Officer of the Order of Merit for Defence
- High Distinction of the Order of Military Judicial Merit
- Medal of the Farroupilha Merit
- Negrinho do Pastoreio Medal
- Medal of Inconfidence
- Medal of Military Sports Merit
- Grand Cordon of the Order of the Rising Sun (2015)
