= Raul Botelho =

Brazilian Lieutenant-Brigadier of the Brazilian Air Force

Lieutenant-Brigadier Raul Botelho
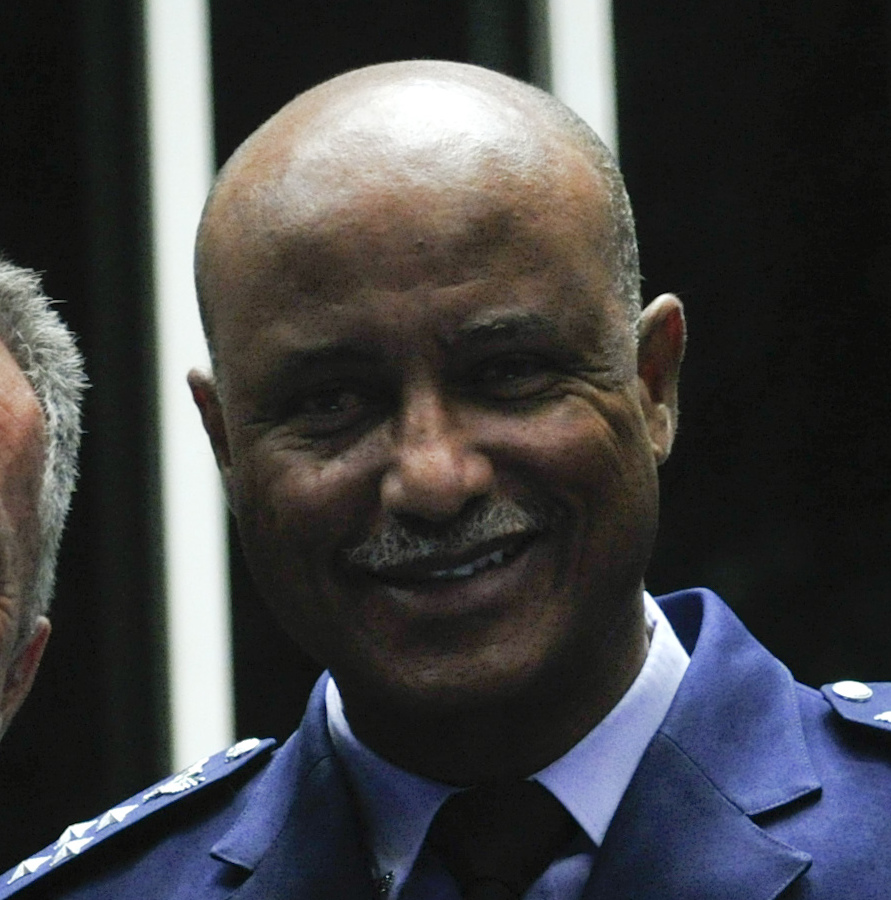

Chief of the Joint Staff of the Armed Forces
- In office 15 January 2019 – 31 May 2021
- President: Jair Bolsonaro
- Minister: Fernando Azevedo e Silva
- Preceded by: Ademir Sobrinho
- Succeeded by: Laerte de Souza Santos

Personal details
- Born: 22 July 1957 (age 69) São Paulo, São Paulo, Brazil
- Education: Brazilian Air Force Academy

Military service
- Allegiance: Brazil
- Branch/service: Brazilian Air Force
- Years of service: 1973–2019
- Rank: Lieutenant-Brigadier

Raul Botelho (born 22 July 1957) is a Brazilian Lieutenant-Brigadier of the Brazilian Air Force, who has served as Chief of the Joint Staff of the Armed Forces of the Brazilian Armed Forces since 2019.

== Military career ==
Joined the Air Force in 1973, being declared Aspirant in 1979. He was promoted to Brigadier in March 2007 and to Lieutenant-Brigadier in March 2015.

An aerial reconnaissance and search and rescue pilot, Botelho holds a Bachelor of Business Administration for the Mackenzie Presbyterian University and executive MBA in Administrative Management. He has 3,600 flight hours and flown various planes in the air force, such as the Aerotec Uirapuru, the Neiva Universal, the Embraer EMB 110 Bandeirante, the Lockheed C-130 Hercules, and the Embraer EMB 312 Tucano.

He commanded various units of the Air Force, such as the 1st squadron of the 6th Aviation Group, the 1st Air Force, the Third Regional Air Command, the COMGEP, and the Aeronautical Officers Promotion Commission, before becoming the Chief of Staff of the Air Force. He also became a military observer serving in Mozambique.

On January 15, 2019, President Jair Bolsonaro named him as the Chief of the Joint Staff of the Armed Forces of the Brazilian Armed Forces, replacing Admiral Ademir Sobrinho.

He left the command of the Joint Staff on 31 May 2021.

== See also ==
- Brazilian Air Force
- Brazilian Armed Forces
- Joint Staff of the Armed Forces
- Ministry of Defence (Brazil)

Military offices
Preceded by Ademir Sobrinho	Chief of the Joint Staff of the Armed Forces; 2019–2021	Succeeded by Laerte de Souza Santos
