= Marcelo Kanitz Damasceno =

Brazilian military officer

Brigadier Marcelo Kanitz
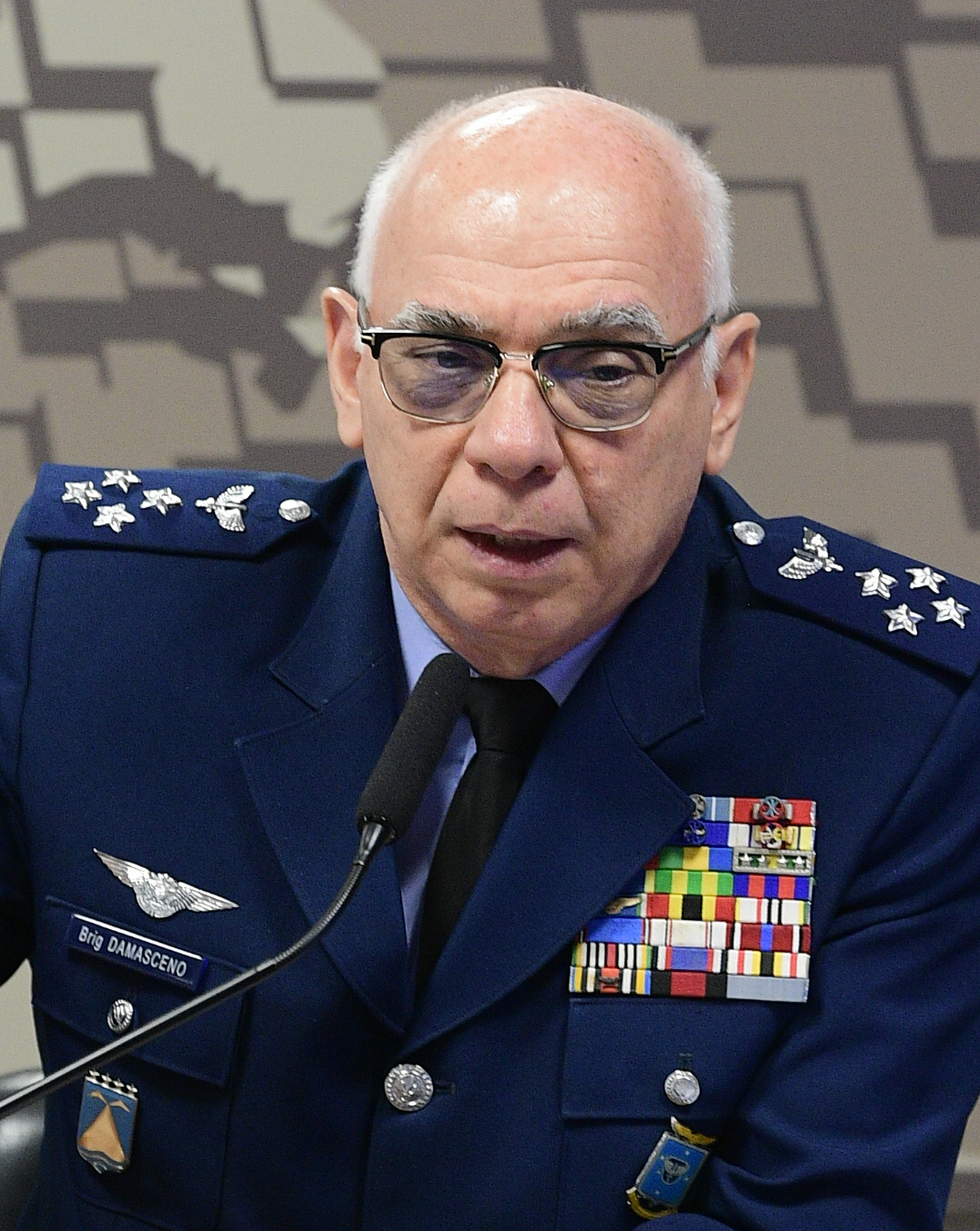

Commander of the Brazilian Air Force
- Incumbent
- Assumed office 2 January 2023
- President: Luiz Inácio Lula da Silva
- Minister: José Múcio
- Preceded by: Carlos de Almeida Baptista Júnior

Personal details
- Born: 22 August 1959 (age 66) Canoas, Rio Grande do Sul, Brazil

Military service
- Allegiance: Brazil
- Branch/service: Brazilian Air Force
- Years of service: 1976–present
- Rank: Lieutenant-brigadier

Marcelo Kanitz Damasceno (born 22 August 1959) is a Brazilian military officer who commands the Brazilian Air Force.

== Biography ==
Brigadier Damasceno was commander of the Brasília Air Base, Defense and Air Force Aide to the Brazilian Embassy in Brussels, Belgium and in Paris, France, besides Secretary of Economy, Finances and Management of the Air Force and Chief of Staff of the Air Force.

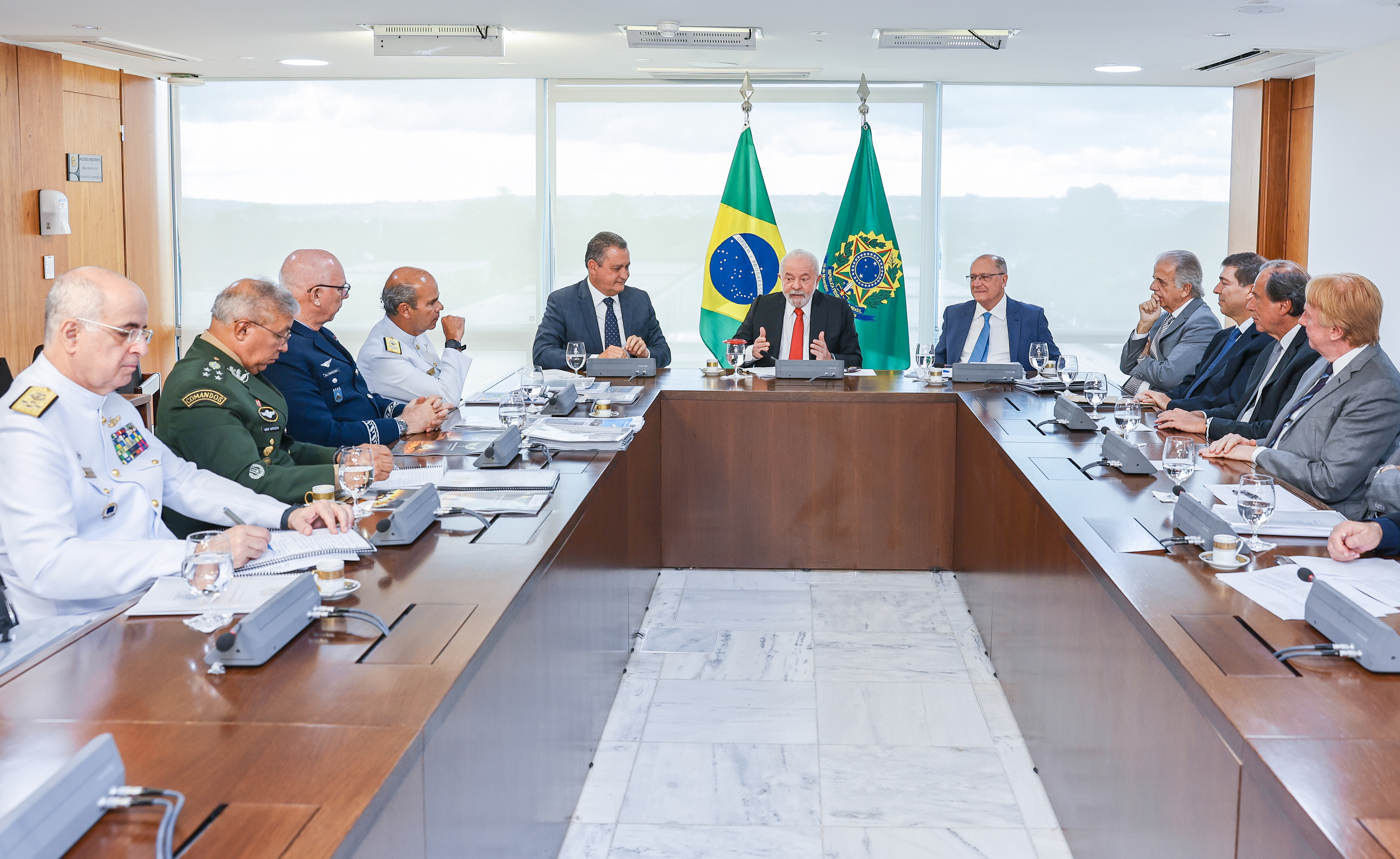
Brigadier Damasceno in a meeting with president Lula da Silva, VP Alckmin, Chief of Staff Costa, Defense Minister Múcio, Armed Forces commanders and entrepreneurs.

Military offices
Preceded by Carlos de Almeida Baptista Júnior	Commander of the Brazilian Air Force; 2023–present	Incumbent
Order of precedence
Preceded by Tomás Ribeiro Paiva as Commander of the Brazilian Army	Brazilian order of precedence as Commander of the Brazilian Air Force	Followed by Renato Aguiar Freire as Chief of the Joint Staff of the Armed Forces
