= Laerte de Souza Santos =

Chief of the Joint Staff of the Brazilian Armed Forces

General Laerte de Souza Santos
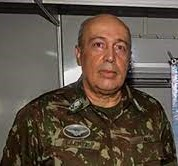

Chief of the Joint Staff of the Armed Forces
- In office 31 May 2021 – 21 November 2022
- President: Jair Bolsonaro
- Minister: Walter Braga Netto; Paulo Sérgio Nogueira
- Preceded by: Raul Botelho
- Succeeded by: Renato Rodrigues de Aguiar Freire

Personal details
- Born: 2 September 1958 (age 67) Rio de Janeiro, Federal District, Brazil

Military service
- Allegiance: Brazil
- Branch/service: Brazilian Army
- Years of service: 1974–present
- Rank: Army General

Laerte de Souza Santos (born 2 September 1958) is a Brazilian Army General and former Chief of the Joint Staff of the Armed Forces. Santos became commander on 31 May 2021, replacing Raul Botelho.

== Career ==
Santos started his military career on 4 March 1974, at the Army Cadet Preparatory School, and later the Agulhas Negras Military Academy. He was declared an aspiring officer on 15 December 1980. On 31 March 2018, Santos reached the last post of his military career, as Army General.

Military offices
Preceded by Raul Botelho	Chief of the Joint Staff of the Armed Forces; 2021–2022	Succeeded by Renato Rodrigues de Aguiar Freire
