= José Carlos De Nardi =

José Carlos de Nardi
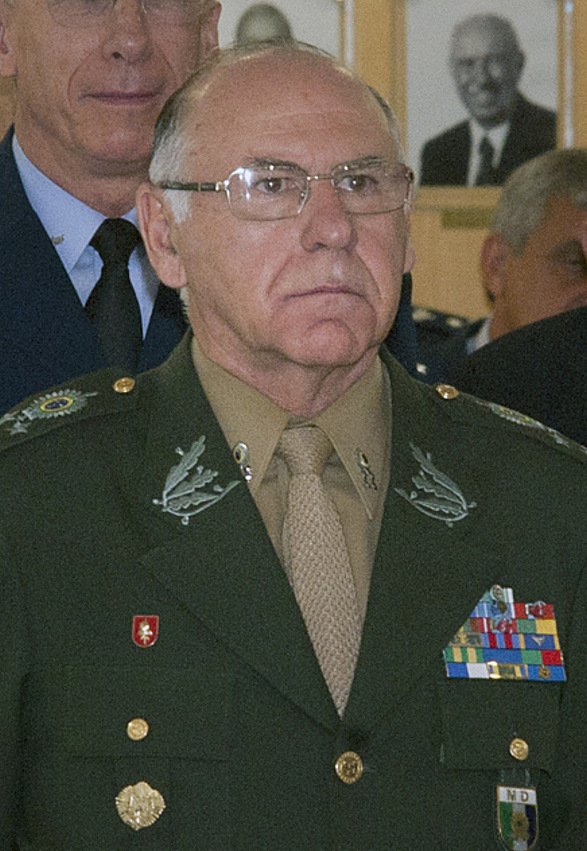
- General José Carlos de Nardi
- Born: 6 January 1944 (age 82); Farroupilha
- Military career
- Allegiance: Brazil
- Branch: Brazilian Army
- Service years: 1961-present
- Rank: General of the Army
- Commands: Chief of the Joint Staff of the Armed Forces

General José Carlos de Nardi, is the former Chief of the Joint Staff of the Armed Forces of Brazil. De Nardi was sworn in as the first Chief of the Joint Staff of the Armed Forces by then-Defense Minister Nelson Jobim on 6 September 2010. On 8 December 2015, Admiral Ademir Sobrinho was sworn in as the second Chief of the Joint Staff by Defense Minister Aldo Rebelo.
