= Carlos de Almeida Baptista Júnior =

Commander of the Brazilian Air Force

Lieutenant-Brigadier Carlos de Almeida Baptista Júnior

Commander of the Brazilian Air Force
- In office 12 April 2021 – 2 January 2023
- President: Jair Bolsonaro
- Minister: Walter Braga Netto; Paulo Sérgio Nogueira
- Preceded by: Antonio Carlos Moretti Bermudez
- Succeeded by: Marcelo Kanitz Damasceno

Personal details
- Born: 5 September 1960 (age 66) Rio de Janeiro, Guanabara, Brazil

Military service
- Allegiance: Brazil
- Branch/service: Brazilian Air Force
- Years of service: 1975–present
- Rank: Lieutenant-Brigadier

Carlos de Almeida Baptista Júnior (born 5 September 1960 in Rio de Janeiro) is a Brazilian military officer and Lieutenant-Brigadier of the Air, who served as Commander of the Brazilian Air Force from 2021 to 2023. Baptista Júnior became commander in April 2021, replacing Antonio Carlos Moretti Bermudez.

== Personal life ==
Baptista Júnior joined the Air Force on 3 March 1975 and was promoted to Lieutenant Brigadier in 2018. He is the son of the former Commander of the Air Force, Lieutenant-Brigadier of the Air, Carlos de Almeida Baptista, who was in command between 1999 and 2003.

In August 2026, Baptista Junior announced that he would publish a memoir, I Said NO: An Anti-Coup Trench, about the behind-the-scenes events of the 2022 coup plot.

Before assuming command of the Air Force, Baptista Júnior held a number of operational and staff positions, including command of air units and assignments in the Air Force high command structure. As commander, he oversaw the continuation of modernization programs such as the incorporation of the Gripen E/F fighter aircraft and the expansion of the KC-390 transport fleet.

== Military Awards ==
- Order of Defence Merit (Grand Officer) (Note: Portuguese: Ordem do Mérito da Defesa - Grande-Oficial)
- Order of Aeronautical Merit (Grand Officer) (Note: Portuguese: Ordem do Mérito Aeronáutico - Grande-Oficial)
- Order of Naval Merit (Grand Officer) (Note: Portuguese: Ordem do Mérito Naval - Grande-Oficial)
- Order of Military Merit (Grand Officer - Grande-Oficial)
- Order of Military Judiciary Merit (Grand Officer)
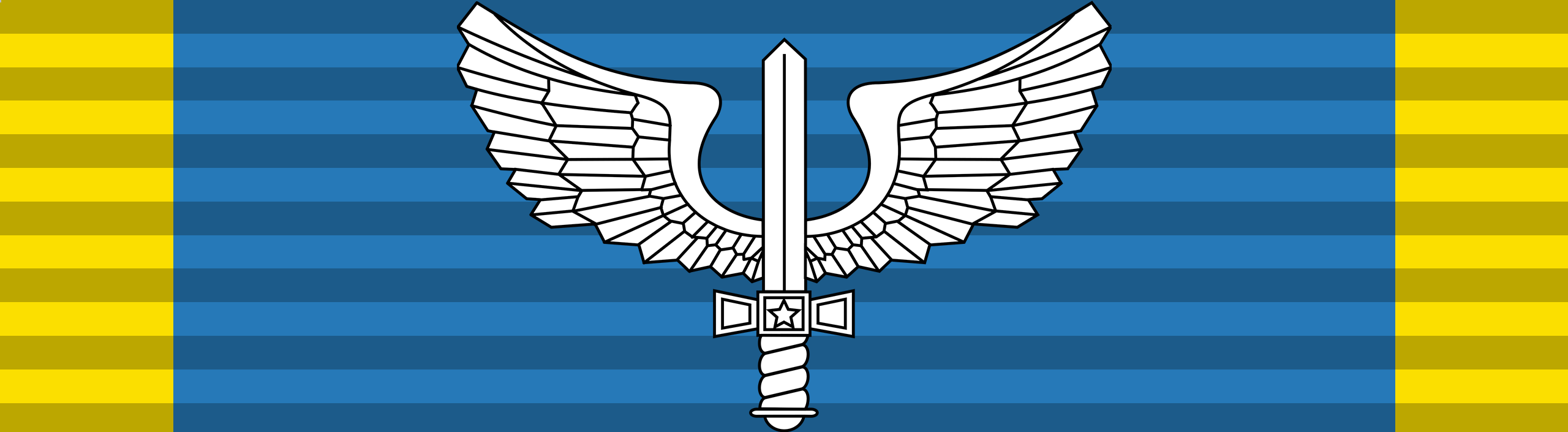
- Santos-Dumont Merit Medal

== Notes ==
Military offices
Preceded by Antonio Carlos Moretti Bermudez	Commander of the Brazilian Air Force; 2021–2023	Succeeded by Marcelo Kanitz Damasceno
