= Antonio Carlos Moretti Bermudez =

Brazilian military

Lieutenant-Brigadier Antonio Carlos Bermudez

Commander of the Brazilian Air Force
- In office 4 January 2019 – 30 March 2021
- President: Jair Bolsonaro
- Minister: Fernando Azevedo e Silva
- Preceded by: Nivaldo Luiz Rossato
- Succeeded by: Carlos de Almeida Baptista Júnior

Personal details
- Born: Antonio Carlos Moretti Bermudez; 9 February 1956 (age 70) Santo Ângelo, Rio Grande do Sul, Brazil
- Spouse: Eliana Fereira
- Children: 3

Military service
- Allegiance: Brazil
- Branch/service: Brazilian Air Force
- Years of service: 1975–present
- Rank: Lieutenant-Brigadier
- Commands: 1st/16th Group of Aviation; Command Squad of Anápolis Air Base; Sub-section of Operational Research; Research and Planning Division; Defence and Aeronautical Attaché to the Embassy of Brazil in Paris and Brussels; Center of Social Communication of the Aeronautic; Brasília Air Base; 3rd Air Force; 6th Regional Air Command; 1st Air Defence Group; General Command of Air Operations

Antonio Carlos Moretti Bermudez (born 9 February 1956 in Santo Ângelo) is a Brazilian military, Lieutenant-Brigadier of the Air, former Commander of the Brazilian Air Force. Bermudez became Commander in January 2019, replacing Nivaldo Rossato.

== Personal life ==
Born in Santo Ângelo, in the state of Rio Grande do Sul, Bermudez is married to Eliana Ferreira and they have 3 children: Gabriel, Laís and André. His parents are Hyppólito Antonio Vijande Bermudez and Anna Maria Moretti Bermudez.

== Dates of rank ==
Promotions
Rank	Date
Aspirant	12 December 1978
2nd Lieutenant	31 August 1979
1st Lieutenant	31 August 1981
Captain	31 August 1984
Major	25 December 1988
Lieutenant Colonel	30 April 1995
Colonel	31 August 2000
Brigadier of the Air	31 March 2007
Major-Brigadier of the Air	31 March 2010
Lieutenant-Brigadier of the Air	25 November 2014

Military offices
Preceded by Nivaldo Rossato	Commander of the Brazilian Air Force; 2019–21	Succeeded by Carlos de Almeida Baptista Júnior
