= Sylvio Frota =

Brazilian army general

Minister of the Army
- In office 27 May 1974 – 12 October 1977
- President: Ernesto Geisel
- Preceded by: Vicente de Paulo Dale Coutinho
- Succeeded by: Fernando Belfort Bethlem

Chief of the Army General Staff
- In office 19 April 1974 – 28 May 1974
- President: Ernesto Geisel
- Preceded by: Vicente de Paulo Dale Coutinho
- Succeeded by: Fritz Azevedo Couto

Personal details
- Born: Sylvio Couto Coelho da Frota; 26 August 1910 Rio de Janeiro, Federal District, Brazil
- Died: 23 October 1996 (aged 86) Rio de Janeiro, Rio de Janeiro, Brazil
- Resting place: Caju Cemetery, Rio de Janeiro, Rio de Janeiro, Brazil
- Spouse: Ídia Pragana da Frota
- Children: Two
- Relatives: Alexandre Frota (great-nephew)
- Education: Military School of Realengo

Military service
- Allegiance: Brazil
- Branch/service: Brazilian Army
- Rank: Army general
- Commands: See list: Salvador Reserve Officer Training Centre; General Staff of the Armored Division; 4th Cavalry Division; Armored Division; Chief of Staff of the Minister of the Army; 1st Military Region; Eastern Military Command
- Battles/wars: Brazilian communist uprising of 1935; 1964 Brazilian coup d'état

Sylvio Couto Coelho da Frota (26 August 1910 – 23 October 1996) was a Brazilian army general and minister of the Army during the Ernesto Geisel government.

== Biography ==
Sylvio Frota studied at Colégio Pedro II. In 1928 he entered the Military School of Realengo.

He married Ídia Pragana da Frota. Frota had two children, one of them being Navy officer Luís Pragana da Frota. He is great-uncle of Alexandre Frota.

On 20 December 1977, Frota was awarded the Grand Cross of the Military Order of Avis of Portugal.

Frota was Roman Catholic.

=== Military career ===
In August 1934 he was promoted to first lieutenant. In June 1948 Frota was promoted to major. In September 1952 to lieutenant colonel.

In 1955 Frota went against Marshal Lott's 11 November movement.

In April 1960 Frota was promoted to colonel.

In Jânio Quadros' resignation in 1960 he allied himself with the generals against the rise of João Goulart: Marshal Odílio Denis, Admiral Silvio Heck, and Brigadier Gabriel Grün Moss.

Frota participated and supported the 1964 coup. A few months later, in November, he was promoted to brigadier general.

Three years later, in 1967, he was the chief of staff of Army Minister Aurélio de Lira Tavares. Frota helped form the Army Information Center (CIE).

In March 1969 he was promoted to division general and commanded the 1st Military Region, in Rio de Janeiro, between 27 February 1969 and 25 July 1972.

In July 1972 Frota was promoted to army general. and assumed command of the Eastern Military Command, replacing General João Bina Machado. He remained in that position between 25 July 1972 and 5 April 1974.

With Ernesto Geisel's inauguration on 15 March 1974, he was appointed Chief of the Army General Staff on 19 April, where he remained for a short time, until 28 May of that year.

=== Army Minister ===
Sylvio Frota assumed the Ministry of the Army on 27 May 1974, after the death of the portfolio holder, General Vicente de Paulo Dale Coutinho.

As an extreme anti-communist, Frota represented the hardline of the Brazilian military regime.

The death of worker Manuel Fiel Filho in January 1976, shortly after the death of journalist Vladimir Herzog, caused much opposition and friction with President Geisel. The president removes Ednardo D'Ávila Melo, Silvio's ally, from the command of the Southeastern Military Command.

=== Candidacy for the presidency ===
In 1977, Sylvio Frota intended to run for president, against the wishes of Geisel, who declares that he would only consider the matter in January 1978. Geisel's preference was for General João Baptista de Oliveira Figueiredo.

In early August 1977, deputy Carlos Alberto de Oliveira threatened to launch the Frota candidacy.

On 23 August, Geisel asked to approve a text that Frota had prepared to commemorate Soldier's Day; the unusual request generated friction.

On 8 September, Frota threatened the journalist Lourenço Diaféria who praised the heroism of Silvio Hollembach against the figure of Duque de Caxias, patron of the army.

On 4 October, General Jaime Portela, an ally of Costa e Silva and the regime's hard line, visited the capital to encourage support for "frotismo", support for the Frota candidacy.

=== Resignation on 12 October 1977 ===
On 10 October, Geisel announced to his closest allies, generals Golbery do Couto e Silva and Hugo Abreu, that he would fire Sylvio Frota within two days, when it would be a holiday in Brasilia. It would be the first exoneration of an army minister since 1964.

Golbery and Hugo Abreu instructed the Official Gazette to operate during the holiday.

The next day, on 11 October, Geisel informed the commanders of the four armies of his decision.

On 12 October 1977, Geisel received Sylvio Frota. The resignation was published in the Official Gazette as well as the appointment of Fernando Belfort Bethlem, ex-commander of the Southern Military Command, as successor.

Sylvio Frota prepared an eight-page text to be distributed to all units of the army, which is not done.

After his dismissal, feeling ideologically upset, he withdraws from political life, despite demonstrations in favor of his candidacy, with the support of military leaders such as Marshal Odílio Denys, Admiral Augusto Rademaker and Brigadier Márcio de Sousa Melo.

=== Amnesty Act of 29 August 1979 ===
In 1979, after the enactment of the Amnesty Law, Frota returned to the news as a sharp critic of the measure. He released a controversial list of alleged communists infiltrated as civil servants.

After that, he avoided further public pronouncements until he died in 1996.

== Sources ==
- AA.VV. - Dicionário Histórico-Biográfico Brasileiro. Rio de Janeiro: CPDOC, Fundação Getúlio Vargas
- FROTA, Sylvio - Ideais traídos. Rio de Janeiro: Jorge Zahar Editor, 2006. ISBN 8571109044
- GASPARI, Elio - A ditadura encurralada. São Paulo: Companhia da Letras, 2004 ISBN 85-359-0509-X
