= Pompeia, São Paulo =

Pompeia
- Municipality
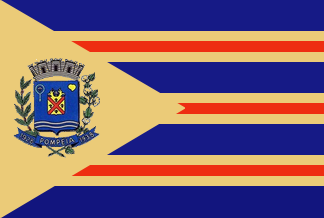
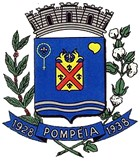
- Flag Coat of arms

- Location in São Paulo state

- Location in Brazil
- Coordinates: 22°06′31″S 50°10′18″W
- Country: Brazil
- Region: Southeast
- State: São Paulo

Government
  - Mayor: Tina Januário (PTB)

Area
  - Total: 784 km^{2} (303 sq mi)
- Elevation: 597 m (1,959 ft)

Population (2020)
  - Total: 22,172
  - Density: 28.3/km^{2} (73.2/sq mi)
- Time zone: UTC-03:00 (BRT)
  - Summer (DST): UTC-02:00 (BRST)
- Website: www.pompeia.sp.gov.br

Pompeia (before AO 1990: Pompéia) is a municipality in the state of São Paulo in Brazil. The population is 22,172 (2020) within an area of 784 km^{2}. In 2000, its Human Development Index was 0.816.

== History ==
The region of Pompeia was originally inhabited by Kaingang natives, called Coroados ("Crowned") by the Portuguese colonizers. The first settlers arrived in 1852, when the Imperial Government granted João Antonio de Moraes, Francisco de Paula Morais and Francisco Rodrigues de Campos occupancy over the lands in the surroundings of Rio do Peixe and Aguapeí River (São Paulo).

In 1919, Júlio da Costa Barros purchased a share of Guataporanga farm for agricultural purposes. In the following three years, the first Coffea plantations started to grow. Later on, abiding by a condition from Guataporanga Farm's landowner, Barros founded Vila de Novo Cravinhos, name given after Cravinhos, where the first customers of theirs came from. The clear-cutting nearby started along with the construction of former Noroeste do Brasil Railroad in order to link the cities of Bauru (São Paulo) and Corumbá (Mato Grosso do Sul).

Jacutinga Farm was the first to arise in the environs. Its landowner Rodolfo Lara Campos acquired it in order to grow Coffea large-scale profit crops and started the deforestation of the region where later the city of Pompeia would be established. In 1928, Rodolfo and Luiz Miranda planned the foundation of a city and commanded the cutting of a 250 hectare area, which was named Patrimônio de Otomânia ("Otomânia's Patrimony) and after being divided into lots the first of those began to be sold. A few years later, Patrimônio was officially renamed Pompeia after senator Rodolfo Miranda's wife, Aretuza Pompeia.

The municipality was created by state law in 1938.

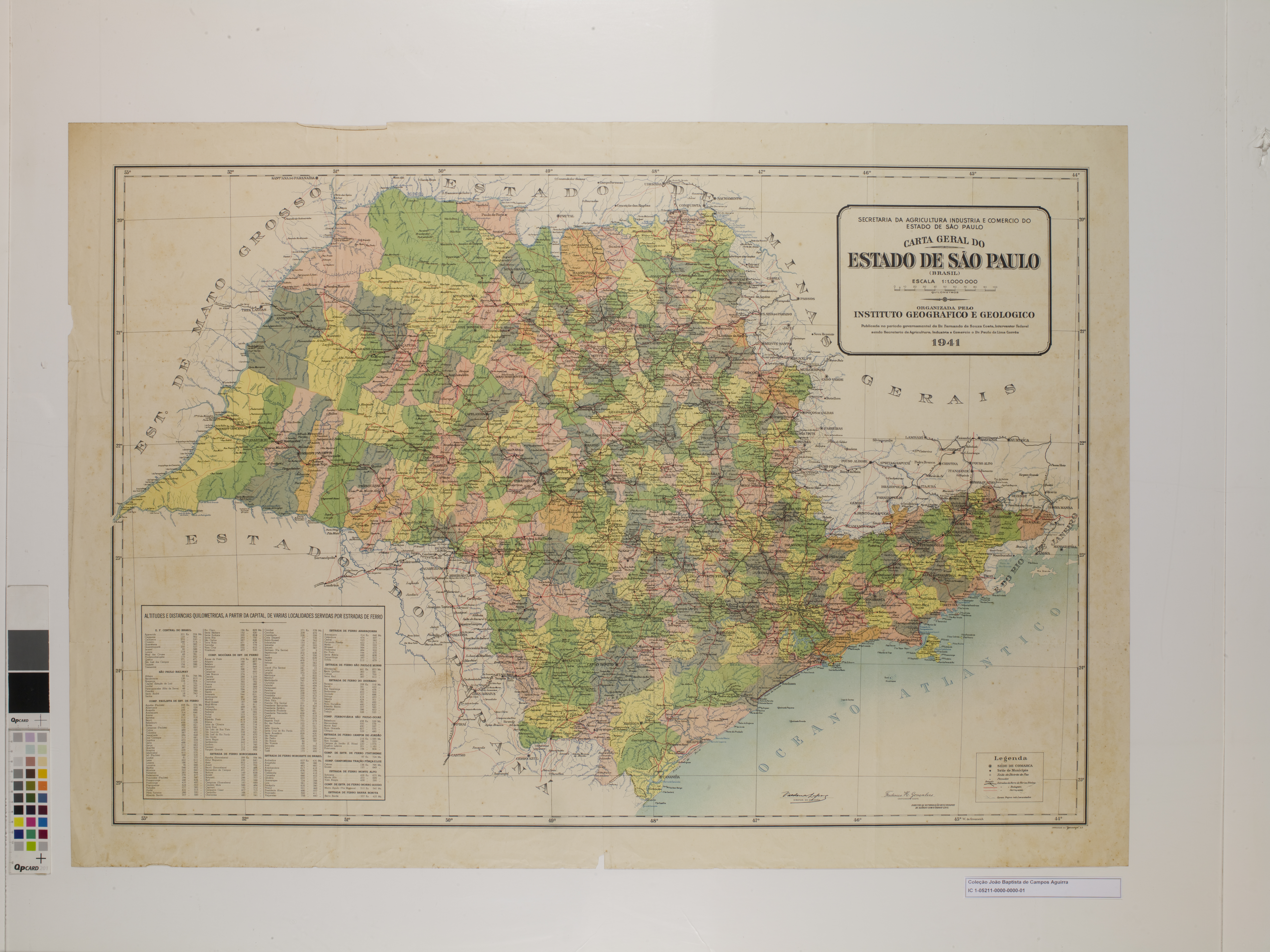
Map of the state of São Paulo (1938).

As several cities of the state of São Paulo, Pompeia was majorly populated by Portuguese, Italian and Japanese immigrants. The latter's culture even nowadays is still remarkable in traditional festivities and the architectural design of the city, e.g. many bus stops have roofs with eaves curved.

== Demographics ==
Historical population (municipality)
Year	Population	%±
1940	55,390	—
1950	39,398	−28.9%
1960	37,826	−4.0%
1970	17,877	−52.7%
1980	16,261	−9.0%
1991	17,236	6.0%
2000	18,171	5.4%
2010	19,964	9.9%
2022	20,196	1.2%

== Education ==
Pompeia has become a reference in Education within the state of São Paulo and also in nationwide indicators. It was listed as one of the 500 cities that offer more educational opportunitites in Brazil. Since 2013, Shunji Nishimura Foundation of Technology has collaborated with Faculdade de Tecnologia offering graduation courses of Mechanization of Precision Agriculture and Big Data in Agribusiness, which has contributed to transform the city into a new hub for higher education.

== Máquinas Agrícolas Jacto ==
In 1948, the Jacto Group was founded in the city by Japanese immigrant Shunji Nishimura, who arrived in Brazil in 1932. Graduated at Kyoto City First Technical School, Nishimura and his family developed agricultural fixing equipment which gradatively gained more popularity among farmers and agricultural families in the countryside of not only São Paulo but also other states of Brazil.

The company has been one of the top earners of the city and a major revenue stream of the Midwestern state of São Paulo. The Nishimura family was also responsible for the Shunji Nishimura Foundation of Technology, created to provide farmers testing services to determine soil fertility and analyze plant tissues, as well as working on continuous technological improvement in rural areas.

== Media ==
In telecommunications, the city was served by Companhia Telefônica Brasileira until 1973, when it began to be served by Telecomunicações de São Paulo. In July 1998, this company was acquired by Telefónica, which adopted the Vivo brand in 2012.

The company is currently an operator of cell phones, fixed lines, internet (fiber optics/4G) and television (satellite and cable).

== Religion ==
Christianity is present in the city as follows:

=== Catholic Church ===
The Catholic church in the municipality is part of the Roman Catholic Diocese of Marília.

=== Protestant Church ===
The most diverse evangelical beliefs are present in the city, mainly Pentecostal, including the Assemblies of God in Brazil (the largest evangelical church in the country), Christian Congregation in Brazil, among others. These denominations are growing more and more throughout Brazil.

== See also ==
- List of municipalities in São Paulo
