= Southeastern Military Command (Brazil) =

Area command of the Brazilian Army

The Southeastern Military Command (Portuguese: Comando Militar do Sudeste or CMSE) is one of eight Military Commands of the Brazilian Army. It is responsible for the defence of the state of São Paulo.

== Structure ==
Area of the Comando Militar do Sudeste 2017

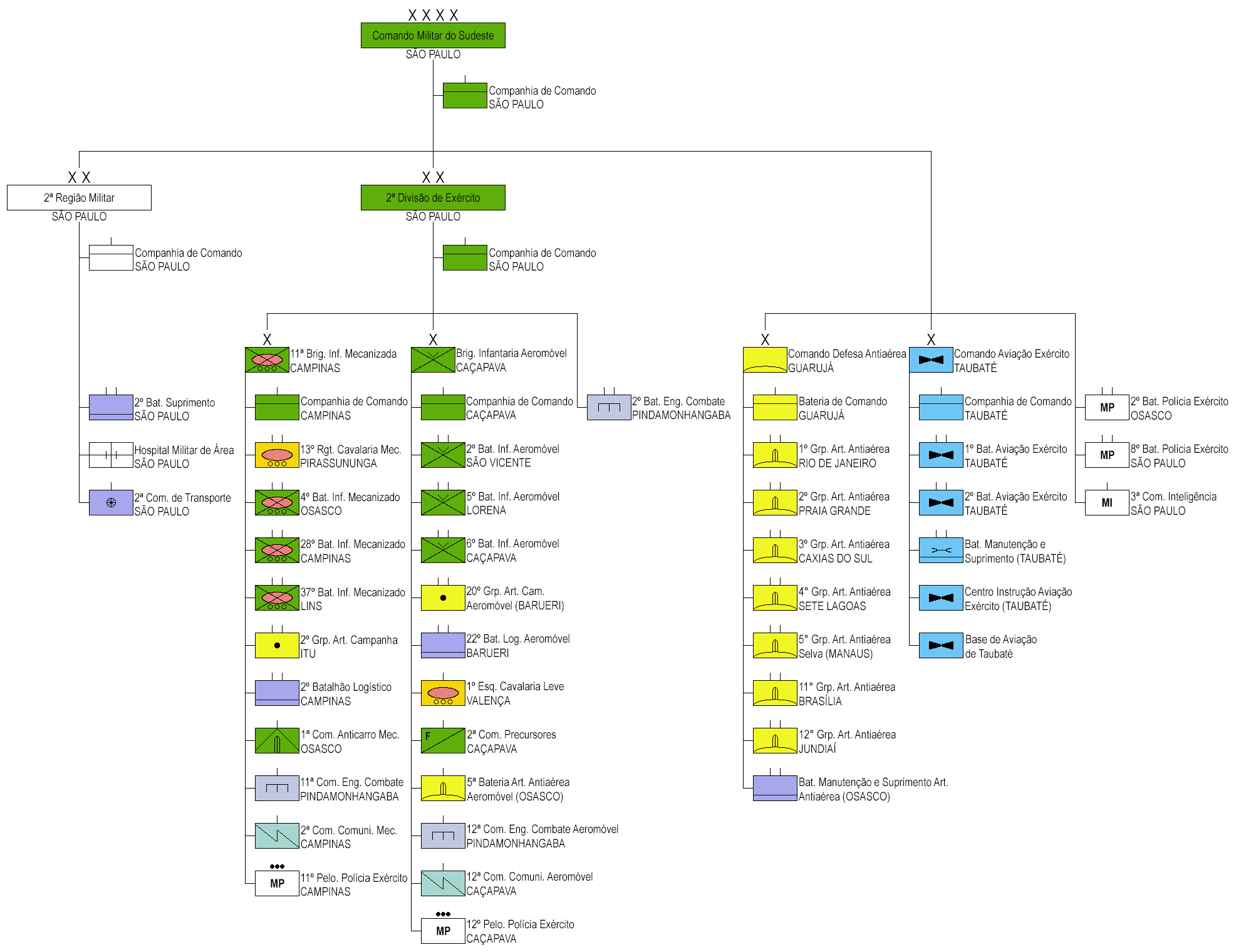
Structure of the Comando Militar do Sudeste 2024 (click to enlarge)

- Southeastern Military Command (Comando Militar do Sudeste) in São Paulo
  - HQ Company Southeastern Military Command (Companhia de Comando do Comando Militar do Sudeste) in São Paulo
  - 2nd Military Police Battalion (2º Batalhão de Polícia do Exército) in Osasco
  - 8th Military Police Battalion (8º Batalhão de Polícia do Exército) in São Paulo
  - 3rd Military Intelligence Company (3ª Companhia de Inteligência) in São Paulo
  - 2nd Military Region (2ª Região Militar) in São Paulo
    - HQ Company 2nd Military Region (Companhia de Comando do 2ª Região Militar) in São Paulo
    - 2nd Supplies Batalion (2º Batalhão de Suprimentos) in São Paulo
    - São Paulo Military Area Hospital (Hospital Militar de Área de São Paulo) in São Paulo
    - 2nd Transport Company (2ª Companhia de Transporte) in São Paulo
    - Regional Works Commission of the 2nd Military Region (Comissão Regional de Obras da 2ª Região Militar), in São Paulo
    - Ibirapuera Administration and Support Base (Base de Administração e Apoio do Ibirapuera) in São Paulo
    - Ribeirão Preto Regional Support Base (Base de Apoio Regional de Ribeirão Preto), in Ribeirão Preto
    - Bauru Regional Support Base (Base de Apoio Regional de Bauru), in Bauru
    - Sorocaba Regional Support Base (Base de Apoio Regional de Ribeirão Preto), in Sorocaba
  - Army Aviation Command (Comando de Aviação do Exército) in Taubaté
    - HQ Company Army Aviation Command (Companhia de Comando do Comando de Aviação do Exército) in Taubaté
    - 1st Army Aviation Battalion (1º Batalhão de Aviação do Exército) in Taubaté
    - 2nd Army Aviation Battalion (2º Batalhão de Aviação do Exército) in Taubaté
    - Army Aviation Maintenance and Supply Battalion (Batalhão de Manutenção e Suprimento de Aviação do Exército) in Taubaté
    - Army Aviation Signals Company (Companhia de Comunicações de Aviação do Exército) in Taubaté
    - Army Aviation Instruction Center (Centro de Instrução de Aviação do Exército) in Taubaté
    - Taubaté Aviation Base (Base de Aviação de Taubaté) in Taubaté
  - Army Air Defence Command (Comando de Defesa Anti-Aérea do Exército) in Guarujá
    - HQ Battery 1st Air Defence Artillery Brigade (Bateria Comando 1ª Brigada de Artilharia Anti-Aérea) in Guarujá
    - 1st Air Defence Artillery Group (1º Grupo de Artilharia Antiaérea) in Rio de Janeiro
    - 2nd Air Defence Artillery Group (2º Grupo de Artilharia Antiaérea) in Praia Grande
    - 3rd Air Defence Artillery Group (3º Grupo de Artilharia Antiaérea) in Caxias do Sul
    - 4th Air Defence Artillery Group (4° Grupo de Artilharia Antiaérea) in Sete Lagoas
    - 5th Jungle Air Defence Artillery Group (5° Grupo de Artilharia Antiaérea de Selva), in Manaus
    - 11th Air Defence Artillery Group (11° Grupo de Artilharia Antiaérea) in Brasília
    - 12th Air Defence Artillery Group (12° Grupo de Artilharia Antiaérea), in Jundiaí
    - Anti-Aircraft Artillery Maintenance and Supply Battalion (Batalhão de Manutenção e Suprimento de Artilharia Antiaérea) in Osasco
  - 2nd Army Division (2ª Divisão de Exército) in São Paulo
    - HQ Company 2nd Army Division (Companhia de Comando do 2ª Divisão de Exército) in São Paulo
    - 2nd Combat Engineer Batallion (2° Batalhão de engenharia de Combate) in Piracicaba
      - 11th Mechanized Infantry Brigade (11ª Brigada de Infantaria Mecanizada)) in Campinas
        - HQ Company 11th Light Infantry Brigade (Companhia de Comando da 11ª Brigada de Infantaria Leve) in Campinas
        - 4th Mechanized Infantry Battalion (4º Batalhão de Infantaria Mecanizado), in Osasco
        - 13th Mechanized Cavalry Regiment (13º Regimento de Cavalaria Mecanizado) in Pirassununga
        - 2nd Light Infantry Battalion (2º Batalhão de Infantaria Leve) in São Vicente
        - 28th Mechanized Infantry Battalion (28º Batalhão de Infantaria Mecanizado) in Campinas
        - 37th Mechanized Infantry Battalion (37º Batalhão de Infantaria Mecanizado) in Lins
        - 2nd Field Artillery Group (2º Grupo de Artilharia de Campanha) in Itu
        - 2nd Logistics Battalion (2º Batalhão Logístico ) in Campinas
        - 11th Mechanized Combat Engineer Company (11ª Companhia de Engenharia de Combate Mecanizada) in Pindamonhangaba
        - 2nd Mechanized Signals Company (2ª Companhia de Comunicações Mecanizada) in Campinas
        - 11th Military Police Platoon (11º Pelotão de Polícia do Exército) in Campinas
        - 1st Mechanized Anti-tank Company (1ª Companhia Anti-Carro Mecanizada), in Osasco
      - Airmobile Infantry Brigade (Brigada de Infantaria Aeromóvel) in Caçapava
        - HQ Company Airmobile Infantry Brigade (Companhia de Comando da Brigada de Infantaria Aeromóvel) in Caçapava
        - 2nd Airmobile Infantry Battalion (4º Batalhão de Infantaria Aeromóvel) in Osasco
        - 5th Airmobile Infantry Battalion (5º Batalhão de Infantaria Aeromóvel) in Lorena
        - 6th Airmobile Infantry Battalion (6º Batalhão de Infantaria Aeromóvel) in Caçapava
        - 20th Airmobile Field Artillery Group (20º Grupo de Artilharia de Campanha Aeromóvel) in Barueri
        - 22nd Airmobile Logistics Battalion (22º Batalhão Logístico Aeromóvel) in Barueri
        - 1st Airmobile Cavalry Squadron (1º Esquadrão de Cavalaria Aeromóvel) in Valença
        - 12th Airmobile Combat Engineer Company (12ª Companhia de Engenharia de Combate Aeromóvel) in Pindamonhangaba
        - 5th Airmobile Anti-air Artillery Battery (5ª Bateria de Artilharia Anti-Aérea Aeromóvel) in Osasco
        - 12th Airmobile Signals Company (12ª Companhia de Comunicações Aeromóvel) in Caçapava
        - 12th Military Police Platoon (12º Pelotão de Polícia do Exército) in Caçapava
        - 2nd Pathfinders Company (2ª Companhia de Precursores) in Caçapava
