= Joint Chiefs of Staff of the Armed Forces =

- Estado-Maior Conjunto das Forças Armadas
- Badge of EMCFA
- Founded: 2010
- Country: Brazil
- Part of: Ministry of Defence
- Garrison/HQ: Brasília, Brazil
- Website: Official website

Commanders
- Chief of the Joint Chiefs of Staff: Admiral Renato de Aguiar Freire
- Minister of Defence: José Múcio

Insignia
- Flag

The Joint Chiefs of Staff of the Armed Forces (Portuguese: Estado-Maior Conjunto das Forças Armadas; EMCFA) is a joint military staff of the Ministry of Defence, responsible for strategic coordination of the Brazilian Armed Forces.

== History ==
The origin of Brazil’s joint military command structure dates back to the General Staff of the Armed Forces (EMFA), which was established in 1946. The EMFA was created to provide strategic coordination among the Army, Navy, and Air Force, particularly in planning, doctrine, and national defense policy, while each service retained operational independence.

Its influence varied over time and was especially prominent during Brazil’s military government (1964–1985), when senior officers played a central role in national decision-making. Despite its name, the EMFA did not exercise unified command authority over the armed forces and remained limited by strong service autonomy.

In 1999, Brazil established the Ministry of Defence, replacing the separate service ministries and placing the armed forces under unified civilian leadership. This reform reduced the political role of the EMFA and highlighted the need for a more modern joint military staff aligned with international standards.

As part of broader defense reforms, the EMFA was formally dissolved in 2010 and replaced by the Joint Chiefs of Staff of the Armed Forces (EMCFA), following the enactment of Complementary Law No. 136 (2010). The EMCFA inherited many of the EMFA’s strategic planning functions, but it was designed with a stronger emphasis on joint operations, interoperability, logistics integration, military education, and strategic advisory roles.

== List of chiefs ==
No.	Portrait	Chief of the Joint Staff	Took office	Left office	Time in office	Defence branch	Ref.
1	José Carlos De Nardi	General; José Carlos De Nardi (born 1944)	6 September 2010	7 December 2015	5 years, 92 days	Army	
2	Ademir Sobrinho	Admiral; Ademir Sobrinho (born 1952)	7 December 2015	19 January 2019	3 years, 43 days	Navy	
3	Raul Botelho	Lieutenant-brigadier; Raul Botelho (born 1957)	19 January 2019	31 May 2021	2 years, 132 days	Air Force	
4	Laerte de Souza Santos	General; Laerte de Souza Santos (born 1958)	31 May 2021	31 December 2022	1 year, 214 days	Army	
5	Renato Rodrigues de Aguiar Freire	Admiral; Renato Rodrigues de Aguiar Freire (born 1960)	1 January 2023	Incumbent	2 years, 353 days	Navy	
