= Almir Garnier Santos =

Commander of the Brazilian Navy

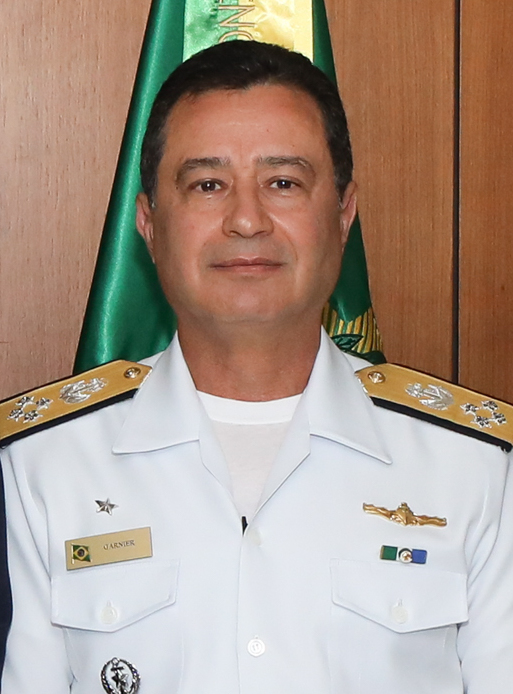

Commander of the Brazilian Navy
- In office 31 March 2021 – 5 January 2023
- President: Jair Bolsonaro
- Minister: Walter Braga Netto; Paulo Sérgio Nogueira
- Preceded by: Ilques Barbosa Junior
- Succeeded by: Marcos Sampaio Olsen

Personal details
- Born: 22 September 1960 (age 66) Rio de Janeiro, Guanabara, Brazil

Military service
- Allegiance: Brazil
- Branch/service: Brazilian Navy
- Years of service: 1978−present
- Rank: Admiral of the fleet
- Criminal information
- Status: In prison
- Convictions: Attempted violent abolition of the democratic rule of law; Attempted coup d'état; Participation in an armed criminal organization; Qualified damage; Deterioration of protected heritage property
- Trial: Trial for the 2022–2023 Brazilian coup plot (8 – 11 September 2025)
- Penalty: 24 years in prison

Details
- Date apprehended: 25 November 2025
- Imprisoned at: Navy Radio Station; Brasília, Federal District

Almir Garnier Santos (Note: Portuguese pronunciation: [awˈmi(ʁ) ɡaʁ.niˈeʁ ˈsɐ̃.tus]) (born 22 September 1960 in Rio de Janeiro) is a Brazilian Admiral, former Commander of the Brazilian Navy from 2021 to 2023. On 11 September 2025, he was sentenced to 24 years in prison by the Supreme Federal Court for his involvement in the attempted coup to revert the results of the 2022 elections and maintain then-President Jair Bolsonaro in power.

== Career ==
Garnier was General-Secretary of the Ministry of Defence, the second highest office in the department. He concluded his studies at the Navy School in 1981, as the first in the Armada Corp.

As Lieutenant, he served the União and Independência frigates and the Training Ship Brasil. According to the Ministry, Garnier is Master in Operational Research and System Analysis at the Naval Postgraduate School, in the United States, MBA in International Management at the Federal University of Rio de Janeiro (UFRJ) and course of Politics and Maritime Strategy at the Naval War School for two years.

Garnier commanded the tanker Almirante Gastão Motta, the Center for Support of Operational Systems, the Naval Systems Analysis Center, the Naval War School and the 2nd Naval District in Salvador, Bahia.

Admiral Garnier worked in the Ministry of Defence from June 2014 to January 2017 as the ministry's special military advisor, advising former ministers Celso Amorim, Jaques Wagner, Aldo Rebelo and Raul Jungmann.

As Admiral of the Fleet, he had served as Secretary-General of the Ministry of Defence during the administration of minister Fernando Azevedo e Silva, until 9 April 2021, when he assumed office as Commander of the Brazilian Navy.

== Investigation for coup plotting ==
According to an accusation made by Mauro Cid, aide-de-camp of former president Jair Bolsonaro, Garnier Santos would have accepted to participate in a coup d'état to remove justices of the Superior Electoral Court and the Supreme Federal Court and overthrow the Brazilian democracy in 2022. Former Brazilian Air Force commander Carlos Baptista Júnior also testified that Garnier told Bolsonaro he would put his troops at his disposal, and commented: "If the [ Army ] commander [ Freire Gomes ] had agreed, possibly, a coup d'etat attempt would have taken place."

Garnier Santos was removed from office on January 5, 2023 after President Lula took office. On February 8, 2024, the Federal Police launched Operation Tempus Veritatis to investigate a criminal organization involved in the attempted coup d'état and the abolition of the Democratic Rule of Law, aiming to gain political advantage by keeping the then-president of the Republic in power. Garnier Santos was one of the 33 targets of search and seizure.

== Dates of rank ==
Promotions
Rank	Date
Midshipman	13 December 1981
Second lieutenant	31 August 1982
First lieutenant	31 August 1984
Captain lieutenant	31 August 1987
Corvette captain	31 August 1993
Frigate captain	30 April 1999
Captain of sea and war	25 December 2004
Rear admiral	31 March 2010
Vice admiral	31 March 2014
Admiral of the fleet	25 November 2018

== Notes ==
Military offices
Preceded by Ilques Barbosa Junior	Commander of the Brazilian Navy; 2021–2023	Succeeded by Marcos Sampaio Olsen
