= Alfredo Karam =

Brazilian naval officer and politician (1925–2024)

Commander of the Brazilian Navy
- In office 21 March 1984 – 15 March 1985
- Preceded by: Maximiano Eduardo da Silva Fonseca
- Succeeded by: Henrique Saboia

Personal details
- Born: 28 March 1925 Rio de Janeiro, Brazil
- Died: 6 September 2024 (aged 99) Rio de Janeiro, Brazil
- Education: Naval School; Basic Enlisted Submarine School
- Occupation: Naval officer

Alfredo Karam (28 March 1925 – 6 September 2024) was a Brazilian military officer and politician. He served as Commander of the Brazilian Navy from 1984 to 1985. He was also the father of the late actor Guilherme Karan.

Karam died in Rio de Janeiro on 6 September 2024, at the age of 99.

== See also ==
- Brazilian submarine Almirante Karam
