= Ilques Barbosa Junior =

Brazilian naval officer

Admiral Ilques Barbosa Junior
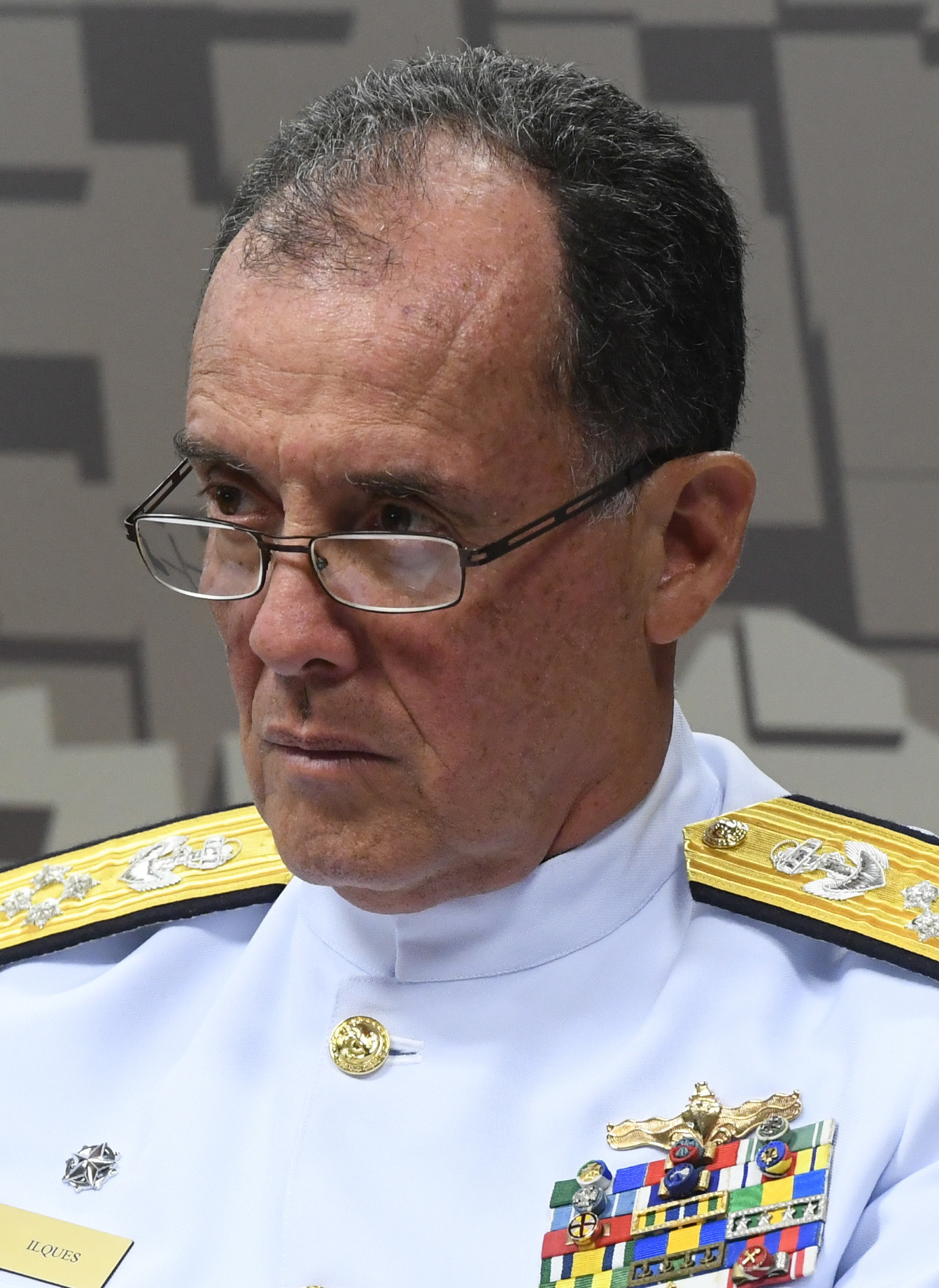

Commander of the Brazilian Navy
- In office 9 January 2019 – 30 March 2021
- President: Jair Bolsonaro
- Minister: Fernando Azevedo e Silva
- Preceded by: Eduardo Bacellar Leal
- Succeeded by: Almir Garnier Santos

Personal details
- Born: Ilques Barbosa Junior; 29 May 1954 (age 71) Ribeirão Preto, São Paulo, Brazil
- Spouse: Leoniza Neves
- Children: 2

Military service
- Allegiance: Brazil
- Branch/service: Brazilian Navy
- Years of service: 1976−present
- Rank: Admiral of the fleet

Ilques Barbosa Junior (born 29 May 1954 in Ribeirão Preto) is a Brazilian Admiral of the Fleet, former Chief of General Staff and Commander of the Navy from January 2019 to March 2021.

He is married to Leoniza Neves de Aguiar e Sousa Barbosa and has two daughters: Larissa and Christina.

== Career ==
Admiral Ilques has a long career in the Brazilian Navy. He was Midshipman, 2nd Lieutenant, 1st Lieutenant, Captain Lieutenant, Corvette Captain, Frigate Captain, Captain of Sea and War, Counter Admiral, Vice Admiral and Admiral of the Fleet.

He was admitted at Naval School and had classes of Improvement of Communication for Officials, Basic Classes, Command and Staff, Superior Classes, Regular Classes of Staff in Academy of Naval War - Chile Army, Maritime Politics and Strategies Classes, High Studies of Politics and Strategies in Superior School of War.

== Military awards ==
- Order of Defence Merit (Grand Cross) (Note: Portuguese: Ordem do Mérito da Defesa - Grã-Cruz)
- Order of Naval Merit (Grand Cross) (Note: Portuguese: Ordem do Mérito Naval - Grã-Cruz)
- Order of Military Merit (Grand Officer - Grande-Oficial)
- Order of Aeronautical Merit (Grand Officer) (Note: Portuguese: Ordem do Mérito Aeronáutico - Grande-Oficial)
- Order of Rio Branco (Grand Cross)
- Order of Military Judiciary Merit (Grand Officer)

== Notes ==
Military offices
Preceded by Eduardo Bacellar Leal	Commander of the Brazilian Navy; 2019−2021	Succeeded by Almir Garnier Santos
