= Marcos Sampaio Olsen =

Brazilian Admiral

Admiral Marcos Sampaio Olsen
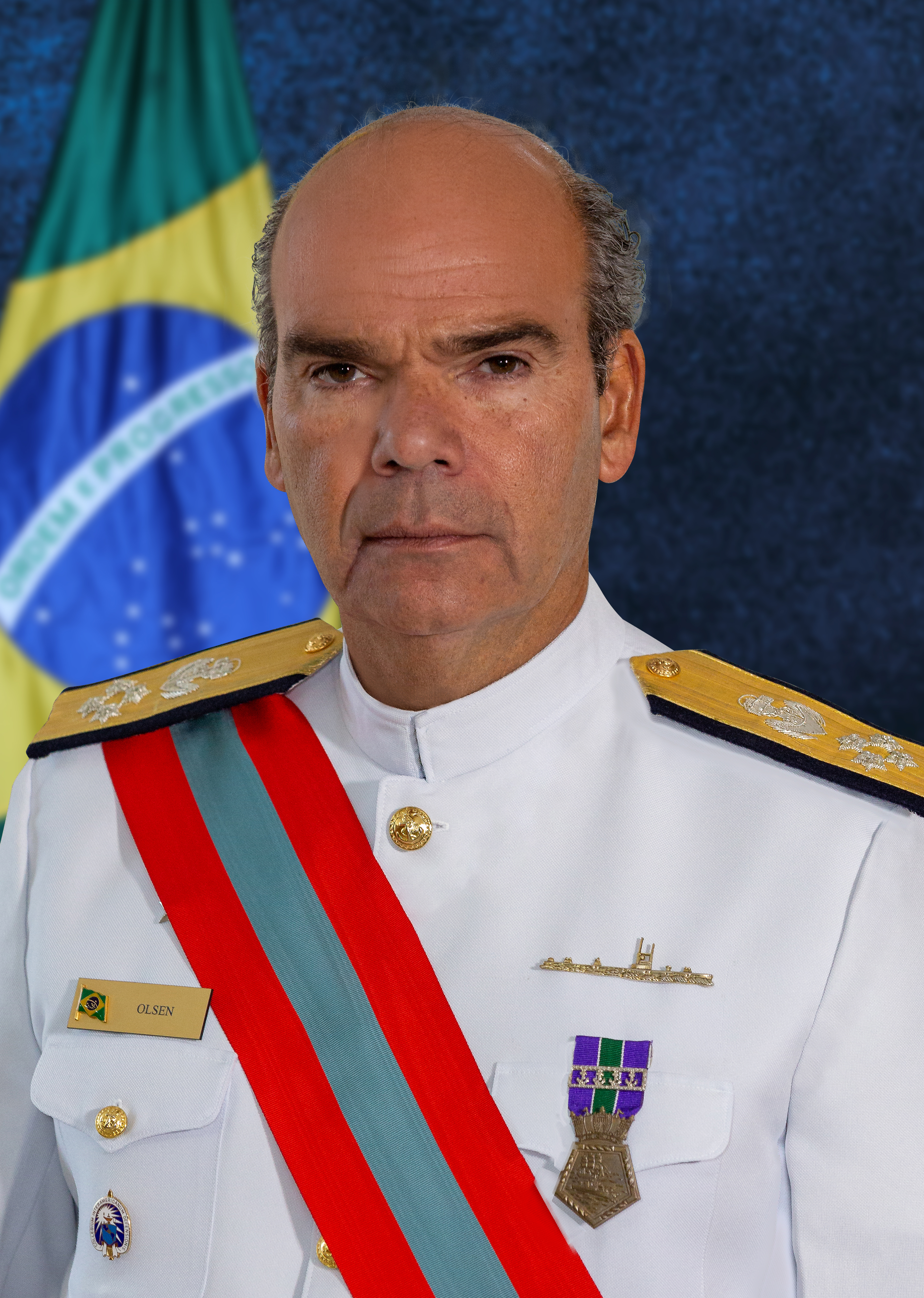

Commander of the Brazilian Navy
- Incumbent
- Assumed office 5 January 2023
- President: Luiz Inácio Lula da Silva
- Minister: José Múcio
- Preceded by: Almir Garnier Santos

Personal details
- Born: 8 March 1961 (age 65) Ceará, Brazil

Military service
- Allegiance: Brazil
- Branch/service: Brazilian Navy
- Years of service: 1979–present
- Rank: Admiral

Marcos Sampaio Olsen (born 8 March 1961) is a Brazilian navy admiral, incumbent Brazilian Navy Commander. He joined the military career in 1979 and was declared Midshipman in 1982. Olsen acted as commander of minesweeper NV Atalaia (M-17) and submarine S Tapajó and as executive officer of submarine S Tamoio and aircraft carrier NAe São Paulo.

In 2011, Olsen was promoted to Rear Admiral and assumed many offices in the Navy. In December 2017, Olsen was responsible of the General Management of Nuclear and Technological Development of the Navy, responsible for planning and coordination of all activities related to the development of nuclear technology.

On 30 December 2022, then Brazilian president Jair Bolsonaro nominated Olsen as Navy Commander, officialized on 5 January 2023 by president Luiz Inácio Lula da Silva.

Military offices
Preceded by Almir Garnier Santos	Commander of the Brazilian Navy; 2023–present	Incumbent
Order of precedence
Preceded by Alessandro Moretti as Director of the Brazilian Intelligence Agency	Brazilian order of precedence as Commander of the Brazilian Navy	Followed by Tomás Ribeiro Paiva as Commander of the Brazilian Army
