= Commander of the Brazilian Navy =

- Comandante da Marinha
- Coat of arms of the Navy

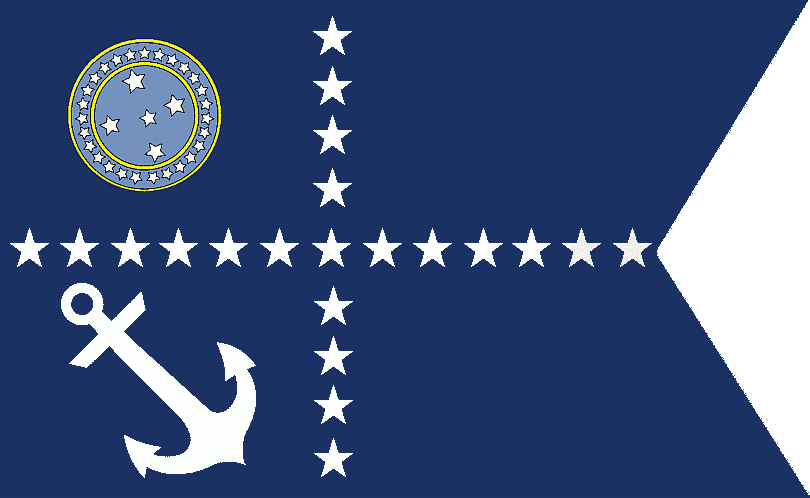
- Flag of the Commander of the Navy

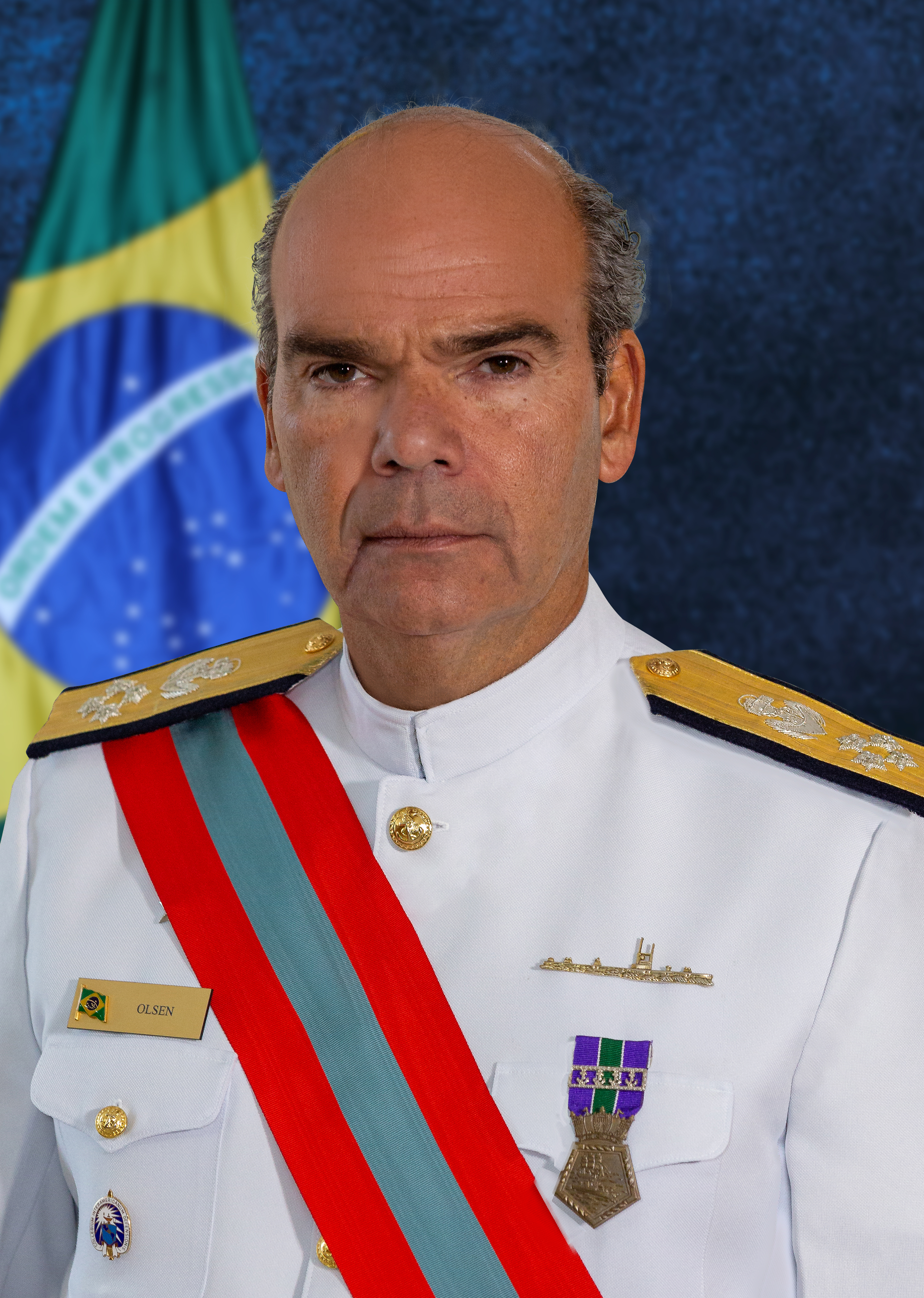
- Incumbent; Marcos Sampaio Olsen since 1 January 2023; 3 years ago
- Brazilian Navy
- Style: Almirante de Esquadra
- Member of: Joint Staff of the Armed Forces
- Reports to: Minister of Defence
- Appointer: President of Brazil
- Formation: 10 March 1808
- First holder: Manuel Antônio Farinha

This is a list of commanders of the Brazilian Navy.

With the creation of the Ministry of Defence, on 10 June 1999, by complementary law No. 97 of 9 June 1999, the Ministry of the Navy was transformed into Navy Command, and the Minister of the Navy came to be called Commander of the Navy.

== United Kingdom of Portugal, Brazil and the Algarves ==
Name	Start	End	Head of government
João Rodrigues de Sá e Menezes	10 March 1808	30 December 1809	John VI (also head of state)
Fernando José de Portugal e Castro	30 December 1809	7 January 1810	John VI (also head of state)
João de Almeida Melo e Castro	7 January 1810	18 January 1814	John VI (also head of state)
António de Araújo e Azevedo	18 January 1814	21 June 1817	John VI (also head of state)
João Paulo Bezerra de Seixas	21 June 1817	29 November 1817	John VI (also head of state)
Tomás Antônio de Vila Nova Portugal	29 November 1817	5 February 1818	John VI (also head of state)
Marcos de Noronha e Brito	5 February 1818	22 February 1821	John VI (also head of state)
Joaquim José Monteiro Torres	22 February 1821	22 April 1821	John VI (also head of state)
Manuel Antônio Farinha	22 April 1821	22 October 1822	John VI (also head of state)

- Reference: Brazilian Navy

== Empire of Brazil ==
=== Reign of Pedro I ===
No.	Name	Start	End	Head of government
1	Manuel Antônio Farinha	16 January 1822		Pedro I (also head of state)
2	Luís da Cunha Moreira	22 October 1822	15 November 1823	Pedro I (also head of state)
—	Pedro José da Costa Barros (acting)	15 November 1823	17 November 1823	Pedro I (also head of state)
3	Francisco Vilela Barbosa	17 November 1823	16 January 1827	Pedro I (also head of state)
4	Francisco Afonso Menezes Sousa Coutinho	16 January 1827	22 November 1827	Pedro I (also head of state)
5	Diogo Jorge de Brito	22 November 1827	30 May 1828	Pedro I (also head of state)
—	João Carlos Augusto von Oyenhausen-Gravenburg (acting)	30 May 1828	6 June 1828	Pedro I (also head of state)
—	Diogo Jorge de Brito (acting)	6 June 1828	16 June 1828	Pedro I (also head of state)
6	Miguel de Sousa Melo e Alvim	16 June 1828	4 December 1829	Pedro I (also head of state)
7	Francisco Vilela Barbosa	4 December 1829	18 March 1831	Pedro I (also head of state)
—	José Manuel de Almeida (acting)	19 March 1831	5 April 1831	Pedro I (also head of state)
—	Francisco Vilela Barbosa (acting)	5 April 1831	7 April 1831	Pedro I (also head of state)

=== Regency period ===
No.	Name	Start	End	Head of government
7	José Manuel de Almeida	7 April 1831	17 June 1831	Provisional Triumviral Regency
7	José Manuel de Almeida	17 June 1831	28 October 1831	Permanent Triumviral Regency
8	Joaquim José Rodrigues Torres	28 October 1831	3 August 1832	Permanent Triumviral Regency
—	Bento Barroso Pereira (acting)	3 August 1832	14 September 1832	Permanent Triumviral Regency
—	Antero José Ferreira de Brito (acting)	14 September 1832	8 November 1832	Permanent Triumviral Regency
9	Joaquim José Rodrigues Torres	8 November 1832	30 July 1834	Permanent Triumviral Regency
—	Antero José Ferreira de Brito (acting)	30 July 1834	16 January 1835	Permanent Triumviral Regency
—	João Paulo dos Santos Barreto (acting)	16 January 1835	14 March 1835	Permanent Triumviral Regency
—	Joaquim Vieira da Silva e Sousa (acting)	14 March 1835	17 March 1835	Permanent Triumviral Regency
10	José Pereira Pinto	17 March 1835	14 October 1835	Permanent Triumviral Regency
—	Manuel da Fonseca Lima e Silva (acting)	14 October 1835	5 February 1836	Diogo Antônio Feijó
11	Salvador José Maciel	5 February 1836	16 May 1837	Diogo Antônio Feijó
12	Tristão Pio dos Santos	16 May 1837	18 September 1837	Diogo Antônio Feijó
13	Joaquim José Rodrigues Torres	18 September 1837	16 April 1839	Pedro de Araújo Lima
14	Jacinto Roque de Sena Pereira	16 April 1839	23 May 1840	Pedro de Araújo Lima
15	Joaquim José Rodrigues Torres	23 May 1840	23 July 1840	Pedro de Araújo Lima

=== Reign of Pedro II ===
No.	Name	Start	End	Head of government
16	Antônio Francisco de Paula de Holanda Cavalcanti de Albuquerque	24 July 1840	23 March 1841	Pedro II (also head of state)
17	Francisco Vilela Barbosa	23 March 1841	26 August 1841	Pedro II (also head of state)
—	José Clemente Pereira	26 August 1841	13 September 1841	Pedro II (also head of state)
—	Francisco Vilela Barbosa	13 September 1841	20 January 1843	Pedro II (also head of state)
18	Joaquim José Rodrigues Torres	20 January 1843	24 January 1843	Pedro II (also head of state)
—	Salvador José Maciel	24 January 1843	2 February 1843	Pedro II (also head of state)
19	Joaquim José Rodrigues Torres	2 February 1843	2 February 1844	Pedro II (also head of state)
20	Jerônimo Francisco Coelho	2 February 1844	23 May 1844	Pedro II (also head of state)
21	Antônio Francisco de Paula de Holanda Cavalcanti de Albuquerque	23 May 1844	17 May 1847	Pedro II (also head of state)
—	João Paulo dos Santos Barreto	17 May 1847	22 May 1847	Pedro II (also head of state)
22	Cândido Batista de Oliveira	22 May 1847	8 March 1848	Manuel Alves Branco
—	Manuel Felizardo de Sousa e Melo	8 March 1848	14 May 1848	José de Almeida Torres
23	Joaquim Antão Fernandes Leão	14 May 1848	29 September 1848	José de Almeida Torres; Sousa e Melo
24	Manuel Felizardo de Sousa e Melo	29 September 1848	23 July 1849	Pedro de Araújo Lima
25	Manuel Vieira Tosta	23 July 1849	11 May 1852	Pedro de Araújo Lima; José da Costa Carvalho
26	Zacarias de Góis e Vasconcelos	11 May 1852	6 September 1853	Joaquim Rodrigues Torres
—	Pedro de Alcântara Bellegarde	6 September 1853	15 December 1853	Honório Carneiro Leão
27	José Maria da Silva Paranhos	15 February 1853	14 June 1855	Honório Carneiro Leão
28	João Maurício Wanderley	14 June 1855	8 October 1856	Honório Carneiro Leão; Luís Alves de Lima e Silva
—	José Maria da Silva Paranhos	8 October 1856	4 May 1857	Luís Alves de Lima e Silva
29	José Antônio Saraiva	4 May 1857	12 December 1858	Pedro de Araújo Lima
30	Antônio Paulino Limpo de Abreu	12 December 1858	10 August 1859	Antônio Limpo de Abreu
31	Francisco Xavier Pais Barreto	10 August 1859	2 March 1861	Ângelo da Silva Ferraz
32	Joaquim José Inácio	2 March 1861	24 May 1862	Luís Alves de Lima e Silva
—	José Bonifácio de Andrada e Silva	24 May 1862	30 May 1862	Zacarias de Góis
33	Joaquim Raimundo de Lamare	30 May 1862	15 January 1864	Pedro de Araújo Lima
34	João Pedro Dias Vieira	15 January 1864	31 March 1864	Zacarias de Góis
35	Francisco Carlos de Araújo Brusque	31 March 1864	31 August 1864	Zacarias de Góis
36	Francisco Xavier Pinto de Lima	31 August 1864	12 May 1865	Francisco José Furtado
—	José Antônio Saraiva	12 May 1865	27 June 1865	Pedro de Araújo Lima
37	Francisco de Paula da Silveira Lobo	27 June 1865	27 January 1866	Pedro de Araújo Lima
—	José Antônio Saraiva	27 January 1866	17 February 1866	Pedro de Araújo Lima
38	Francisco de Paula da Silveira Lobo	17 February 1866	3 August 1866	Pedro de Araújo Lima
39	Afonso Celso de Assis Figueiredo	3 August 1866	16 July 1868	Zacarias de Góis
40	João Maurício Wanderley	16 July 1868	29 September 1870	Joaquim Rodrigues Torres
41	Luís Antônio Pereira Franco	29 September 1870	7 March 1871	Pimenta Bueno
42	Manuel Antônio Duarte de Azevedo	7 March 1871	18 May 1872	José Paranhos
43	Joaquim Delfino Ribeiro da Luz	18 May 1872	25 June 1875	José Paranhos
44	Luís Antônio Pereira Franco	25 June 1875	5 January 1878	Luís Alves de Lima e Silva
45	Eduardo de Andrade Pinto	5 January 1878	24 December 1878	Cansanção de Sinimbu
46	João Ferreira de Moura	24 December 1878	9 December 1879	Cansanção de Sinimbu
—	João Lustosa da Cunha Paranaguá	9 December 1879	24 January 1880	Cansanção de Sinimbu
47	João Ferreira de Moura	24 January 1880	28 March 1880	Cansanção de Sinimbu
—	Pedro Luís Pereira de Sousa	28 March 1880	30 March 1880	José Antônio Saraiva
48	José Rodrigues de Lima Duarte	30 March 1880	21 January 1882	José Antônio Saraiva
—	Afonso Augusto Moreira Pena	21 January 1882	28 January 1882	Martinho Campos
49	Bento Francisco de Paula Sousa	28 January 1882	6 May 1882	Martinho Campos
50	Antônio Carneiro da Rocha	6 May 1882	3 July 1882	Martinho Campos
51	João Florentino Meira de Vasconcelos	3 July 1882	24 May 1883	João da Cunha Paranaguá
52	Antônio de Almeida e Oliveira	24 May 1883	6 June 1884	Lafayette Rodrigues Pereira
53	Joaquim Raimundo de Lamare	6 June 1884	6 May 1885	Manuel de Sousa Dantas
54	Luís Filipe de Sousa Leão	6 May 1885	20 August 1885	José Antônio Saraiva
55	Alfredo Rodrigues Fernandes Chaves	20 August 1885	12 June 1886	João Maurício Wanderley
56	Samuel Wallace MacDowell III	12 June 1886	10 May 1887	João Maurício Wanderley
57	Carlos Frederico Castrioto	10 May 1887	10 March 1888	João Maurício Wanderley
58	Luís Antônio Vieira da Silva	10 March 1888	4 January 1889	João Correia de Oliveira
—	Tomás José Coelho de Almeida	4 January 1889	8 February 1889	João Correia de Oliveira
59	Joaquim Elísio Pereira Marinho	8 February 1889	7 June 1889	João Correia de Oliveira
60	José da Costa Azevedo	7 June 1889	15 November 1889	Afonso Celso

== Republican period ==
=== First Brazilian Republic ===
No.	Name	Start	End	President
61	Eduardo Wandenkolk	15 November 1889	22 January 1891	Deodoro da Fonseca
62	Fortunato Foster Vidal	22 January 1891	23 November 1891	Deodoro da Fonseca
63	Custódio José de Melo	23 November 1891	30 April 1893	Floriano Peixoto
64	Filipe Firmino Rodrigues Chaves	30 April 1893	5 January 1894	Floriano Peixoto
65	Francisco José Coelho Neto	5 January 1894	26 June 1894	Floriano Peixoto
—	Bibiano Sérgio Macedo Costallat (acting)	26 June 1894	2 July 1894	Floriano Peixoto
66	João Gonçalves Duarte	2 July 1894	5 November 1894	Floriano Peixoto
67	Eliziário José Barbosa	15 November 1894	21 November 1896	Prudente de Morais
68	Manuel José Alves Barbosa	21 November 1896	15 November 1898	Prudente de Morais
69	Carlos Baltasar da Silveira	15 November 1898	19 August 1899	Campos Sales
70	José Pinto da Luz	19 August 1899	15 November 1902	Campos Sales
71	Júlio César de Noronha	15 November 1902	15 November 1906	Rodrigues Alves
72	Alexandrino Faria de Alencar	15 November 1906	14 June 1909	Afonso Pena
72	Alexandrino Faria de Alencar	14 June 1909	15 November 1910	Nilo Peçanha
73	Joaquim Marques Batista de Leão	15 November 1910	11 January 1912	Hermes da Fonseca
74	Manuel Inácio Belfort Vieira	11 January 1912	12 July 1913	Hermes da Fonseca
75	Vespasiano Gonçalves de Albuquerque e Silva (acting)	12 July 1913	2 August 1913	Hermes da Fonseca
76	Alexandrino Faria de Alencar	2 August 1913	15 November 1914	Hermes da Fonseca
76	Alexandrino Faria de Alencar	15 November 1914	15 November 1918	Venceslau Brás
77	Antônio Coutinho Gomes Pereira	15 November 1918	26 July 1919	Delfim Moreira
78	Raul Soares de Moura	26 July 1919	20 October 1920	Epitácio Pessoa
79	Joaquim Ferreira Chaves	20 October 1920	12 September 1921	Epitácio Pessoa
80	João Pedro da Veiga Miranda	12 September 1921	15 November 1922	Epitácio Pessoa
81	Alexandrino Faria de Alencar	15 November 1922	18 April 1926	Artur Bernardes
82	Arnaldo de Siqueira Pinto da Luz	20 April 1926	15 November 1926	Artur Bernardes
82	Arnaldo de Siqueira Pinto da Luz	15 November 1926	20 October 1930	Washington Luís

=== Vargas Era (Second and Third Brazilian Republics) ===
No.	Name	Start	End	President
83	José Isaías de Noronha	25 October 1930	3 November 1930	Military Junta of 1930
83	José Isaías de Noronha	3 November 1930	17 December 1930	Getúlio Vargas
84	Conrado Heck	17 December 1930	9 June 1931	Getúlio Vargas
85	Protógenes Pereira Guimarães	9 June 1931	12 November 1935	Getúlio Vargas
86	Henrique Aristides Guilhem	12 November 1935	30 October 1945	Getúlio Vargas
87	Jorge Dodsworth Martins	30 October 1945	31 January 1946	José Linhares

=== Fourth Brazilian Republic ===
No.	Name	Start	End	President
87	Jorge Dodsworth Martins	31 January 1946	29 September 1946	Eurico Dutra
88	Sílvio de Noronha	29 August 1946	31 January 1951	Eurico Dutra
89	Renato de Almeida Guillobel	31 January 1951	26 August 1954	Getúlio Vargas
90	Edmundo Jordão Amorim do Vale	26 August 1954	11 November 1955	Café Filho
91	Antônio Alves Câmara Júnior	11 November 1955	31 January 1956	Nereu Ramos
91	Antônio Alves Câmara Júnior	31 January 1956	19 August 1958	Juscelino Kubitschek
92	Jorge do Paço Matoso Maia	19 August 1958	3 January 1961	Juscelino Kubitschek
93	Sílvio Heck	3 January 1961	25 August 1961	Jânio Quadros
93	Sílvio Heck	25 August 1961	8 September 1961	Ranieri Mazzilli
94	Ângelo Nolasco de Almeida	8 September 1961	27 June 1962	João Goulart
—	Heitor Doyle Maia (acting)	27 June 1962	12 July 1962	João Goulart
95	Pedro Paulo de Araújo Suzano	12 July 1962	14 June 1963	João Goulart
96	Sílvio Borges de Sousa Mota	14 June 1963	27 March 1964	João Goulart
97	Paulo Mário da Cunha Rodrigues	27 March 1964	4 April 1964	João Goulart

=== Military dictatorship (Fifth Brazilian Republic) ===
No.	Name	Start	End	President
98	Augusto Rademaker	4 April 1964	20 April 1964	Ranieri Mazzilli
99	Ernesto de Melo Batista	20 April 1964	15 January 1965	Castelo Branco
100	Paulo Bosísio	15 January 1965	17 December 1965	Castelo Branco
101	Zilmar Campos de Araripe Macedo	17 December 1965	15 March 1967	Castelo Branco
102	Augusto Rademaker	15 March 1967	31 August 1969	Costa e Silva
102	Augusto Rademaker	31 August 1969	30 October 1969	Military Junta of 1969
103	Adalberto de Barros Nunes	30 October 1969	15 March 1974	Emílio Médici
104	Geraldo Azevedo Henning	15 March 1974	15 March 1979	Ernesto Geisel
105	Maximiano Eduardo da Silva Fonseca	15 March 1979	21 March 1984	João Figueiredo
106	Alfredo Karam	21 March 1984	15 March 1985	João Figueiredo

=== Sixth Brazilian Republic ===
No.	Name	Start	End	President
107	Henrique Saboia	15 March 1985	15 March 1990	José Sarney
108	Mário César Flores	15 March 1990	8 October 1992	Fernando Collor
109	Ivan da Silveira Serpa	8 October 1992	1 January 1995	Itamar Franco
110	Mauro César Rodrigues Pereira	1 January 1995	31 December 1998	Fernando Henrique Cardoso
111	Sérgio Gitirana Florêncio Chagasteles	1 January 1999	10 June 1999	Fernando Henrique Cardoso
Commander of the Navy
—	Sérgio Gitirana Florêncio Chagasteles	10 June 1999	3 January 2003	Fernando Henrique Cardoso
112	Roberto de Guimarães Carvalho	3 January 2003	1 March 2007	Lula da Silva
113	Julio Soares de Moura Neto	1 March 2007	1 January 2011	Lula da Silva
113	Julio Soares de Moura Neto	1 January 2011	7 February 2015	Dilma Rousseff
114	Eduardo Bacellar Leal Ferreira	7 February 2015	31 August 2016	Dilma Rousseff
114	Eduardo Bacellar Leal Ferreira	31 August 2016	9 January 2019	Michel Temer
115	Ilques Barbosa Junior	9 January 2019	31 March 2021	Jair Bolsonaro
116	Almir Garnier Santos	31 March 2021	1 January 2023	Jair Bolsonaro
117	Marcos Sampaio Olsen	1 January 2023	incumbent	Lula da Silva
