= Trial for the 2022–2023 Brazilian coup plot =

2025 Supreme Court of Brazil case on 2022 coup attempt

AP 2668
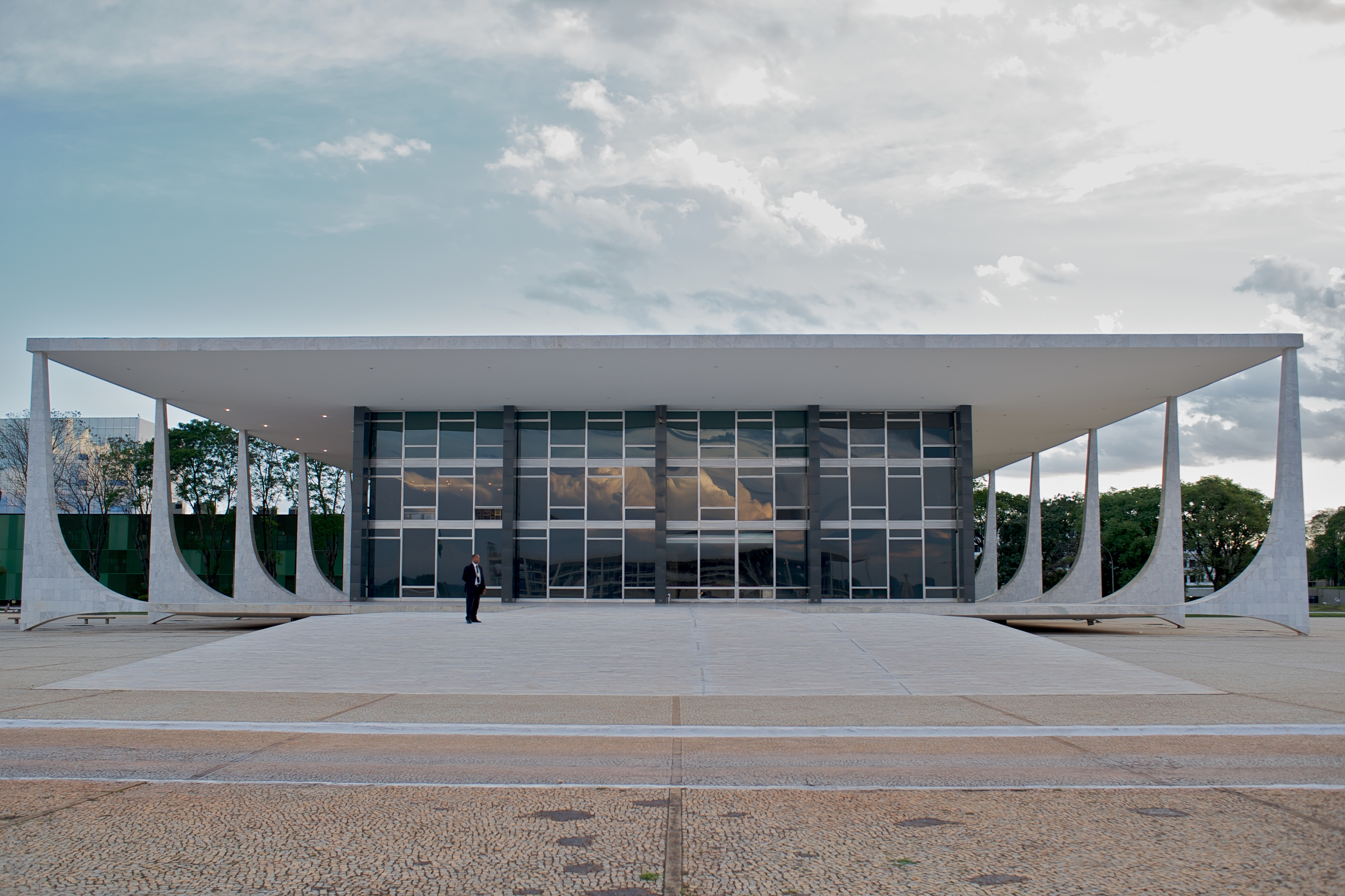
- Court: Supreme Federal Court
- Full case name: Ação Penal 2668 (Public Prosecutor's Office v. Jair Bolsonaro, Mauro Cid, Augusto Heleno, Walter Braga Netto, Paulo Sérgio Nogueira, Alexandre Ramagem, Almir Garnier Santos, Anderson Torres)
- Started: 11 April 2025 (17 months ago)
- Decided: 11 September 2025

Court membership
- Judges sitting: President: Cristiano Zanin; Justices: Flávio Dino; Luiz Fux; Cármen Lúcia; Alexandre de Moraes (rapporteur)

Case opinions
- Decision by: Moraes
- Concurrence: Dino, Lúcia, Zanin
- Dissent: Fux

Keywords
- Self-coup; Electoral fraud allegations; Voter suppression; Assassination plot

In 2025, the Supreme Federal Court of Brazil ruled on a criminal case concerning the 2022–2023 Brazilian coup plot, which followed the election win of Luiz Inácio Lula da Silva against Jair Bolsonaro. The defendants—including the former president Bolsonaro—were convicted in a 4–1 vote for participation in an armed criminal organization, attempted violent abolition of the democratic rule of law, attempted coup d'état, qualified damage, and deterioration of protected heritage property.

== Background ==
During and after the 2022 Brazilian general election, a network of members of former president Jair Bolsonaro's government and of the Brazilian Armed Forces planned to subvert the transition of power to newly elected president Luiz Inácio Lula da Silva, arrest Supreme Federal Court (STF) justice Alexandre de Moraes and Federal Senate president Rodrigo Pacheco, and shut down several government institutions, such as the National Congress, the Superior Electoral Court and the STF, in an attempt to keep Bolsonaro in power and consolidate his control over the federal government. The plans, evidence, and individuals involved in planning a coup d'état were gradually revealed in investigations conducted by public agencies and the press in 2023 and 2024.

After the 8 January Brasília attacks, more than 1,400 people were charged for their alleged role in the riots. Valdemar Costa Neto, head of the Liberal Party, and three aides to Bolsonaro were arrested on 8 February 2024. On 21 November 2024, the Federal Police formally accused Bolsonaro and 36 people of an attempt to overthrow Brazil's democratic institutions, including a plot to assassinate Lula, Vice President-elect Geraldo Alckmin and Supreme Court Justice Moraes. On 14 December 2024, Bolsonaro's 2022 running mate and former Chief of Staff, General Walter Braga Netto, was arrested. On 18 February 2025, Prosecutor General Paulo Gonet formally indicted Bolsonaro and 34 others for an attempted coup d'état. On 26 March, the Supreme Court accepted the Prosecutor General's complaint and considered Bolsonaro and seven other allies as defendants in the case.

Beginning in July 2025, the Trump administration in the United States began openly clashing with Brazilian authorities, claiming Bolsonaro was the victim of a witch hunt without presenting solid grounds. As a result, the US imposed a 50% tariff on all Brazilian imports, revoked the visas of eight Brazilian Supreme Court justices, and applied the Magnitsky Act against Moraes. In response, Brazil's president Lula published an article in The New York Times saying that he wants to "establish an open and frank dialogue with the president of the United States", but stated that "Brazilian democracy and sovereignty are non-negotiable". Following subsequent diplomatic contacts between Lula and Trump, tensions gradually eased toward the end of 2025, with the Trump administration lifting the additional tariffs and revoking the sanctions against Moraes. On 16 June 2026, the Supreme Court sentenced Eduardo Bolsonaro to 4 years and 2 months in prison for coercion in judicial proceedings after finding that he had lobbied the Trump administration to impose sanctions aimed at influencing the trial of his father, Jair Bolsonaro.

== Votes ==
=== Alexandre de Moraes ===
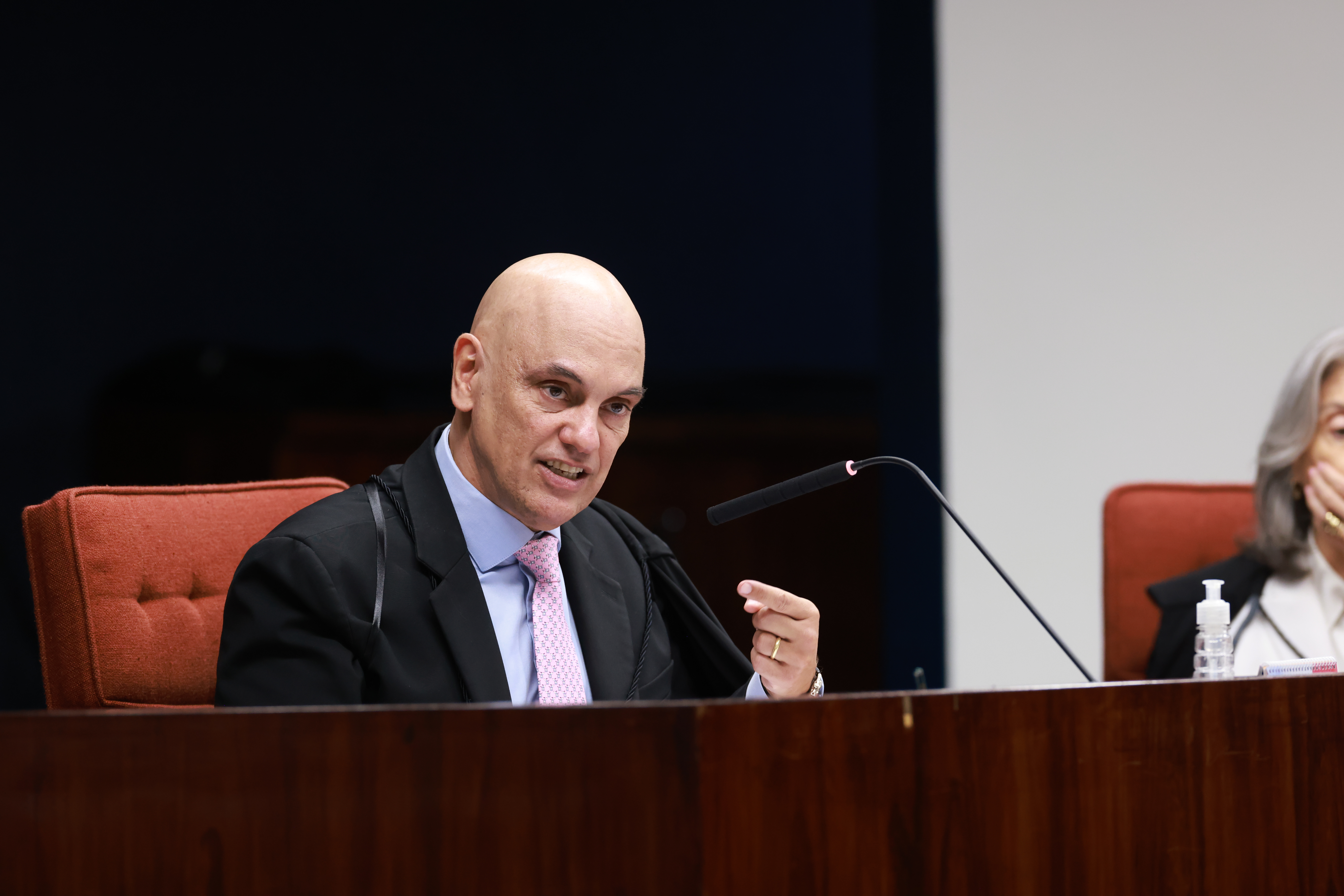
Justice Alexandre de Moraes declaring his decision on the case

On 9 September 2025, justice Alexandre de Moraes, as rapporteur, started the voting process during a 5-hour reading of his decision, voting to convict all defendants. Moraes argued the coup plot began in June 2021, starting when former president Jair Bolsonaro and his allies intentionally attempted to undermine the country's electronic voting system, laying the groundwork for claims of election fraud and a coup if Bolsonaro lost the 2022 presidential election. After losing the election, Moraes sees evidence of Bolsonaro attempting to convince leaders of the armed forces to engage in a military intervention to prevent recently elected Lula from taking power, though failing to gather enough support. Additionally, Moraes points to a plan to assassinate himself, president-elect Lula and vice-president-elect Geraldo Alckmin, which had been aborted at the last minute. Failing to gather military support, a week after Lula's inauguration as president, Bolsonaro supporters invaded the presidential palace and other government buildings in the 8 January attacks, incited by Bolsonaro himself, Moraes argued.

In his vote, Moraes delineated 13 actions and decisions by the defendants which, he argued, constituted a criminal organization in coordinated and premeditated effort to revert the results of the 2022 presidential election and keep Bolsonaro in power. Moraes was lauded for his vote, for narrating the chronology of events years prior to the 8 January attacks which laid the groundwork for it.

=== Flávio Dino ===
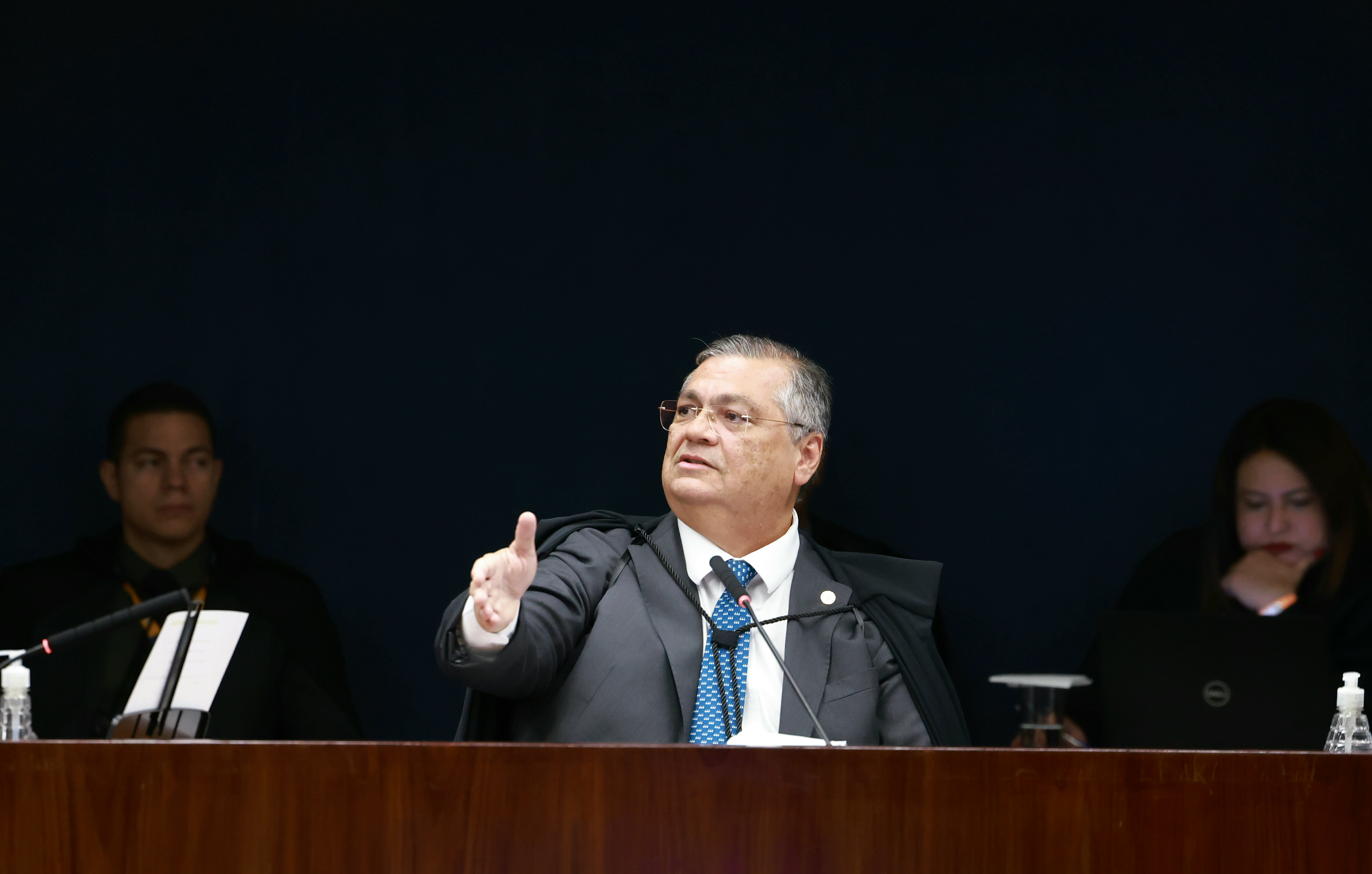
Justice Flávio Dino arguing for his concurring vote on the case

In the afternoon of 9 September 2025, justice Flávio Dino concurred with the decision, though arguing that some defendants had a higher level of culpability than others, supporting sentencing accordingly. The justice also dismissed claims that the Court was acting in an authoritarian or tyrannical manner or engaging in judicial activism, and poked fun at the recent diplomatic animosity from the United States regarding the case: "do people believe that a tweet from a foreign government's authority will change a ruling of the Court? Does anyone think that a credit card or Mickey are going to change the ruling of the Court?".

=== Luiz Fux ===
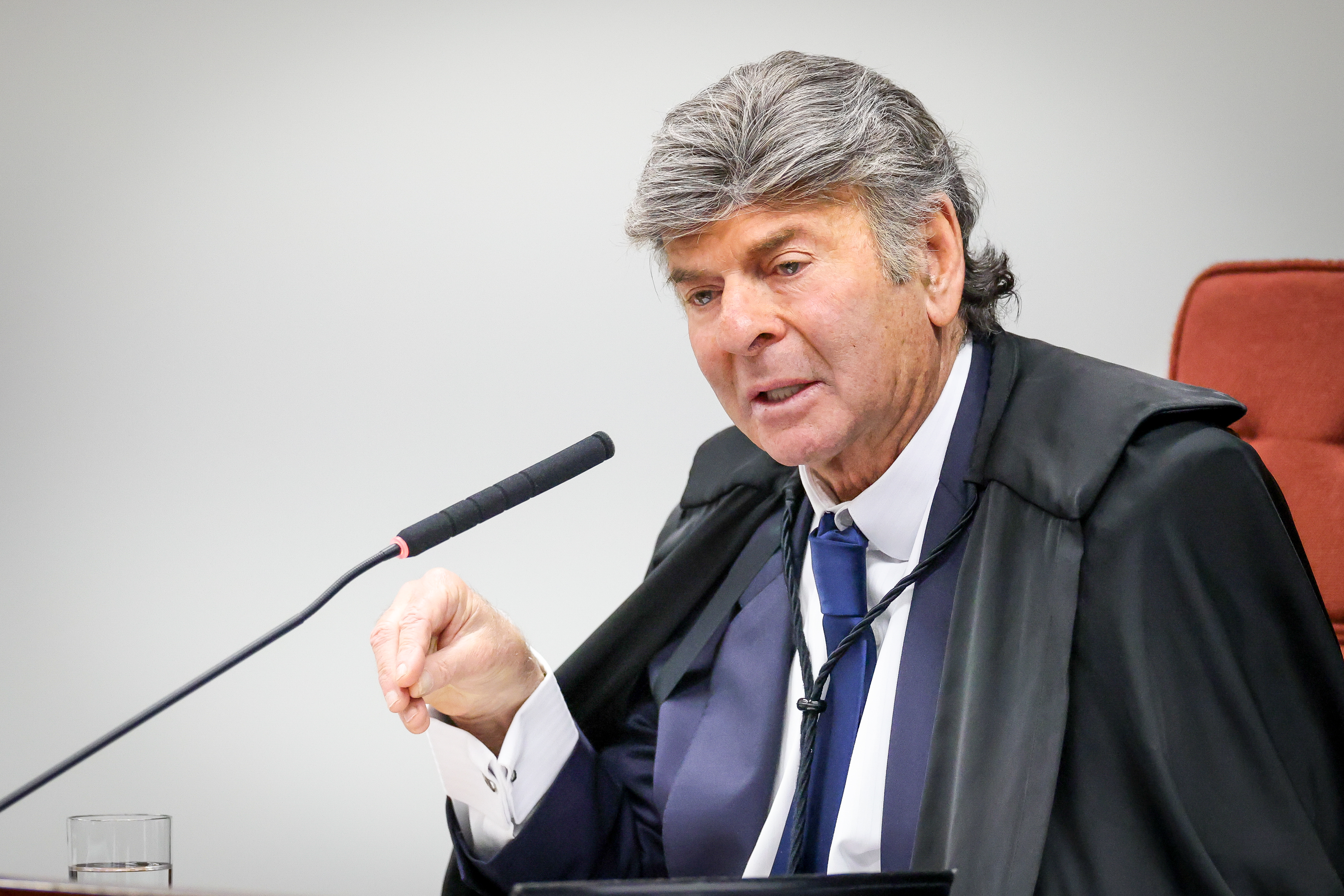
Justice Luiz Fux giving a dissenting vote on the case

On 10 September 2025, justice Luiz Fux dissented, voting to annul the case on multiple accounts. Fux's vote reading lasted over 10 hours, the third longest in the Court's history, during which he argued, among other things, that:

- the Supreme Federal Court did not have the jurisdiction to convict the defendants, as they no longer held office at the time of the trial and, thus, would not be subject to privileged forum; as such, that the Court was "absolutely not competent" to rule this case;
- even if the Court was to have jurisdiction over the case, the defendants should be tried by the full Court (of 11 justices) and not the 5 member "First Class" panel;
- the Ação Penal itself should be annulled, because the defense was not given enough time to prepare due to the great amount of documents submitted as evidence;
- an attempted coup conviction is meant to punish "conduct that deliberately leads the nation to authoritarian regime (...) with the effective capability to attain that objective in all its necessary aspects" – which would not apply in this case;
- the crime of attempted coup, as defined in the penal code, should not apply to self-coups;
- Bolsonaro only "considered" measures to remain in power, but "nothing happened", and that would not be enough to convict the former president;
- the defendants could not be punished for the actions of third-parties in the 8 January attacks;
- the crime of "participation in an armed criminal organization" requires, among other things, a clear organizational structure, roles attributed to the organization's members and the goal of obtaining some form of advantage through illicit means, which would not apply to any of the defendants;
- the crimes of "attempted violent abolition of the democratic rule of law" and "attempted coup d'état" are the same penal type, and thus only one, if any, should apply.

Fux voted to convict Mauro Cid and Walter Braga Netto for the crime of attempted violent abolition of the democratic rule of law, but to acquit them of all others. Alongside Moraes and Dino's votes, a majority was then formed in the Court to convict these defendants for that crime. Fux voted to acquit the other defendants, including Jair Bolsonaro, and to dismiss the case against Alexandre Ramagem.

==== Criticism ====
Following Fux's vote, the justice was criticized for a perceived partiality: when ruling against the rioters of the 8 January attacks, Fux convicted hundreds of defendants without bringing up any of the points argued for in this case, including the supposed lack of jurisdiction of the Court or requirements for what constitutes a criminal organization. This raises an apparent contradiction: the justice seemingly believes the Court had jurisdiction over ordinary citizens, but not when ruling over what are deemed to be the figureheads of the movement. Further, since March 2024 it has been the Court's understanding that it holds jurisdiction to rule on cases of people who, at the time of committing a crime, held office.

Moreover, among the arguments for the annulment of the case, Fux cited Operation Car Wash, which had convicted Lula but was later overturned in the Court for having been tried in a lower, incorrect jurisdiction. However, at the time, Fux voted against overturning the conviction, arguing that annulling the decision would be a formality that did not justify invalidating the sentencing, as part of a dissenting 3 that lost to 8 concurring justices. Anticipating criticism, during his vote, Fux stated that "to change one's understanding is to evolve" and that "the law is not a museum of principles; it is in constant mutation".

=== Cármen Lúcia ===
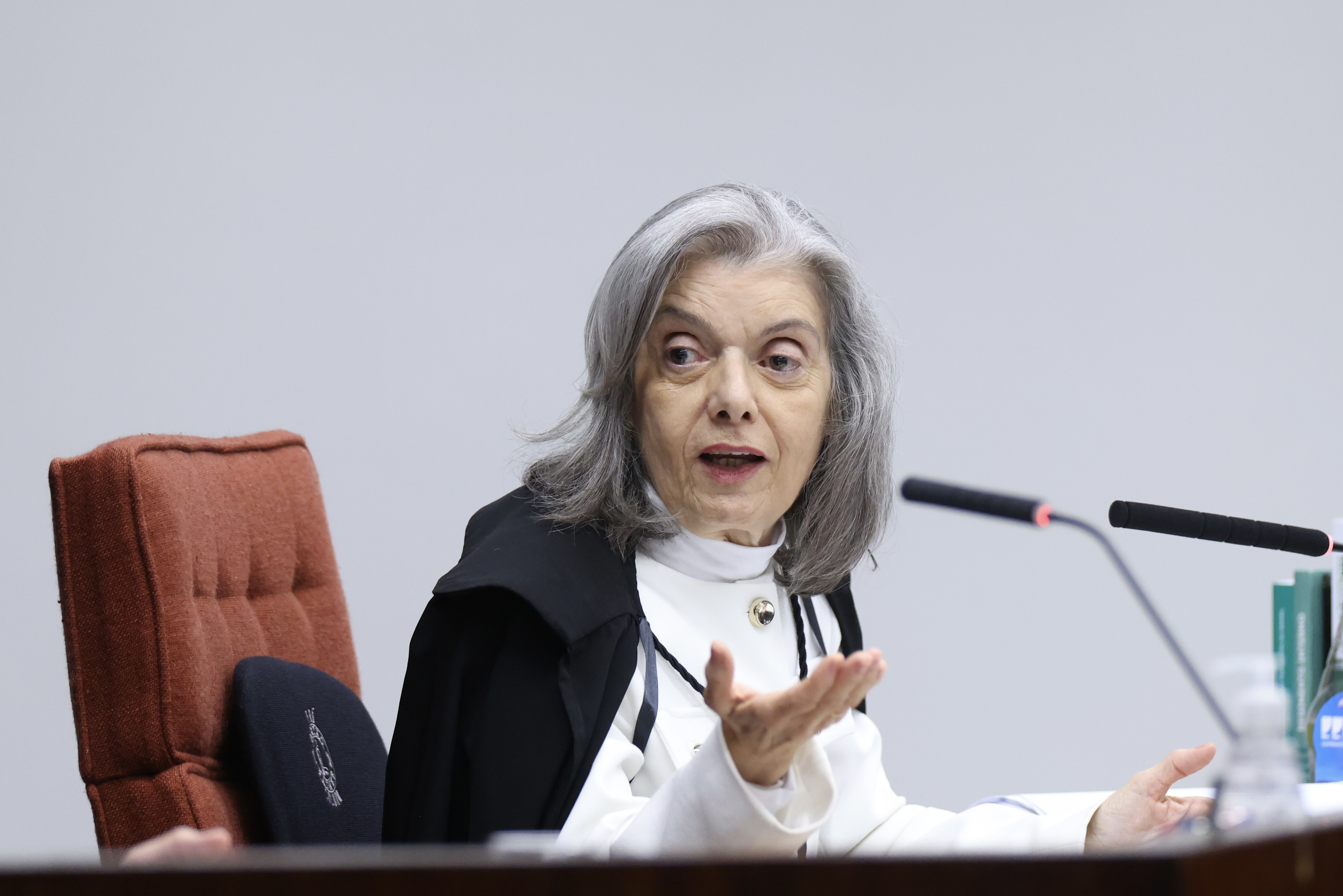
Justice Cármen Lúcia concurring with the rapporteur on the case

On 11 September 2025, justice Cármen Lúcia concurred with the rapporteur. Lúcia considered that the attorney's office had shown there had been a collection of measures formulated and executed with the goal of bringing radicalization to the social and political spheres, aiming to fabricate a crisis that would set the stage for a coup. She further noted that the attempt of a coup is self-evidently what the law punishes, as if it is otherwise successful, there would no longer be anyone there to judge it.

=== Cristiano Zanin ===
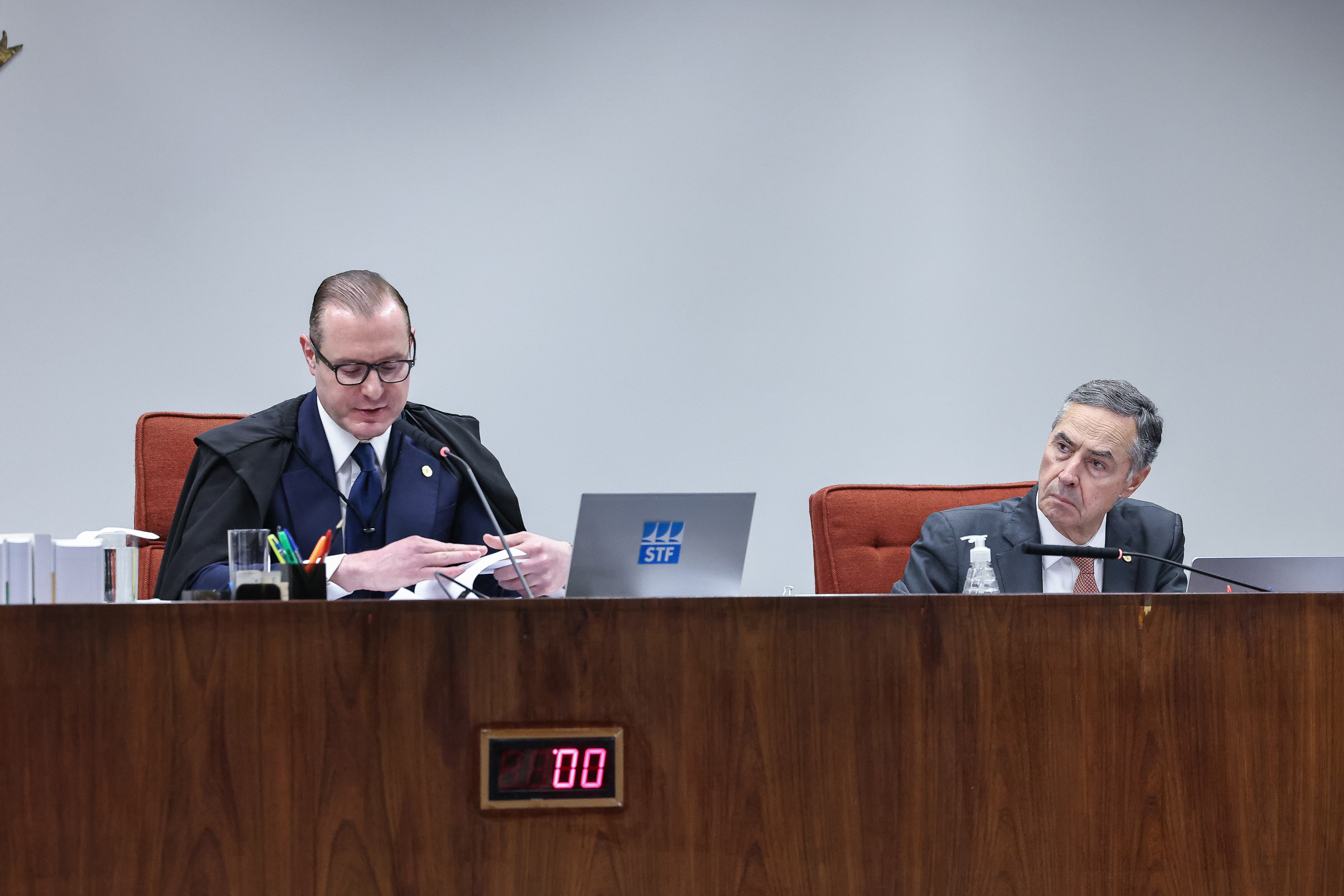
Justice Cristiano Zanin reading his concurring vote

Following justice Cármen Lúcia's vote, on 11 September 2025, justice Cristiano Zanin concurred with the rapporteur, voting to convict all defendants. Zanin argued that there was an organized, hierarchical structure with assigned roles and an aim to keep Bolsonaro in power through illicit means, meeting the definition previously described by Fux for the crime of participation in an armed criminal organization. Had justice Zanin dissented, most defendants (save for Cid and Netto) would have a 3–2 decision, allowing for an appeal that, if accepted, would put the conviction up for a vote at the plenary of the Court, with all 11 justices.

=== Punishment ===
On 11 September 2025, following the votes for convictions, the justices voted to sentence each of the defendants. They were decided as follows:

- Jair Bolsonaro, 27 years and 3 months in prison plus R$376 thousand in fines (US$70 thousand); (Note: 124 days-fine of 2 minimum wages (2 × R$1,518 = R$3,036) each.)
- Mauro Cid, 2 years in house arrest;
- Augusto Heleno, 21 years in prison plus R$128 thousand in fines (US$24 thousand); (Note: 84 days-fine of 1 minimum wage (R$1,518) each.)
- Walter Braga Netto, 26 years in prison plus R$152 thousand in fines (US$28 thousand); (Note: 100 days-fine of 1 minimum wage (R$1,518) each.)
- Paulo Sérgio Nogueira, 19 years in prison plus R$128 thousand in fines (US$24 thousand);
- Alexandre Ramagem, 16 years, 1 month and 15 days in prison plus R$76 thousand in fines (US$14 thousand); (Note: 50 days-fine of 1 minimum wage (R$1,518) each.)
- Almir Garnier Santos, 24 years in prison plus R$152 thousand in fines (US$28 thousand);
- Anderson Torres, 24 years in prison plus R$152 thousand in fines (US$28 thousand).

Furthermore, as Ramagem held the office as a member of the Chamber of Deputies at the time of the trial and his sentence exceeded the maximum of permitted absences (120 days), he was removed from office. All defendants were also prohibited from holding any elected office for 8 years after serving their sentences, in accordance with the Ficha Limpa law.

== High Court decision ==
=== Group 1: Leadership and Command ===
The trial of Group 1 took place between 2–11 September 2025 before the First Panel of the Supreme Federal Court and resulted in the conviction of all the 8 defendants. On 25 November, Justice Alexandre de Moraes ruled that the second set of appeals filed by the defense was not admissible, declared the case to have reached res judicata and ordered the beginning of the enforcement of the prison sentence for all the defendants.

Defendants	Criminal charges					Sentence
Defendants	Abolition of the democratic rule of law	Coup d'état	Criminal organization	Qualified damage	Deterioration of protected heritage property	Sentence
Jair Bolsonaro	Guilty; 4–1	Guilty; 4–1	Guilty; 4–1	Guilty; 4–1	Guilty; 4–1	27 years, 3 months
Walter Braga Netto	Guilty; 5–0	Guilty; 4–1	Guilty; 4–1	Guilty; 4–1	Guilty; 4–1	26 years
Anderson Torres	Guilty; 4–1	Guilty; 4–1	Guilty; 4–1	Guilty; 4–1	Guilty; 4–1	24 years
Almir Garnier	Guilty; 4–1	Guilty; 4–1	Guilty; 4–1	Guilty; 4–1	Guilty; 4–1	24 years
Augusto Heleno	Guilty; 4–1	Guilty; 4–1	Guilty; 4–1	Guilty; 4–1	Guilty; 4–1	21 years
Paulo Sérgio Nogueira	Guilty; 4–1	Guilty; 4–1	Guilty; 4–1	Guilty; 4–1	Guilty; 4–1	19 years
Alexandre Ramagem	Guilty; 4–1	Guilty; 4–1	Guilty; 4–1	Charges temporarily suspended (Note: The Supreme Federal Court ordered the partial suspension of the criminal case against Alexandre Ramagem only with regard to those two crimes allegedly committed after his inauguration as a congressman. These charges will be brought to trial after the end of his term.)		16 years, 1 month
Mauro Cid	Guilty; 5–0	Guilty; 4–1	Guilty; 4–1	Guilty; 4–1	Guilty; 4–1	2 years

=== Group 2: Management of Operation Actions ===
The trial of Group 2 (AP 2693) was held between 9–16 December 2025 and resulted in the conviction of 5 of the 6 defendants, with only Fernando de Sousa Oliveira being acquitted.

Defendants	Criminal charges					Sentence
Defendants	Abolition of the democratic rule of law	Coup d'état	Criminal organization	Qualified damage	Deterioration of protected heritage property	Sentence
Mário Fernandes	Guilty; 4–0	Guilty; 4–0	Guilty; 4–0	Guilty; 4–0	Guilty; 4–0	26 years, 6 months
Silvinei Vasques	Guilty; 4–0	Guilty; 4–0	Guilty; 4–0	Guilty; 4–0	Guilty; 4–0	24 years, 6 months
Filipe Martins	Guilty; 4–0	Guilty; 4–0	Guilty; 4–0	Guilty; 4–0	Guilty; 4–0	21 years
Marcelo Câmara	Guilty; 4–0	Guilty; 4–0	Guilty; 4–0	Guilty; 4–0	Guilty; 4–0	21 years
Marília Alencar	Guilty; 4–0	Not Guilty; 0–4	Guilty; 4–0	Not Guilty; 0–4	Not Guilty; 0–4	8 years, 6 months
Fernando de Sousa	Not Guilty; 0–4	Not Guilty; 0–4	Not Guilty; 0–4	Not Guilty; 0–4	Not Guilty; 0–4	—N/a

=== Group 3: Execution of Actions ===
The trial of Group 3 (AP 2696) took place between 11–18 November 2025 and led to the conviction of 9 of the 10 defendants, with only General Estevan Theophilo being acquitted. On 13 March 2026, Justice Alexandre de Moraes ruled that the second set of appeals filed by the defense was not admissible, declared the case to have reached res judicata and ordered the beginning of the enforcement of the prison sentence for all the convicted defendants.

Defendants	Criminal charges					Sentence
Defendants	Abolition of the democratic rule of law	Coup d'état	Criminal organization	Qualified damage	Deterioration of protected heritage property	Sentence
Hélio Ferreira Lima	Guilty; 4–0	Guilty; 4–0	Guilty; 4–0	Guilty; 4–0	Guilty; 4–0	24 years
Rafael Martins de Oliveira	Guilty; 4–0	Guilty; 4–0	Guilty; 4–0	Guilty; 4–0	Guilty; 4–0	21 years
Rodrigo Bezerra de Azevedo	Guilty; 4–0	Guilty; 4–0	Guilty; 4–0	Guilty; 4–0	Guilty; 4–0	21 years
Wladimir Matos Soares	Guilty; 4–0	Guilty; 4–0	Guilty; 4–0	Guilty; 4–0	Guilty; 4–0	21 years
Bernardo Romão Correa Neto	Guilty; 4–0	Guilty; 4–0	Guilty; 4–0	Guilty; 4–0	Guilty; 4–0	17 years
Sérgio Ricardo Cavaliere	Guilty; 4–0	Guilty; 4–0	Guilty; 4–0	Guilty; 4–0	Guilty; 4–0	17 years
Fabrício Moreira de Bastos	Guilty; 4–0	Guilty; 4–0	Guilty; 4–0	Guilty; 4–0	Guilty; 4–0	16 years
Márcio Nunes de Resende	Not Guilty; 0–4	Not Guilty; 0–4	Not Guilty; 0–4	Not Guilty; 0–4	Not Guilty; 0–4	3 years, 5 months (Note: The First Panel reclassified the charges he faced to criminal association and public incitement of animosity by the Armed Forces against the constituted branches of government, which are less serious offenses.)
Ronald Ferreira de Araújo	Not Guilty; 0–4	Not Guilty; 0–4	Not Guilty; 0–4	Not Guilty; 0–4	Not Guilty; 0–4	1 year, 11 months
Estevan Theophilo	Not Guilty; 0–4	Not Guilty; 0–4	Not Guilty; 0–4	Not Guilty; 0–4	Not Guilty; 0–4	—N/a

=== Group 4: Production and Dissemination of Disinformation ===
The trial of Group 4 (AP 2694) was held between 14–21 October 2025 and resulted in the conviction of all the 7 defendants.

Defendants	Criminal charges					Sentence
Defendants	Abolition of the democratic rule of law	Coup d'état	Criminal organization	Qualified damage	Deterioration of protected heritage property	Sentence
Ângelo Denicoli	Guilty; 4–1	Guilty; 4–1	Guilty; 4–1	Guilty; 4–1	Guilty; 4–1	17 years
Reginaldo Abreu	Guilty; 4–1	Guilty; 4–1	Guilty; 4–1	Guilty; 4–1	Guilty; 4–1	15 years, 6 months
Marcelo Bormevet	Guilty; 4–1	Guilty; 4–1	Guilty; 4–1	Guilty; 4–1	Guilty; 4–1	14 years, 6 months
Giancarlo Rodrigues	Guilty; 4–1	Guilty; 4–1	Guilty; 4–1	Guilty; 4–1	Guilty; 4–1	14 years
Guilherme Almeida	Guilty; 4–1	Guilty; 4–1	Guilty; 4–1	Guilty; 4–1	Guilty; 4–1	13 years, 6 months
Ailton Moraes Barros	Guilty; 4–1	Guilty; 4–1	Guilty; 4–1	Guilty; 4–1	Guilty; 4–1	13 years, 6 months
Carlos Cesar Rocha	Guilty; 4–1	Not Guilty; 0–5	Guilty; 4–1	Not Guilty; 0–5	Not Guilty; 0–5	7 years, 6 months

== Reactions and aftermath ==
Right- and left-wing world leaders reacted to the trial following its results.

Right-wing United States president Donald Trump answered a journalist's question about possible new sanctions on Brazil during a press conference on the assassination of Charlie Kirk, not making it clear whether they would be applied: "I watched the trial and I know him pretty well — foreign leader. I thought he was a good president of Brazil and it's very surprising that could happen, that's very much like they tried to do with me but they didn't get away with it at all." In a message on X, US Secretary of State Marco Rubio referred to Moraes as a "human rights abuser" and accused him of carrying out "political persecutions", saying the court's decision was unfair.

Left-wing Chilean president Gabriel Boric stated that Brazilian democracy demonstrated resilience. Colombian president Gustavo Petro defended Bolsonaro's conviction: "Every coup plotter must be convicted. These are the rules of democracy." The leader of the Workers' Cause Party (PCO), Rui Costa Pimenta, described the conviction as a "political trial" with "rigged cards," in which the Supreme Federal Court (STF) acts as an arm of the "bourgeoisie." He warned that the decision could create a "martyr" and strengthen the far-right, as well as benefit a "third way" supported by "imperialism," which, in his view, would be a more unfavorable scenario for the Workers' Party than a direct contest against Bolsonaro.

In Rio de Janeiro, the day after the conviction, thousands attended a carnival block – parades usually reserved for the early months of the year during carnival season – to celebrate the decision.

Six days after the trial, Bolsonaro was diagnosed with skin cancer after a procedure found Squamous-cell carcinoma in lesions of his skin.

=== Protests against amnesty ===
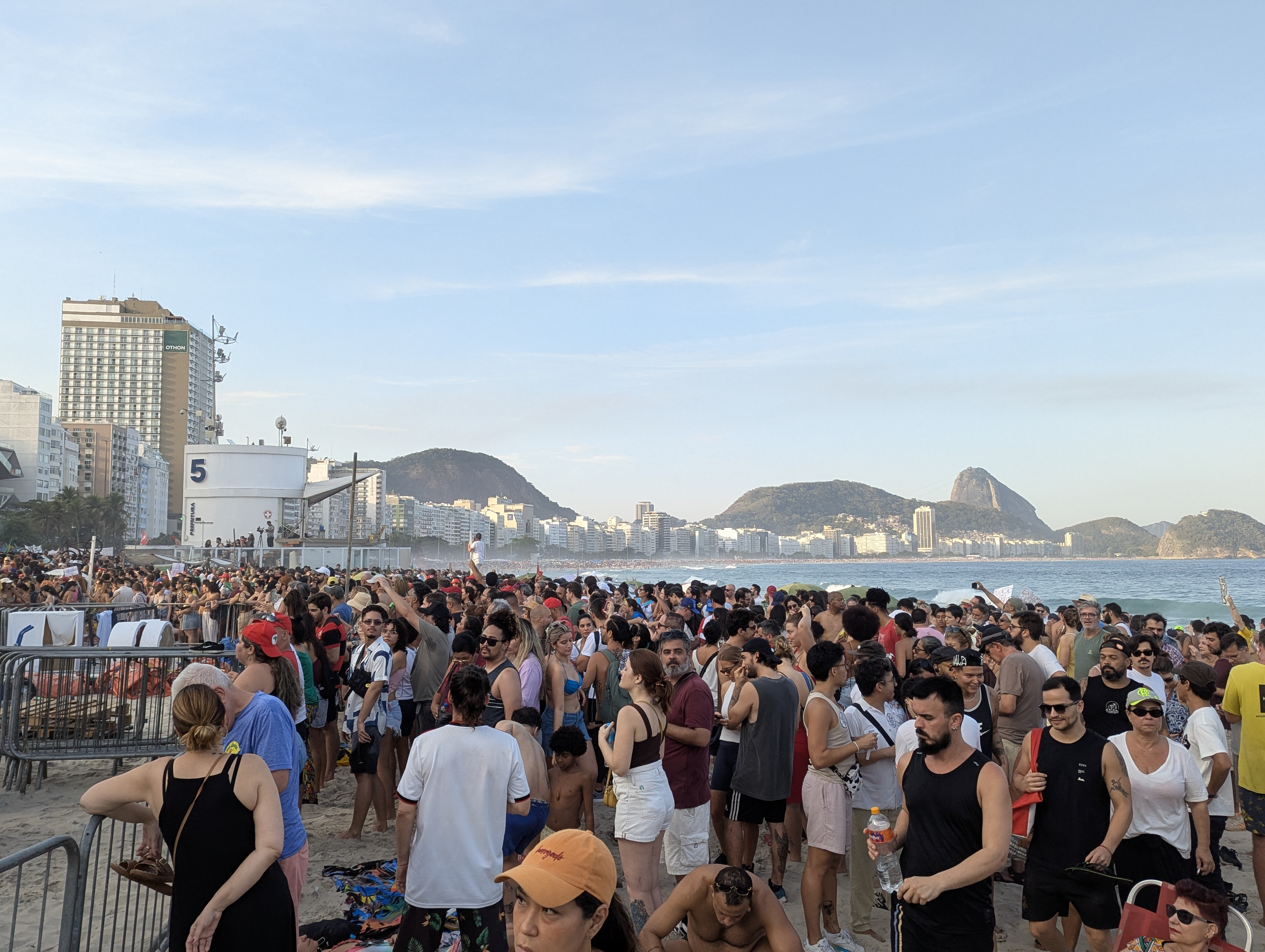
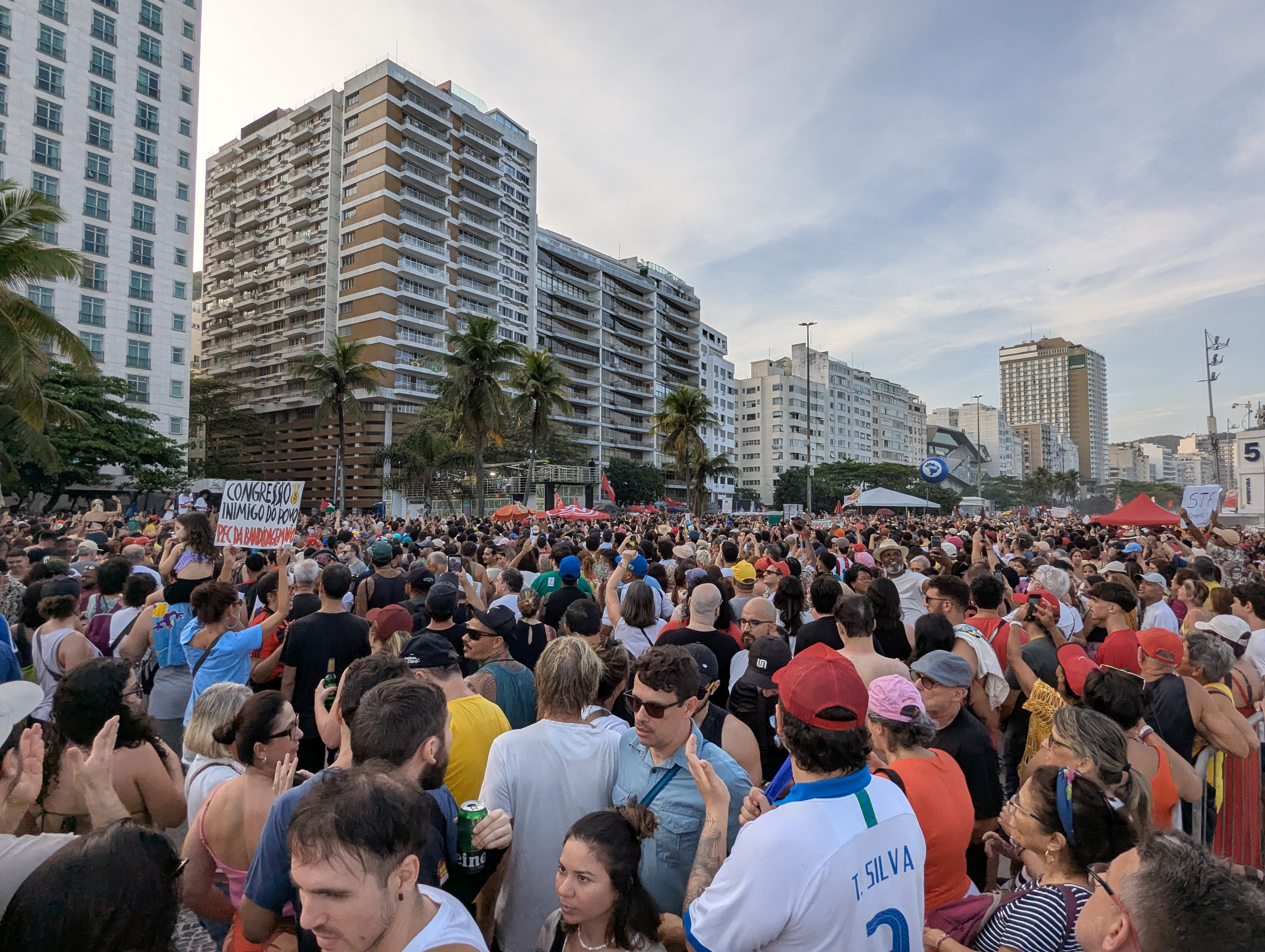
Demonstrations in Copacabana, Rio de Janeiro, on 21 September 2025, against the amnesty project.

Following the Bolsonaro and other officials' conviction, the Brazilian National Congress started to discuss the possibility of amnesty. On 17 September 2025, Congress approved a request of urgency for the project, aiming to speed up the bill's deliberation in the legislative body.

On 21 September 2025, walkouts and demonstrations were staged in all 26 state capitals, Brasília and other cities, gathering thousands of attendees each. These were organized to protest against the amnesty project ("for any political crime committed between October 2022 and the project's approval") and against a constitutional amendment dubbed "Constitutional Amendment of Shielding", which would require Congressional approval before any member of Congress could be prosecuted.

In several of the cities staging protests, music artists participated in the demonstrations and played for the crowd. This was the case of, among others:

- Belo Horizonte, which had Fernanda Takai;
- Brasília, which had Chico César;
- Rio de Janeiro, which had songs played by Maria Gadú, Gilberto Gil, Chico Buarque, Djavan and Caetano Veloso;
- Maceió, which had Simone Mendes;
- Salvador, which had Wagner Moura, Nanda Costa and Daniela Mercury.

=== Arrests ===
The final due date for appeals on the case was on 25 November 2025, after which, having denied all submitted appeals, the Court gave the go-ahead for the convicted to begin serving their sentences.

Bolsonaro had already been detained a few days earlier, on 22 November 2025, for attempting to break his ankle monitor during his house arrest while a vigil had been organized by his son outside his house. The Court believed it to be an attempt at escaping arrest; Bolsonaro alleged he had tried to melt through the ankle monitor with a soldering iron "out of curiosity".

Braga Netto had already been on preventive arrest since 14 December 2024.

Heleno and Nogueira were taken to the Planalto Military Command on 25 November to start serving their sentences.

Ramagem, though having had his passport cancelled after being prohibited from leaving the country, managed to escape to the United States; the Court requested extradition proceedings be initiated by the Federal Police.

== See also ==
- 1964 Brazilian coup d'état
  - ADPF 153 – Supreme Federal Court case on the constitutionality of the Amnesty Law, which exempted from prosecution any and all political crimes committed during the military dictatorship
