= Brazilian submarine Almirante Karam =

Brazilian submarine

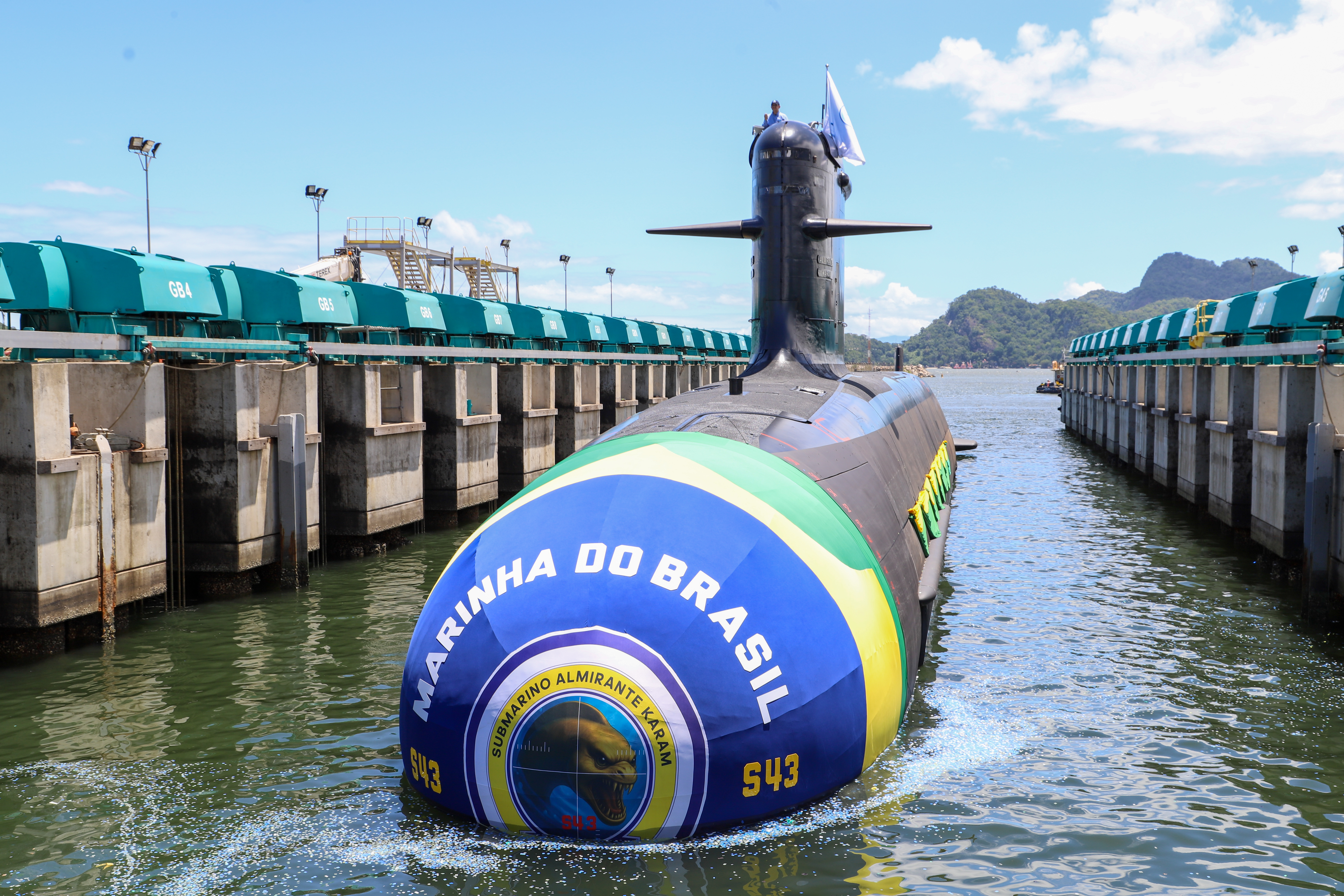
- Almirante Karam

History

Brazil
- Name: Almirante Karam
- Namesake: Admiral Alfredo Karam
- Ordered: 23 December 2008
- Builder: ICN, Madeira Island, Itaguaí
- Launched: 26 November 2025
- Sponsored by: Cármen Lúcia Antunes Rocha
- Homeport: Madeira Island
- Identification: Pennant number: S43
- Status: Sea trials

General characteristics
- Class & type: Riachuelo-class submarine
- Displacement: 1,900 t (1,900 long tons)
- Length: 70.62 m (231 ft 8 in)
- Beam: 6.2 m (20 ft 4 in)
- Draft: 5.8 m (19 ft 0 in)
- Propulsion: 4 × MTU 12V 396 SE84 diesels 1,500 hp (1,119 kW) each; 1 × Jeumont-Schneider EPM Magtronic electric 3,909 hp (2,915 kW); 1 × Shaft; Exide Hagen batteries
- Speed: 21 knots (39 km/h; 24 mph)
- Test depth: 400 m (1,300 ft)
- Complement: 32
- Sensors & processing systems: Naval Group SUBTICS combat management system; Thales TSM 2233 Eledone hull and flank array passive sonar; Thales Safare/S-Cube hull active sonar; Safran Series 20 target identification and classification system
- Electronic warfare & decoys: Thales DR 3000/ITT AR 900 electronic support measures; Naval Group Contralto-S decoy launchers; CANTO anti-torpedo countermeasures
- Armament: 6 × 533 mm (21 in) torpedo tubes: 8 × SM39 Exocet anti-ship missiles; 18 × F21 heavy-weight torpedoes; 30 × naval mines
- Notes: Sources:

Almirante Karam (S43) —previously known as Angostura— is the fourth unit of the Riachuelo-class submarines built for the Brazilian Navy by ICN in Itaguaí, and DCNS, a modified design of the original French Scorpène class.

The Brazilian boats are larger in length, tonnage and cargo capacity compared to the original French project. The Brazilian version are 70.62 m (231 ft 8 in) and 1,900 tons, compared to the original Scorpènes that are 61.7 m (202 ft 5 in) and 1,565 tons. The submarine was launched on 26 November 2025, sponsored by Supreme Court justice, Cármen Lúcia Antunes Rocha.

== Program history ==
In 2008, Brazil purchased four enlarged Scorpènes for USD 10 billion with a total technology transfer agreement and a second agreement to develop the first Brazilian nuclear-powered submarine, Álvaro Alberto. The hull of Riachuelo was laid down at Cherbourg, France on 27 May 2010 and it was jumboized at the Brazilian Navy Shipyard in Itaguaí in late 2012.

The first submarine Riachuelo was launched on 14 December 2018, the Humaitá was launched on 11 December 2020, and the Tonelero on 27 March 2024.

== Namesake ==
Almirante Karam was named after the former Admiral Alfredo Karam.
