= Manuel Antônio Farinha, Count of Sousel =

Brazilian admiral

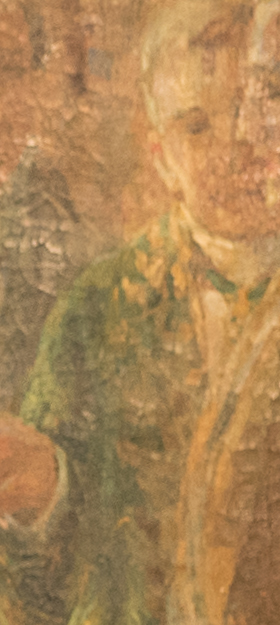
- Born: 18th century Sousel (Kingdom of Portugal)
- Died: 27 May 1842; Rio de Janeiro (Empire of Brazil)
- Alma mater: Navy Royal Academy
- Awards: Order of the Rose (1827)
- Position held: Minister of the Navy (1822–1822)
- Rank: graduate admiral (1827–)
- Branch: Imperial Brazilian Navy (1822–1832), Portuguese Navy (1793–1822)
- Titles: Baron of Souzel (1825–), Count of Souzel (1826–), Grandee

Manuel Antônio Farinha, first and only baron and count of Sousel (? – 27 May 1842) was a Brazilian admiral.

He was minister of the Navy in the first cabinet of Dom Pedro I, formeid on 16 January 1822, until 22 October 1822.

He was made baron on 12 October 1825 and count on 12 October 1826. Also was Grandee of the Empire.

Military offices
Preceded by -	Minister of the Navy of Brazil; 1822	Followed by Luís da Cunha Moreira
