= Mauro Cid =

Brazilian army lieutenant colonel

Lieutenant colonel Mauro Cid
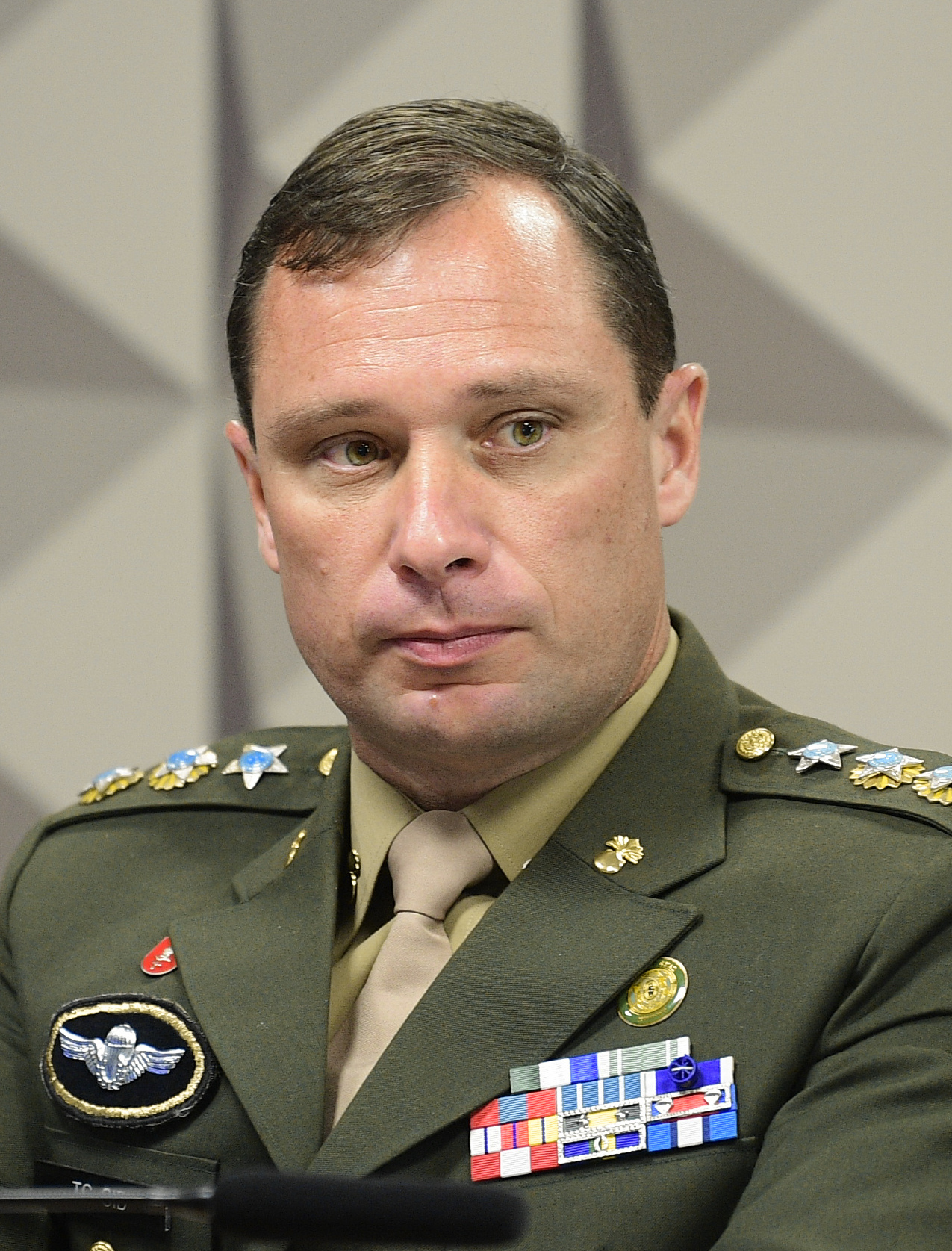
- Born: Mauro Cesar Barbosa Cid; 17 May 1979 (age 47); Niterói, Rio de Janeiro, Brazil
- Military career
- Allegiance: Brazil
- Branch: Brazilian Army
- Service years: 1996–present
- Rank: Lieutenant colonel
- Unit: Land Operations Command
- Criminal information
- Known for: 2022 Brazilian coup plot Bolsonaro's Saudi jewelry Digital militias
- Status: In house arrest
- Convictions: Attempted violent abolition of the democratic rule of law; Attempted coup d'état; Participation in an armed criminal organization; Qualified damage; Deterioration of protected heritage property
- Trial: Trial for the 2022–2023 Brazilian coup plot (8 – 11 September 2025)
- Penalty: 2 years in house arrest

Mauro Cesar Barbosa Cid (Note: Portuguese pronunciation: [ˈmaw.ɾu seˈza(ʁ) baʁˈbɔ.zɐ ˈsid]) (born May 17, 1979) is an active-duty lieutenant colonel in the Brazilian Army. He was an aide-de-camp to the President of Brazil, Jair Bolsonaro, and is currently being investigated by the Federal Police of Brazil for several crimes in which he is accused of having participated during the Bolsonaro government.

== Personal life ==
He is the son of the reserve army general Mauro Cesar Lourena Cid.

He is married to Gabriela Cid and has three daughters.

== Career ==
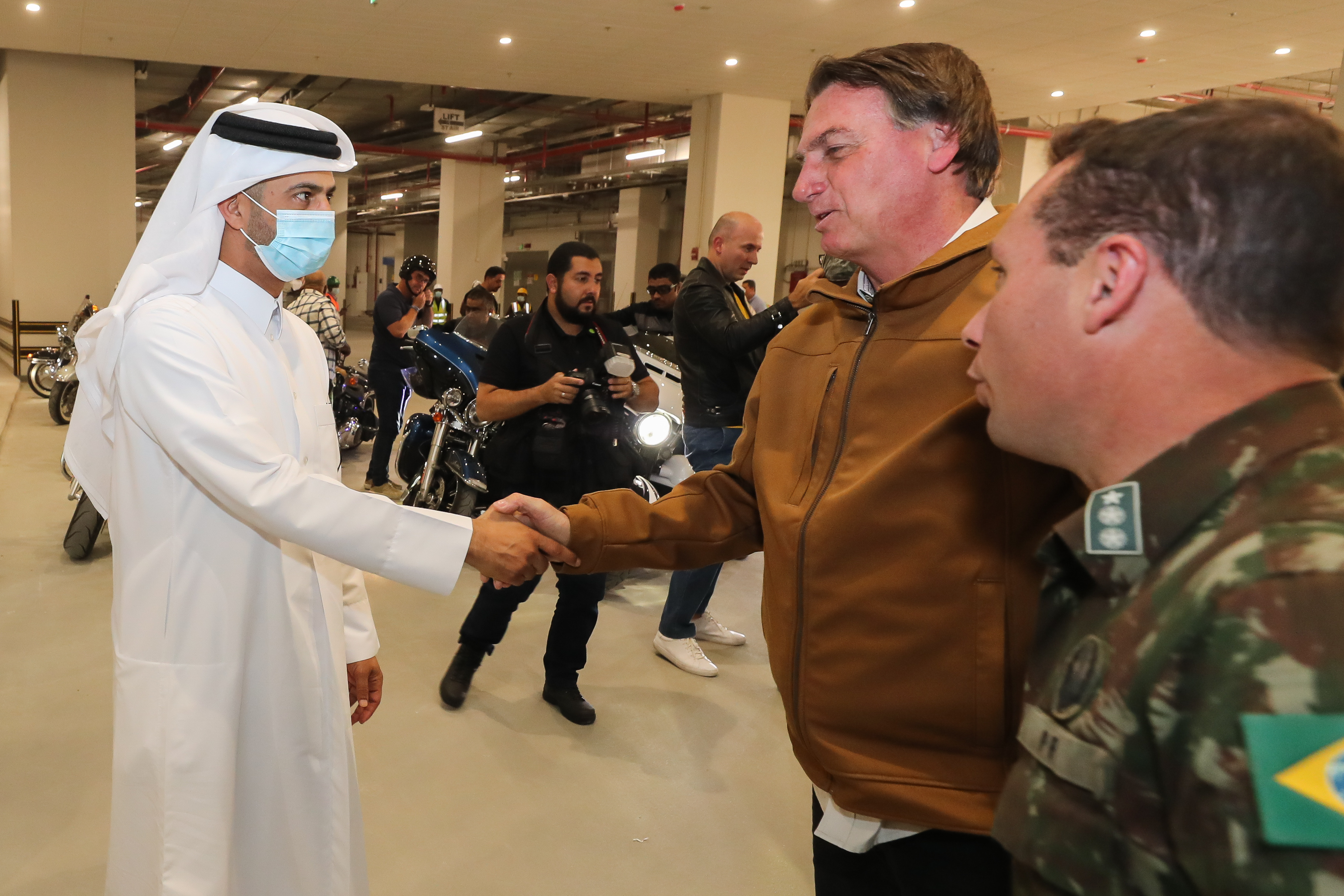
Cid (right) next to then President Jair Bolsonaro during a visit to Lusail Stadium, in Qatar (2021)

He joined the army in 1996, graduating from Academia Militar das Agulhas Negras in 2000. He followed the career of someone who aspires to become a general, studying in several military courses, such as the General Staff Command School, ranking among the best in his class.

Under the Bolsonaro administration, he was appointed aide to the president as he prepared to take up a position abroad. He took office in 2018, during the transition of government.

He became a lieutenant colonel in 2022.

At the end of the Bolsonaro administration, Cid planned to continue his career commanding an army battalion in Goiânia. President Lula asked Defence Minister José Múcio Monteiro to repeal his appointment.

Army commander Júlio Cesar de Arruda was fired for not complying with the order, so Cid made a request for a command amendment, and on 24 January 2023, Tomás Paiva, the new commander, transferred him to an administrative position in the direction of the Army Land Operations Command.

On 3 May he was preventively arrested by the Federal Police of Brazil in Operation Venire, on suspicion of fraud in the Conecte SUS. He was summoned to testify at the 8 January CPMI on 13 July, but he remained silent, including questions unrelated to the prosecution, such as his date of birth. Therefore, the CPMI sued the Federal Court of the Federal District and the Supreme Federal Court for abuse of the right to remain silent.

== Criminal investigations ==
=== Tax crimes ===
Cid is investigated by the Federal Police for misuse of corporate cards of the Presidency.

=== Saudi jewelry ===
Mauro Cid was accused of trying to remove Saudi jewels, gifts from the government of Saudi Arabia found in the suitcase of an advisor from the Ministry of Mines and Energy, from the customs at Guarulhos International Airport, which were retained because they had been declared to the Federal Revenue as an item staff, exempting them from taxes. He signed a letter on December 28, 2022, asking for the "incorporation of assets into the public collection of the Presidency of the Republic". However, in a statement to the Federal Police, Army 2nd Lieutenant Cleiton Hozschuck, Mauro Cid's subordinate, stated that the jewels were destined for the personal collection of the President of the Republic, Jair Bolsonaro, a scenario reinforced by Federal Police orders. That document also states that the jewelry was go to Jair Bolsonaro. Also, Marcelo da Silva Vieira, head of the Deputy Cabinet for Historical Documentation, stated that he received a call from Cid saying that he would receive a series of information so that the gift could be delivered to the president. He also urgently asked for a Brazilian Air Force plane to take Sergeant Jairo Moreira da Silva to pick up the jewels in São Paulo.

=== Digital militias ===
Mauro Cid was appointed as a member of the digital militias in an investigation by the Federal Police into Bolsonaro's livestreaming, where the president linked COVID-19 vaccines with HIV. He was also responsible for disclosing data about the hacker attack on the Federal Supreme Court.

Cid and five other people were arrested on May 3, 2023 in the Federal Police's Operation Venire on suspicion of fraud in the Conecte SUS. The group purportedly forged the data of Jair and Laura Bolsonaro, Cid himself and his family on December 21, 2022, with the aim of guaranteeing entry into the United States, which required vaccination against COVID-19 to enter the country. His wife traveled to the US three times with a fraudulent vaccination card. A search warrant was also carried out at Mauro Cid's house, where US$ 35,000 and R$ 16,000 in cash were seized. In addition, his cell phone was examined and bank transactions were found in an account in the United States. His defense team stated that the money came from services provided abroad, and that military personnel who performed this type of service had a Bank of Brazil account opened in Miami.

=== Attempted coup d'état ===
According to the Federal Police, between April and May 2022, Cid exchanged messages with exiled journalist Allan dos Santos, discussing the need for a military coup. On May 31, amid discussions between protests by anti-fascist groups against Bolsonaro, Cid classified the movements as "terrorist guerrillas", and that "we are returning to 68, but now with media support".

On December 15, Cid exchanged audios with former Major Ailton Barros, "Bolsonaro's 01", where they would try to pressure Army commander Marco Antônio Freire Gomes so that "he does what he has to do". The audios are being analyzed by the Federal Police of Brazil.

Also, according to journalist Andréia Sadi, from G1, Cid heard coup proposals from a former minister of Bolsonaro and Daniel Silveira.

An investigation carried out by the PF on his cell phone revealed a series of documents and conversations that would prove Mauro Cid's participation in a plan to carry out a coup d'état. Among the documents were a draft of Garantia da Lei e da Ordem (GLO) and negotiations for the enactment of a State of emergency. Because of the revelations made by the PF, the summoning of Mauro Cid became a priority in the CPMI do Golpe.

=== Defense ===
Initially, he was represented by Rodrigo Roca, Flávio Bolsonaro's former lawyer in the "rachadinhas" case, but Cid's family assessed that he was more interested in protecting the Bolsonaro family than Cid, so they replaced him with Bernardo Fenelon, a specialist in plea bargains for whistleblowers who worked in Operation Lava Jato.
