= Fernando Azevedo e Silva =

Brazilian politician

General Fernando Azevedo e Silva
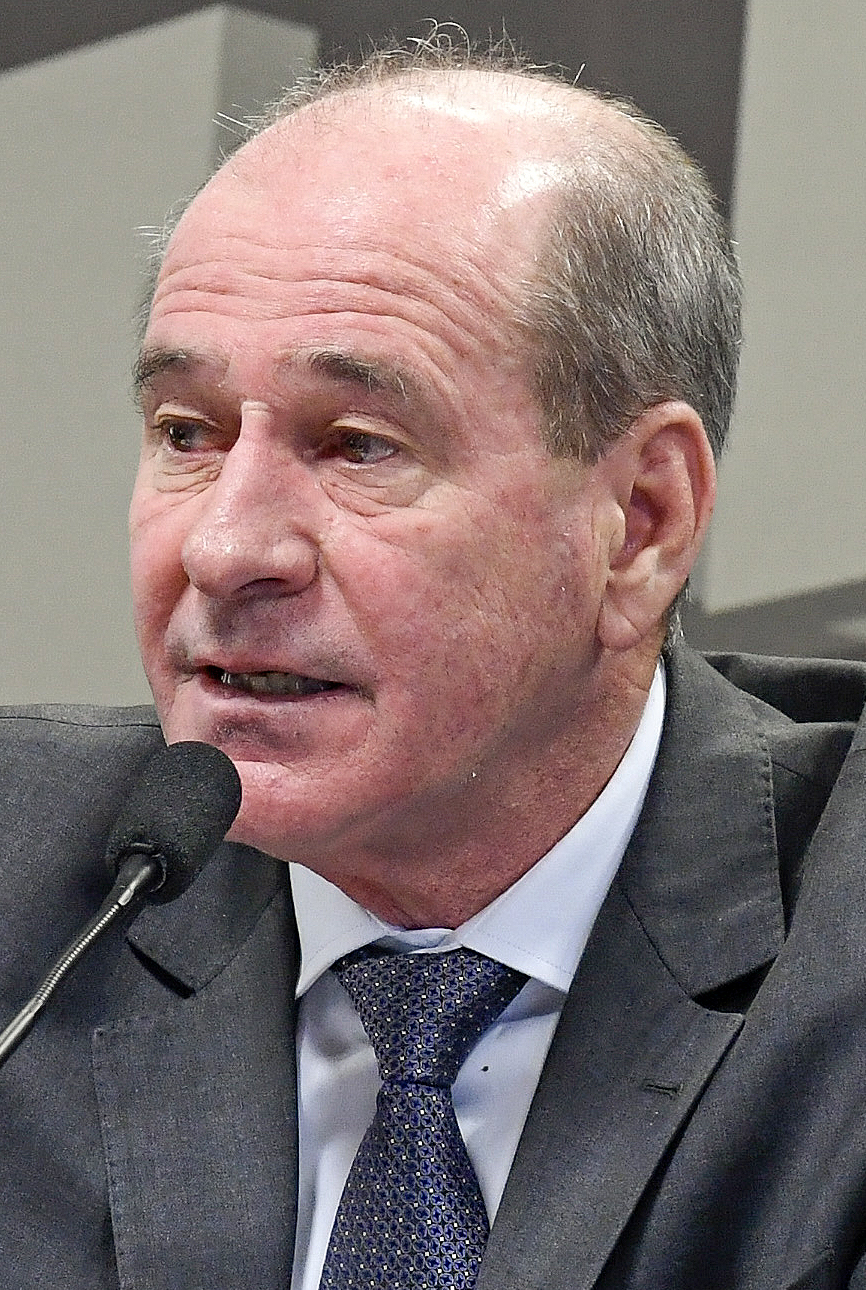

Minister of Defence
- In office 1 January 2019 – 29 March 2021
- President: Jair Bolsonaro
- Preceded by: Joaquim Silva e Luna
- Succeeded by: Walter Souza Braga Netto

Personal details
- Born: 4 February 1954 (age 72) Rio de Janeiro, Brazil
- Education: Agulhas Negras Military Academy; Escola de Comando e Estado-Maior do Exército

Military service
- Allegiance: Brazil
- Branch/service: Brazilian Army
- Years of service: 1973–2018
- Rank: General
- Commands: Eastern Military Command; Paratroopers Brigade

Fernando Azevedo e Silva (born 4 February 1954) is a Brazilian politician and reserve army general. He served as the Brazilian Minister of Defence during the first half of President Jair Bolsonaro's term from January 2019 to March 2021.

He graduated as Infantry officer on December 14, 1976, at the Academia Militar das Agulhas Negras, and was promoted to Army general (four-star rank) on July 31, 2014.

He was assistant to Supreme Federal Court Chief Justice Dias Toffoli. On 13 November 2018, he was named by President-elect Jair Bolsonaro as his choice for Minister of Defence, replacing previous nominee Augusto Heleno, who was instead named as head of the Institutional Security Office. On March 29, 2021, Azevedo resigned along with the five other ministers.

Political offices
Preceded by Joaquim Silva e Luna	Minister of Defence; 2019–21	Succeeded by Walter Souza Braga Netto
