= Marcos Antonio Amaro dos Santos =

Commander of the Brazilian Army

General Marcos Antonio Amaro dos Santos
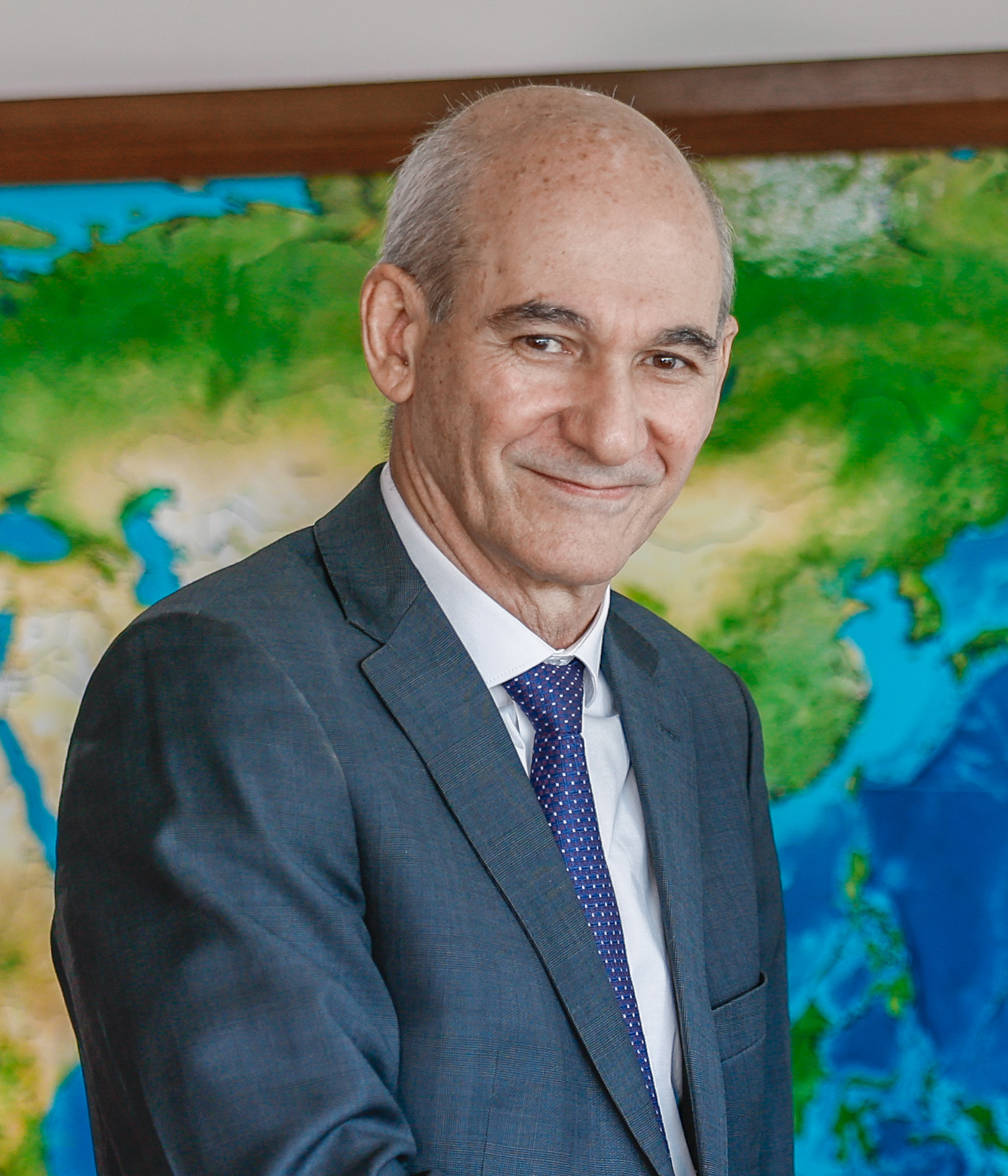
- Amaro dos Santos in 2023

Head of Institutional Security Cabinet
- Incumbent
- Assumed office 4 May 2023
- President: Luiz Inácio Lula da Silva
- Preceded by: Ricardo Cappelli (interim)

Chief of the Brazilian Army General Staff
- In office 31 March 2020 – 31 March 2022
- President: Jair Bolsonaro
- Minister of Defence: Walter Souza Braga Netto
- Preceded by: Walter Souza Braga Netto
- Succeeded by: Valério Stumpf Trindade

Commander of the Southeastern Military Region
- In office 31 July 2019 – 30 March 2020
- Minister: Fernando Azevedo e Silva
- Commander: Edson Leal Pujol
- Preceded by: Luiz Eduardo Ramos
- Succeeded by: Eduardo Antonio Fernandes

Chief of the Military House
- In office 2 October 2015 – 19 May 2016
- President: Dilma Rousseff
- Preceded by: José Elito Carvalho Siqueira (Note: as Chief Minister of Institutional Security Cabinet)
- Succeeded by: Sérgio Etchegoyen (Note: as Chief Minister of Institutional Security Cabinet)

Commander of the Brazilian Army (interim)
- In office 1 February 2021 – 4 February 2021
- In office 22 April 2022 – 29 April 2022

Personal details
- Born: 25 September 1957 (age 68) Motuca, São Paulo, Brazil

Military service
- Allegiance: Brazil
- Branch/service: Brazilian Army
- Years of service: 1974–2022
- Rank: Army general
- Commands: EsPCEx; 13th Motorized Infantry Brigade; 3rd Army Division; Economy and Finance Secretariat; Southeastern Military Command; Brazilian Army General Staff

Marcos Antonio Amaro dos Santos (born 25 September 1957) is a Brazilian Army general and former Chief of the Brazilian Army General Staff, replacing General Walter Souza Braga Netto.

== Military career ==
He started his military career on 4 March 1974, at the Brazilian Army Preparatory School for Cadets (EsPCEx). Was promoted to major on 31 August 1993. Reached to the last post in the military as Army General on 31 March 2018.

Amaro already occupied the post of Chief of the Military House of the Presidency between 2 October 2015 and 19 May 2016. Other posts were as Army's Secretary of Economy and Finance as well the Southeastern Military Region command between 31 July 2019 and 30 March 2020. On 31 March 2020, he was named Chief of the Brazilian Army General Staff by president Jair Bolsonaro. Left office after 2 years in office after being transferred to military reserve force. Also held, the position of interim Commander of the Brazilian Army between 1–4 February 2021 and 22–29 April 2022. On 3 May 2023, he was named Chief Minister of Institutional Security Cabinet by president Luiz Inácio Lula da Silva.

== Notes ==
Military offices
Preceded by Luiz Eduardo Ramos	Commander of the Southeastern Military Region; 2019–20	Succeeded by Eduardo Antonio Fernandes
Preceded by Walter Souza Braga Netto	Chief of the Brazilian Army General Staff; 2020–22	Succeeded by Valério Stumpf Trindade
Political offices
Preceded by Ricardo Cappelli (acting)	Head of the Institutional Security Bureau; 2023–present	Incumbent
Order of precedence
Preceded by Ministers of State	Brazilian order of precedence 11th in line as Head of the Institutional Security Bureau	Followed by Rui Costa as Chief of Staff
