= National Defense Council (Brazil) =

- Portuguese: Conselho de Defesa Nacional

Council overview
- Formed: 29 November 1927; 98 years ago
- Jurisdiction: Brazil
- Council executives: Pres. Luiz Inácio Lula da Silva, Chairman; Marcos Antonio Amaro dos Santos, Executive-Secretary
- Website: www.gov.br/gsi

The National Defense Council (CDN) (Portuguese: Conselho de Defesa Nacional) is a consultative body of the President of Brazil on matters of national security, foreign policy, and defence strategy. The Council was established on 29 November 1927 by President Washington Luís. It is composed of key ministers and military commanders and chaired by the President of Brazil.

== History ==
The National Defense Council was established by Decree no. 17,999 of 29 November 1927, and organized by Decree no. 23,873 of 15 February 1934. It was chaired by the President and composed of several ministers, the Chief of Staff of the Army, the Chief of Staff of the Navy and in wartime, by generals and admirals of certain commands. It had as complementary organs, the National Defense Studies Commission, the General Secretariat of National Defense, and national defense sectors in every government ministry.

The role of the National Defense Council was reaffirmed with the promulgation of the Constitution of 1934. In the portion devoted to national security (Article 162), the National Defense Council was renamed National Security Council. The decree-law no. 900 of 29 September 1969, amended some provisions of decree-law no. 200, and the National Security Council became the "highest-level advisory board to the president of the Republic, in formulating and implementing national security policy". In September 1980, a presidential decree established the internal regulations of the CSN.

The new Constitution ratified in 1988, renamed the National Security Council to National Defense Council.

== Responsibilities ==
The National Defense Council is responsible for advising the President in the event of declaring war or establishing peace, in decreeing state of defense, state of siege or federal intervention; and proposing the criteria and conditions for use of the areas essential to the security of national territory and opine on their effective use, especially in the border and matters related to the preservation and exploitation of natural resources of any kind; as well as studying, proposing and monitoring the development of measures required to guarantee national independence and defense of democratic State.

The Council draws up crucial documents defining conceptual approaches to national security. Regular meetings of the Council are held according to a schedule set by the President; if necessary, the Council can hold extraordinary meetings. The Chairman defines the agenda and order of the day based on recommendations by the Executive Secretary of the Council. The Chairman presides over meetings, while the Secretary holds working meetings with Council members on a regular basis.

== Composition ==
The National Defense Council is headed by the President of Brazil and composed of the following members:

Structure of the National Defense Council (Current)
Chair	Luiz Inácio Lula da Silva (President of Brazil)
Executive Secretary	Gen. Marcos Antonio Amaro dos Santos (Chief Minister of the Institutional Security Cabinet)
Statutory Members	Geraldo Alckmin (Vice President of Brazil); Arthur Lira (President of the Chamber of Deputies); Rodrigo Pacheco (President of the Federal Senate); José Múcio (Minister of Defense); Wellington Lima e Silva (Minister of Justice and Public Security); Mauro Vieira (Minister of Foreign Affairs); Simone Tebet (Minister of Planning and Budget)
Military Advisors	Adm. Renato Rodrigues de Aguiar Freire (Chief of the Joint Staff of the Armed Forces); Adm. Marcos Sampaio Olsen (Commander of the Navy); Gen. Tomás Miguel Ribeiro Paiva (Army Commander); Lt. Brig. Marcelo Kanitz Damasceno (Air Force Commander)
Additional Participants	The President may appoint additional participants when appropriate.
