= General Luna =

General Luna may refer to:

== Municipalities in the Philippines ==
- General Luna, Quezon
- General Luna, Surigao del Norte

== People ==
- Antonio Luna (1866–1899), general of the Philippine–American War, for whom the municipalities are named
- Joaquim Silva e Luna (born 1949), retired four-star general of the Brazilian Army
- Cardozo Luna (born 1953), retired three-star general of the Armed Forces of the Philippines

== Popular culture ==
- Heneral Luna, 2015 film depicting Antonio Luna
- General Luna (band), all female Filipino rock band

== Others ==
- General Luna Street
