= Marco Edson Gonçalves Dias =

Brazilian general and government minister (born 1950)

Gonçalves Dias
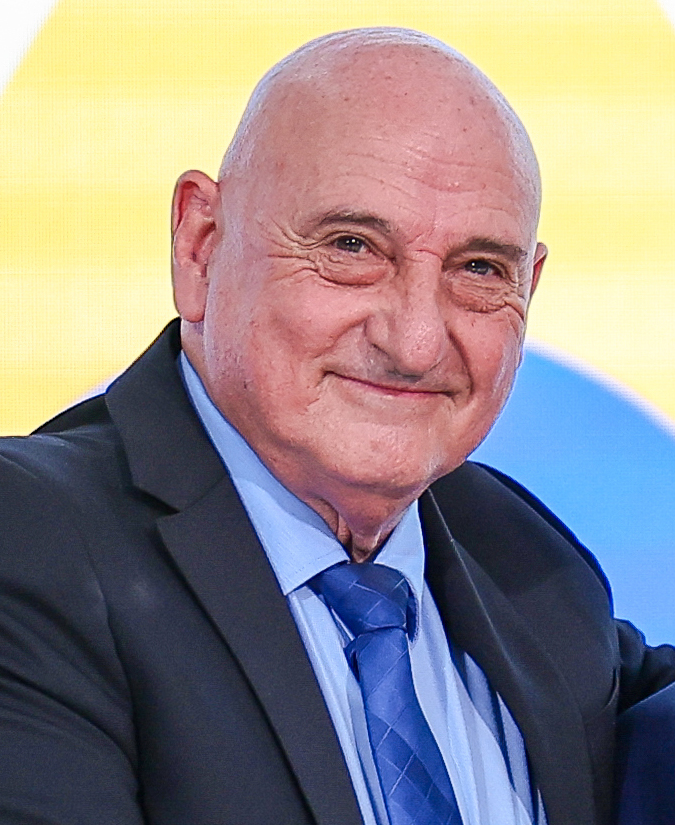
- Gonçalves Dias on 1 January 2023

Secretary of Institutional Security
- In office 1 January 2023 – 19 April 2023
- President: Luiz Inácio Lula da Silva
- Preceded by: Augusto Heleno
- Succeeded by: Ricardo Cappelli (interim)

Personal details
- Born: Marco Edson Gonçalves Dias; 7 February 1950 (age 76) Americana, São Paulo, Brazil
- Education: Brazilian Army Command and General Staff School
- Profession: Military

Military service
- Allegiance: Brazil
- Branch/service: Brazilian Army
- Years of service: 1969–2012
- Rank: Divisional general
- Commands: 6th Military Region; 19th Motorized Infantry Battalion
- Awards: Order of Rio Branco (Commander); Order of Naval Merit; Order of Military Merit; Order of Aeronautical Merit; Order of Defence Merit; Medal of the Pacifier

Marco Edson Gonçalves Dias (born 7 February 1950 in Americana), also known as G. Dias, is a retired divisional general of the Brazilian Army. He was the head of the Institutional Security Bureau.

== Biography ==
Born in Americana, São Paulo, Dias joined the Army in February 1969 by the Brazilian Army Preparatory School of Cadets (EsPCEx). He attended the Officials Enhancement School (EsAO) in 1986, continuing his graduation at the Brazilian Army Command and General Staff School (ECEME), in 1994. Dias headed the 6th Military Region and commanded the 19th Motorized Infantry Battalion, based in São Leopoldo, between January 1999 and January 2001. He served as military observer at the service of the United Nations in a mission in Central America. Dias is a retired Brazilian Army general, after more than 30 years in this Armed Forces branch. Dias worked in the personal security team of president Luiz Inácio Lula da Silva during his first two terms, between 2003 and 2009. During the presidency of Dilma Rousseff, Gonçalves Dias was head of the Institutional Security Coordination.

In 2012, during his command of the 6th Military Region, Gonçalves Dias was involved in a controversy after meeting with police officers strikers of Bahia, who gave him a birthday cake, ensuring the officer that nothing would happen to them. He was suspended from office and retired months later.

Gonçalves Dias worked with Lula personal security again in 2022. He was part of the transition team for the third Lula administration, as member of the responsible group for strategic intelligence. On 29 December 2022, Gonçalves Dias was announced as head of the Institutional Security Bureau of the third Lula government. On 19 April 2023, Gonçalves Dias resigned after a report by CNN Brasil revealed a video in which he guided Bolsonaro's supporters inside the Planalto Palace during the events of the Brazilian Congress attack.

Political offices
| Preceded by Augusto Heleno | Head of the Institutional Security Bureau; 2023 | Succeeded by Ricardo Cappelli (interim) |
