= Joaquim Silva e Luna =

Brazilian politician (born 1949)

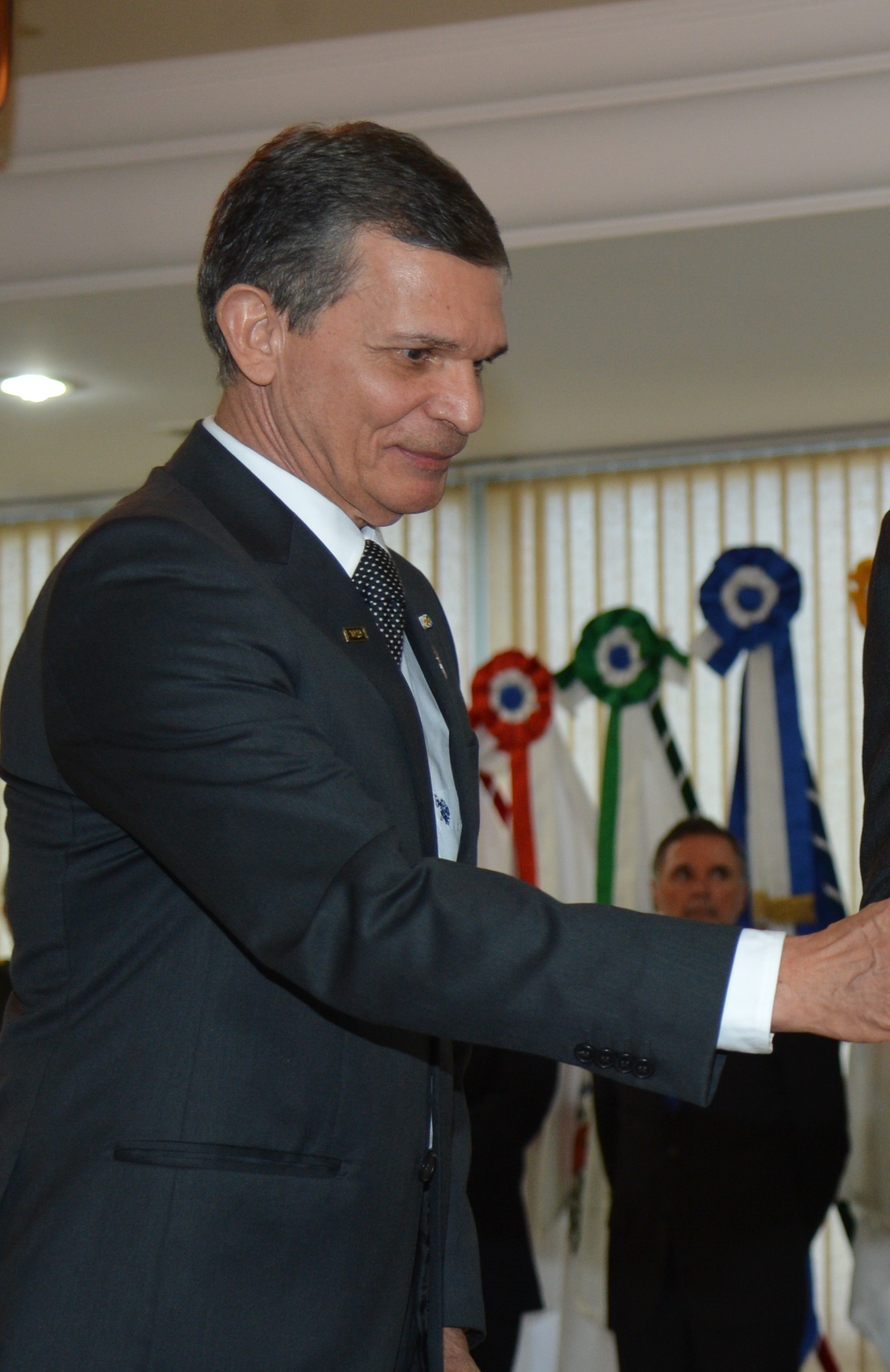
- Silva e Luna in 2015

Mayor of Foz do Iguaçu
- Incumbent
- Assumed office 1 January 2025
- Vice Mayor: Ricardo Nascimento
- Preceded by: Chico Brasileiro

President of Petrobras
- In office 16 April 2021 – 28 March 2022
- Appointed by: Jair Bolsonaro
- Preceded by: Roberto Castello Branco
- Succeeded by: José Mauro Ferreira Coelho

Director-General of Itaipu Binacional
- In office 26 February 2019 – 7 April 2021
- Appointed by: Jair Bolsonaro
- Preceded by: Marcos Vitorio Stamm
- Succeeded by: João Francisco Ferreira

Minister of Defence
- In office 26 February 2018 – 1 January 2019
- President: Michel Temer
- Preceded by: Raul Jungmann
- Succeeded by: Fernando Azevedo e Silva

Chief of Staff of the Brazilian Army
- In office 10 May 2011 – 10 April 2014
- Minister: Nelson Jobim; Celso Amorim
- Preceded by: Marius Teixeira Neto
- Succeeded by: Adhemar da Costa Machado Filho

Personal details
- Born: 10 December 1949 (age 76) Barreiros, Pernambuco, Brazil
- Party: PL (2024–present)
- Other political affiliations: Republicanos (2023–2024)
- Education: Agulhas Negras Military Academy; Brazilian Army Command and General Staff School

Military service
- Allegiance: Brazil
- Branch/service: Brazilian Army
- Years of service: 1969–2014
- Rank: General
- Commands: 6th Battalion of Construction Engineering; 16th Infantry Brigadier of the Wild
- Awards: Order of Defence Merit; Order of Military Merit

Joaquim Silva e Luna (born 10 December 1949, in Barreiros, Pernambuco), is a Brazilian politician and former Brazilian Army general who served as Minister of Defence from February 2018 until January 2019.

== Biography ==
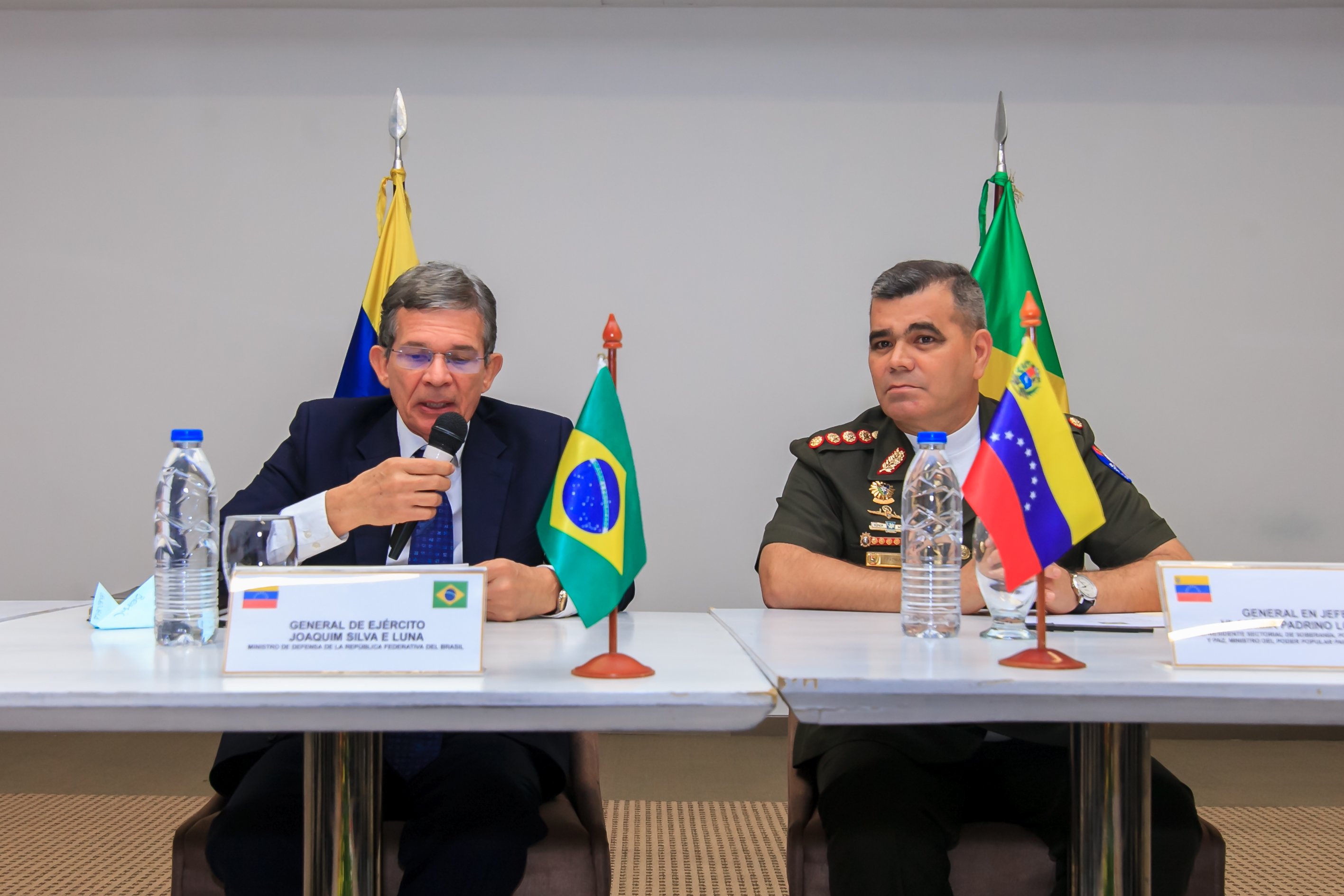
With Venezuelan Defense Minister Vladimir Padrino Lopez.

He began his military career on February 10, 1969, in the Academia Militar das Agulhas Negras. He graduates lieutenant of Engineering on December 16, 1972.

He was promoted to 1st lieutenant on August 31, 1975, and to captain on August 31, 1978. In this period, he realized the specialization courses of Communications (1976) and Jungle Expert (1979). He also made the advanced course of Engineering in 1981. He worked many years in the construction Battalions of the Army.

Promoted to major in August, 1985, he studied in the Escola de Comando e Estado-Maior do Exército (Brazil) in 1987 and 1988. Later, was promoted to lieutenant colonel on April 30, 1990, and was Engineering advisor in Paraguay, between 1992 and 1994.

Colonel on April 30, 1995, he commanded the 6th Construction Engineering Battalion in Boa Vista, Roraima, between 1996 and 1998. Later, he returned to the Escola de Comando e Estado-Maior do Exército (Brazil) to realize the Political and Strategic Course. He was military attaché in Israel from 1999 to 2001.

He was promoted to major general on March 31, 2002, and designated to command the 16th Jungle Infantry Brigade, located in Tefé - Amazonas, between 2002 and 2004. Later he was the director of Patrimony of the Army, being promoted to lieutenant general on March 31, 2006.

He was the Chief of Cabinet from the Brazilian Army Commander, General Enzo Martins Peri, from 2007 to March 31, 2011, when was promoted to four-star general. Between May 10, 2011, and April 10, 2014, he was Brazilian Army Chief of Staff.

After his retirement from active duty, he was nominated as Personnel, Education, Health and Sports Secretary of the Ministry of Defence (Brazil). On October 26, he became Secretary-General of the Ministry.

He was the first military man designated as Minister of Defence since its creation in 1999, and the 11th person to assume that function.

In February 2021, President Jair Bolsonaro fired Roberto Castello Branco and appointed Silva e Luna as the next President of the Brazilian state oil company Petrobras.

=== Dates of rank ===
Promotions
Rank	Date
Aspirant	16 December 1972
2nd Lieutenant	31 August 1973
1st Lieutenant	31 August 1975
Captain	31 August 1978
Major	31 August 1985
Lieutenant Colonel	30 April 1990
Colonel	30 April 1995
Brigade general	31 March 2002
Divisional general	31 March 2006
Army general	31 March 2011

== Recognitions and honors ==
Brazilian military decorations
Order of Defence Merit (Grand Cross)
Order of Military Merit (Grand Cross)

Military offices
Preceded by Marius Teixeira Neto	Chief of Staff of the Brazilian Army; 2011–2014	Succeeded by Adhemar da Costa Machado Filho
Political offices
Preceded by Raul Jungmann	Minister of Defence; 2018–2019	Succeeded by Fernando Azevedo e Silva
Preceded by Chico Brasileiro	Mayor of Foz do Iguaçu; 2025–present	Incumbent
Government offices
Preceded by Marcos Vitorio Stamm	Director-General of Itaipu Binacional; 2019–2021	Succeeded by João Francisco Ferreira
Business positions
Preceded by Roberto Castello Branco	President of Petrobras; 2021–2022	Succeeded by José Mauro Ferreira Coelho
