= Augusto Heleno =

Brazilian politician (born 1947)

General Augusto Heleno
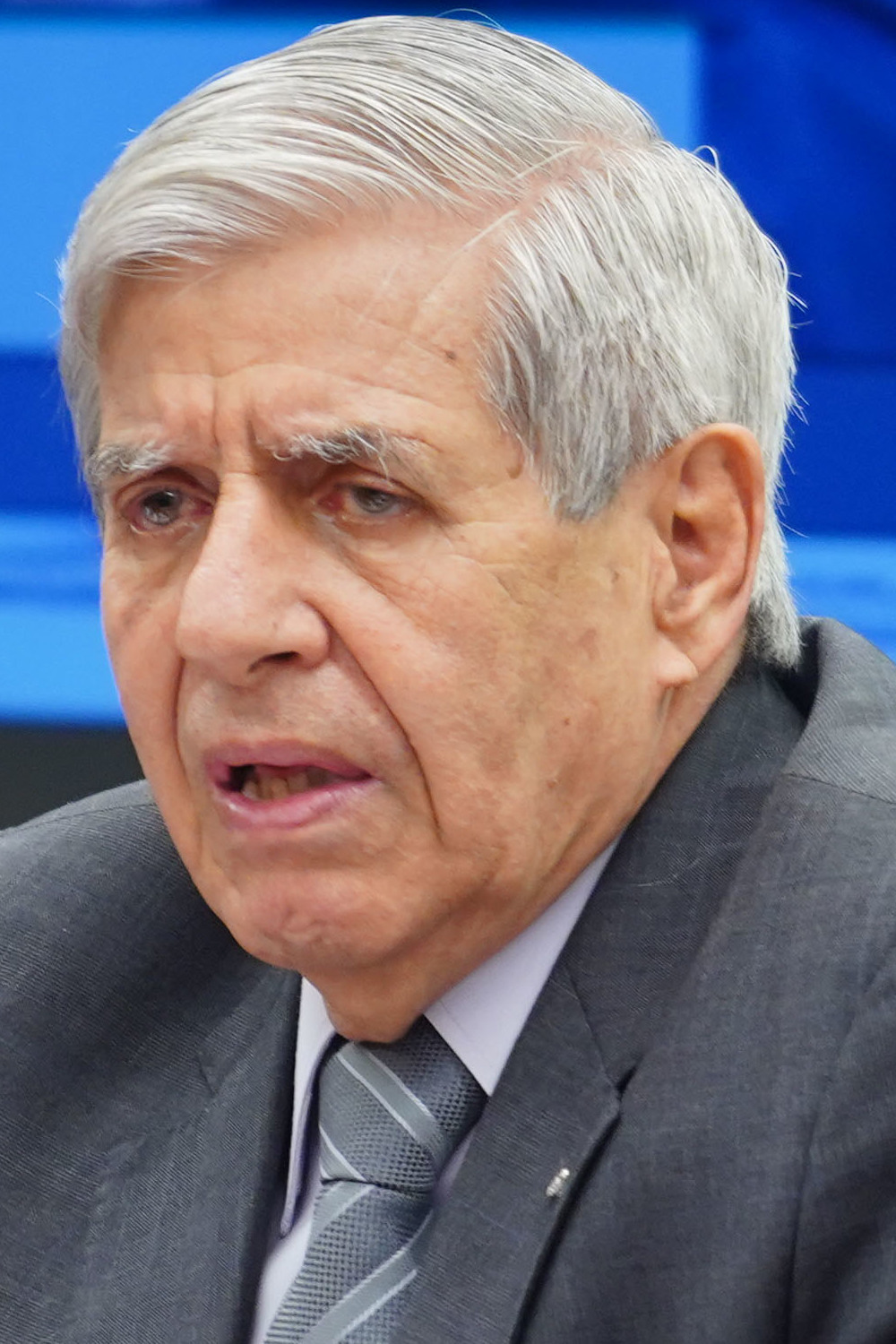

Secretary of Institutional Security
- In office 1 January 2019 – 1 January 2023
- President: Jair Bolsonaro
- Preceded by: Sérgio Etchegoyen
- Succeeded by: Gonçalves Dias

Amazon Military Commander
- In office 14 September 2007 – 6 April 2009
- Preceded by: Raymundo Nonato de Cerqueira Filho
- Succeeded by: Luis Carlos Gomes Mattos

Commander of MINUSTAH
- In office 31 May 2004 – 1 September 2005
- Head: Juan Gabriel Valdés
- Succeeded by: Urano Teixeira da Matta Bacellar

Commander of EsPCEx
- In office 1994–1996
- Preceded by: Francisco Ronald da Silva Nogueira
- Succeeded by: Mário de Oliveira Seixas

Personal details
- Born: Augusto Heleno Ribeiro Pereira; 29 October 1947 (age 78) Curitiba, Paraná, Brazil
- Party: PRD (Since 2023)
- Other political affiliations: PRP (2018); PATRI (2018–2023)
- Spouse: Sônia Pereira
- Children: Renata; Mário Márcio
- Parents: Ari de Oliveira Pereira (father); Edina Ribeiro (mother)
- Occupation: Military
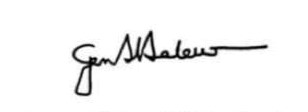
- Signature

Military service
- Allegiance: Brazil
- Branch/service: Brazilian Army
- Years of service: 1966–2011
- Rank: General
- Commands: Preparatory School for Army Cadets; 5th Armored Cavalry Brigade; Army Physical Capacity Center; United Nations Stabilisation Mission in Haiti; Amazon Military Command; Department of Science and Technology
- Awards: Order of Military Merit (Grand Cross - Grã-Cruz); Order of Naval Merit (Grand Officer) (Note: Portuguese: Ordem do Mérito Naval - Grande-Oficial); Order of Aeronautical Merit (Grand Officer) (Note: Portuguese: Ordem do Mérito Aeronáutico - Grande-Oficial); Order of Aeronautical Merit (Grand Cross) (Note: Portuguese: Ordem do Mérito Aeronáutico - Grã-Cruz); Peacemaker Medal (Note: Portuguese: Medalha do Pacificador); Order of Rio Branco (Grand Cross - Grã-Cruz); United Nations Medal (MINUSTAH - Haiti); Order of Labour Judiciary Merit (Grand Cross - Grã Cruz); Order of Military Judiciary Merit (High Distinction); Marshal Hermes Medal
- Criminal information
- Status: In prison
- Convictions: Attempted violent abolition of the democratic rule of law; Attempted coup d'état; Participation in an armed criminal organization; Qualified damage; Deterioration of protected heritage property
- Trial: Trial for the 2022–2023 Brazilian coup plot (8 – 11 September 2025)
- Penalty: 21 years in prison

Details
- Date apprehended: 25 November 2025
- Imprisoned at: House arrest

Augusto Heleno Ribeiro Pereira (Note: Portuguese pronunciation: [awˈɡus.tu eˈlẽ.nu ʁiˈbe(j).ɾu peˈɾe(j).ɾɐ]) (born 29 October 1947) is a Brazilian politician and retired general of the Brazilian Army. He was military commander of the Amazon and Chief of the Department of Science and Technology of the Army. Heleno has declared positions against official politics, particularly about the attitude of the international community in regards to Haiti and the indigenous politics of the Brazilian government.

During Jair Bolsonaro presidential campaign of 2018, Bolsonaro invited Heleno Pereira to be his running mate in the election, but his party refused. The general was then invited for Minister of Defence of Bolsonaro's government. However, the nominated minister stepped back and was chosen for the Institutional Security Cabinet.

Augusto Heleno Pereira was investigated by the Federal Police of Brazil, along with other former members of the Bolsonaro government, as a suspect of participating in a coup d'état plot. On 21 November 2024, he was formally indicted, together with other military and civilian suspects. He was formally arrested and sent to jail to have his sentence carried on 25 November 2025 after being found guilty, together with others, of five crimes: attempted coup d'etat, armed criminal organization, violent attempt to abolish the democratic rule of law, aggravated damage to federal property, and deterioration of protected heritage. This was the first time in history that Brazil condemned generals for a coup d'état.

== Military career ==
Heleno graduated as Aspirant of cavalry in 1969, at the Military Academy of Agulhas Negras, placing first in his cavalry class. He was also the first in the cavalry class in the Officials Improvement School (EsAO) and Army Command and Staff School (ECEME), receiving the silver Marshal Hermes medal with three crowns. As Major, Heleno joined the Brazilian mission of instruction in Paraguay. As Colonel, he commanded the Preparatory School for Army Cadets (EsPCEx) in Campinas and was military attaché in the Brazilian Embassy in Paris, also accredited in Brussels. As Official General, Heleno was commander of the 5th Armored Cavalry Brigade and of the Army Physical Capacitation Center, chief of the Army Social Communication Center and of the Chief of Staff of the Army Commander.

From June 2004 to September 2005, he was the first military commander of the United Nations Stabilisation Mission in Haiti (MINUSTAH), made up of 6,250 Blue Helmets from 13 countries, of which 7 were Latin Americans. During his time in Haiti he was known for leading a United Nations armed assault on Cité Soleil that killed dozens of people including Dread Wilme. Similarly to Chilean ambassador Juan Gabriel Valdés, special representative of the Secretary-General of the United Nations and chief of the mission, and of the Latin American governments, General Heleno expressed his disapproval at the strategy adopted by the international community about Haiti. He was succeeded in the MINUSTAH command by General Urano Teixeira da Mata Bacelar, who committed suicide in Port-au-Prince, four months later, in January 2006.

As military commander of the Amazon, General Heleno contested the indigenous politics of the government of president Luiz Inácio Lula da Silva, who characterized the policies as "unfortunate, if not chaotic" during a speech in the Military Club in Rio de Janeiro, at the time of the demarcation of the indigenous land of Raposa/Serra do Sol. He stated that the indigenous "gravitate around our squads because they are completely abandoned".

His last occupation in the active service was as chief of the Department of Science and Technology. On 9 May 2011, in a ceremony in the Army Headquarters in Brasília, Heleno retired and defended the 1964 military regime, after 45 years of military life.

== Life after retirement ==
General Heleno acted as security and military issues consultant of the Grupo Bandeirantes, where he collaborated being a commentator in the broadcasters' schedule.

Heleno was also Communication and Corporative Education director of the Brazilian Olympic Committee (COB).

In 2013, he was convicted of authorizing illegal grants.

On 18 July 2018, there was a rumor that General Heleno would be nominated as candidate for vice presidency of Brazil, along with Deputy Jair Bolsonaro's coalition. However, he denied the candidacy for not being of his party interest, but kept supporting Bolsonaro's candidacy for President of Brazil and was subsequently invited for the Ministry of Defence. However, ten days later it was confirmed that Bolsonaro had chosen him to run the Institutional Security Office of the Presidency of the Republic.

He is the son of Ari de Oliveira Pereira and Edina Ribeiro Pereira, is married to Sônia Pereira and had two children: Renata and Mário Márcio.

On 18 March 2020, Heleno tested positive for COVID-19.

On 11 September 2025, Heleno was convicted by the Brazilian Supreme Court, alongside former president Jair Bolsonaro and other six members of his government, for an attempted coup d’état. All but one of them were found guilty of five crimes: attempted coup d’état, armed criminal organization, violent attempt to abolish the democratic rule of law, aggravated damage to federal property, and deterioration of protected heritage (the exception was Alexandre Ramagem, former chief spy, who was temporally acquitted of the property-related charges connected to the 8 January Brasília attacks because at the time of the events he was already a sworn member of the Chamber of Deputies and held prosecution immunity for these charges). On 25 November, Augusto Heleno was arrested by the Brazilian Federal Police and taken into custody into the Planalto Military Command headquarters in Brasília to serve his 21-year sentence.

== Notes ==
Military offices
Preceded by Francisco Ronald da Silva Nogueira	Commander of EsPCEx; 1994–1996	Succeeded by Mário de Oliveira Seixas
Political offices
Preceded by Sérgio Etchegoyen	Secretary of Institutional Security; 2019–2023	Succeeded by Gonçalves Dias
Diplomatic posts
Office created	Commander of MINUSTAH; 2004–2005	Succeeded by Urano Teixeira da Matta Bacellar
