= Ricardo Cappelli =

Brazilian politician and journalist

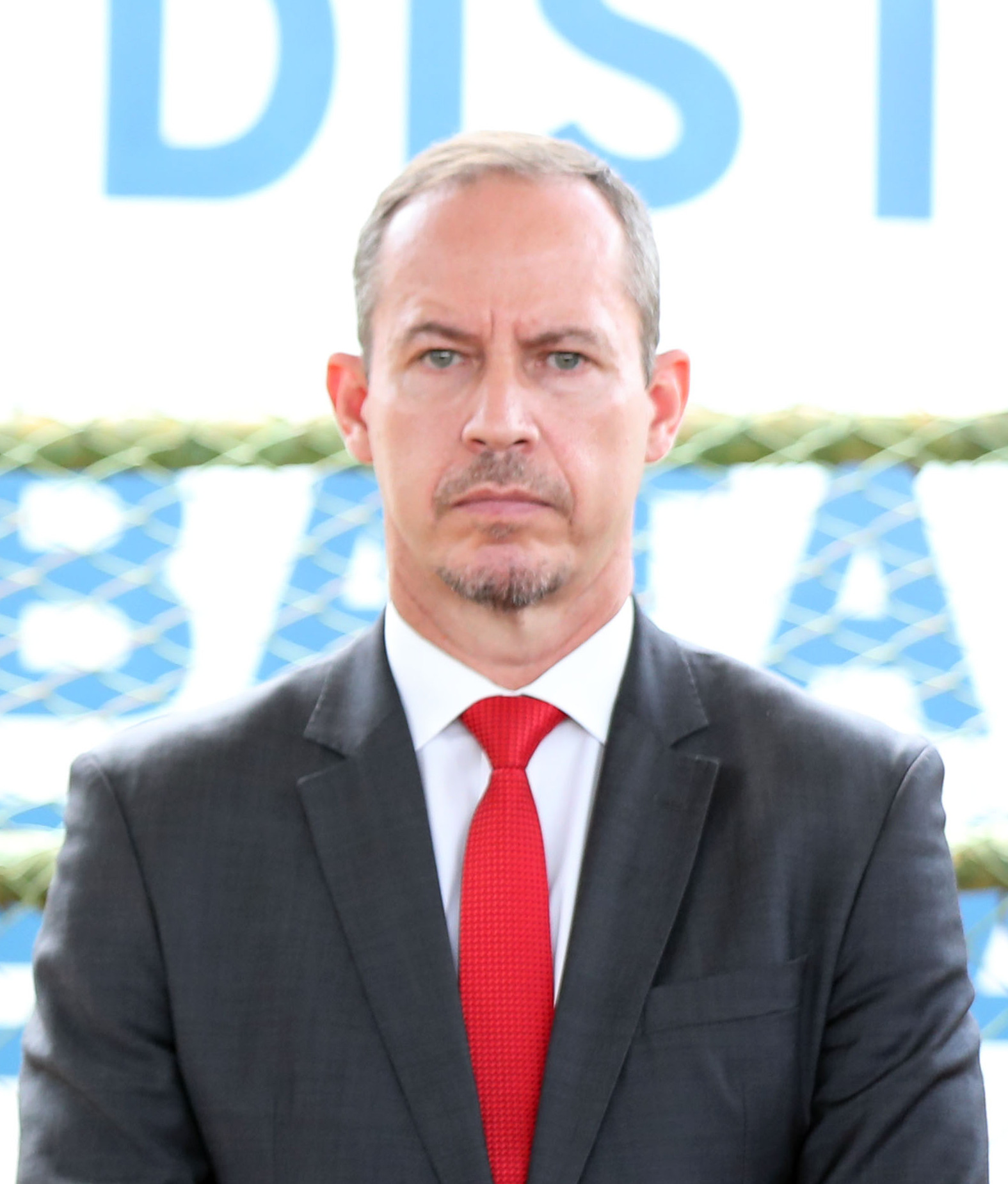
- Cappelli in January 2023

Executive-Secretary of the Ministry of Justice and Public Security
- In office 4 May 2023 – 1 February 2024
- Minister: Flávio Dino
- Preceded by: Diego Galdino (interim)
- In office 1 January 2023 – 19 April 2023
- Preceded by: Antônio Ramirez Lorenzo
- Succeeded by: Diego Galdino

Head of the Institutional Security Bureau (interim)
- In office 19 April 2023 – 3 May 2023
- President: Luiz Inácio Lula da Silva
- Preceded by: Marco Edson Gonçalves Dias
- Succeeded by: Marcos Antonio Amaro dos Santos

Executive-Secretary of the Institutional Security Bureau
- In office 19 April 2023 – 3 May 2023
- President: Luiz Inácio Lula da Silva
- Preceded by: Ricardo José Nigri
- Succeeded by: Ivan de Sousa Corrêa Filho

Federal Interventor in the Federal District
- In office 8 January 2023 – 31 January 2023
- President: Luiz Inácio Lula da Silva
- Governor: Celina Leão (interim)

President of the National Union of Students
- In office 1997–1999
- Preceded by: Orlando Silva
- Succeeded by: Wadson Ribeiro

Personal details
- Born: Ricardo Garcia Cappelli; 11 February 1972 (age 54) Rio de Janeiro, Brazil
- Party: PSB (2021–Now)
- Other political affiliations: PCdoB (2002–2021)
- Education: Estácio de Sá University

Ricardo Garcia Cappelli (born 11 February 1972) is a Brazilian journalist and politician. He was appointed the Executive Secretary to the Ministry of Justice and Public Security on 1 January 2023, and additionally the Federal Intervenor in the Secretariat for Public Security of the Federal District on 8 January 2023.

== Career ==
Cappelli was born in Rio de Janeiro and studied data science at the University of Estácio de Sá.

Cappelli was an adviser to a Rio councillor on youth policy from 2000 to 2002, when he unsuccessfully ran on a Communist ticket for the Legislative Assembly of Rio de Janeiro.

He was National Secretary for sport, education, recreation and social inclusion in the Ministry of Sports from 2003 to 2006, Secretary of development of Nova Iguaçu in 2008, and Secretary of Communication of Maranhão during the term of Flávio Dino as governor; he followed Dino in leaving the communists and joining the Ministry of Justice and Public Security.

On 8 January 2023, he was named Federal Intervenor to the Secretariat for Public Security of the Federal District by the newly inaugurated President Lula da Silva, in the light of the invasion of the Praça dos Três Poderes government buildings by supporters of his predecessor, Jair Bolsonaro. On 19 April 2023, he was named interim head and, at the same time, Executive-Secretary of the Institutional Security Bureau after the resignation of generals Gonçalves Dias and Ricardo Nigri. He was temporarily substituted by Diego Galdino during his absence in the Ministry of Justice. On 3 May, Cappelli returned to his position as Executive Secretary following the appointment of General Amaro as Chief of the Security Cabinet.

Educational offices
Preceded by Orlando Silva	President of the National Union of Students; 1997–1999	Succeeded by Wadson Ribeiro
Political offices
Preceded by Antônio Ramirez Lorenzo	Executive-Secretary of the Ministry of Justice and Public Security; 2023–2024	Succeeded by Manoel de Almeida Neto
Preceded by Marco Edson Gonçalves Dias	Head of the Institutional Security Bureau; Interim; 2023	Succeeded by Marcos Antonio Amaro dos Santos
