= Maria Rita Serrano =

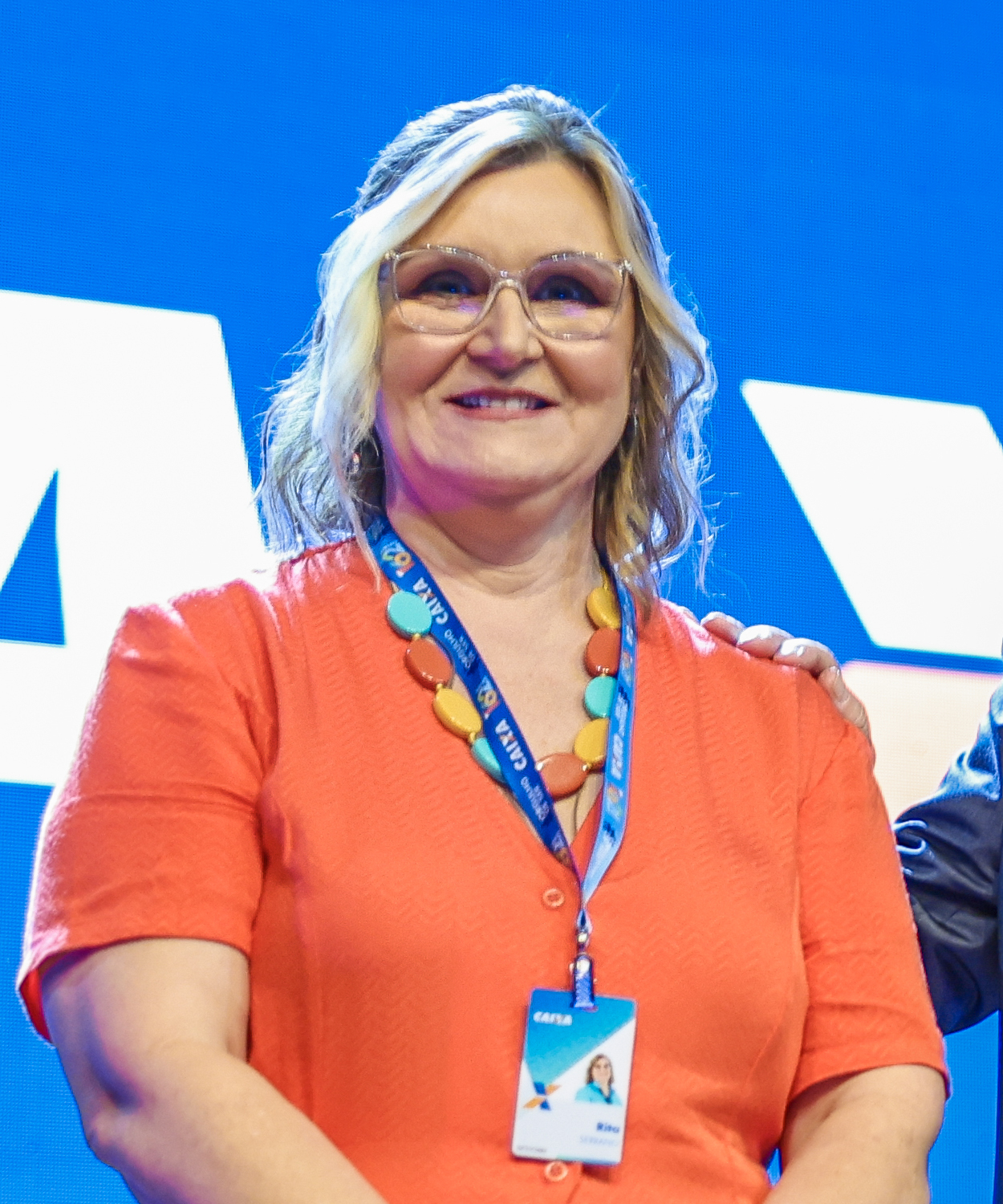

Chairwoman of Caixa Econômica Federal
- In office 9 January 2023 – 25 October 2023
- President: Luiz Inácio Lula da Silva
- Preceded by: Daniella Marques
- Succeeded by: Carlos Fernandes

Personal details
- Born: 23 June 1968 (age 58) Santo André, São Paulo, Brazil
- Education: Santo André Foundation University Center (BSS); University of Greater ABC (BA); Municipal University of São Caetano do Sul (MBA)
- Occupation: Administrator, trade unionist

Maria Rita Serrano (born 23 June 1968) is a Brazilian administrator, employee of Caixa Econômica Federal since 1989 and chairwoman of the bank from 9 January to 28 October 2023 during the presidency of Luiz Inácio Lula da Silva, being the fourth woman to head the institution.

She was also president of the Bank Employees Trade Union of ABC Region for two terms from 2006 to 2012 and his nomination was supported by the union, as she was their representative in the bank's administrative council. Serrano was elected councillor in 2017 after the end of her term as substitute, which began in 2013, when the first election for the position was held.

She is also a writer, with some books published. One of them talks about Caixa Econômica Federal, "Caixa, Banco dos Brasileiros", critically analyzing the history of the bank. Serrano wrote and published the book "Rompendo Barreiras", which she tells her own story, with participation in militancy and social and trade union movements, besides reflecting about the obstacles imposed on women to prevent them to reach power.

== Academic education ==
Rita Serrano is Bachelor of Social Studies at the Santo André Foundation University Center, Bachelor of History at the University of Greater ABC and Master of Administration at the Municipal University of São Caetano do Sul.

Government offices
Preceded by Daniella Marques	Chairwoman of Caixa Econômica Federal; 2023	Succeeded by Carlos Fernandes
