= José Elito Carvalho Siqueira =

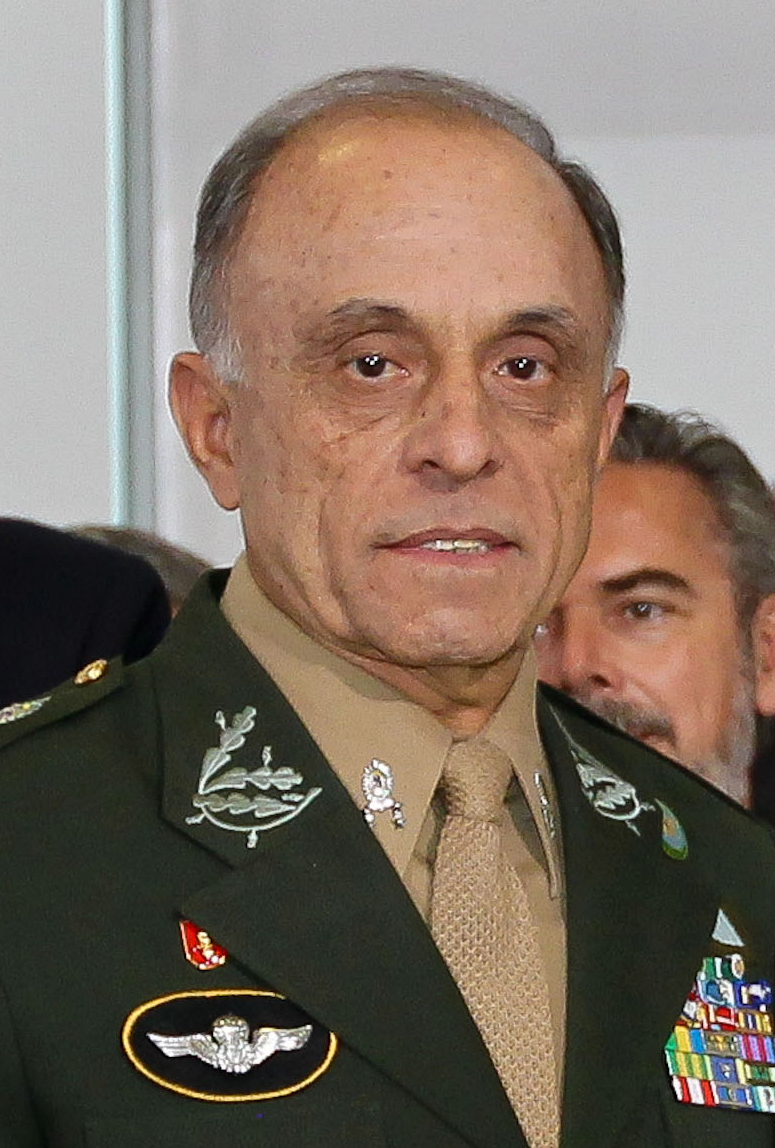

Secretary of Institutional Security
- In office 1 January 2011 – 2 October 2015
- President: Dilma Rousseff
- Preceded by: Jorge Armando Felix
- Succeeded by: Sérgio Etchegoyen (2016)

Commander of the Southern Military Command
- In office 15 August 2007 – 28 November 2008
- Preceded by: Carlos Alberto Pinto Silva
- Succeeded by: José Carlos de Nardi

Commander of MINUSTAH
- In office January 2006 – January 2007
- Head: Juan Gabriel Valdés; Edmond Mulet
- Preceded by: Eduardo Aldunate Hermann
- Succeeded by: Carlos Alberto dos Santos Cruz

Personal details
- Born: José Elito Carvalho Siqueira; 26 November 1946 (age 79) Aracaju, SE, Brazil
- Education: Agulhas Negras Military Academy (AMAN)

Military service
- Allegiance: (Brazil)
- Branch/service: Brazilian Army
- Years of service: 1966–2011
- Rank: Army General
- Commands: Institutional Security Cabinet; MINUSTAH; Southern Military Command
- Awards: United Nations Medal (MINUSTAH - Haiti) (United Nations)

Army General José Elito Carvalho Siqueira is a Brazilian military and former Chief-Minister of the Institutional Security Cabinet of the Presidency of the Republic.

== Military career ==
Siqueira graduated as infantry Aspirant in 1969 in the Agulhas Negras Military Academy (AMAN) and has exercised numerous functions, including as commanding military officer of the United Nations Stabilisation Mission in Haiti(MINUSTAH) and as Southern Military Commander of the Brazilian Army between 15 August 2007 and 28 November 2008.

== Political career ==
Siqueira was promoted to the current rank on 31 July 2007 and chosen Minister of State Chief of the Institutional Security Cabinet of the Presidency of the Republic by President-elect Dilma Rousseff on 21 December 2010.

After taking office as new Chief-Minister of the Institutional Security Cabinet, Elito - as he is called in the Army - stood against the creation of the National Truth Commission to investigate human rights violations during the military regime, claiming that no one should be "looking things from the past". and that "today if our children and grandchildren go to study in a school, the 31 March will be there as a historical fact. We should see the 31 March as a historical data for the nation, with pros and cons, but as a historical data. The same way the disappeared ones".

In another interview, Siqueira said that the existence of political disappeared people is not a shame for the country. Dilma Rousseff, who was tortured during the regime, reprimanded the general, who apologized alleging that he was misunderstood in his press statements.

On 2 December 2015, in Dilma's ministry reform, Siqueira was fired and the Security Cabinet was merged with the Secretariat of Government, created in that day and assumed by Ricardo Berzoini.

== Awards ==
- United Nations Medal (MINUSTAH - Haiti) (United Nations)

Military offices
Preceded by Jorge Armando Felix	Secretary of Institutional Security; 2011–2015	Vacant Title next held by Sérgio Etchegoyen
Preceded by Carlos Alberto Pinto Silva	Commander of Southern Military Command; 2007–2008	Succeeded by José Carlos de Nardi
Diplomatic posts
Preceded by Eduardo Aldunate Hermann	Commander of MINUSTAH; 2006–2007	Succeeded by Carlos Alberto dos Santos Cruz
