= Sérgio Etchegoyen =

Brazilian general

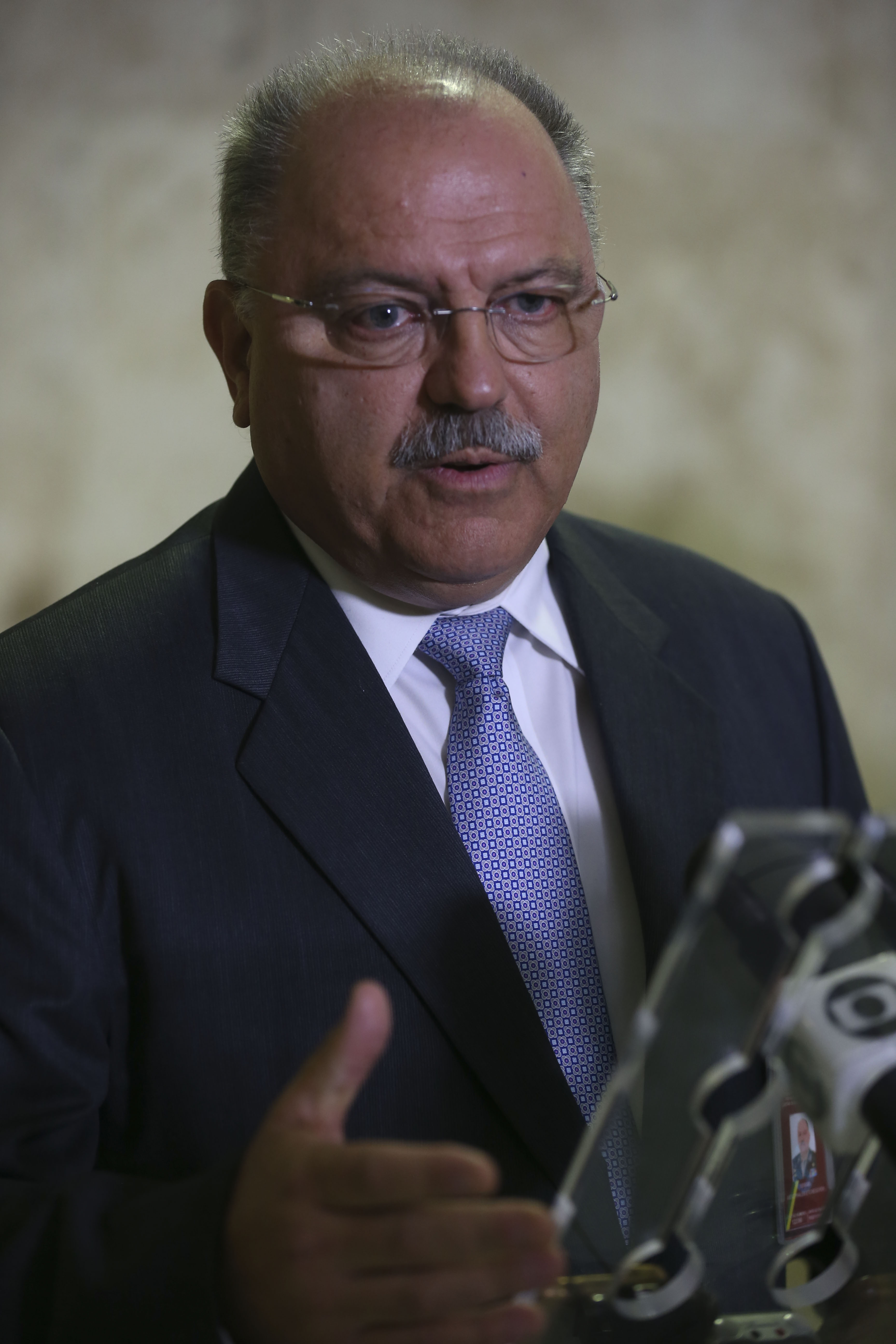
- General Sérgio Westphalen Etchegoyen

Secretary of Institutional Security
- In office 12 May 2016 – 1 January 2019
- President: Michel Temer
- Preceded by: José Elito Carvalho Siqueira
- Succeeded by: Augusto Heleno

Chief of Staff of the Brazilian Army
- In office March 2015 – May 2016
- Army Commander: Eduardo Villas Bôas
- Preceded by: Adhemar Machado Filho
- Succeeded by: Francisco Modesto

Commander of the Brazilian Army Command and General Staff School
- In office 13 December 2006 – 6 April 2009
- Army Commander: Francisco Roberto de Albuquerque (2006–2007); Enzo Peri (2007–2009)
- Preceded by: Luiz Eduardo Rocha Paiva
- Succeeded by: João Camilo Pires de Campos

Personal details
- Born: Sérgio Westphalen Etchegoyen; 1 February 1952 (age 74) Cruz Alta, RS, Brazil
- Occupation: Army general

Military service
- Allegiance: Brazil
- Branch/service: Brazilian Army
- Years of service: 1971–present
- Rank: Army General
- Commands: 4th Mechanized Cavalry Brigade

Sérgio Westphalen Etchegoyen (born 1 February 1952, in Cruz Alta) is a Brazilian general and former Secretary of Institutional Security, during the presidency of Michel Temer.

== See also ==
- Carlos Alberto Brilhante Ustra
- Paulo Malhães
- National Truth Commission

Military offices
| Preceded by José Elito Carvalho Siqueira | Secretary of Institutional Security; 2016–2019 | Succeeded by Augusto Heleno |
| Preceded by Adhemar Machado Filho | Chief of Staff of the Brazilian Army; 2015–2016 | Succeeded by Francisco Modesto |
| Preceded by Luiz Eduardo Rocha Paiva | Commander of the Brazilian Army Command and General Staff School; 2006–2009 | Succeeded by João Camilo Pires de Campos |
