= Institutional Security Bureau =

Brazilian federal cabinet office

- Portuguese: Gabinete de Segurança Institucional

Bureau overview
- Formed: 1 November 1930; 95 years ago
- Type: Ministry
- Jurisdiction: Federal government of Brazil
- Headquarters: Planalto Palace, Praça dos Três Poderes; Brasília, Federal District
- Annual budget: $2.29 b BRL (2023)
- Bureau executives: Gen Marcos Antonio Amaro dos Santos, Chief-Minister; Div Gen Ivan Corrêa Filho, Executive-Secretary; Brig Gen Ricardo do Amaral Peixoto, Secretary of Presidential Security; C Adm Francisco Barros Conde, Secretary of Monitoring and Management of Strategic Affairs; Lt Brig Marcos Vilela Valença, Secretary of Coordination and Aerospace Affairs; André Molina, Secretary of Cyber and Information Security
- Parent Bureau: Presidency of the Republic
- Website: www.gov.br/gsi/

The Institutional Security Bureau (Portuguese: Gabinete de Segurança Institucional da Presidência da República, GSI; English: Institutional Security Bureau of the Presidency of the Republic, ISB) is an executive cabinet office of the federal government of Brazil responsible for providing direct assistance at a moment's notice to the President on matters of national security and defense policy. It is currently headed by retired general Marcos Antonio Amaro dos Santos.

== Responsibilities ==
- Assist the President directly in the performance of their duties;
- Prevent the occurrence of serious and imminent threats to institutional stability;
- Organize crisis management response to a threat to national and institutional stability;
- Provide personal advice on military and security issues;
- Coordinate federal intelligence activities and information security;
- Ensure the personal security of the President, the Vice-President of the Republic and their families and, where determined by the President of the Republic, the holders of the essential organs of the Presidency and other authorities and personalities, having received law enforcement powers for this purpose;
- Serve as the central government organ which oversees and organizes the Brazilian Nuclear Program Protection System;
- Provide planning and coordination to events which the President is expected to attend both and home and, with the assistance of the Ministry of Foreign Affairs, also abroad;
- Provide assistance to activities pertaining to the Brazilian Aerospace Sector;
- Provide assistance to activities pertaining to terrorism and the actions necessary to prevent and neutralize it, providing subsidies when necessary.

== History ==
Created by Provisional Measure (MP) No. 1911-10 of 24 September 1999 by President Fernando Henrique Cardoso.

The existence of a body responsible for institutional security is not new in Brazilian history, having been the responsibility of multiple government agencies prior to the creation of the Institutional Security Bureau:

- 1930 – 1934: General Staff of the Provisional Government
- 1934 – 1938: General Staff of the Government
- 1938 – 1992: Military Office
- 1992 – 1999: Ministry of Defence
- 1999 – 2015 (temporarily deactivated): Institutional Security Bureau
- 2016 (re-activated by President Michel Temer): Institutional Security Bureau

== List of ministers ==
No.	Portrait	Minister	Took office	Left office	Time in office	President
1	Francisco Ramos de Andrade Neves	Francisco Ramos de Andrade Neves (1874–1951)	1 November 1930	1 January 1931	61 days	Getúlio Vargas (Ind)
2	Raul Tavares	Raul Tavares (1876–1953)	1 January 1931	1 May 1931	120 days	Getúlio Vargas (Ind)
3	João Ferreira Johnson	João Ferreira Johnson	1 May 1931	1 November 1932	1 year, 184 days	Getúlio Vargas (Ind)
4	Pantaleão da Silva Pessoa	Pantaleão da Silva Pessoa (1885–1980)	1 November 1932	1 May 1935	2 years, 181 days	Getúlio Vargas (Ind)
5	Newton de Andrade Cavalcanti	Newton de Andrade Cavalcanti (1885–1965)	1 May 1935	20 July 1935	80 days	Getúlio Vargas (Ind)
6	Francisco José Pinto	Francisco José Pinto (1883–1942)	20 July 1935	8 May 1942	6 years, 292 days	Getúlio Vargas (Ind)
7	Firmo Freire do Nascimento	Firmo Freire do Nascimento (1881–1967)	18 September 1942	18 October 1945	3 years, 30 days	Getúlio Vargas (Ind)
8	Francisco Gil Castelo Branco	Francisco Gil Castelo Branco (1886–1956)	18 October 1945	31 January 1946	105 days	José Linhares (Ind)
9	Álcio Souto	Álcio Souto (1896–1948)	31 January 1946	13 September 1948	2 years, 226 days	Eurico Gaspar Dutra (PSD)
10	João Valdetaro de Amorim e Mello	João Valdetaro de Amorim e Mello (1896–1989)	13 September 1948	4 April 1950	1 year, 203 days	Eurico Gaspar Dutra (PSD)
11	Newton de Andrade Cavalcanti	Newton de Andrade Cavalcanti (1885–1965)	4 April 1950	31 January 1951	302 days	Eurico Gaspar Dutra (PSD)
12	Ciro do Espírito Santo Cardoso	Ciro do Espírito Santo Cardoso (1898–1979)	31 January 1951	31 March 1952	1 year, 60 days	Getúlio Vargas (PTB)
13	Aguinaldo Caiado de Castro	Aguinaldo Caiado de Castro (1899–1963)	10 April 1952	24 August 1954	2 years, 136 days	Getúlio Vargas (PTB)
14	Juarez Távora	Juarez Távora (1898–1975)	24 August 1954	14 April 1955	233 days	Café Filho (PSP)
15	José Bina Machado	José Bina Machado (1896–1964)	14 April 1955	15 October 1955	184 days	Café Filho (PSP)
16	Floriano de Lima Brayner	Floriano de Lima Brayner (1897–1983)	15 October 1955	31 January 1956	108 days	Nereu Ramos (PSD)
17	Nélson de Melo	Nélson de Melo (1899–1989)	31 January 1956	5 August 1960	4 years, 187 days	Juscelino Kubitschek (PSD)
18	Waldemar Pio dos Santos	Waldemar Pio dos Santos	5 August 1960	31 January 1961	179 days	Juscelino Kubitschek (PSD)
19	Pedro Geraldo de Almeida	Pedro Geraldo de Almeida (1901–1977)	31 January 1961	28 May 1961	117 days	Jânio Quadros (PTN)
20	Ernesto Geisel	Ernesto Geisel (1907–1996)	25 August 1961	8 September 1961	14 days	Ranieri Mazzilli (PSD)
21	Amaury Kruel	Amaury Kruel (1901–1996)	8 September 1961	19 September 1961	11 days	João Goulart (PTB)
22	Aurélio de Lira Tavares	Aurélio de Lira Tavares (1905–1998)	19 September 1961	12 July 1962	296 days	João Goulart (PTB)
23	Amaury Kruel	Amaury Kruel (1901–1996)	12 July 1962	18 September 1962	68 days	João Goulart (PTB)
24	Albino Silva	Albino Silva (1909–1976)	18 September 1962	12 June 1963	267 days	João Goulart (PTB)
25	Aurélio de Lira Tavares	Aurélio de Lira Tavares (1905–1998)	12 June 1963	18 October 1963	128 days	João Goulart (PTB)
26	Argemiro de Assis Brasil	Argemiro de Assis Brasil (1907–1982)	18 October 1963	31 March 1964	165 days	João Goulart (PTB)
27	André Fernandes de Sousa	André Fernandes de Sousa (1903–1975)	2 April 1964	15 April 1964	13 days	Ranieri Mazzilli (PSD)
28	Ernesto Geisel	Ernesto Geisel (1907–1996)	15 April 1964	15 March 1967	2 years, 334 days	Castelo Branco (ARENA)
29	Jaime Portela de Melo	Jaime Portela de Melo (1911–1984)	15 March 1967	30 October 1969	2 years, 229 days	Costa e Silva (ARENA); Military Junta of 1969 (Military junta)
30	João Figueiredo	João Figueiredo (1918–1999)	30 October 1969	15 March 1974	4 years, 136 days	Emílio Garrastazu Médici (ARENA)
31	Hugo de Abreu	Hugo de Abreu (1916–1979)	15 March 1974	4 January 1978	3 years, 295 days	Ernesto Geisel (ARENA)
32	Gustavo Moraes Rego Reis	Gustavo Moraes Rego Reis (1920–1997)	6 January 1978	15 March 1979	1 year, 68 days	Ernesto Geisel (ARENA)
33	Danilo Venturini	Danilo Venturini (1922–2015)	15 March 1979	24 August 1982	3 years, 162 days	João Figueiredo (ARENA)
34	Rubem Carlos Ludwig	Rubem Carlos Ludwig (1926–1989)	24 August 1982	15 March 1985	2 years, 203 days	João Figueiredo (PDS)
35	Rubem Bayma Denys	Rubem Bayma Denys (born 1929)	15 March 1985	15 March 1990	5 years, 0 days	José Sarney (MDB)
36	Agenor de Carvalho	Agenor de Carvalho (born 1933)	15 March 1990	2 October 1992	2 years, 201 days	Fernando Collor (PRN)
37	Fernando Cardoso	Fernando Cardoso (1937–2021)	5 October 1992	1 January 1995	2 years, 88 days	Itamar Franco (MDB)
38	Alberto Mendes Cardoso	Alberto Mendes Cardoso (born 1940)	1 January 1995	24 September 1999	8 years, 0 days	Fernando Henrique Cardoso (PSDB)
39	Jorge Armando Felix	Jorge Armando Felix (born 1939)	1 January 2003	1 January 2011	8 years, 0 days	Luiz Inácio Lula da Silva (PT)
40	José Elito Carvalho Siqueira	José Elito Carvalho Siqueira (born 1946)	1 January 2011	2 October 2015	4 years, 274 days	Dilma Rousseff (PT)
41	Marcos Antonio Amaro dos Santos	Marcos Antonio Amaro dos Santos (born 1957)	2 October 2015	12 May 2016	223 days	Dilma Rousseff (PT)
42	Sérgio Etchegoyen	Sérgio Etchegoyen (born 1952)	12 May 2016	1 January 2019	2 years, 234 days	Michel Temer (MDB)
43	Augusto Heleno	Augusto Heleno (born 1947)	1 January 2019	1 January 2023	4 years, 0 days	Jair Bolsonaro (PL)
44	Marco Edson Gonçalves Dias	Marco Edson Gonçalves Dias (born 1950)	1 January 2023	19 April 2023	108 days	Luiz Inácio Lula da Silva (PT)
–	Ricardo Cappelli	Ricardo Cappelli (born 1972); Acting	19 April 2023	4 May 2023	15 days	Luiz Inácio Lula da Silva (PT)
45	Marcos Antonio Amaro dos Santos	Marcos Antonio Amaro dos Santos (born 1957)	4 May 2023	Incumbent	3 years, 7 days	Luiz Inácio Lula da Silva (PT)
