= Order of Defence Merit =

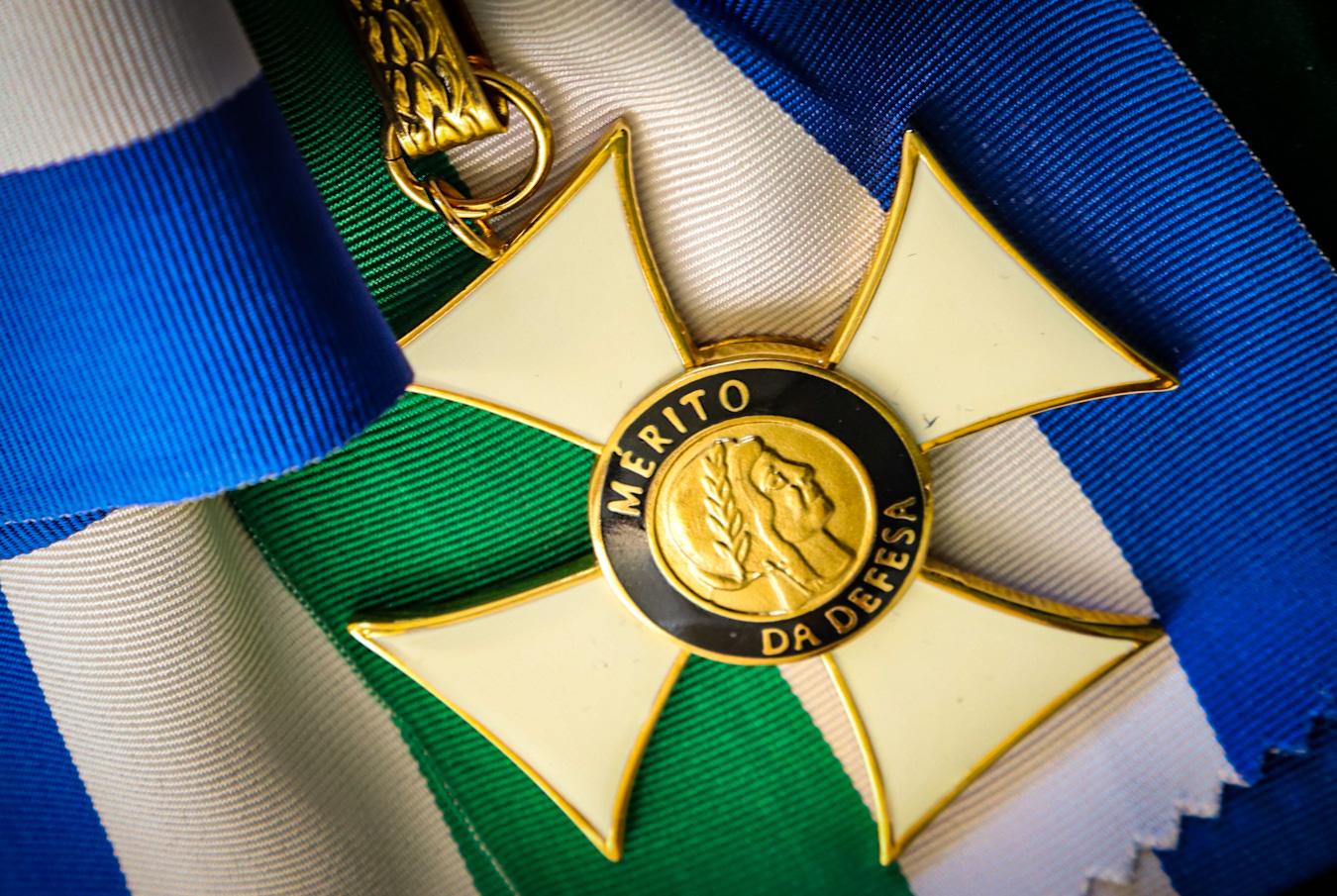
- Cross of the Order of Defence Merit
- Type: State Order
- Awarded for: Relevant service to Brazilian Military
- Country: Brazil
- Presented by: Brazilian Armed Forces
- Eligibility: Members of the Brazilian Armed Forces or civilians and foreign armed forces and civilians
- Established: 10 June 2002
- Ribbon bar of the order

The Order of Defence Merit is an award of the Brazilian Military, established on 10 June 2002 by decree No. 4263. The order is presented in five grades and recognizes distinguished service and exceptional contributions to Brazil by members of the Brazilian Military and the armies of friendly nations as well as civilians, and, less common, to organizations and institutions.

== Grades ==
The five grades are Grand Cross, Grand Officer, Commander, Officer, and Knight.

Ribbons
Grand Cross; Grã-Cruz	Grand Officer; Grande-Oficial	Commander; Comendador	Officer; Oficial	Knight; Cavaleiro

== Notable recipients ==
- Édouard Guillaud, France (Officer)
- Elon Musk, American Inventor (2022, Commander)
