= General (Brazil) =

The military rank of general in Brazil is held by officers that can use two, three or four stars. They are named in Brazilian Army as General de Brigada (two stars), General de Divisão (three stars) and General de Exército (four stars).

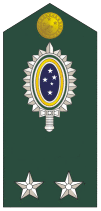
General de Brigada

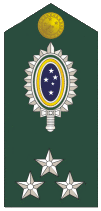
General de Divisão

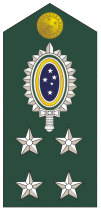
General de Exército

General officers in Brazilian Navy are called as almirante and in Brazilian Air Force as brigadeiro.
