= List of Oscar Niemeyer works =

List of buildings and structures by Brazilian architect Oscar Niemeyer. From the approximately 600 projects designed by Niemeyer, only the most notable are listed below.

== Early works (1930s) ==
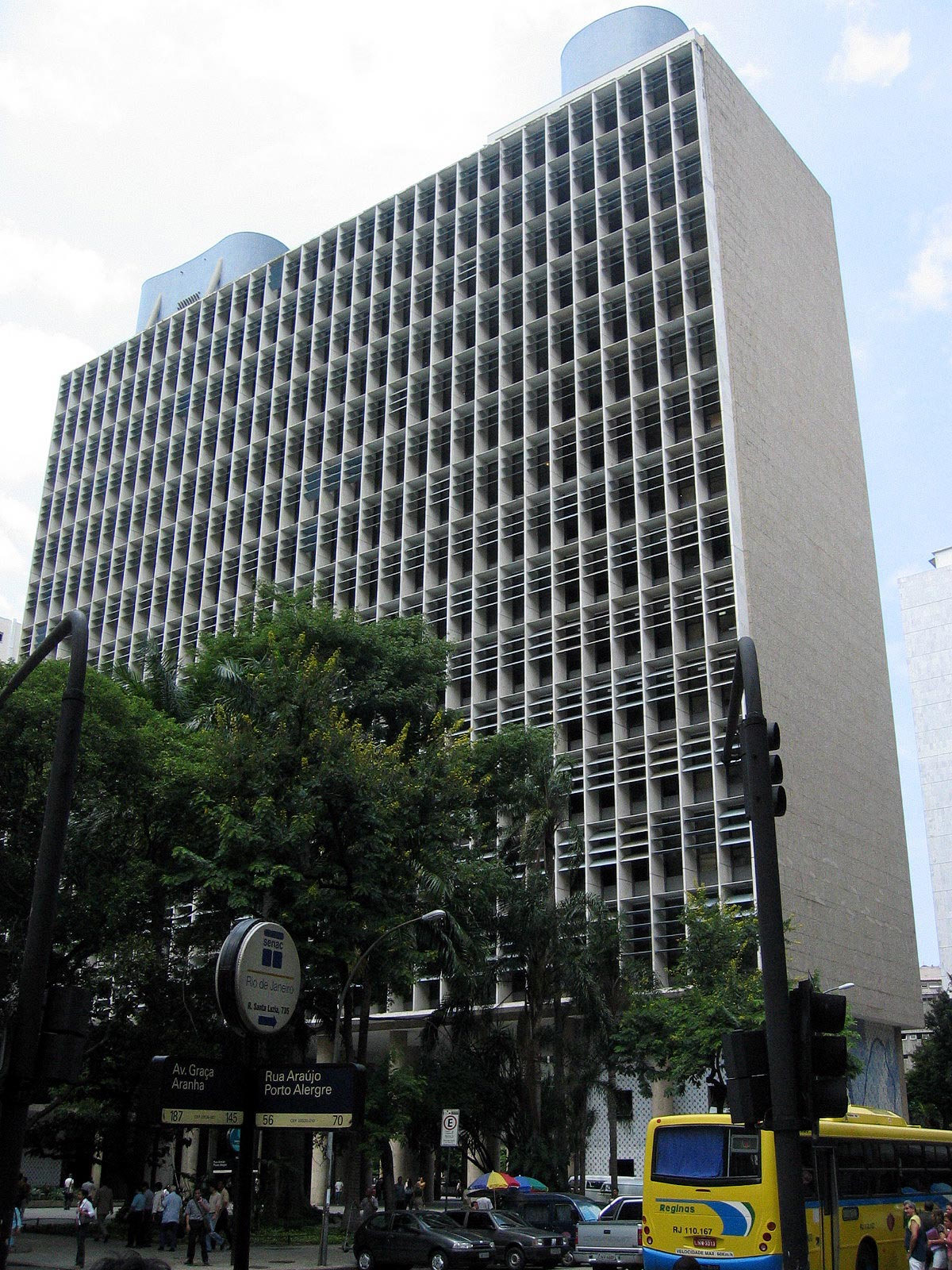
Gustavo Capanema Palace, Rio de Janeiro, 1936

- 1936 – Gustavo Capanema Palace, Ministry of Education and Health, Rio de Janeiro – contributed to the Le Corbusier project.
- 1937 – Associação Beneficente Obra do Berço (Association of Charitable Work) – created a vertical brise soleil.
- 1938 – Grande Hotel of Ouro Preto
- 1939 – Brazil's pavilion at the 1939 New York World's Fair – contributed to the Lucio Costa project.

== 1940s through early 1960s ==
- 1940 – Church of Saint Francis of Assisi and other buildings at Pampulha in Belo Horizonte, southeastern Brazil.
- 1946 – Headquarters of Banco Boavista in Candelaria, Rio de Janeiro.
- 1946 – Colegio Cataguases (Odessa College).
- 1947 – United Nations Headquarters in New York City.
- 1947 – Centro Técnico Aeroespacial in São José dos Campos, SP
- 1951 – Ibirapuera Park (with landscape architect Roberto Burle Marx).
- 1951 – JK Building (Juscelino Kubitschek).
- 1951 – Edifício Copan (Copan Building) 38-story residential building in São Paulo, Brazil.
- 1952 – Casa das Canoas – Niemeyer’s personal home in Canoas, Rio de Janeiro.
- 1954 – Residência Cavanelas.
- 1954 – Museum of Modern Art in Caracas (Museo de Arte Moderno de Caracas) (unbuilt)
- 1954 – Interbau buildings project in the Hansaviertel district, part of the reconstruction of Berlin.
- 1957 Brasilia Palace Hotel, BRASILIA, BRAZIL
- 1954 – Montreal Building (Edifício Montreal) in São Paulo.
- 1955 – Califórnia Building (Edifício Califórnia) in downtown São Paulo (with Carlos Lemos).
- 1955 – Edifício Triângulo (Triangle Building), São Paulo.
- 1956 – Eiffel Building (Edifício Eiffel) located in Praça da República (São Paulo), São Paulo.
- 1956 – Residência Provisória do Presidente da República (Provisional Residence of the President).
- 1957 – Itatiaia Building (Edifício Itatiaia), in downtown Campinas, State of São Paulo
- 1958 – Hospital da Lagoa (Lagoa Hospital) built in Lagoa, Rio de Janeiro.
- 1960 – Niemeyer Building, a residential building in Belo Horizonte.
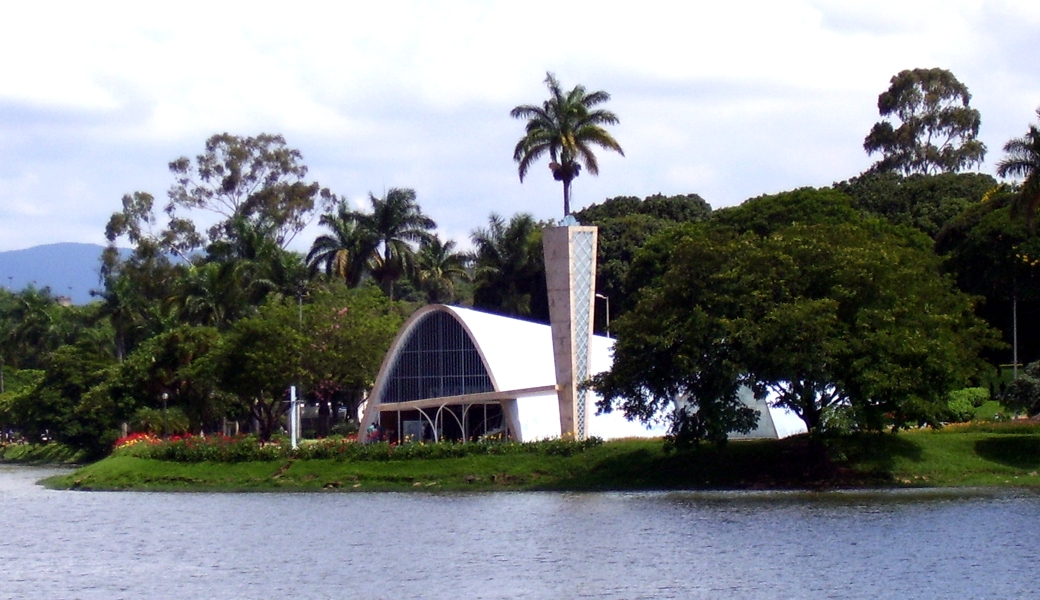
Church of Saint Francis of Assisi, 1940

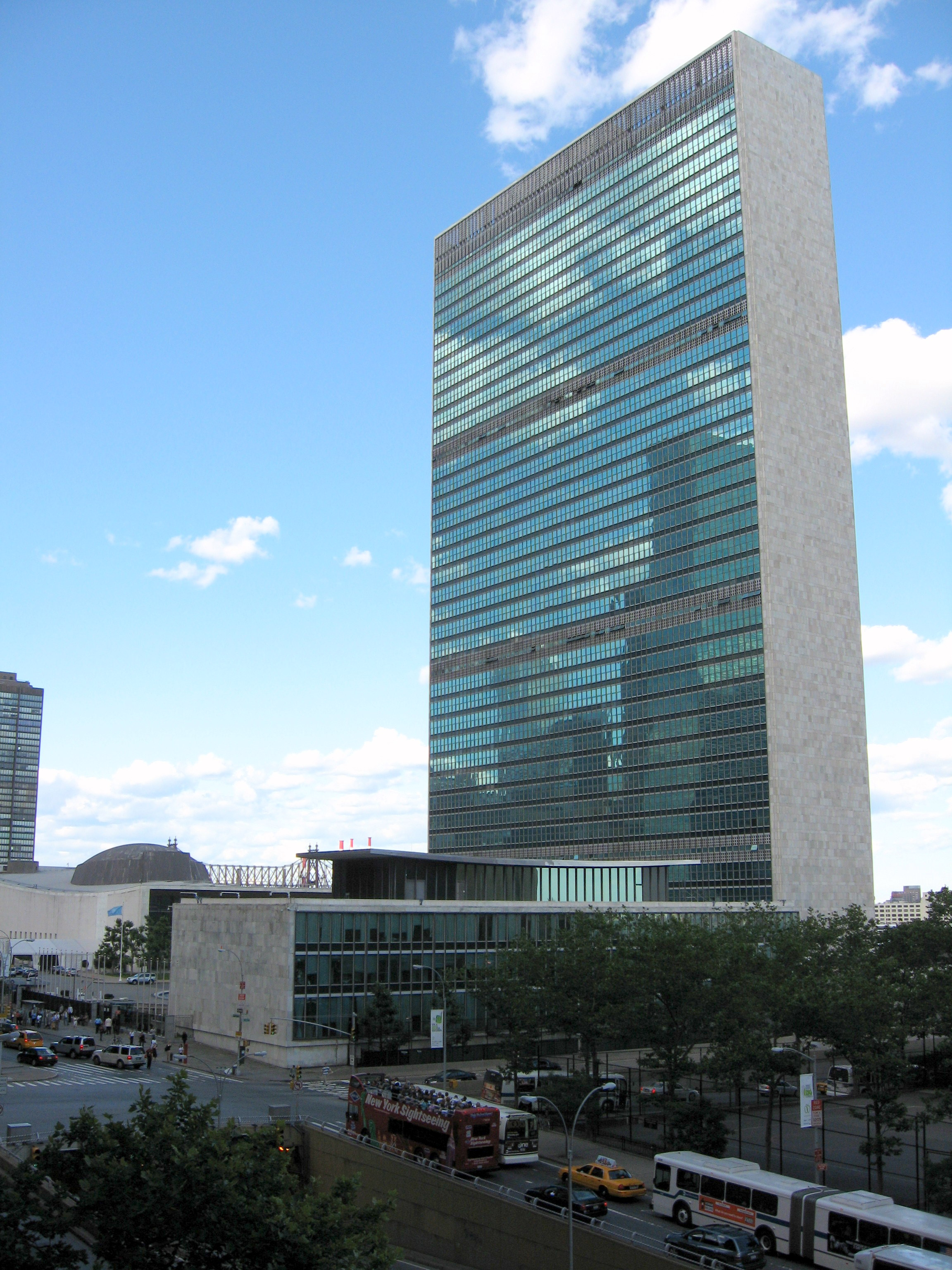
View of the United Nations headquarters looking toward the library, Secretariat, and General Assembly buildings, 1947

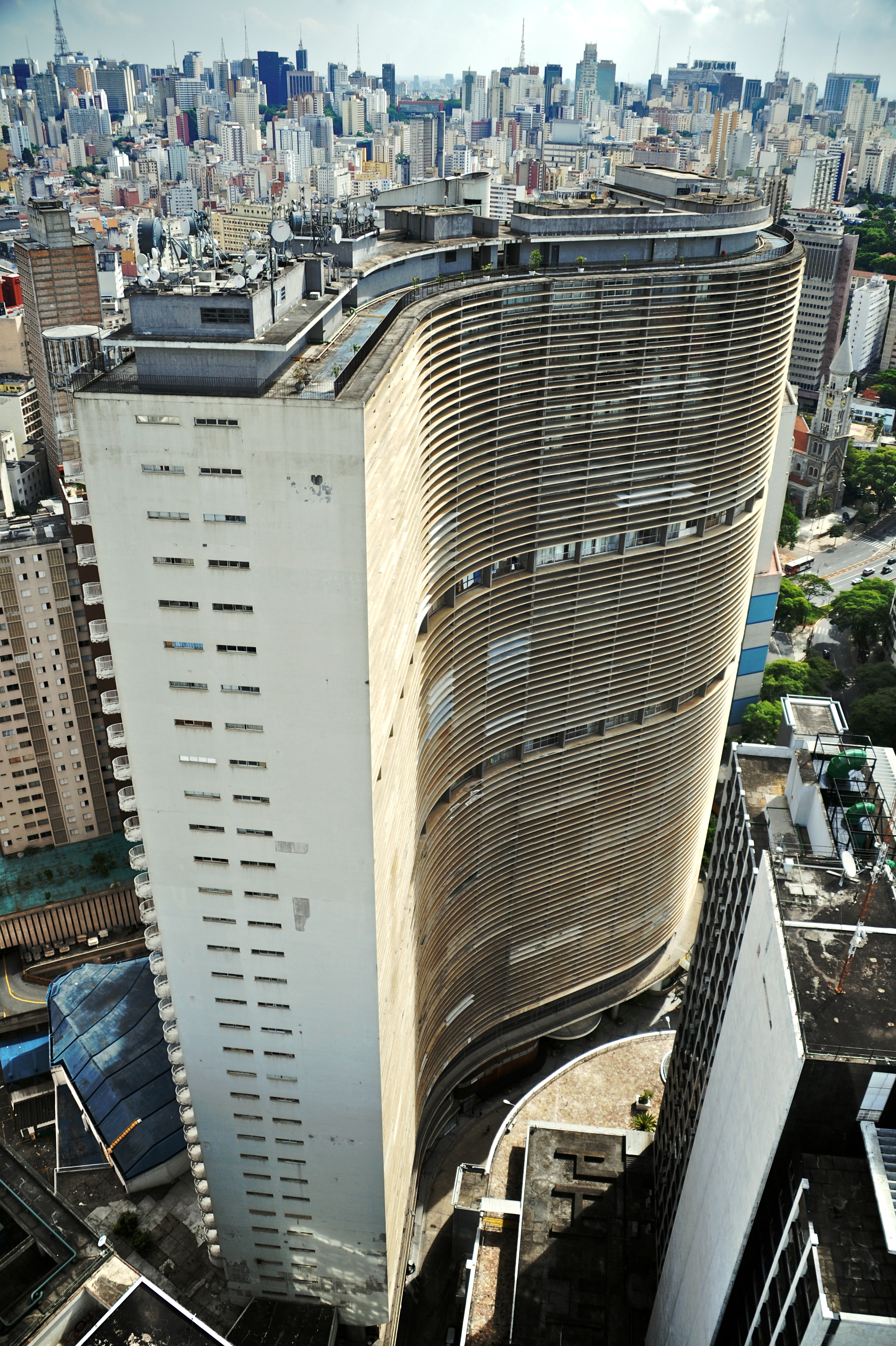
Edifício Copan, São Paulo, 1951

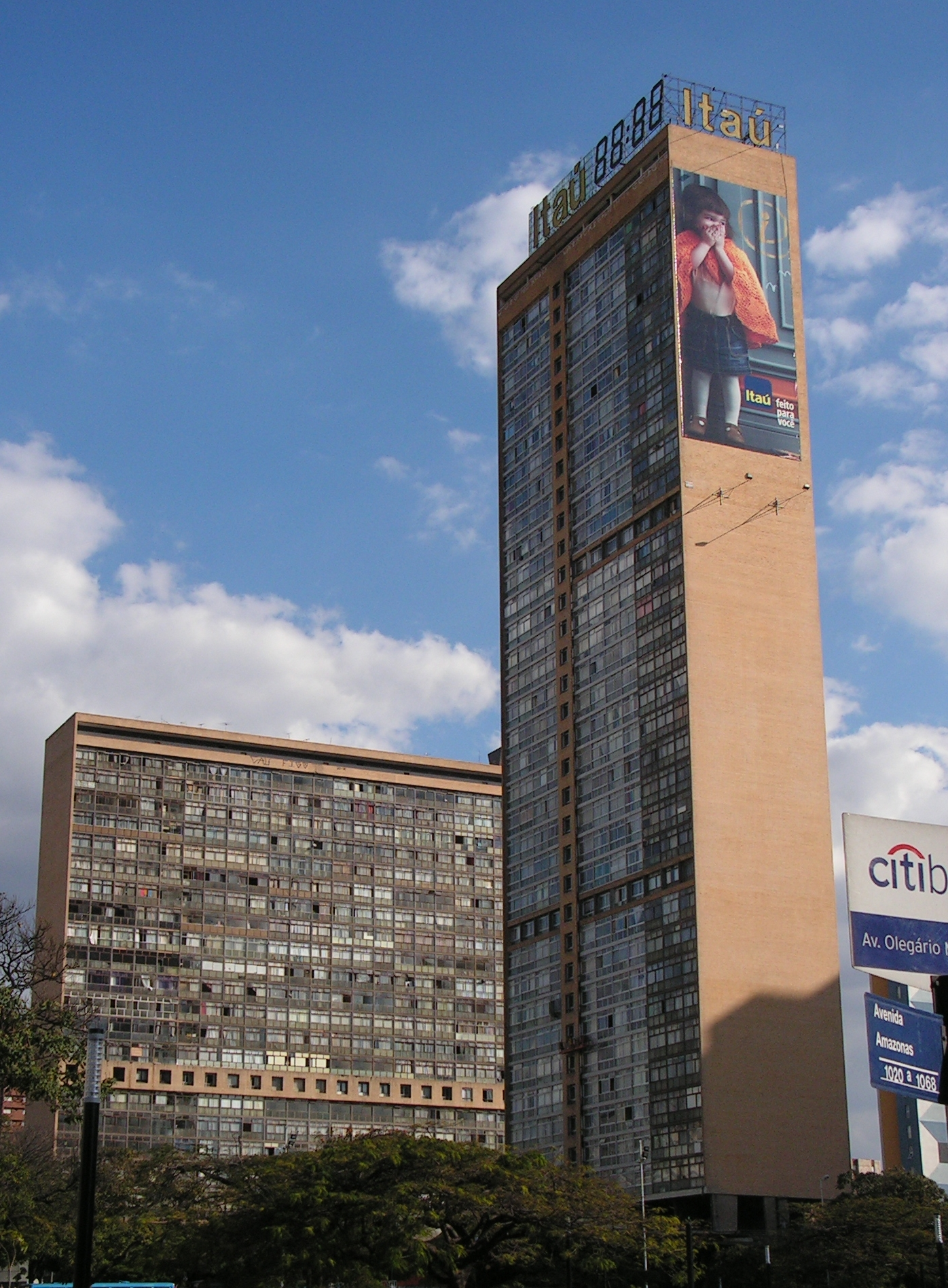
JK Building, Belo Horizonte, 1951

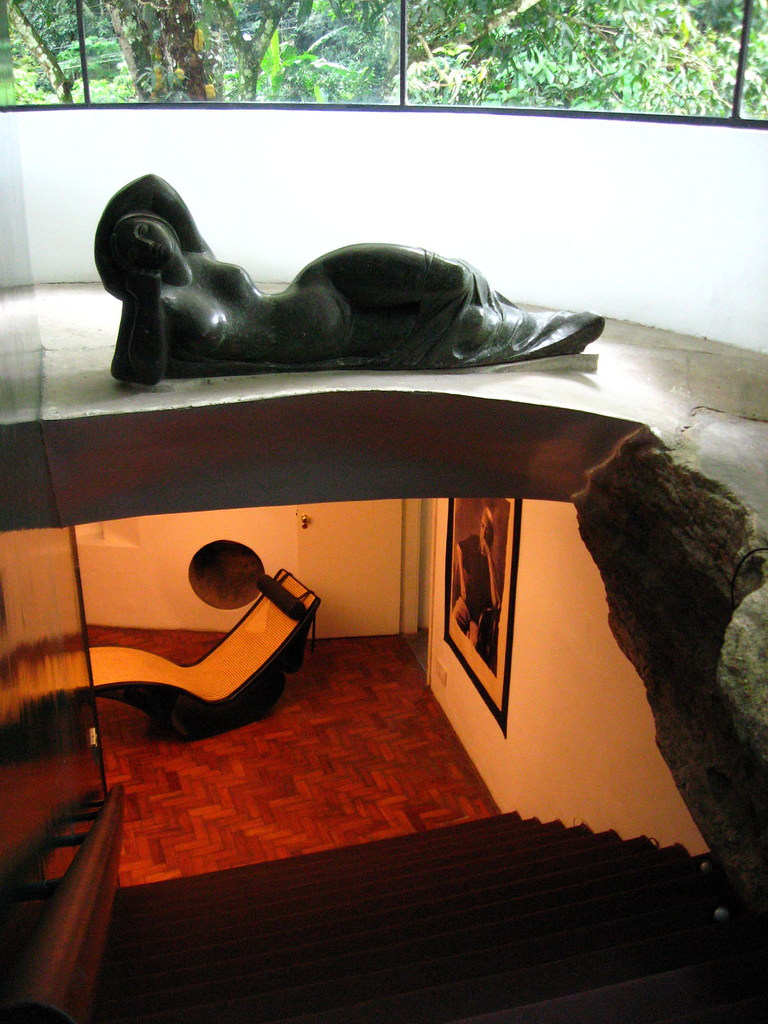
Casa das Canoas, Rio de Janeiro, 1952

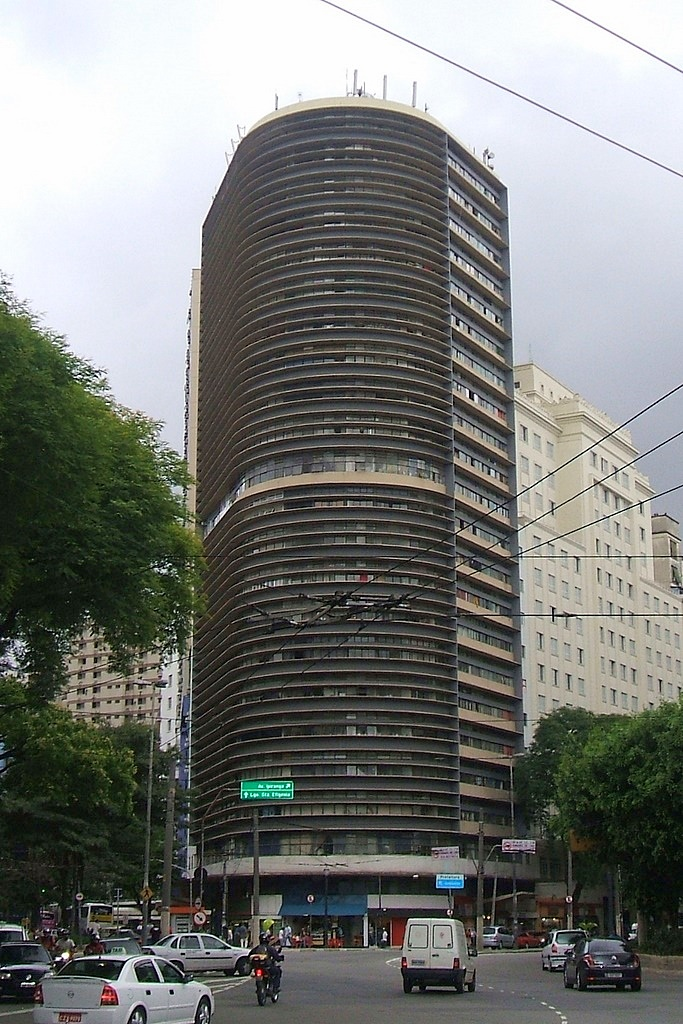
Edifício Montreal, São Paulo, 1954

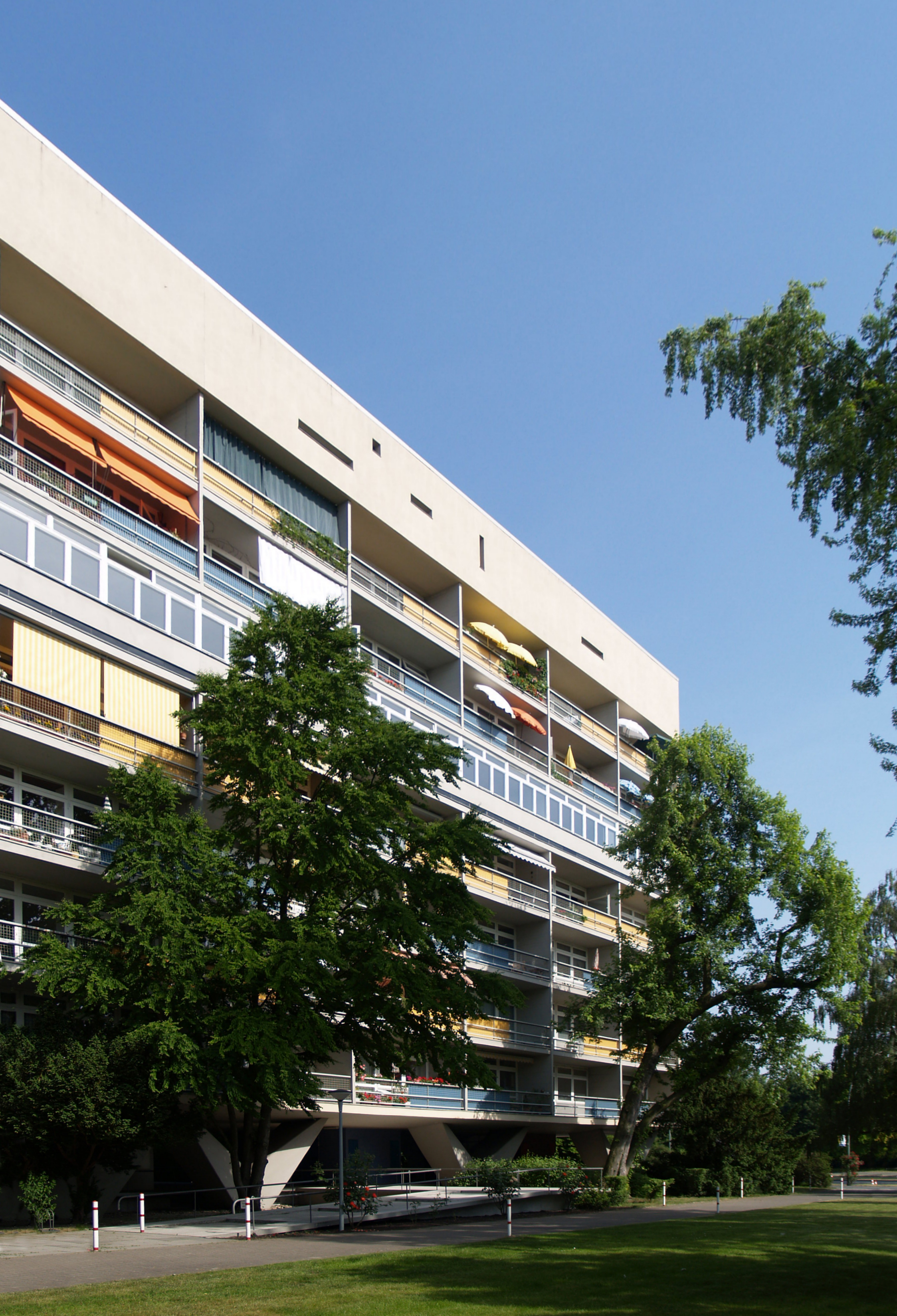
Interbau apartments building in the Hansaviertel, Berlin, 1954

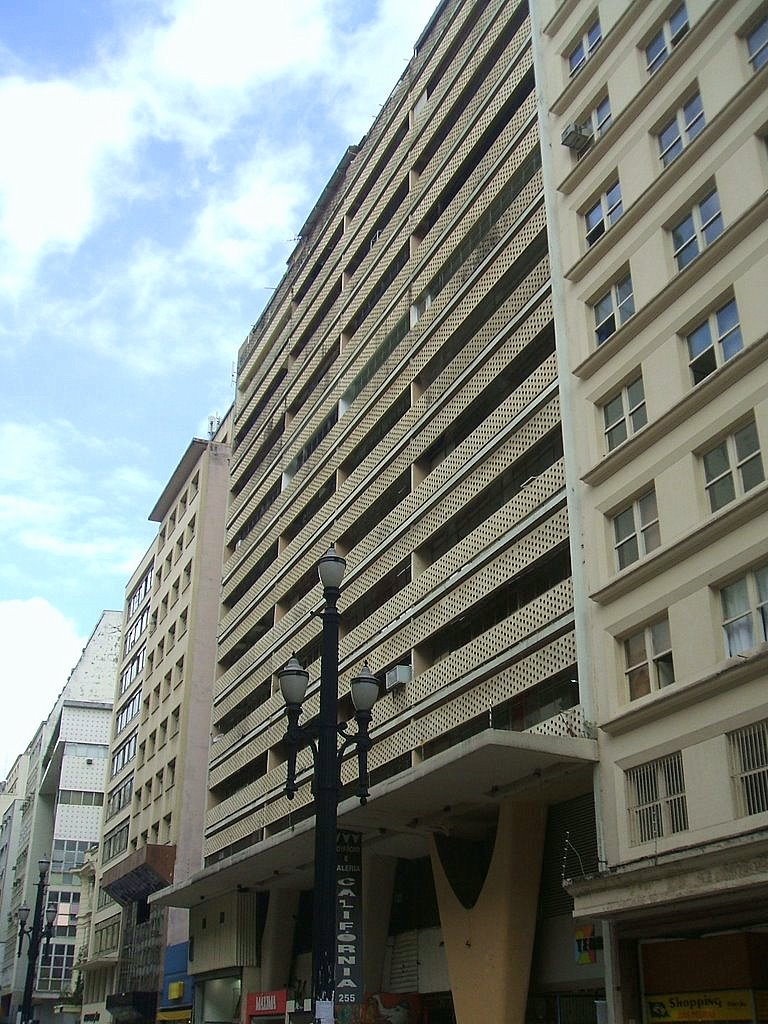
Edifício Califórnia, São Paulo, 1955

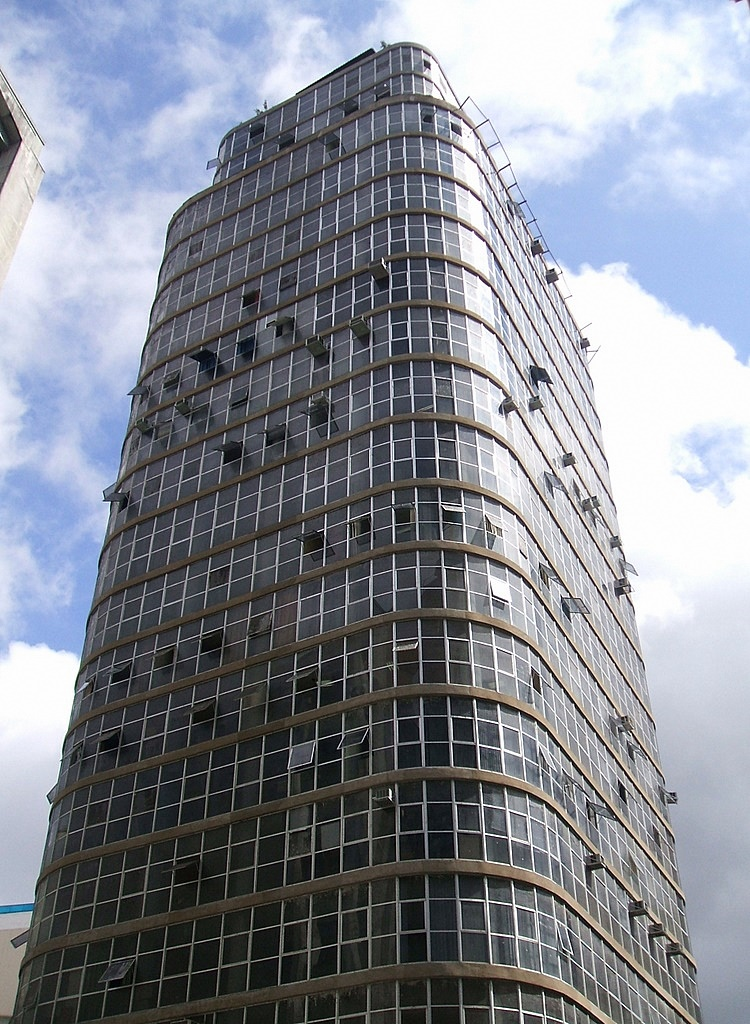
Edifício Triângulo, São Paulo, 1955

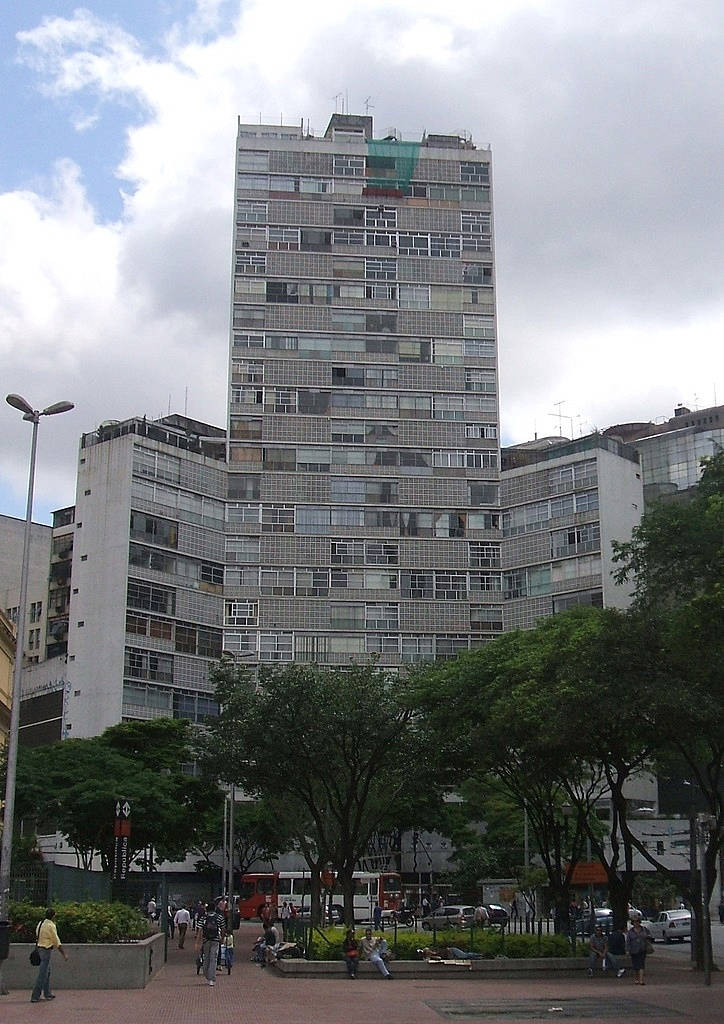
Edifício Eiffel, São Paulo, 1956

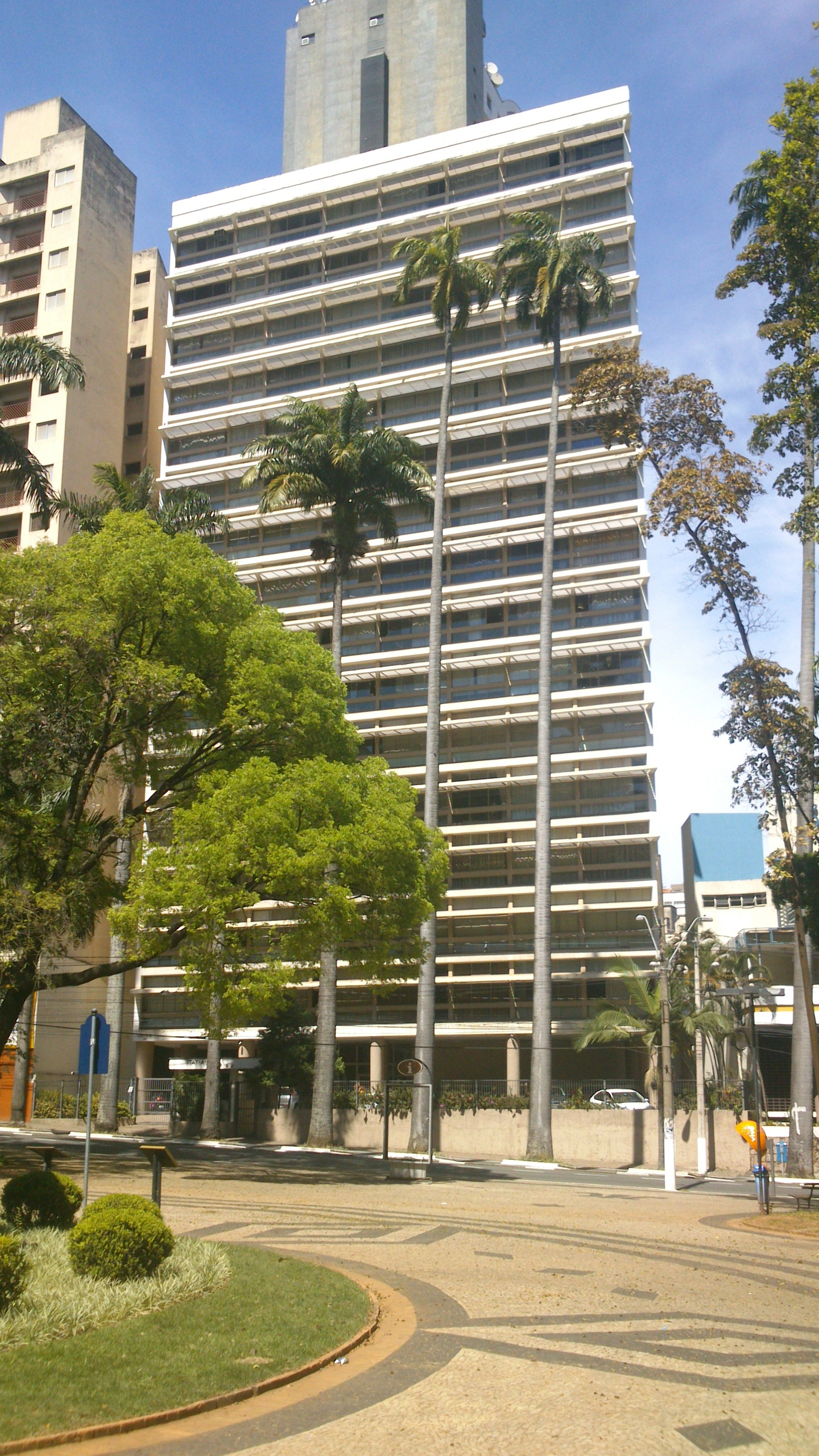
Edifício Itatiaia, Campinas, 1957

== Buildings in Brasília ==
At Brasília, Niemeyer designed:

- 1956 - Residência Provisória do Presidente da República (Catetinho).
- 1957 – Eixo Monumental (Monumental Axis).
- 1957 – Palácio da Alvorada (English: Palace of Dawn) Presidential residence.
- 1958 – Catedral Metropolitana Nossa Senhora Aparecida (Cathedral of Brasília).
- 1958 – Church of Our Lady of Fatima ("Igrejinha Nossa Senhora de Fátima"/"A Igrejinha da 307/308 Sul")
- 1958 – National Congress of Brazil (Congresso Nacional).
- 1958 – Supremo Tribunal Federal or STF (Supreme Federal Tribunal) Federal Supreme Court.
- 1958 – Palácio do Planalto (Palace of the Highlands) Presidential office.
- 1958 – Cláudio Santoro National Theater (National Theater).
- 1959 – Palácio do Jaburu (Palace of the Jabiru) Vice-presidential residence.
- 1960 – Praça dos Três Poderes (Square of the Three Powers).
- 1960 - Cine Brasília.
- 1962 – Palácio do Itamaraty (Ministry of External Relations).
- 1962 – Ministério da Justiça or "Palácio da Justiça" (Ministry of Justice).
- 1962 – Universidade de Brasília main building, the Central Institute of Science (Instituto Central de Ciências, ICC).
- 1965 – Aeroporto de Brasilia (Project was never built).
- 1970 - Escola Municipal Ginda Bloch (Teresópolis - RJ)
- 1985 – Panteão da Pátria e da Liberdade Tancredo Neves (Pantheon of the Fatherland and Freedom).
- 1986 – Casa do Cantador (Palácio da Poesia).
- 1987 – Memorial dos Povos Indígenas (Memorial of the Aboriginal Peoples) .
- 1995 – Superior Tribunal de Justiça.
- 2002 – Sede da Procuradoria Geral da República Brasileira (Attorney General's Office).
- 2006 – Cultural Complex of the Republic (Complexo Cultural da República).
  - Biblioteca Nacional Leonel de Moura Brizola (National Library of Brasília).
  - Museu Nacional Honestino Guimarães (National Museum Honestino Guimarães).
- 2006 – Tribunal Superior do Trabalho.
- 2008 – Sede da Ordem dos Advogados do Brasil.
- 2011 – Tribunal Superior Eleitoral
- 2012 – Torre de Televisão Digital (Brasília Digital Television Tower).
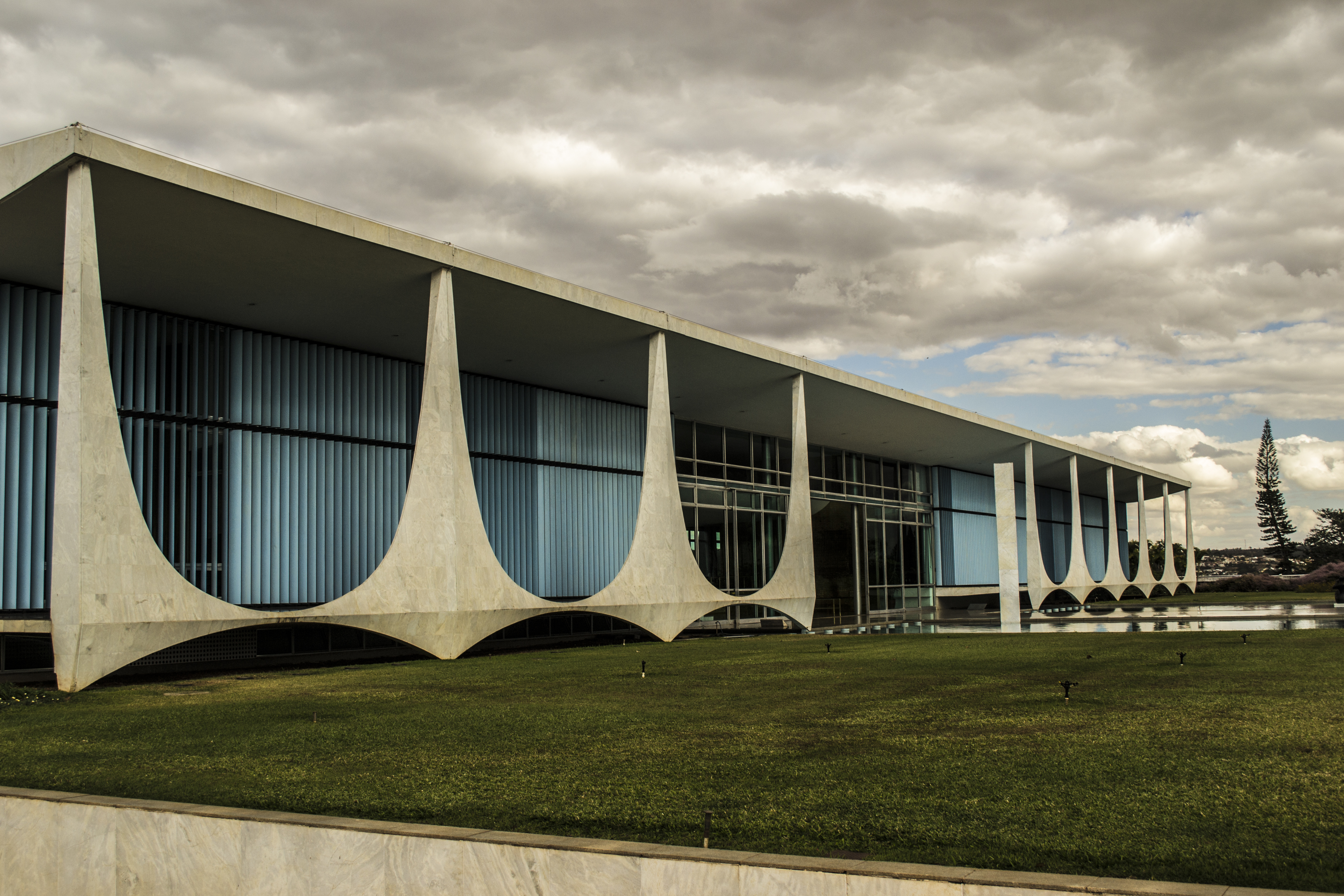
Palácio da Alvorada, Presidential residence, 1957

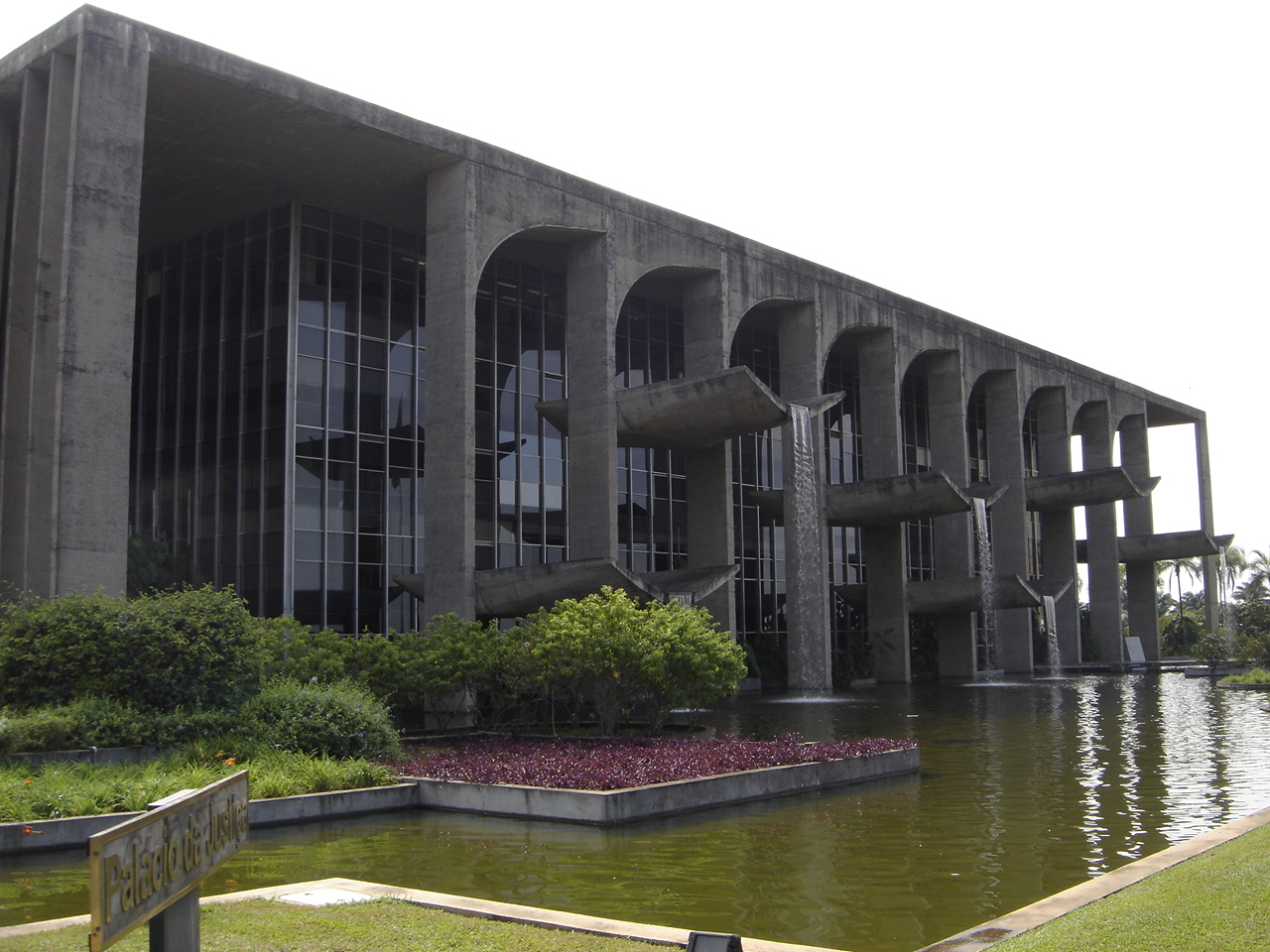
Palácio da Justiça (Ministry of Justice), 1962

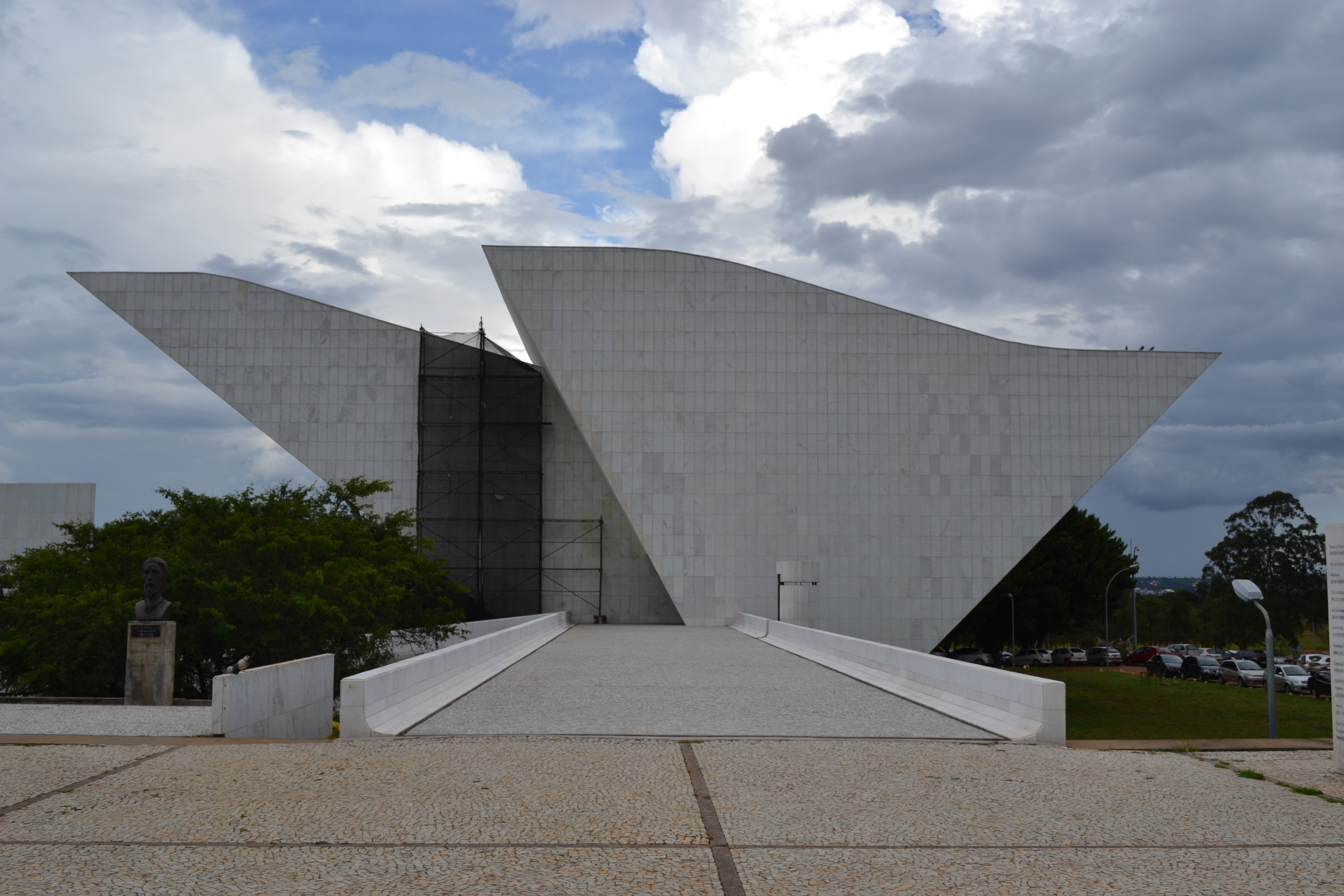
Panteão da Pátria e da Liberdade Tancredo Neves (during restoration in April 2012), 1985

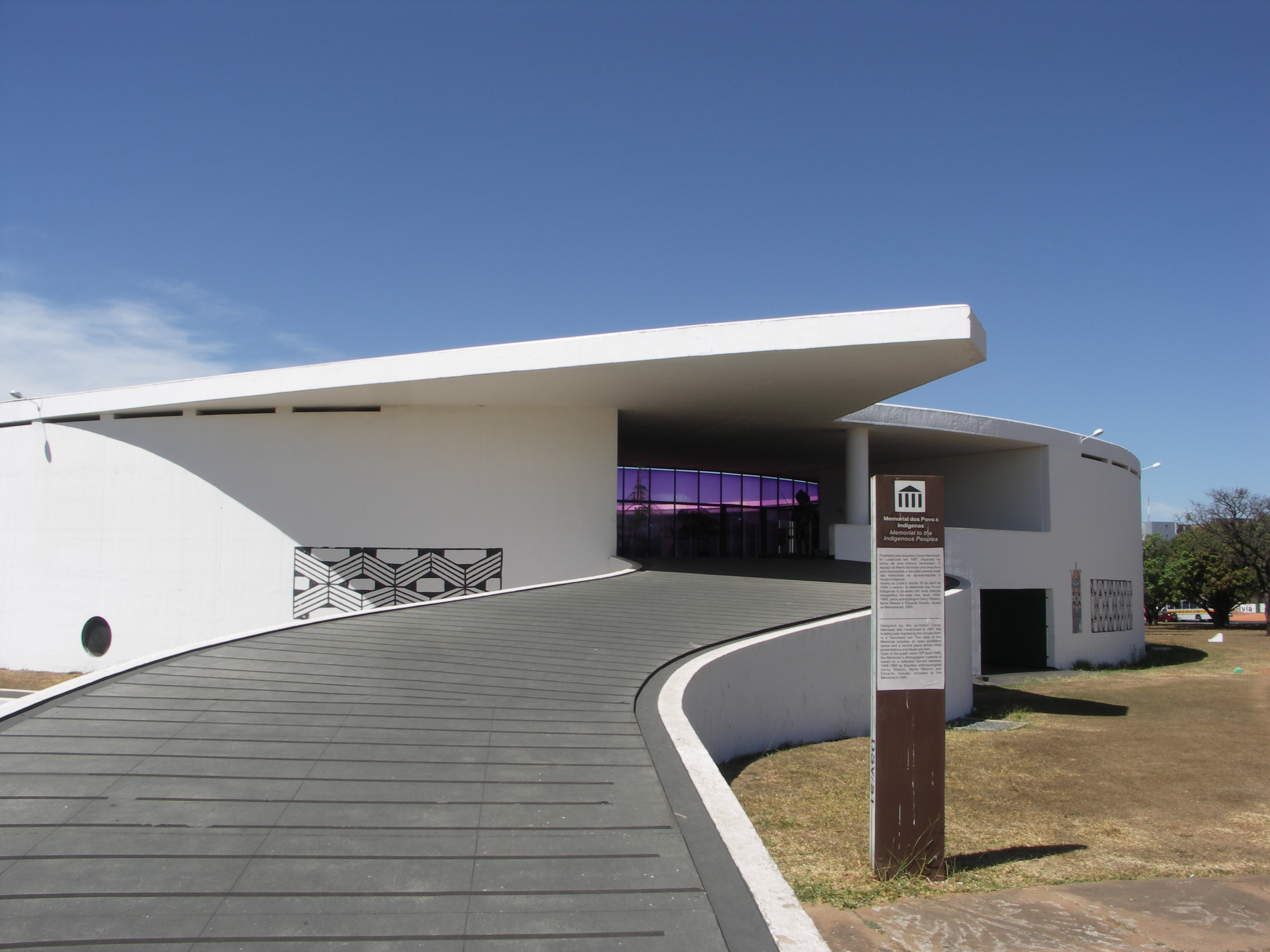
Memorial dos Povos Indígena (Memorial of the Aboriginal Peoples), 1987

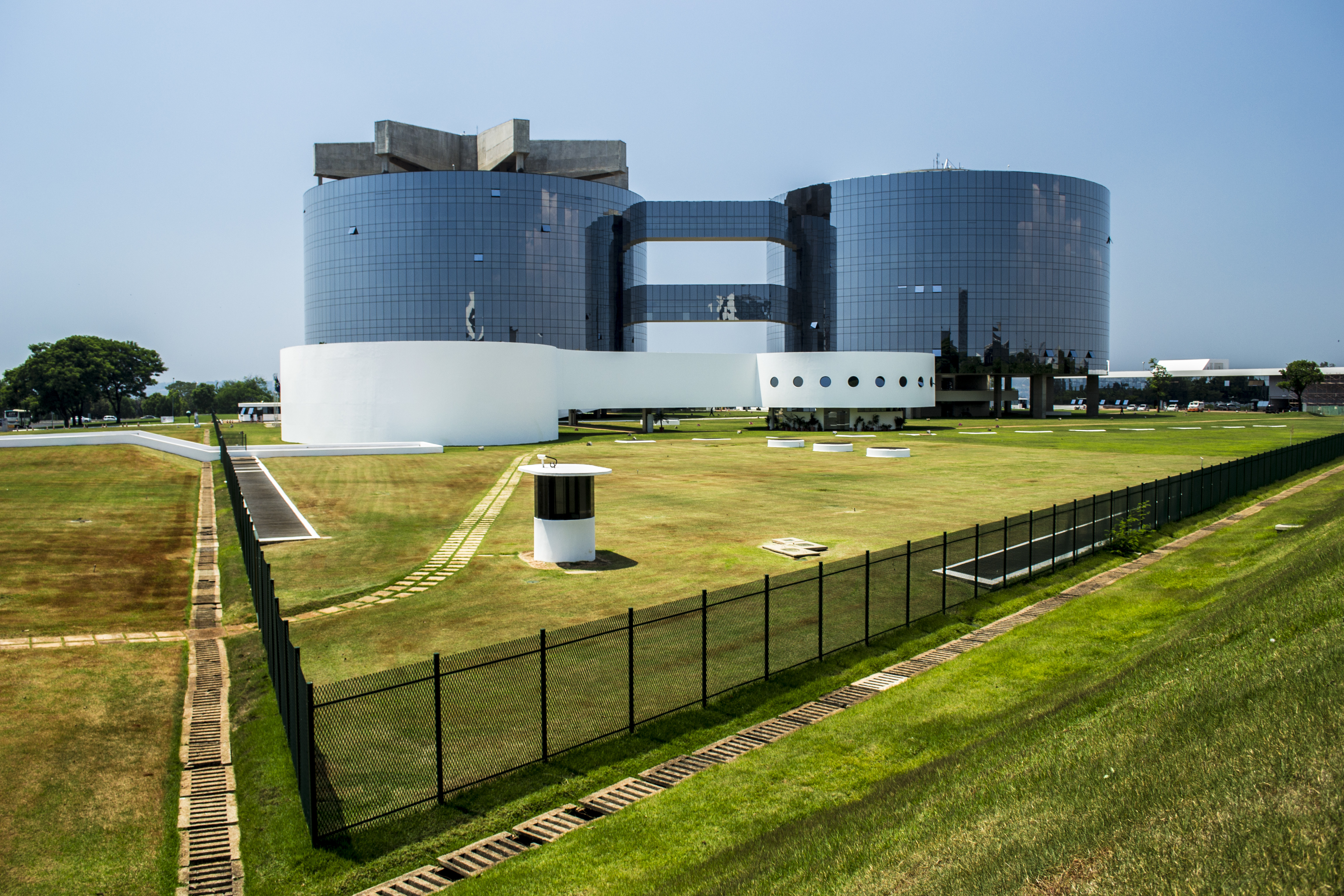
Sede da Procuradoria Geral da República Brasileira (Attorney General's Office), 2002

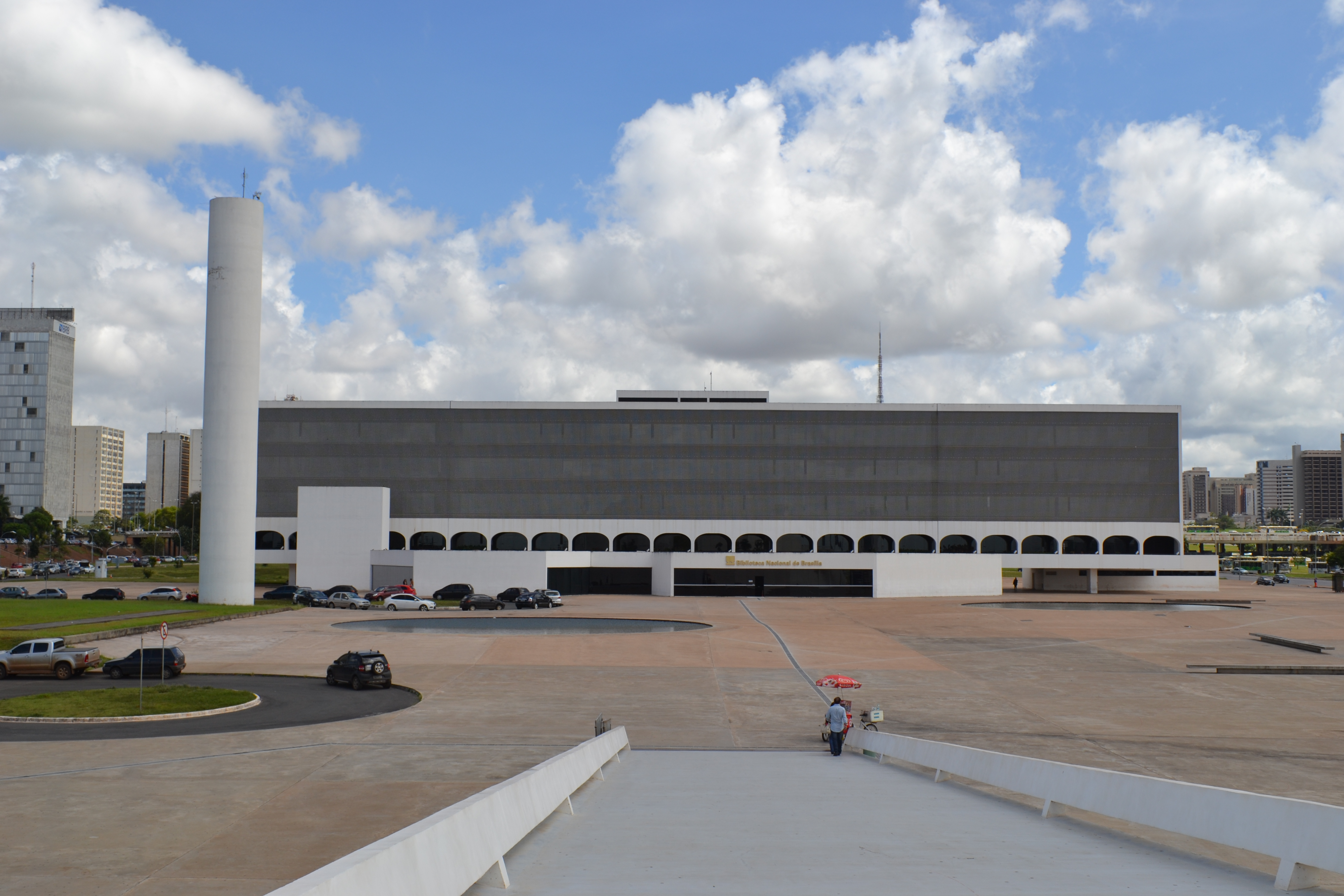
Biblioteca Nacional Leonel de Moura Brizola (National Library of Brasília), 2006

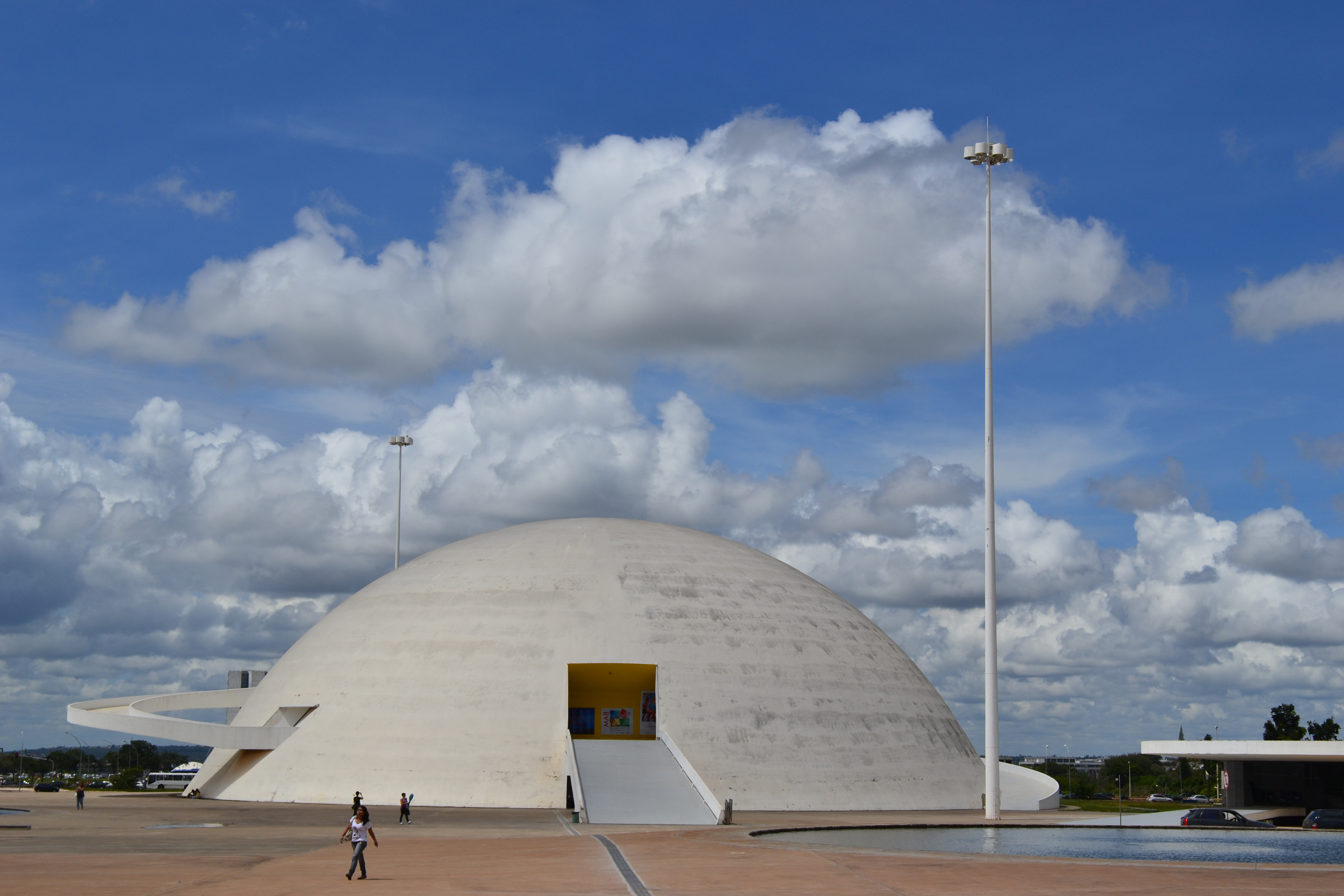
Museu Nacional Honestino Guimarães (National Museum Honestino Guimarães), 2006

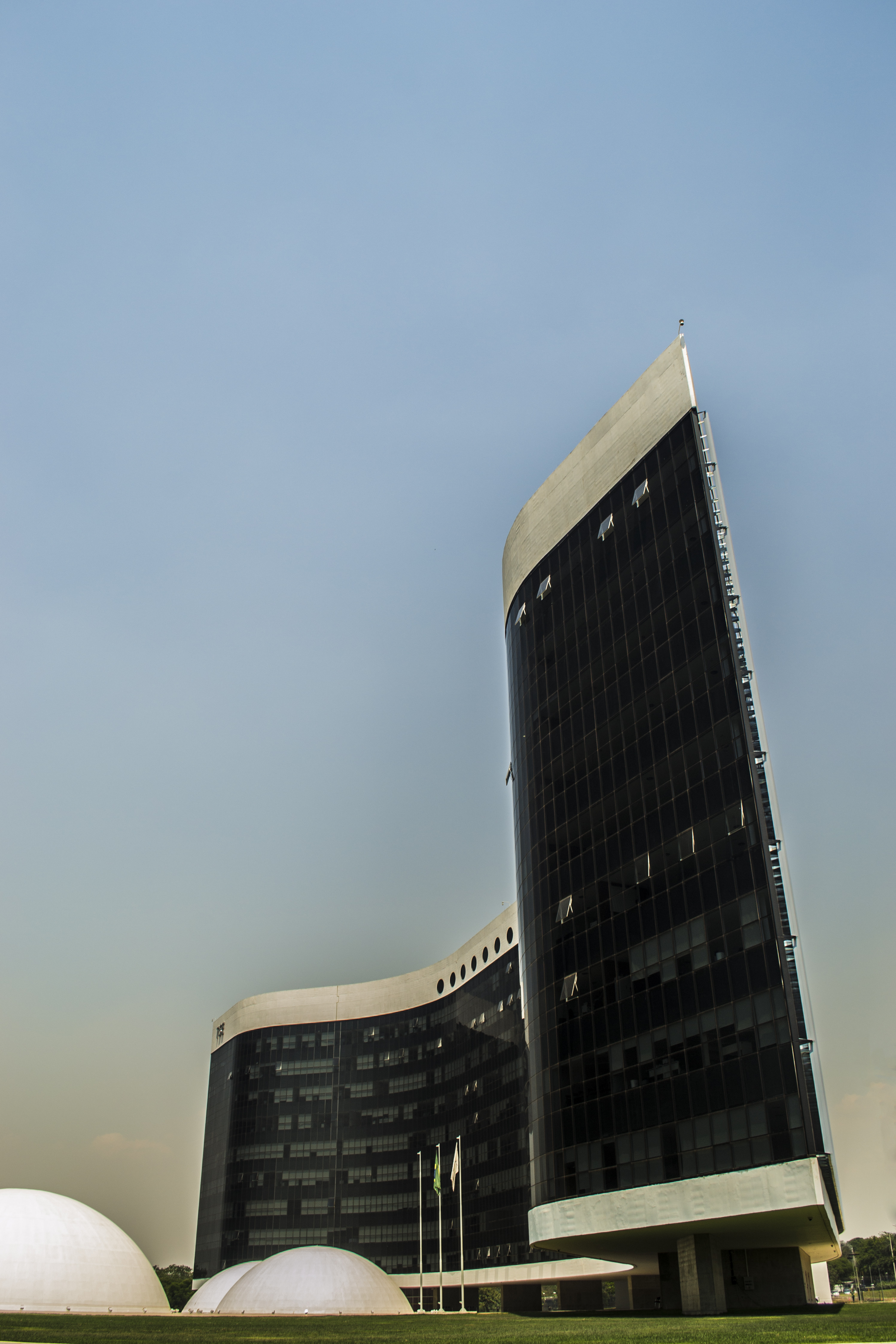
Tribunal Superior Eleitoral, 2011

== Exile years (1965–1985) ==
- 1962 – International Fair and Permanent Exhibition Hall, in Tripoli (Lebanon).
- 1963 – University of Haifa, Israel.
- 1965 – Headquarters of the French Communist Party ("PCF"), in Paris.
- 1968 – Centro Musical, Rio de Janeiro, Brazil.
- 1968 – Mondadori Palace, headquarters of the Mondadori publishing company, Italy.
- 1968 – Civic Center of Algiers
- 1968 – Mosque of Algiers
- 1969 – University of Science and Technology - Houari Boumediene in Algeria.
- 1969 – University of Constantine in Constantine, Algeria
- 1972 – Labour Council building of Bobigny, France - auditorium.
- 1975 – Fata Engineering Headquarters, Pianezza, Turin, Italy.
- 1975 – La Coupole D’Alger Arena in Chéraga, Algeria
- 1976 – Casino da Madeira (Pestana Casino Park) on Madeira Island, Portugal.
- 1980 – JK Memorial (Juscelino Kubitschek), Brasilia.
- 1981 – Leisure Island in Abu Dhabi
- 1981 – Cartiere Burgo Headquarters, San Mauro Torinese, Turin, Italy
- 1982 – Integrated Center for Public Education - CIEP public school system
- 1982 – Cultural Center, "The Volcano”, Le Havre
- 1983 – Sambadrome Marquês de Sapucaí (Sambadrome) in Rio de Janeiro.
- 1983 – Praça da Apoteose (Apotheosis Square) at the end of Marquês de Sapucaí Street, Rio de Janeiro
- 1985 – Panteão da Liberdade e da Democracia Tancredo Neves (Pantheon of Liberty and Democracy Tancredo Neves).
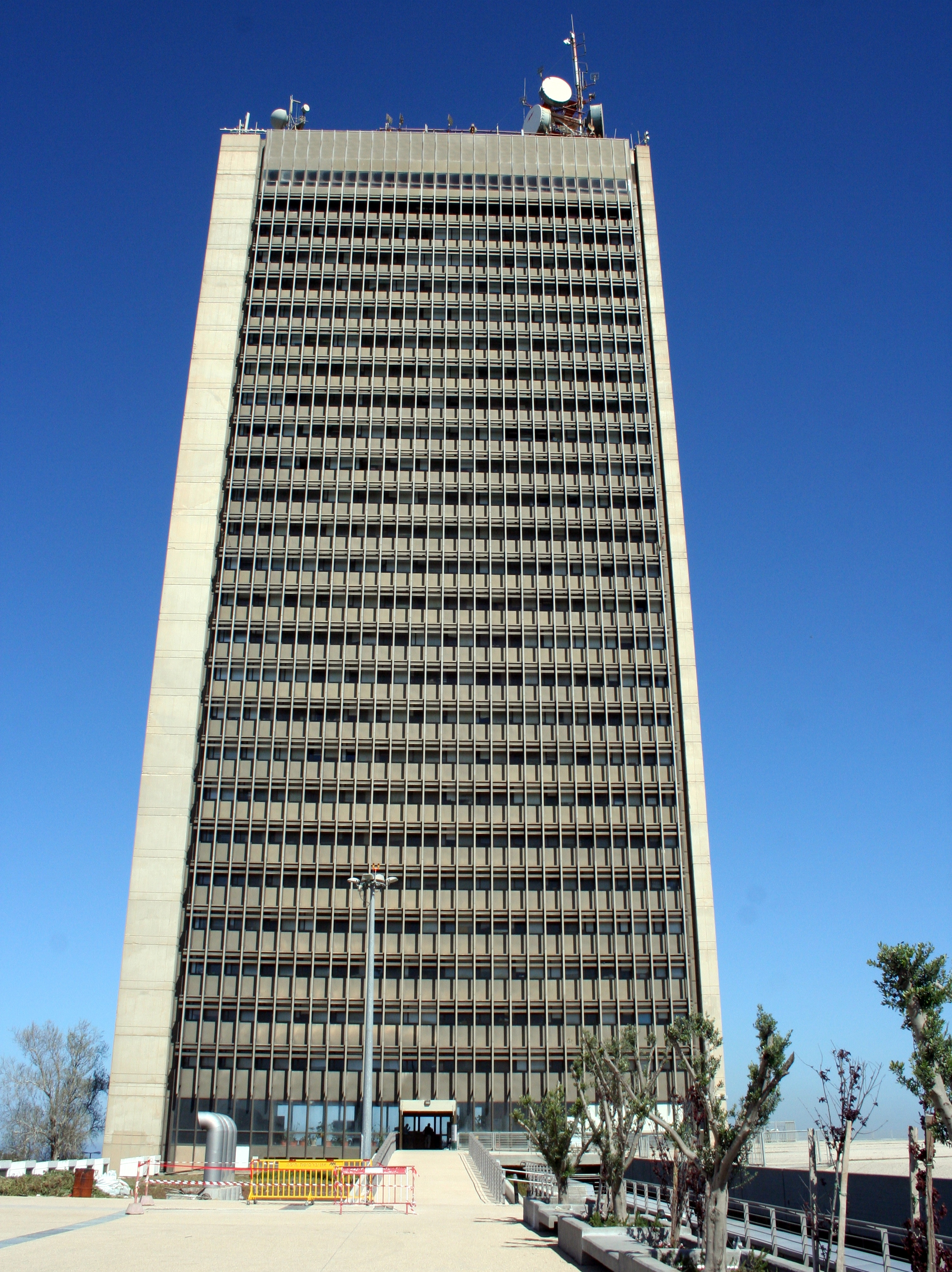
University of Haifa, Israel, 1963

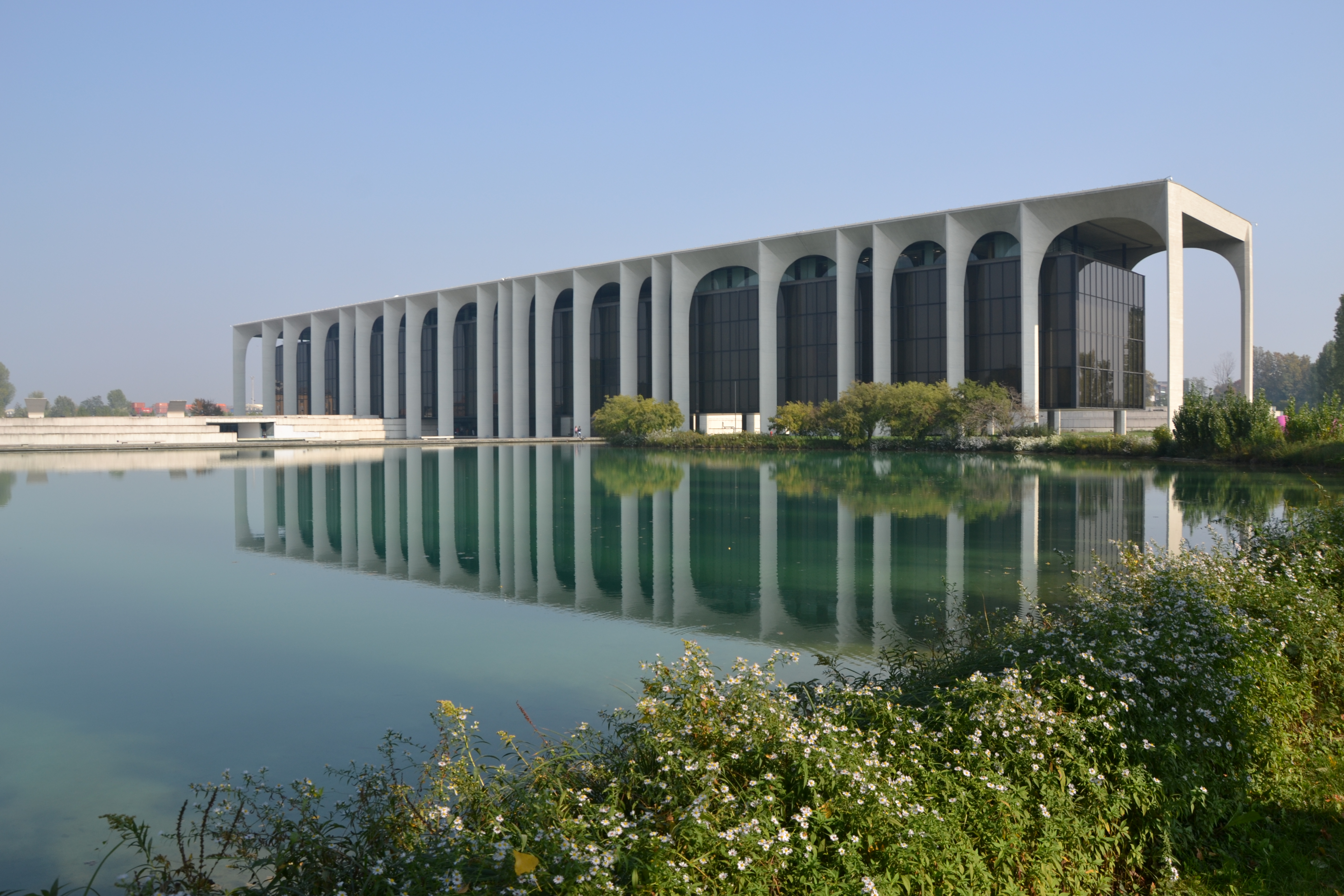
Mondadori Publishing headquarters, Milan, Italy

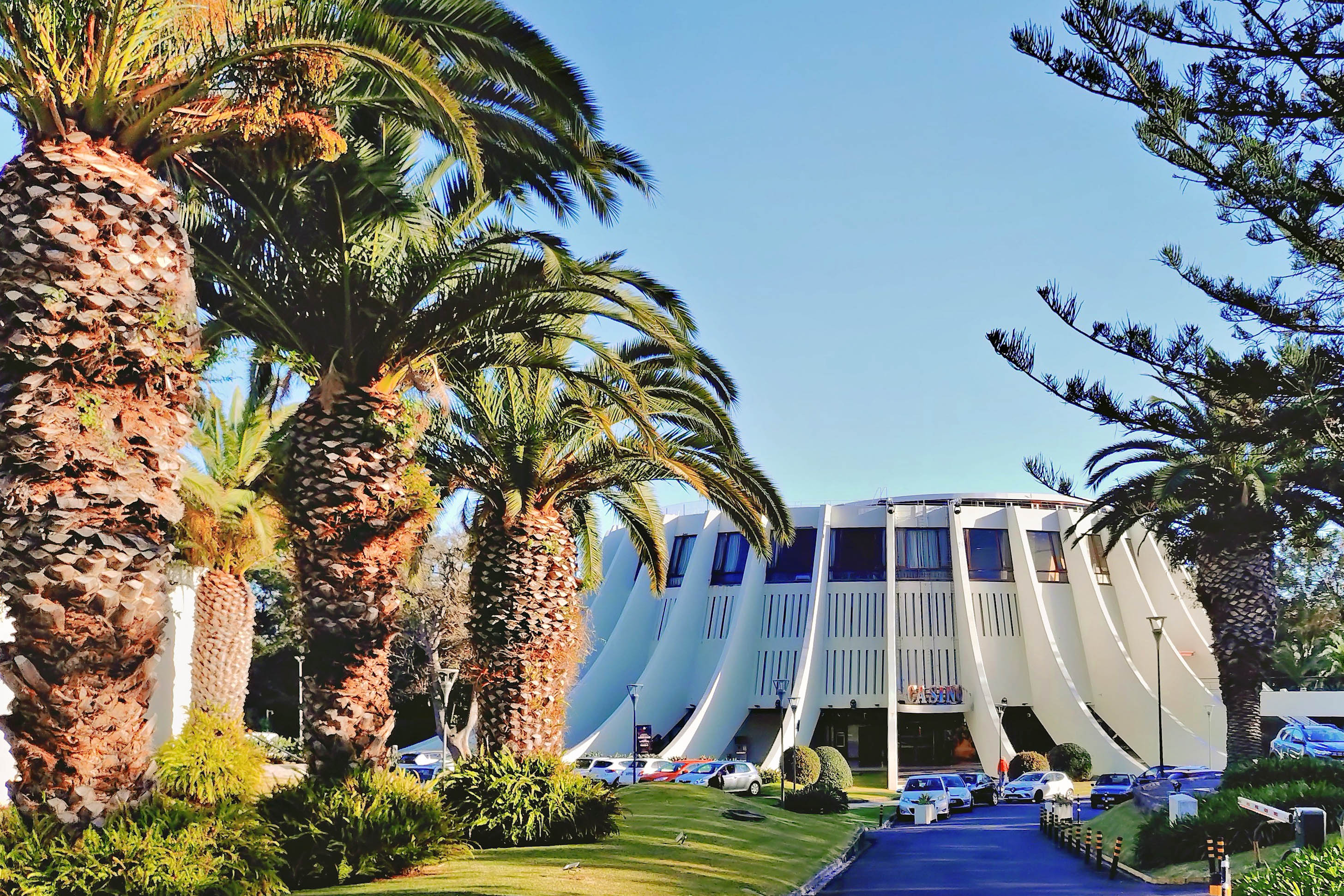
Casino da Madeira, Portugal, 1976

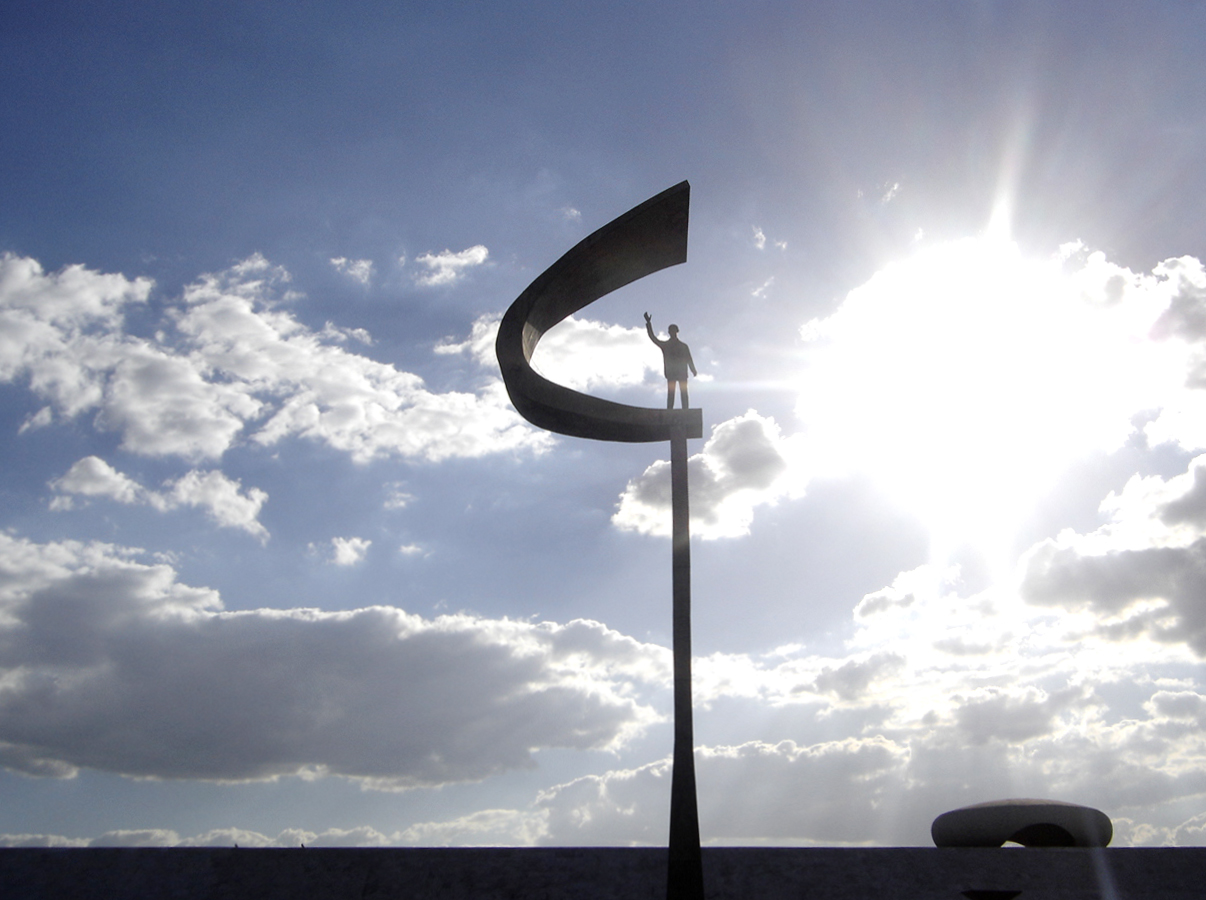
JK Memorial, Brasilia, 1980

== Return to Brazil (1985–2012) ==
- 1987–1989 – Latin America Memorial (Memorial da América Latina) in São Paulo
- 1988 – Londrina Bus Terminal (Terminal Rodoviário de Londrina) in Londrina, Paraná
- 1991–1996 – Niterói Contemporary Art Museum (Museu de Arte Contemporânea "MAC") in Niteroi, Rio de Janeiro
- 1991 – Latin American Parliament (Parlamento Latino Americano) in São Paulo
- 1993 – Anhembi Sambadrome (Sambódromo do Anhembi) in São Paulo
- 1997 – Niemeyer Way (Caminho Niemeyer) Theater, museums, restaurant, village square
- 1999–2005 – Ibirapuera Auditorium (Auditório do Ibirapuera) in Ibirapuera Park, São Paulo
- 2000–2010 – Auditorium Oscar Niemeyer Ravello, Amalfi Coast, Italy
- 2001–2002 – Oscar Niemeyer Museum in Curitiba, Paraná
- 2003–2010 – Centro Administrativo de Minas Gerais
- 2003 – Serpentine Gallery Pavilion in London
- 2004 – Itaipu Dam in Brazil
- 2005 – Itaipu Dam in Paraguay
- 2006–2011 – Oscar Niemeyer International Cultural Centre in the Principality of Asturias, Spain
- 2006 – Natal City Park in Natal, Rio Grande do Norte
- 2006 – 2008 – White Cape Station (Estação Cabo Branco) in João Pessoa, Paraíba
- 2007 – Popular Theatre of Niteroi (Teatro Popular de Niteroi) in Niteroi, Rio de Janeiro
- 2007 – Cultural Center (Centro Cultural em Valparaíso) in Valparaiso, Chile
- 2007 – University of Information Science (Universidade de Ciências e Informática) in Havana, Cuba
- 2008 – Puerto de La Musica in Rosário, Argentina
- 2008 – Parque da Cidade Dom Nivaldo Monte (city park) in Natal, Rio Grande do Norte
- 2008 – Caracol de Buritis in Buritis, Minas Gerais
- 2008 – Espaço Cultural Holoteca in Foz do Iguaçu, Paraná
- 2009 – Câmara Municipal de Poços de Caldas (city hall) in Poços de Caldas, Minas Gerais
- 2011 – Parque Dona Lindu (city park) in Recife, Pernambuco
- 2012 – Museum of Popular Arts of Paraíba (museum) in Campina Grande, Paraíba
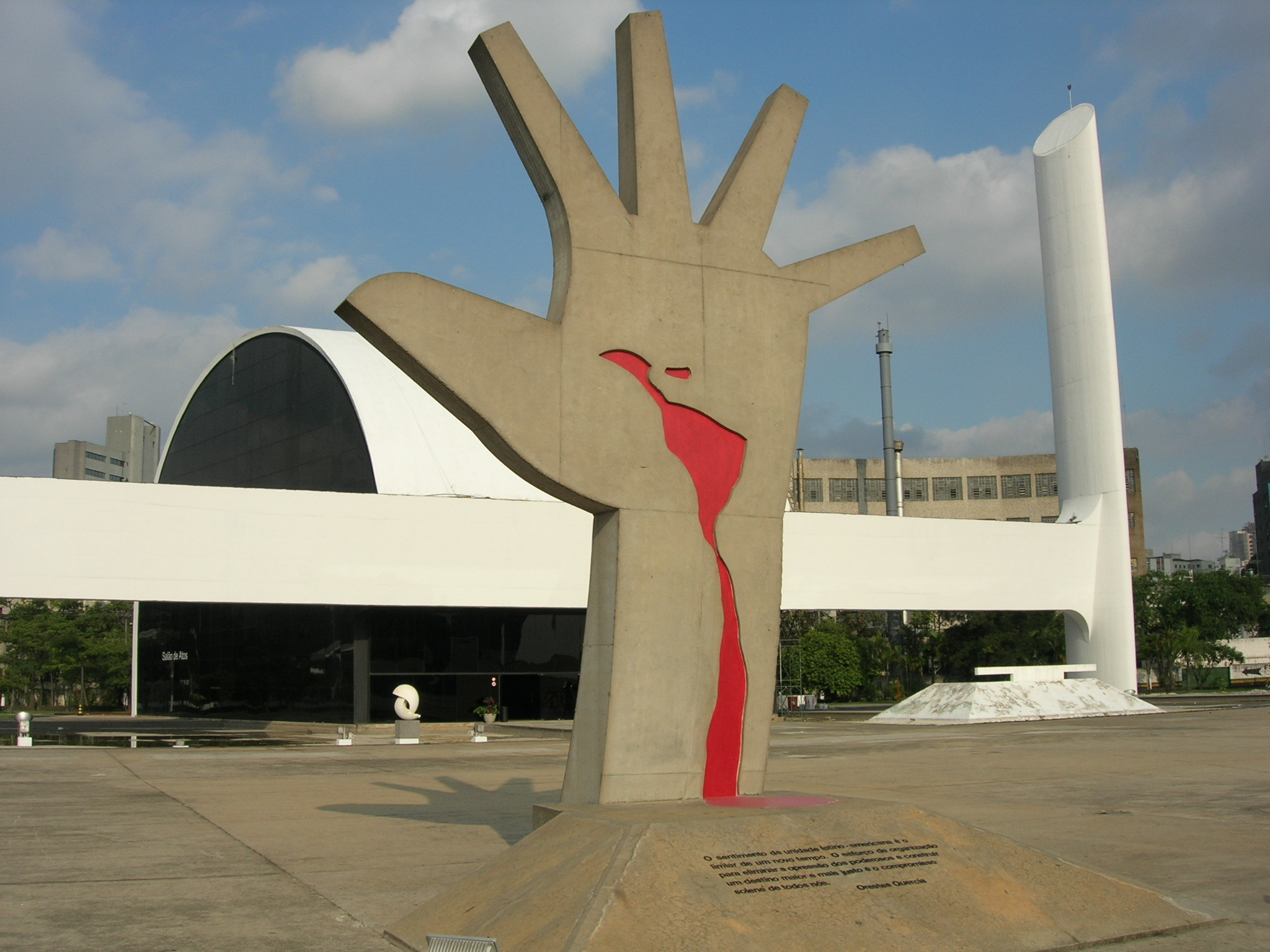
Latin America Memorial, São Paulo, 1987–89

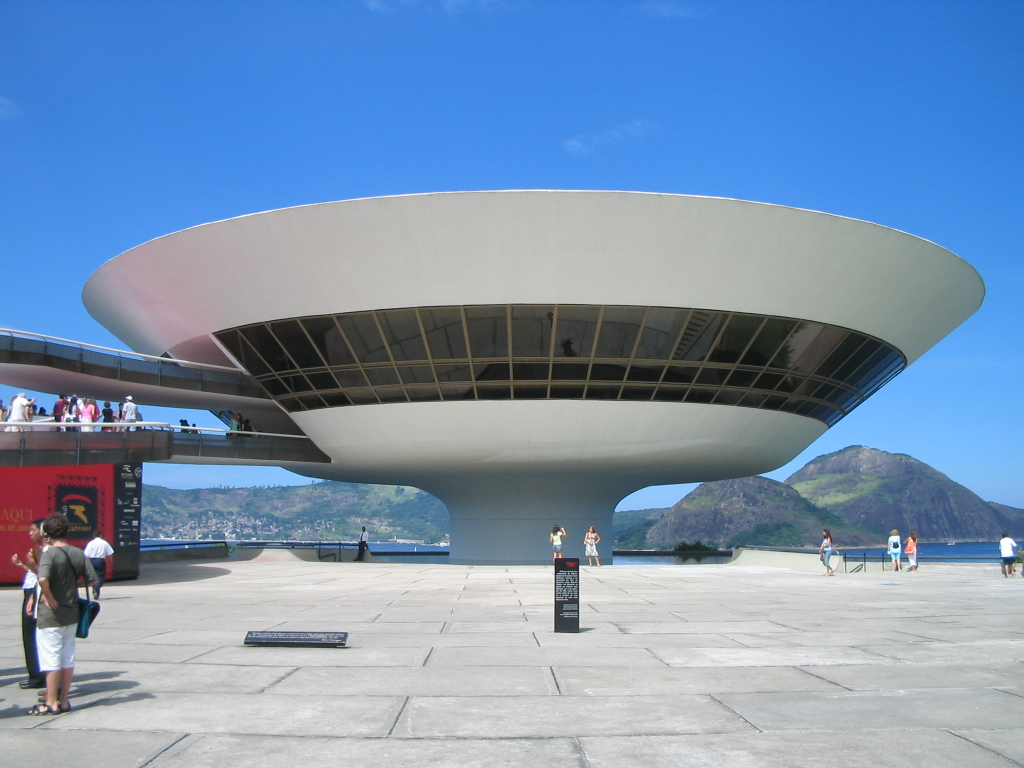
Niterói Contemporary Art Museum, Niterói, 1991–96

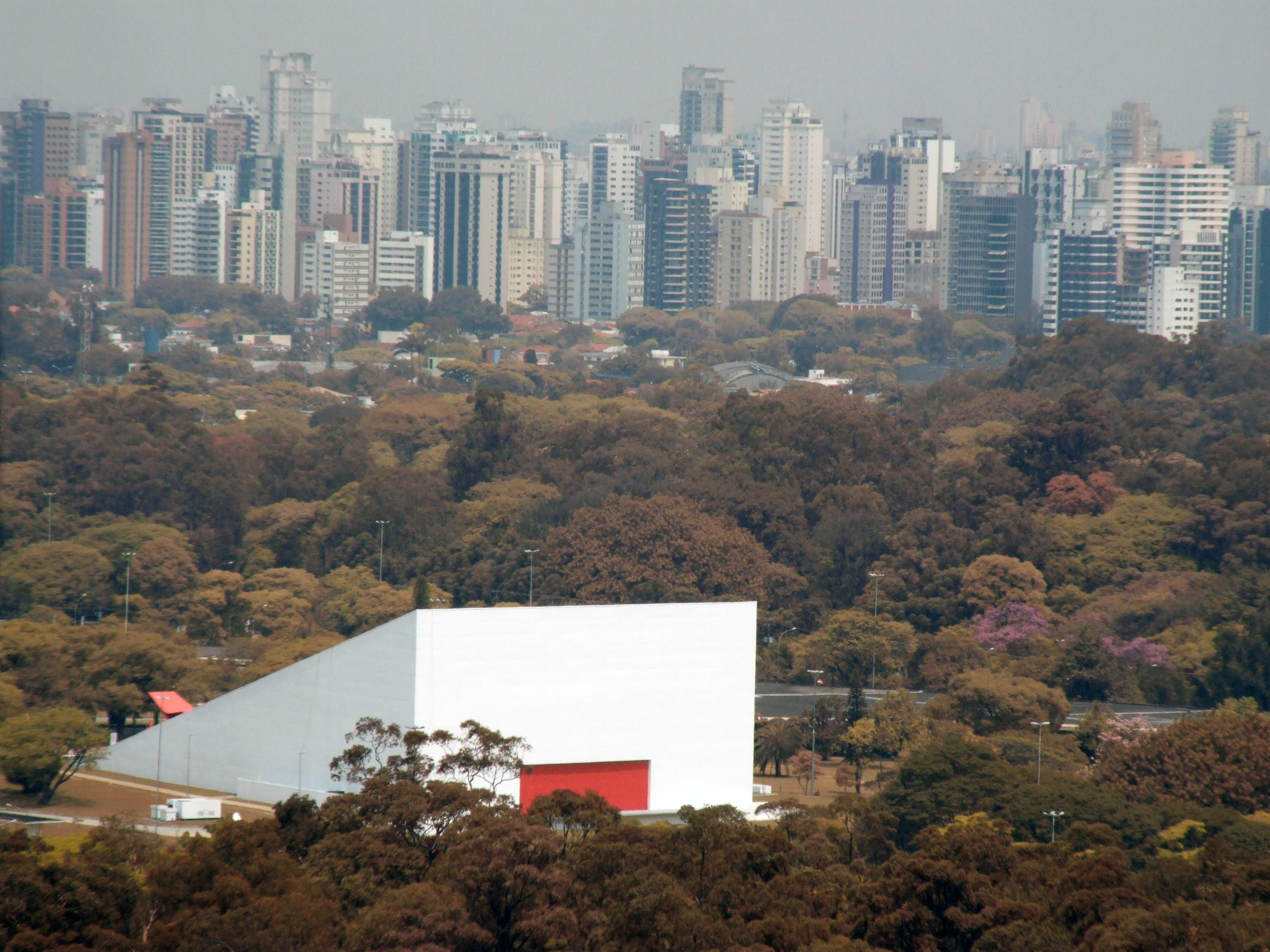
Ibirapuera Auditorium, São Paulo, 1999-2005

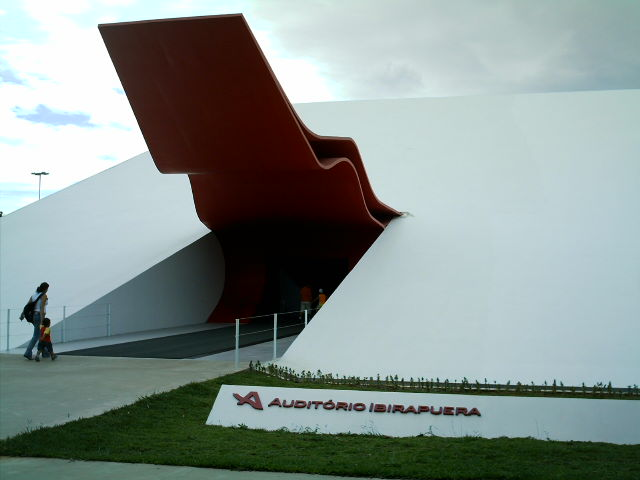
Ibirapuera Auditorium, São Paulo, 1999-2005

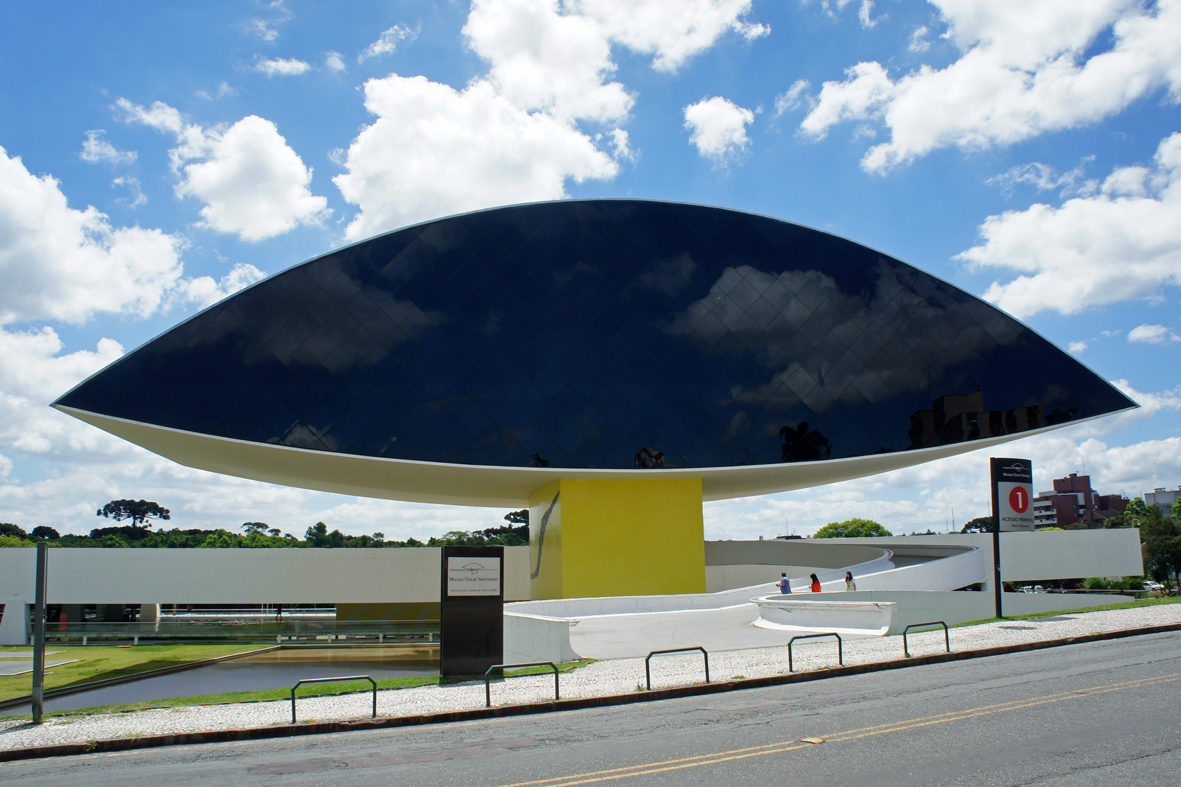
Oscar Niemeyer Museum, Curitiba, 2001–02

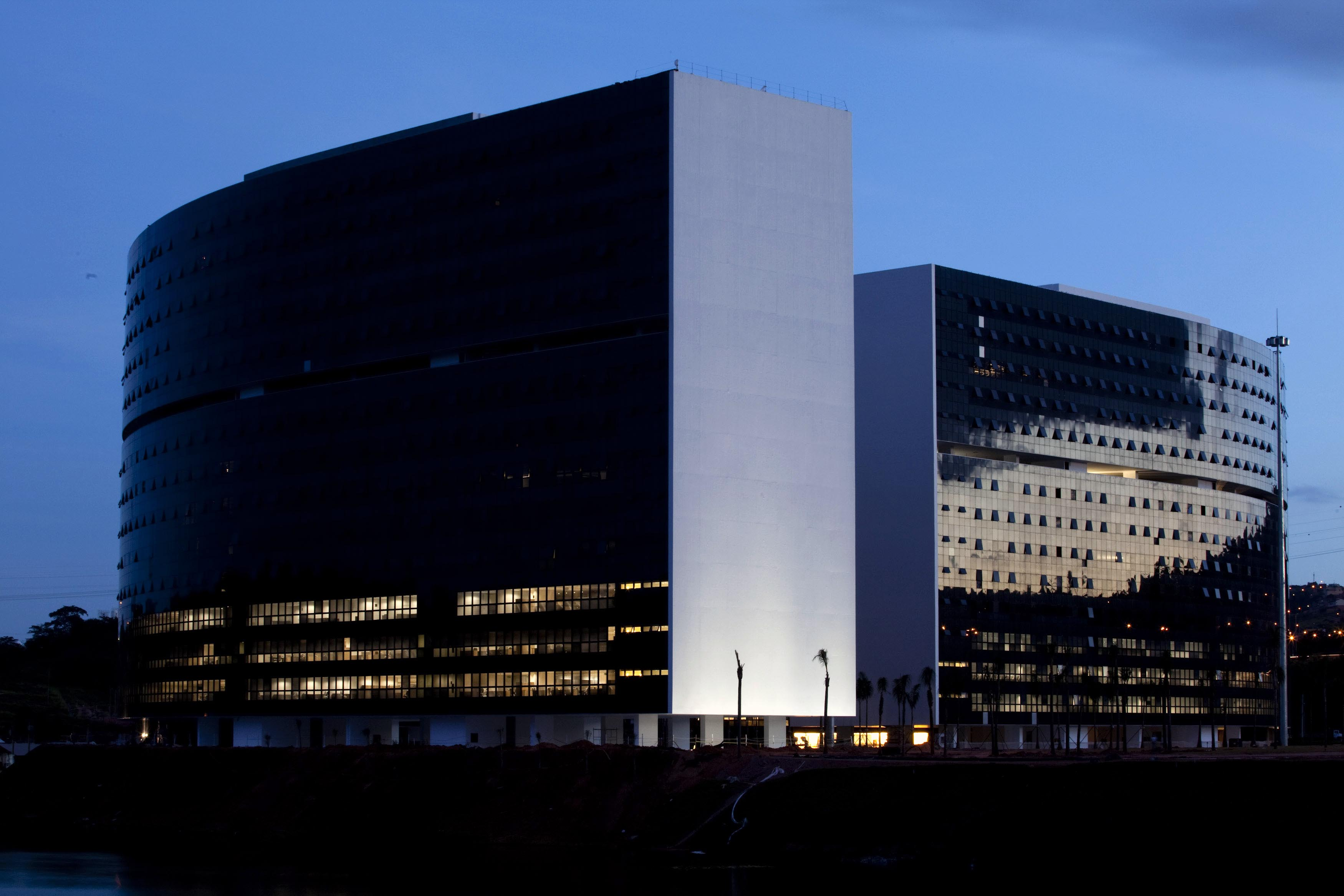
State Administrative City Building, Minas Gerais, 2003–10

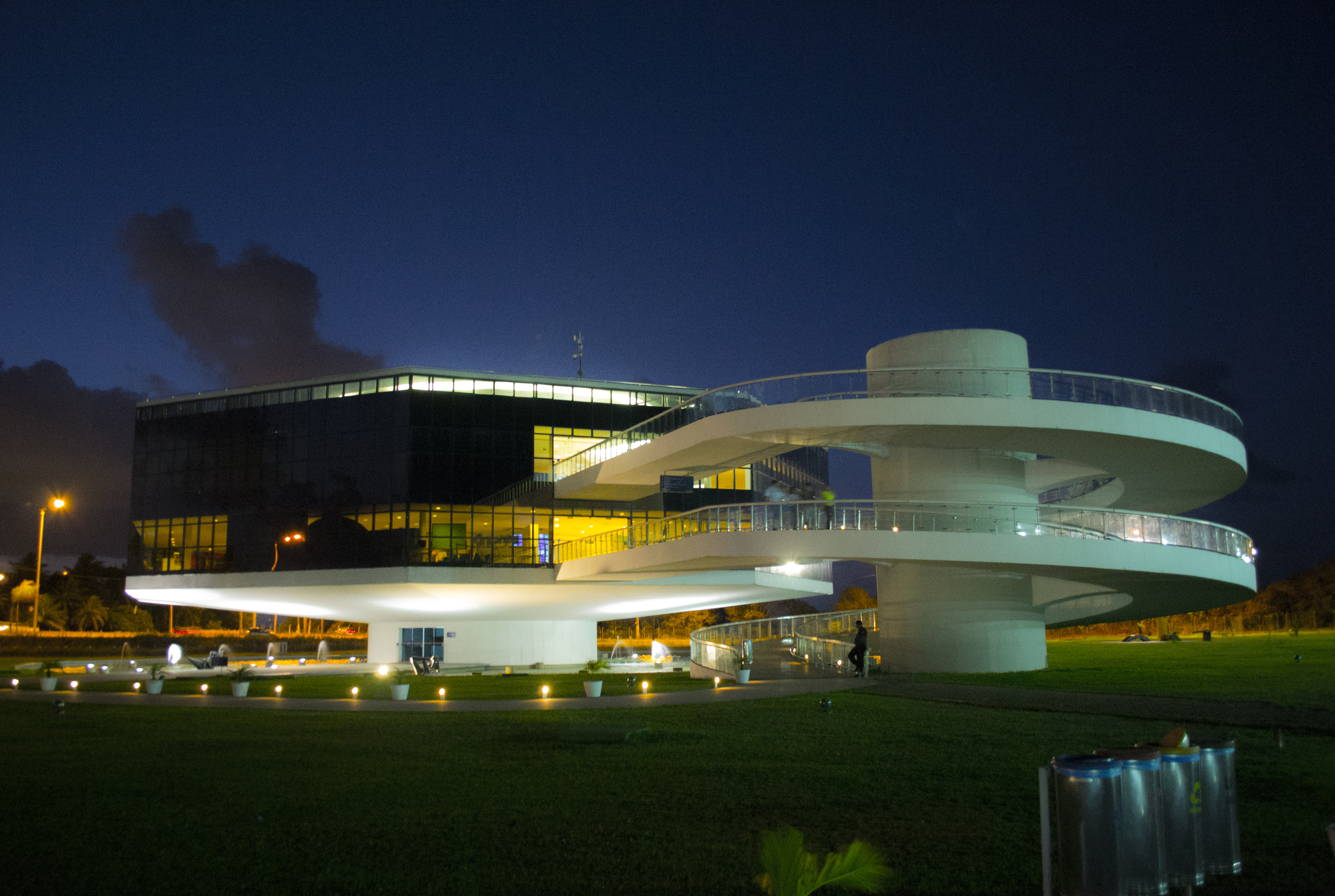
Estação Cabo Branco, 2006–08

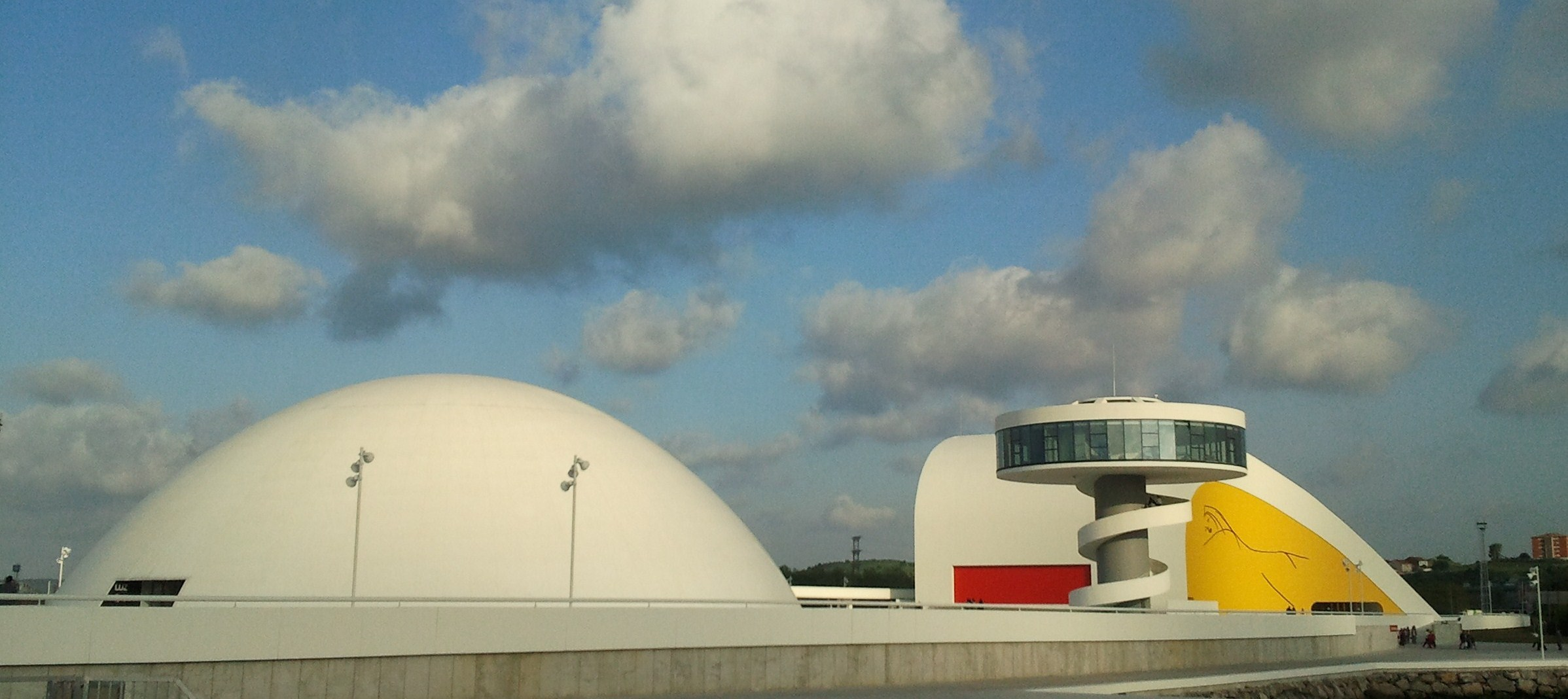
Centro Niemeyer, Spain, 2006–11

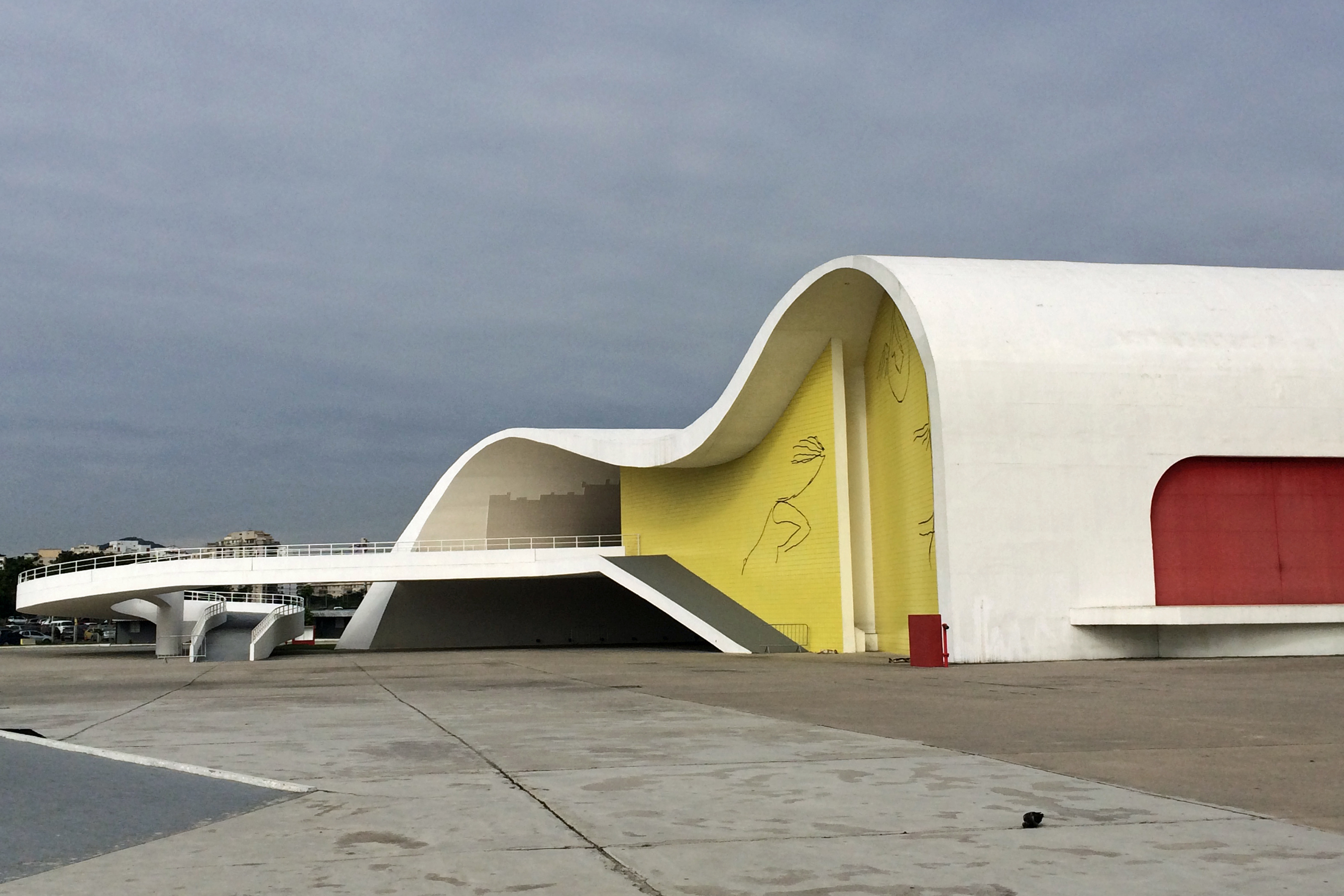
Popular Theatre of Niteroi, Niterói, 2007
