= Oscar Niemeyer Museum =

Art museum in Curitiba, Paraná, Brazil

Coordinates: 25°24′35″S 49°16′2″W

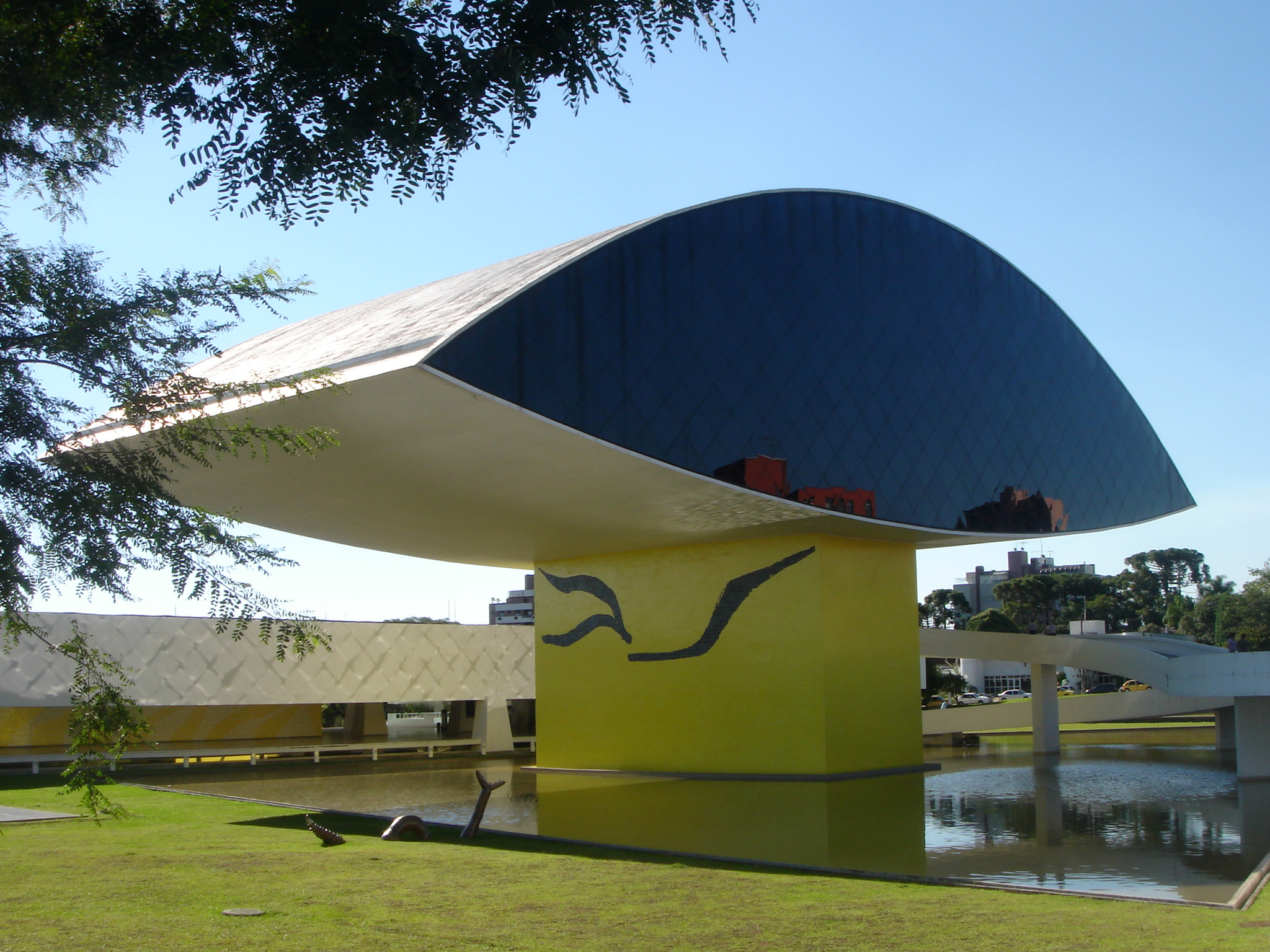
Oscar Niemeyer Museum, Curitiba, Brazil

The Oscar Niemeyer Museum (Portuguese: Museu Oscar Niemeyer) is located in the city of Curitiba, in the state of Paraná, in Brazil. It was inaugurated in 2002 with the name Novo Museu or New Museum. With the conclusion of remodeling and the construction of a new annex, it was reinaugurated on July 8, 2003, with the current denomination to honor its famous architect Oscar Niemeyer, who completed this project at 95 years of age. It is also known as Museu do Olho or Eye Museum, due to the design of the main building.

The museum focuses on the visual arts, architecture and design. For its magnificence, beauty and for the importance of the collection, it represents a cultural institution of international significance. The complex of two buildings, installed in an area of 35 thousand square meters (of which 19 thousand are dedicated to exhibition space), it is a true example of architecture allied with art. The first building was designed by Oscar Niemeyer in 1967, faithful to the style of the time, and conceived as an educational institute, which was opened in 1978.

The museum features many of Niemeyer's signature elements: bold geometric forms, sculptural curved volumes placed prominently to contrast with rectangular volumes, sinuous ramps for pedestrians, large areas of white painted concrete, and areas with vivid murals or paintings. Though rooted in modern architecture since his involvement in the international style, Niemeyer's designs have much in common with postmodern architecture as well and this is as contemporary a building as the artwork it displays.

== Niemeyer's Eye ==
The distinctive annex to the Oscar Niemeyer Museum is reminiscent of a human eye and fundamentally gave the museum a new identity. The annex was completed and opened to the public in 2003, and the Novo Museu was renamed the Oscar Niemeyer Museum in the same year. Constructed of reinforced concrete, the idiosyncratic, 30-meter tall structure sits above a pool of water and is connected to the main museum building by a futuristic underground walkway. The annex contains a large spiral stairway among its levels, and the two diamond-shaped façades of the "eye" of the building are constructed of glass and steel and provide natural light to an exhibit space.

== Grounds ==
The museum is located within a garden designed by the landscape architect Roberto Burle Marx, Niemeyer's previous collaborator on the design of Ibirapuera Park in São Paulo. The garden is further located within 144 square metres (1,550 ft^{2}) of woodland.

== See also ==
- List of Oscar Niemeyer works
- List of largest art museums
