= Cultural Complex of the Republic =

- Complexo Cultural da República
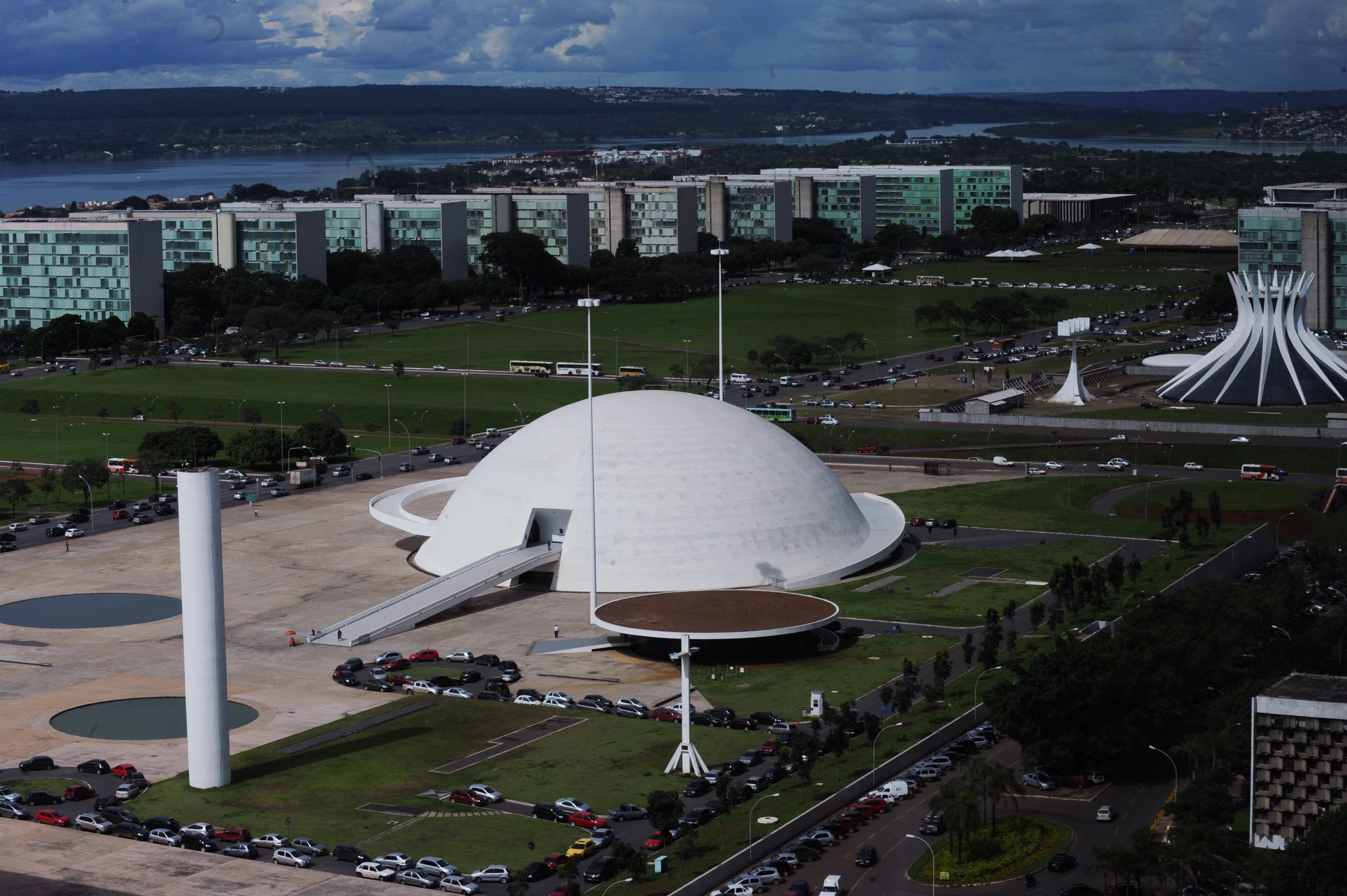
- Aerial view.

General information
- Town or city: Brasília
- Country: Brazil
- Coordinates: 15.796806863579423°S 47.87902141005989°W

The Complexo Cultural da República (Portuguese for "Cultural Complex of the Republic") is a cultural center located along the Eixo Monumental, in the city of Brasília, Brazil. It is formed by the National Library of Brasília and the National Museum of the Republic. Both buildings were designed by Pritzker Prize-winning Brazilian architect Oscar Niemeyer and inaugurated in 2006.

== National Library ==
The National Library of Brasília ("Biblioteca Nacional de Brasília" in Portuguese) occupies an area of 14,000 square metres (150,000 sq ft), consisting of reading and study rooms, auditorium and a collection of over 500,000 items.

== National Museum of the Republic ==
The National Museum of the Republic ("Museu Nacional Honestino Guimarães" in Portuguese), consists of a 14,500 square metres (156,000 sq ft) exhibit area, two 780-seat auditoriums, and a laboratory. The space is covered with a dome with ramps leading to the entrance. The building is mainly used to display temporary art exhibits.

=== Gallery ===
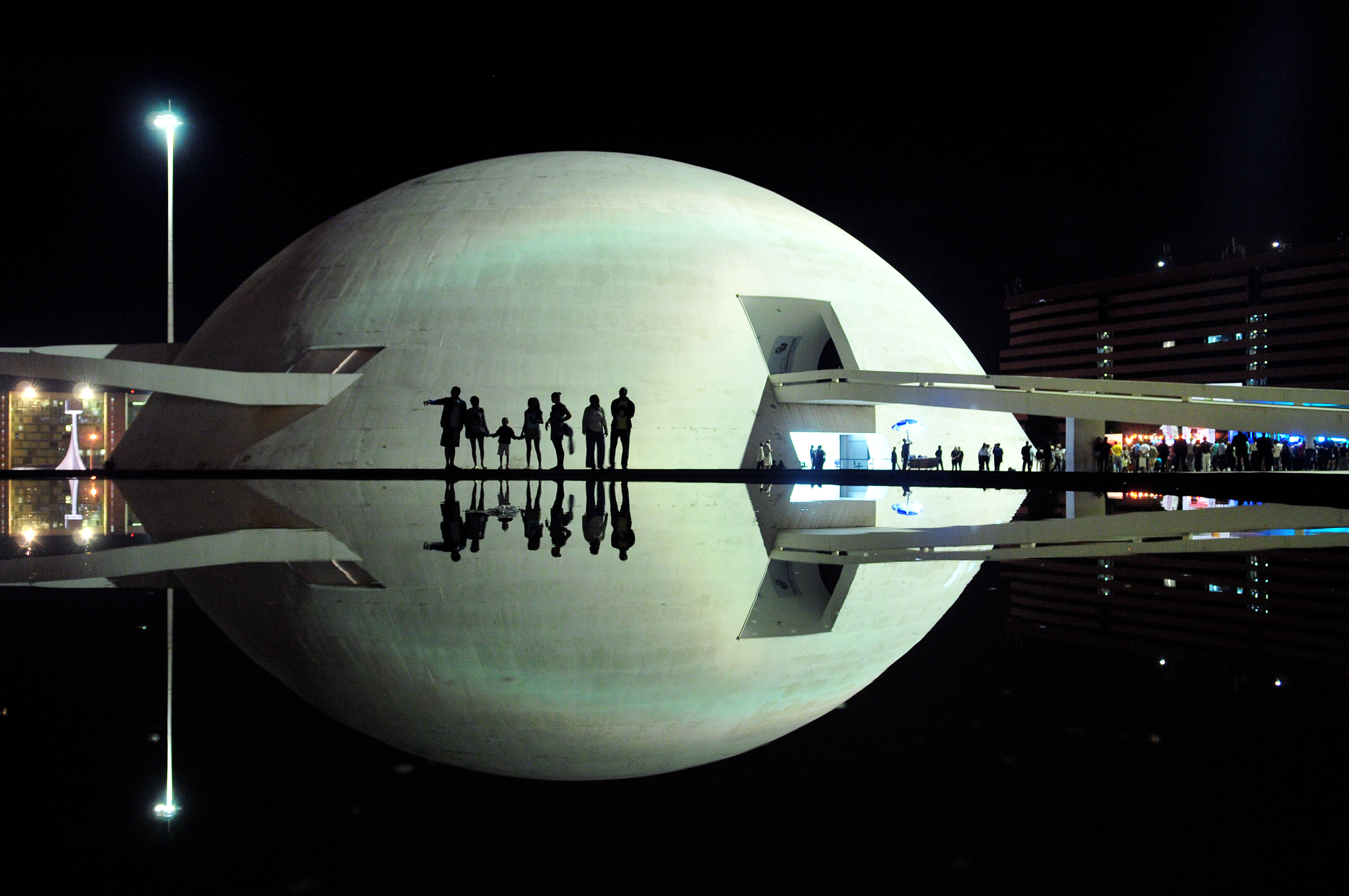
Museum exterior at night

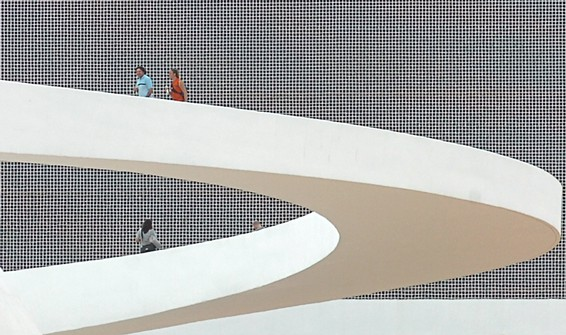
Exterior ramp

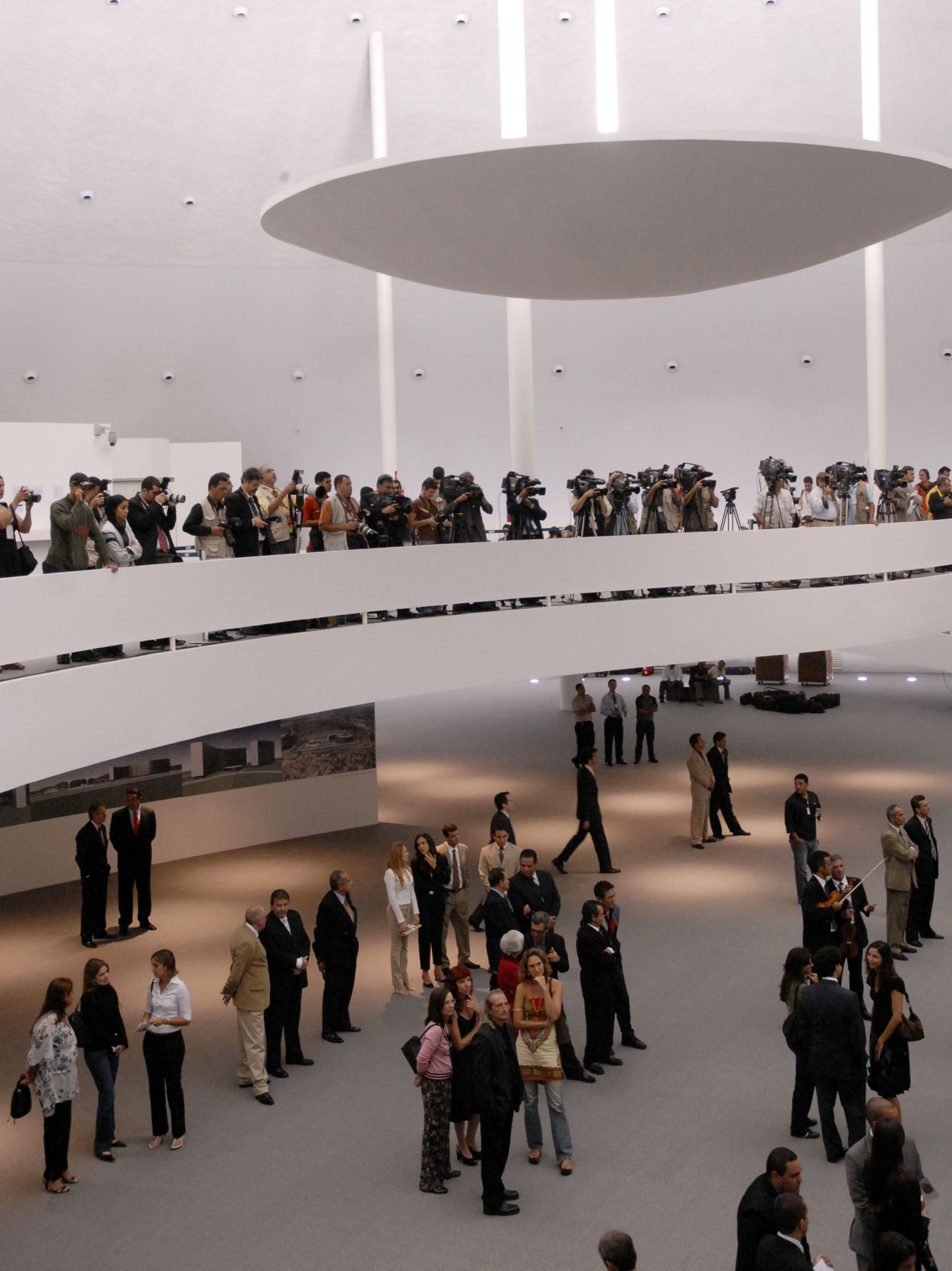
Interior of the museum

== See also ==
- National Historical Museum of Brazil (Rio de Janeiro)
- National Library of Brazil (Rio de Janeiro)
- National Museum of Brazil (Rio de Janeiro)
- List of Oscar Niemeyer works
