= Catetinho =

Brazilian presidential workplace

- Palácio do Catetinho
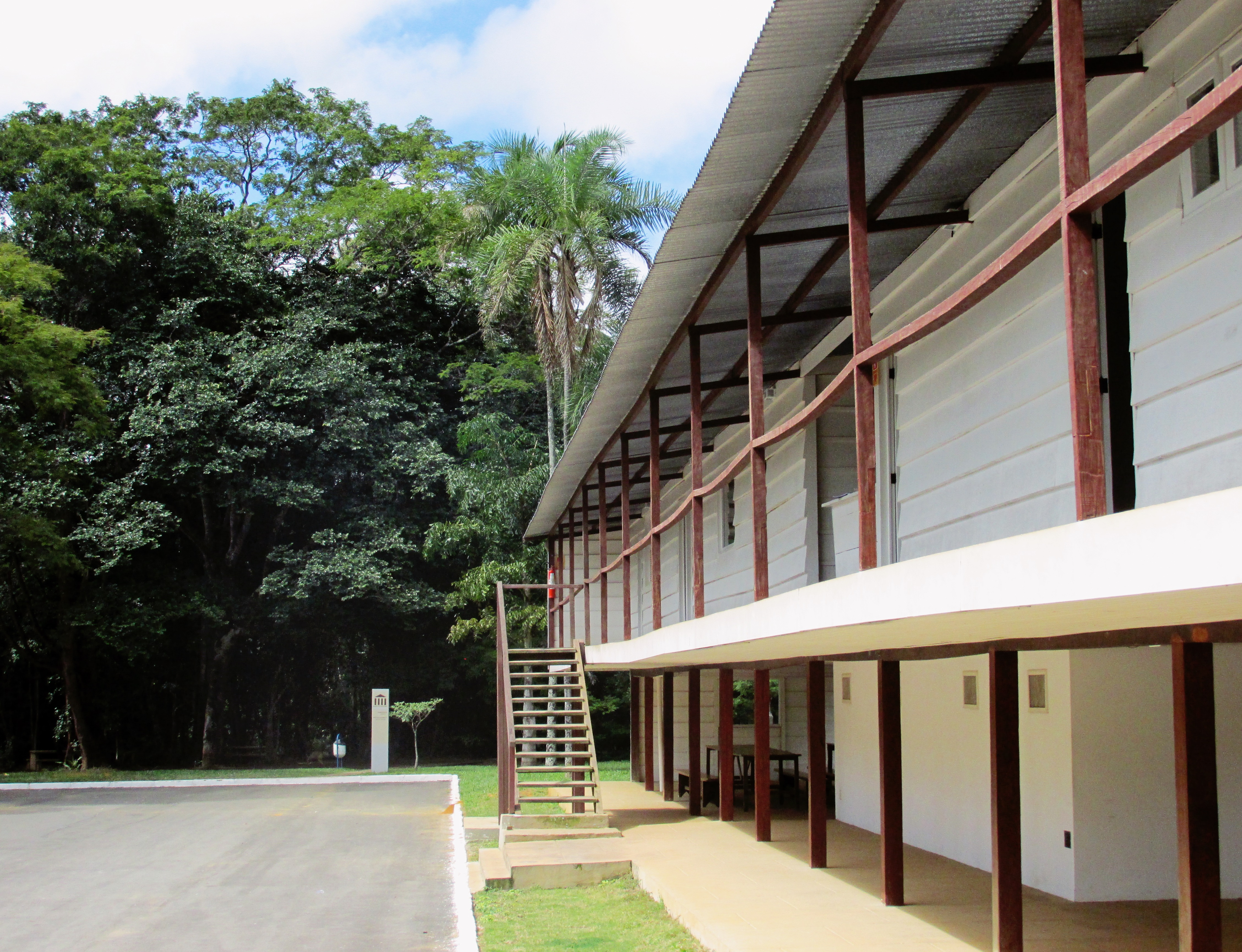
- The Catetinho, as seen today.

- Location within Brazil

General information
- Location: Federal District, Brazil, Brazil
- Coordinates: 15°56′51.1″S 47°59′18.5″W
- Construction started: 22 October 1956
- Completed: 31 October 1956
- Inaugurated: 10 November 1956
- Client: Brazilian government
- Owner: Brazilian government

Technical details
- Floor count: 2

Design and construction
- Architect: Oscar Niemeyer

National Historic Heritage of Brazil

The Catetinho was the first official workplace of the President of Brazil Juscelino Kubitschek.

== History ==
The name Catetinho is a diminutive of Catete Palace in Rio de Janeiro, which was the then-official residence of the Brazilian president. Designed by Oscar Niemeyer, it was built in just 10 days in November 1956. It is a simple wooden building earned it the nickname Palácio de Tábuas (Palace of Planks).

It was planned without comfort or official honours, so that the President didn't distance himself from the workers, who lived in shacks and tents.

It has been succeeded in its functions by the Palácio da Alvorada (the official presidential residence) and Palácio do Planalto (the official presidential workplace), both of which were also designed by Niemeyer.

== See also ==
- List of Oscar Niemeyer works
