= Natal City Park =

Park in Natal, Rio Grande do Norte, Brazil

Coordinates: 5°51′04″S 35°13′41″W

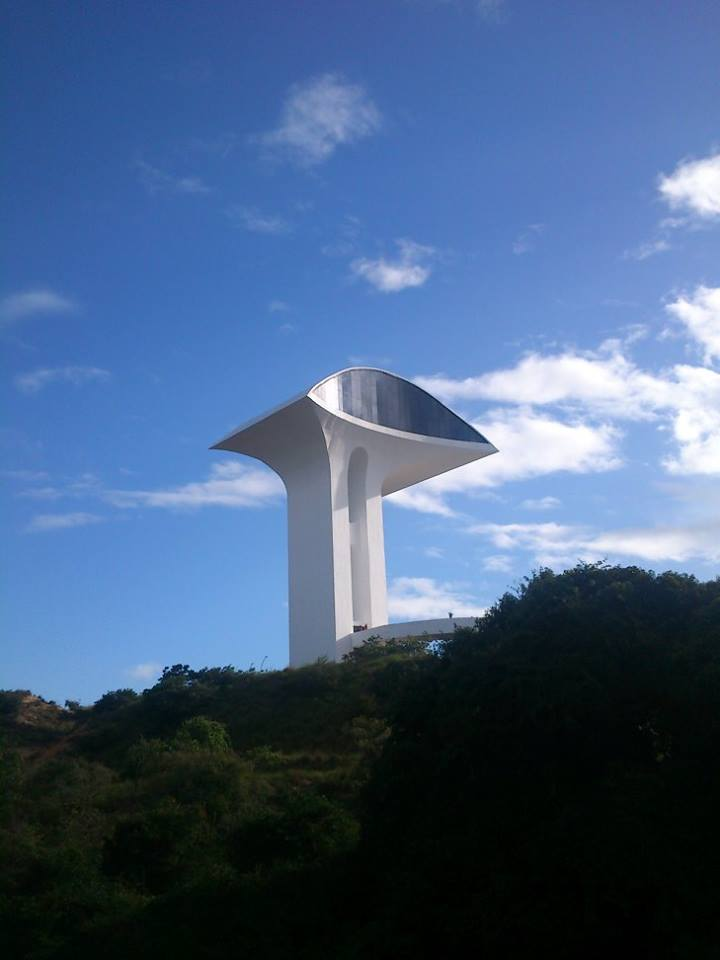
Natal City Park.

Parque da Cidade Dom Nivaldo Monte, colloquially known as Parque da Cidade, is a park in Natal, Rio Grande do Norte, Brazil. The City Park covers an area of 64 hectares, aimed at environmental preservation and education, and comprises eco-trails, jogging lanes, library, auditorium, orchidarium and more. The symbol of the Park is the central tower, 45 meter high, which houses the Memorial of the city. The Memorial maintains exhibits about the history and development of Natal.

The area where the Park is located is, like most of Natal, covered by dunes. It is the second largest Park in Natal, the biggest being Parque das Dunas. Like Parque das Dunas, this park has an important role in keeping the environment healthy: these parks function as a large filter, which captures rain water and cleans it before reaching the freatic sheet, they help maintain thermal balance, they shelter several species of fauna and flora, they add green space to the city.

The Park was designed by architect Oscar Niemeyer, who designed many important buildings in Brasília, the seat of United Nations in New York, and several other known buildings around the world.
