= Grande Hotel of Ouro Preto =

- Grande Hotel de Ouro Preto
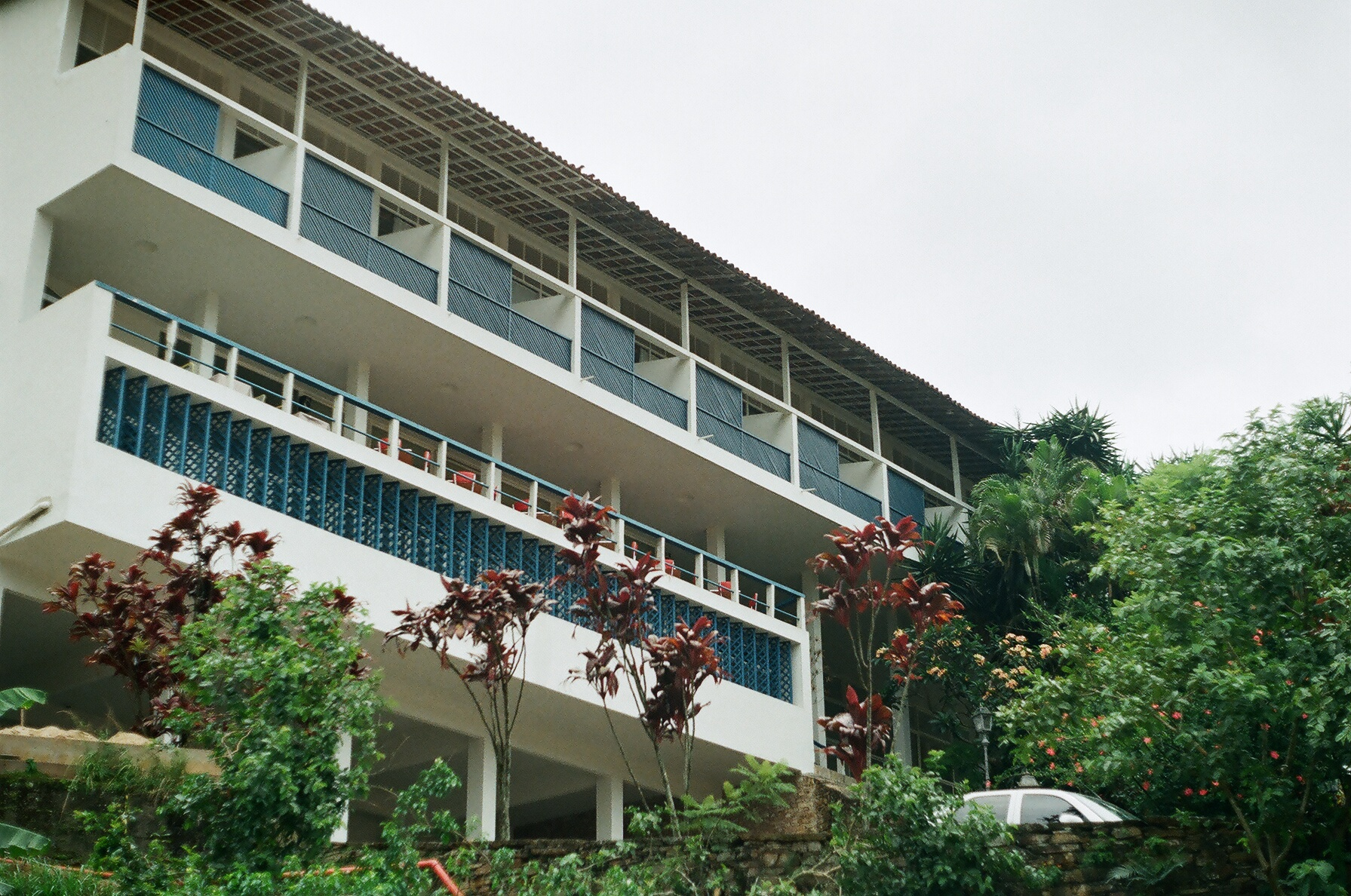
- Grande Hotel of Ouro Preto, Minas Gerais

- Location within Brazil

General information
- Architectural style: Modernist
- Location: Rua Senador Rocha Lagoa, 164, Centro, Ouro Preto, Minas Gerais, Ouro Preto, Minas Gerais, Brazil
- Coordinates: 20°23′03″S 43°30′18.4″W
- Completed: 1940
- Client: Serviço do Patrimônio Histórico e Artístico (SPHAN) and State Government of Minas Gerais

Design and construction
- Architect: Oscar Niemeyer
- Structural engineer: Alberto Santos
- Civil engineer: Domingos Buzatti
- Other designers: Hydraulic designer: Anton Dittl; Landscape designer: Roberto Burle Marx
- Main contractor: State Secretary of Roads and Public Works, Minas Gerais

Website
- grandehotelouropreto.com.br

The Grande Hotel of Ouro Preto (Portuguese: Grande Hotel de Ouro Preto) is a hotel in Ouro Preto, Minas Gerais, Brazil. Constructed in 1940, it is one of the early works of the architect Oscar Niemeyer (1907–2012). The Serviço do Patrimônio Histórico e Artístico (SPHAN), the precursor to the Brazilian National Institute of Historic and Artistic Heritage, designated the city of Ouro Preto as a historic site and domestic tourist destination. SPHAN, in consultation with the architect Lúcio Costa, commissioned the construction of a modern hotel in the city. Niemeyer's design was chosen over that of Carlos Leão (1906-1983).
