= Pampulha Art Museum =

Museum in Belo Horizonte, Brazil

Pampulha art museum
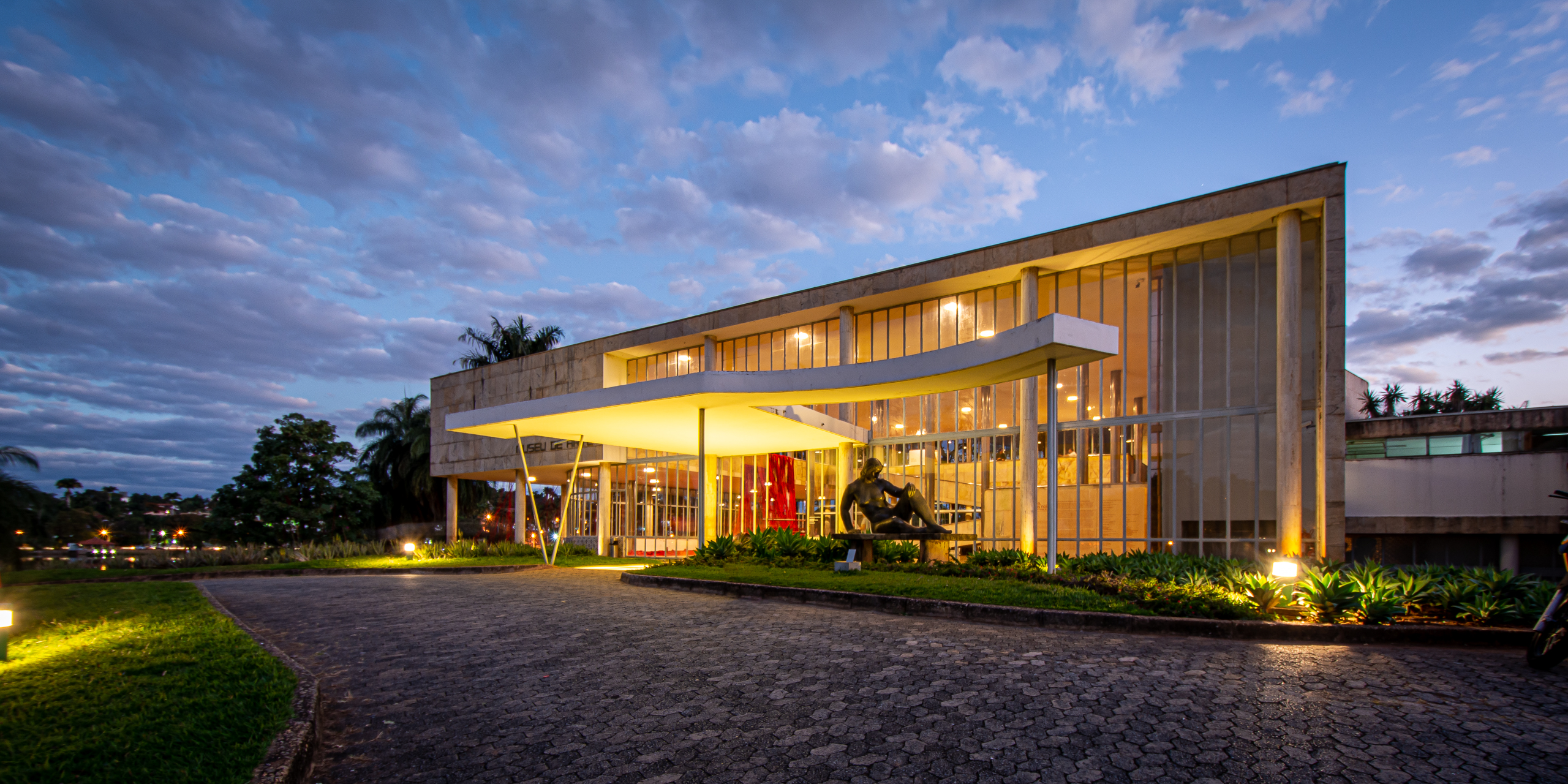
- Established: 1957
- Location: Belo Horizonte, Brazil
- Coordinates: 19°51′07″S 43°58′25″W
- Website: belohorizonte.mg.gov.br/local/atrativos-turisticos/culturais-lazer/museu-de-arte-da-pampulha
- Location of Pampulha Art Museum

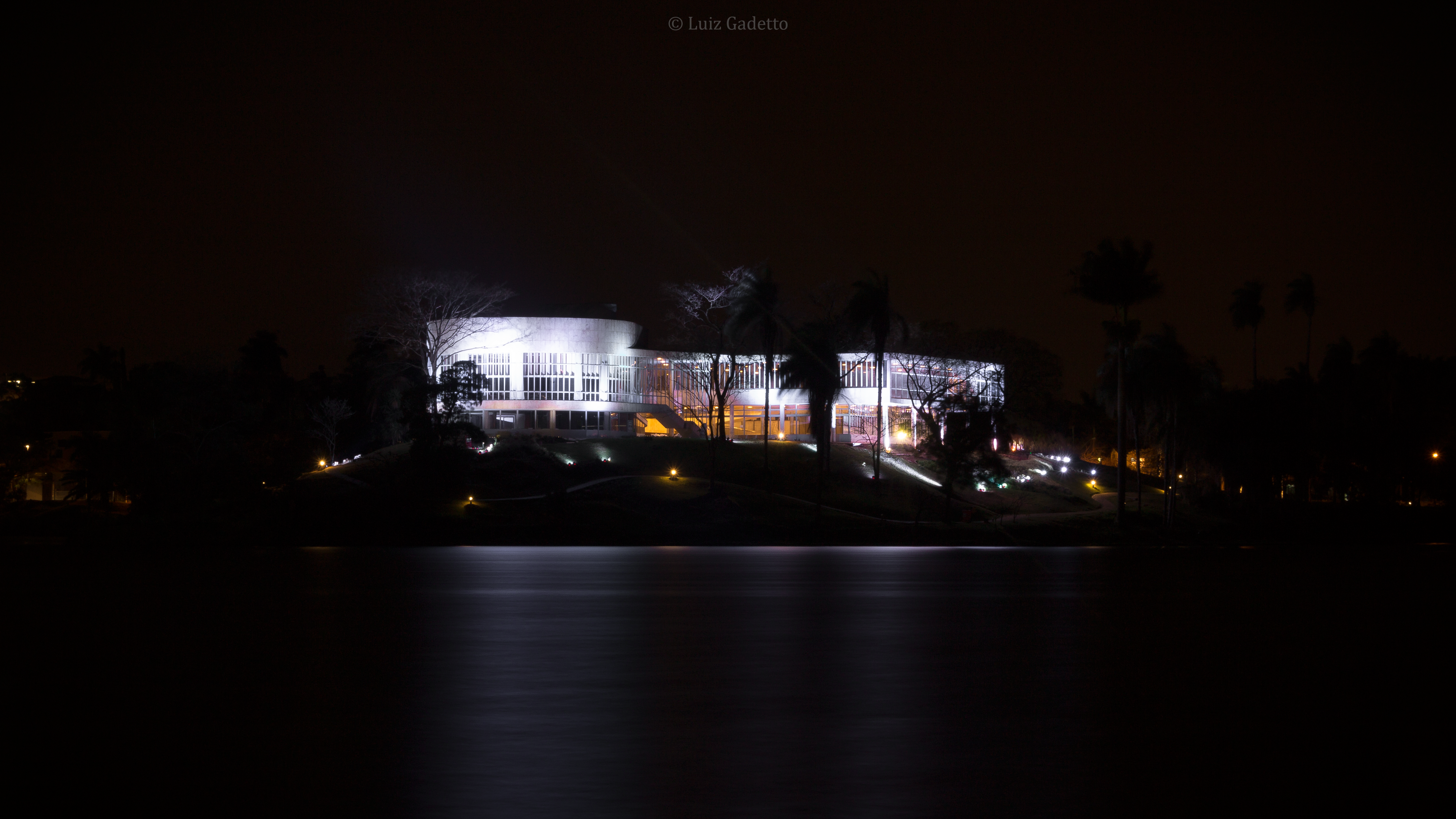
Museu de Arte da Pampulha (MAP) at night

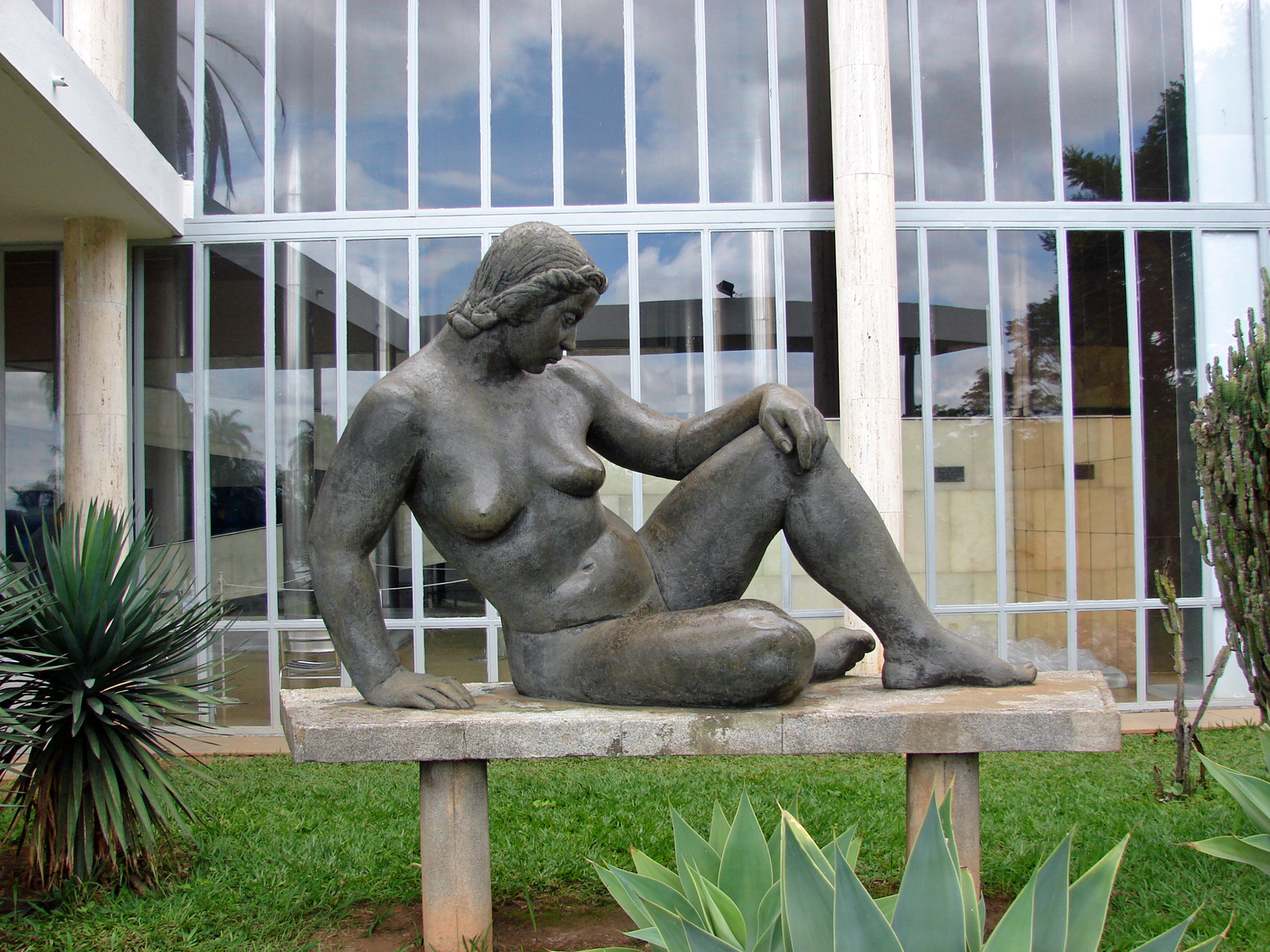
Nu, by August Zamoyski

The Pampulha Art Museum (Portuguese: Museu de Arte da Pampulha), formerly known as Cassino da Pampulha, is a building that is part of the Pampulha Modern Ensemble located in Belo Horizonte, Minas Gerais, Brazil. The building was designed by the architect Oscar Niemeyer at the request of the then-mayor of the city, Juscelino Kubitschek, and is recognized by UNESCO as a World Heritage Site along with the rest of the ensemble since 2016.

== Construction ==
It is one of the buildings designed by the architect Oscar Niemeyer, with structural calculation by the engineer Joaquim Cardoso, around the Lake Pampulha, in the Jardim Atlântico neighborhood in Belo Horizonte, Minas Gerais, Brazil, at the request of the then-mayor Juscelino Kubitschek in the early 1940s. The building is part of the Pampulha Modern Ensemble, which also includes the Church of Saint Francis of Assisi, the Casa do Baile, and the Iate Tênis Clube.

It was the first building of the complex to be built.

I did this project in one night, I had no other alternative. But when it operated as a casino, it fulfilled its purposes well, with its marbles, its stainless steel columns, and the bourgeoisie displaying themselves elegantly on its ramps.

— Oscar Niemeyer

As soon as it was inaugurated, the city's first casino began to attract players from all over Brazil, transforming the nightlife of Belo Horizonte. As the person in charge of the house was Joaquim Rolla, the same administrator of the casino in Urca, in Rio de Janeiro, and of the casino in the Quitandinha Palace, in Petrópolis, the casino brought some of the greatest international music show attractions to Belo Horizonte.

Burle Marx designed the external gardens, which are decorated with three sculptures (by Ceschiatti, Zamoyski and José Pedrosa). Since the renovation in 1996, its facilities have included a library, souvenir shop, café, and multimedia rooms.

== Conversion to museum ==
The glory days of Pampulha Casino were short-lived. On April 30, 1946, during the government of General Gaspar Dutra, gambling was prohibited throughout Brazil. The conversion of the casino into an art museum was proposed by the architects from Minas Gerais, Sylvio de Vasconcellos, who became its first director, and Celso Pinheiro, who was its chief conservator until 1965. The conversion was completed in 1957, when it was known as the "Crystal Palace".

== Collection ==
The MAP has a collection of 1,400 works, including exhibitions of Brazilian contemporary art, which focus on various artistic trends. One of the highlights of the collection are the works by Guignard. Its collection brings together works by various plastic artists such as Oswaldo Goeldi, Fayga Ostrower, and Anna Letycia, works by modernists such as Di Cavalcanti, Livio Abramo, Bruno Giorgi, and Ceschiatti, and by contemporary artists such as Antonio Dias, Frans Krajcberg, Ado Malagoli, Iberê Camargo, Tomie Ohtake, Ivan Serpa, Milton Dacosta, Alfredo Volpi, Franz Weissmann, among others.

== Bolsa Pampulha ==
Since 2003, the Pampulha Art Museum has hosted the Bolsa Pampulha (English: Pampulha Grant), a residency program regarded as one of the longest-running and most influential of its kind in Brazil. Initiated by curator Adriano Pedrosa during his tenure at the museum, the program offers stipends, studios, curatorial mentorship, and culminates in a group exhibition, with the possibility of works being incorporated into the museum's collection, subject to review by the institution's board. Over its two decades, Bolsa Pampulha has supported more than 100 artists, some of them who now experience international praise, including Cinthia Marcelle, Paulo Nazareth, Clara Ianni, Guerreiro do Divino Amor, Sallisa Rosa, Luana Vitra, and Wisrah C. V. da R. Celestino.

== Renovation ==
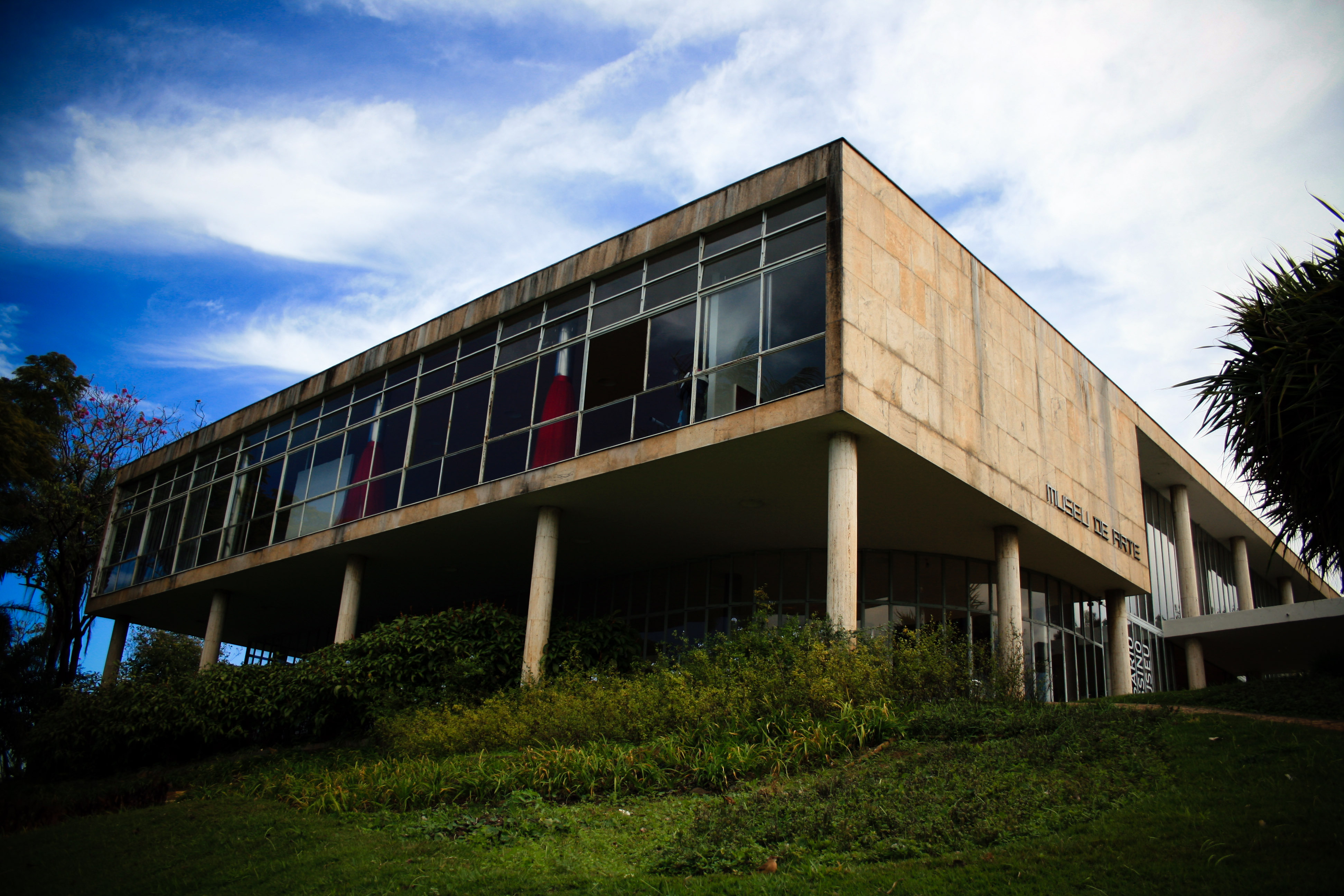
Lateral facade of the Pampulha Art Museum

In seven decades of operation, the museum has never undergone major renovations, even with infiltration problems that date back to the breaking of the Pampulha dam in 1955. In 2016, the Municipal Foundation of Culture announced that in July, the MAP would be closed to begin a major renovation throughout the building, initially expected to last two years with a projected cost of R$4.2 million. The proposed interventions need to be approved by the institutions managing protected heritage sites in the three spheres of government (municipal, state and federal); the first project was rejected and an updated version was approved in May 2023, with no set timeline of interventions and reopening.
