= Kubitschek Residence Museum =

Museu Casa Kubitschek
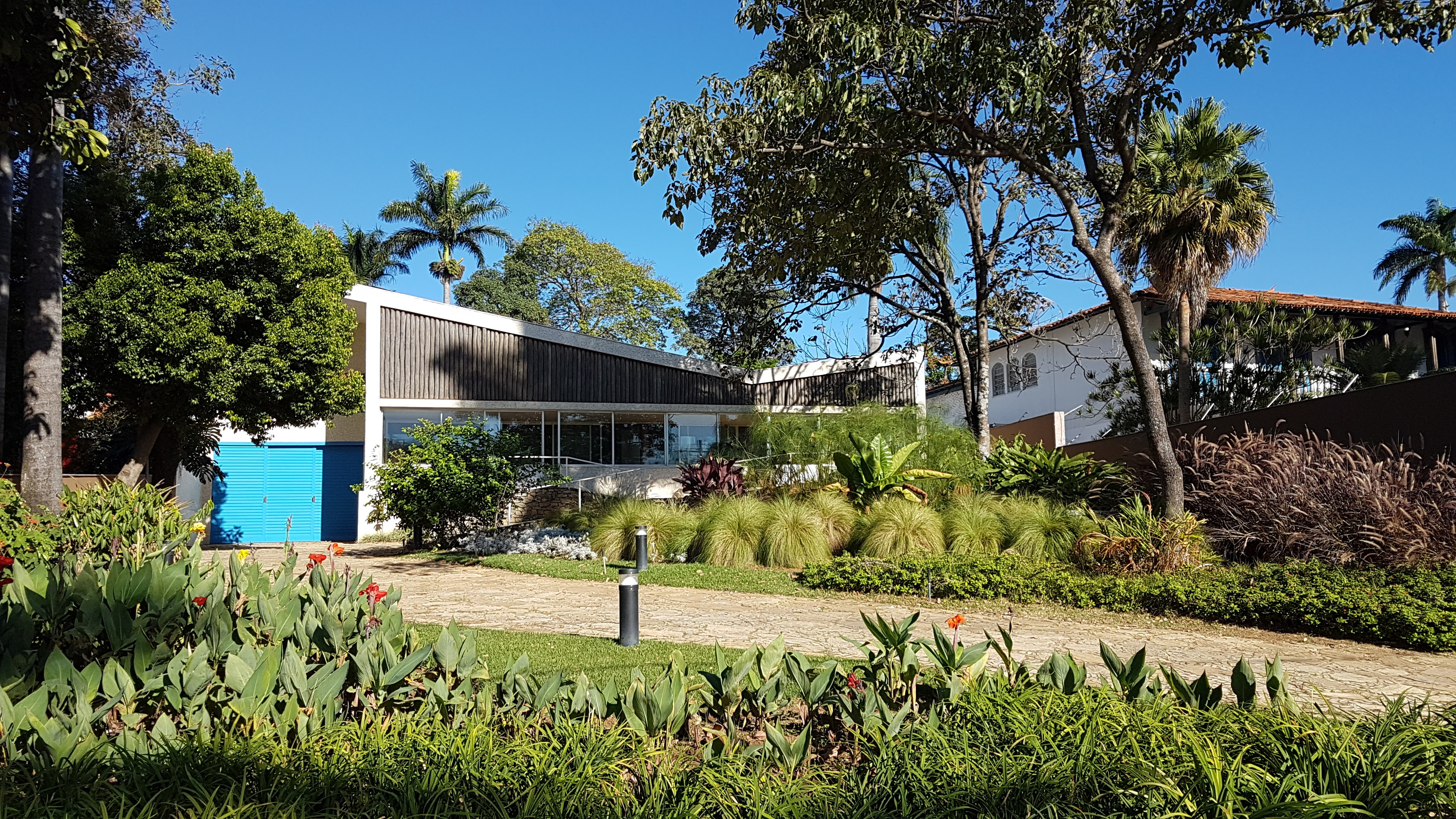
- Established: 2013
- Location: Brazil
- Coordinates: 19°51′18″S 43°58′50″W
- Website: www.belohorizonte.mg.gov.br/local/atrativo-turistico/artistico-cultural/arquitetura/casa-kubitschek
- Location of Kubitschek Residence Museum

The Kubitschek Residence Museum (Portuguese: Museu Casa Kubitschek) is a museum house located on the shore of Lake Pampulha in Belo Horizonte, Minas Gerais, Brazil. The building served as the weekend residence of Juscelino Kubitschek, prefect of Belo Horizonte at the time.

== History ==
=== Design ===
The house was designed by Oscar Niemeyer and built between 1940 and 1943. With a roof in the form of a butterfly with inclined planes, the Kubitschek Residence, which occupies 680 m^{2} of a plot measuring 2,800 m^{2}, is a characteristic example of Brazilian modernist architecture. The house was designed to preserve the intimacy and privacy of the Kubitschek family, an objective achieved by placing the structure at the farthest point from the street, adding a garden designed by Roberto Burle Marx at the entrance, and partitioning the residence's internal spaces.

In the interior of the house, the organization of the space and the decorative details, accentuated by paintings by Alfredo Volpi and murals by Paulo Werneck, reveal the features of the modernist architecture of Oscar Niemeyer and his contemporaries. Social spaces include living, dining, and game rooms; service spaces include the kitchen, a bathroom, and servants' quarters; and intimate areas included three bedrooms. A bathroom connected the master bedroom with to the pool area--sometimes pointed to by Kubitschek's enemies as an "emergency exit" for his alleged affairs.

At the back of the main structure, near the swimming pool, a smaller house was built, with 3 bedrooms, 2 living rooms, and a bathroom. Kubitschek used it as an office, and it was one of his favorite places; he would work and take calls while getting some sun by the pool.

=== Residence ===
The house remained occupied by the Kubitschek family until 1945, when Juscelino Kubitschek moved to Rio de Janeiro to assume his duties as a federal deputy. After his departure, the house remained unoccupied until 1956, when Kubitschek's friend, colleague, and best man--Joubert Guerra--bought the property. With this transaction, the Guerra family came to inhabit the house, which had been at Kubitschek's disposition whenever he visited Belo Horizonte.

Throughout Guerra's time at the residence, the property and the furniture within--mostly acquired by Juscelino Kubitschek himself--were well preserved. Among the furniture and appliances that were still in good condition were a refrigerator and a master bed purchased by Kubitschek, not to mention a French billiard table and 90 other items.

After Joubert Guerra's death in 1977, his wife, Juracy Brasilience Guerra, remained living at the residence until she died in 2004. With her death, the Prefecture of Belo Horizonte expressed interest in acquiring the house to transform it into a cultural space. In 2005, the heirs of the Guerra family signed an expropriation agreement ceding the property to the prefecture, which only in 2008 started reconstruction and renovation work for the establishment of the Kubitschek Residence Museum, based on the development plans of the Directory of Patrimony of the Municipal Culture Foundation of Belo Horizonte.

=== Museum ===
On September 10, 2013, the Municipal Prefecture of Belo Horizonte finally inaugurated the Kubitschek Residence Museum as a cultural space administered by the Municipal Culture Foundation. The space came to join the Pampulha Modern Ensemble, which also includes the Church of Saint Francis of Assisi, the Pampulha Museum of Art, and the Casa do Baile. Since its inauguration, the Kubitschek Residence Museum has been open for visits.

== See also ==
- Oscar Niemeyer
- Pampulha
