= Pampulha =

Pampulha may refer to:

- Pampulha (Belo Horizonte), a neighborhood of Belo Horizonte, Minas Gerais, Brazil in an administrative district of the same name
- Belo Horizonte/Pampulha – Carlos Drummond de Andrade Airport (also known as Pampulha Airport), an airport in the Pampulha neighborhood of Belo Horizonte
- Lake Pampulha, a lake in Belo Horizonte
- Pampulha Modern Ensemble, a UNESCO World Heritage Site
