= Municipal Salon of Fine Arts of Belo Horizonte =

Art salon in Brazil

- Salão Municipal de Belas Artes de Belo Horizonte

General information
- Status: Defunct
- Location: Belo Horizonte, Minas Gerais, Brazil
- Current tenants: Pampulha Art Museum (after 1957)
- Completed: 1937
- Opening: 1937
- Owner: Belo Horizonte City Hall
- Known for: Hosting the Municipal Salon of Fine Arts (SMBA-BH)

The Municipal Salon of Fine Arts of Belo Horizonte (SMBA-BH) or Capital Art Salon was an art salon established in 1937 that lasted throughout the 20th century under various names. National Salon of Contemporary Art and National Salon of Art of the Belo Horizonte City Hall are some of them.

== Importance ==
The Municipal Salons of Fine Arts of the Belo Horizonte City Hall – SMBA-BH – were important in consolidating art in the capital of Minas Gerais, being responsible for constituting a large part of the collection of the Pampulha Art Museum, the most representative institution of modern and contemporary art in Belo Horizonte.

Over the years, the Salon took on two forms. Until the 1970s, it was a traditional salon: artists submitted their works, which were then evaluated and awarded by a jury. With the advent of the 1970s, the salon took the form of a large collective exhibition, in which curators and critics worked together around a common thematic axis. The salon had renowned jurors such as Mário Pedrosa, Frederico Morais, Walter Zanini, Jayme Maurício, among others.

== History ==
In 1936, artists from Minas Gerais shocked their quiet capital with the controversial Salão do Bar Brasil. On that occasion, modernist painters, illustrators, and sculptors held an exhibition in a Bar in the basement of the Cine Brasil Building, located at Praça Sete. Among other things, their goal was to protest the lack of spaces designated for the artistic class in Belo Horizonte, especially those with a modernist slant. At the time, it's worth remembering, the Belo Horizonte environment was dominated by Aníbal Mattos and his academic and conservative artistic practices.

In 1937, the first City Hall Salon was created to meet the demands of the time. The initial committee included Aníbal Mattos, along with Jeanne Louise Milde and João Boutshauser. The idea was that the salon could be a place of reconciliation and fellowship and that it would serve both modern and academic artists

In 1938, the II Capital Art Salon featured Milde as a juror. The salon unfolded into a meeting of artists at the Petrópolis Farm, owned by her, located in Santa Luzia. The meeting was attended by artists Renato de Lima, Delpino Júnior, Delio Del Pino, Aurélia Rubião, Vicente Guimarães, Genesco Murta, Alfredo Bastos and Maria Aurélia Bastos, Bracher Altavilla, Baron von Smigay, and J. Carlos Lisboa. The goal was to create a large artistic movement that reconciled trends, but the project never took off. Aurélia Rubião was one of the few artists linked to the first group who came to relate to the modernists and incorporate their influence into her paintings.

In 1957, the Salon was transferred to the Pampulha Museum; in 1969, the cycle of municipal salons ended, and the National Salons of Contemporary Art began. In 1971, with the depletion caused by the dictatorship, the salon changed format, as mentioned at the beginning of the entry, and was renamed the National Salon of Art of the Belo Horizonte City Hall.
