= Fernando Lara =

Brazilian-American architect and academic

- Born: Fernando Luiz Lara; Brazil
- Education: Federal University of Minas Gerais; University of Michigan
- Occupations: Architect; Academic; Author
- Notable work: The Rise of Popular Modernist Architecture in Brazil (2008); Latitudes II (2014); Modern Architecture in Latin America: Art, Technology and Utopia (2015); Excepcionalidade do Modernismo Brasileiro (2018); Street Matters: A Critical History of Twentieth-Century Urban Policy in Brazil (2022)
- Website: www.fernandoluizlara.com

Fernando Luiz Lara is a Brazilian-born architect, academic, and author. He is a professor of Architecture at the Weitzman School of Design of the University of Pennsylvania.

== Biography and Career ==
Born in Brazil, Lara earned a Bachelor of Architecture from Federal University of Minas Gerais in 1993. He continued his education at Federal University of Minas Gerais and completed Master of Science in 1996. He completed his PhD from the University of Michigan in 2001.

Lara taught at the University of Michigan between 2004 and 2009. Between 2012 and 2015 he served as chair of the Brazil Center at the Lozano Long Institute of Latin American Studies at the University of Texas at Austin. He later served as director of the PhD Program in architecture at the same institution from 2018 to 2023. In 2017, Lara was a visiting professor at the University of São Paulo, Instituto de Estudos Brasileiros. In 2023, Lara joined the University of Pennsylvania as Professor of Architecture at the Stuart Weitzman School of Design.

He serves as editor of Latin America: Thoughts, a book series published by Romano Guerra Editora. He is also a member of the editorial boards of Platform Space, Revista Dearq (Universidad de los Andes), and Critical Productive.

== Scholarship ==
Lara’s scholarship focuses on architecture, urbanism, and the built environment of the Americas, drawing on decolonial approaches to spatial history and architectural theory. His publications include The Rise of Popular Modernist Architecture in Brazil (2008), Modern Architecture in Latin America (with Luis Carranza, 2015), Excepcionalidad del Modernismo Brasileño (2019), Street Matters: A Critical History of 20th Century Urban Policy in Brazil (with Ana Paula Koury, 2022), and Spatial Theories for the Americas (2024).

The Rise of Popular Modernist Architecture in Brazil was reviewed by Adrian Forty in the Journal of the Society of Architectural Historians. Modern Architecture in Latin America has been reviewed in several academic and professional journals, including the Hispanic American Historical Review, Bitácora and Architectural Record.

He has also edited several volumes, including Decolonizing the Spatial History of the Americas (2022) and Spatial Concepts for Decolonizing the Americas (with Felipe Hernandez, 2023).

== Artistic work ==
Lara is also an artist whose work has been exhibited at the São Paulo Biennale of Architecture, Naudain Art Collaborative, A-Space, the Philadelphia Sketch Club, and the Kubitschek Museum.

== Bibliography ==
=== Books written ===
- The Rise of Popular Modernist Architecture in Brazil (2008)
- Latitudes II (2014)
- Modern Architecture in Latin America: Art, Technology and Utopia, with Luis Carranza, (2015)
- Excepcionalidade do Modernismo Brasileiro (2018)
- Street Matters, A Critical History of Twentieth-Century Urban Policy in Brazil (2022)
- Spatial Theories for the Americas: Counterweights to Five Centuries of Eurocentrism (2024)

=== Books edited ===
- Latin America: Thoughs, Nhamerica Platform/Romano Guerra Editora
- Lelé: dialogues with neutra and prouvé
- Critical Readings
- Architecture and Nature by Abilio Guerra
- Ode to the Void by Carlos Teixeira
- Risky Spaces by Otávio Leonídio

=== Monographs ===
- Boldarini e Associados (2019)
- Arquitetos Associados (2017)
- Horizontes (2017)
