= Iate Tênis Clube =

Building in Pampulha, Belo Horizonte

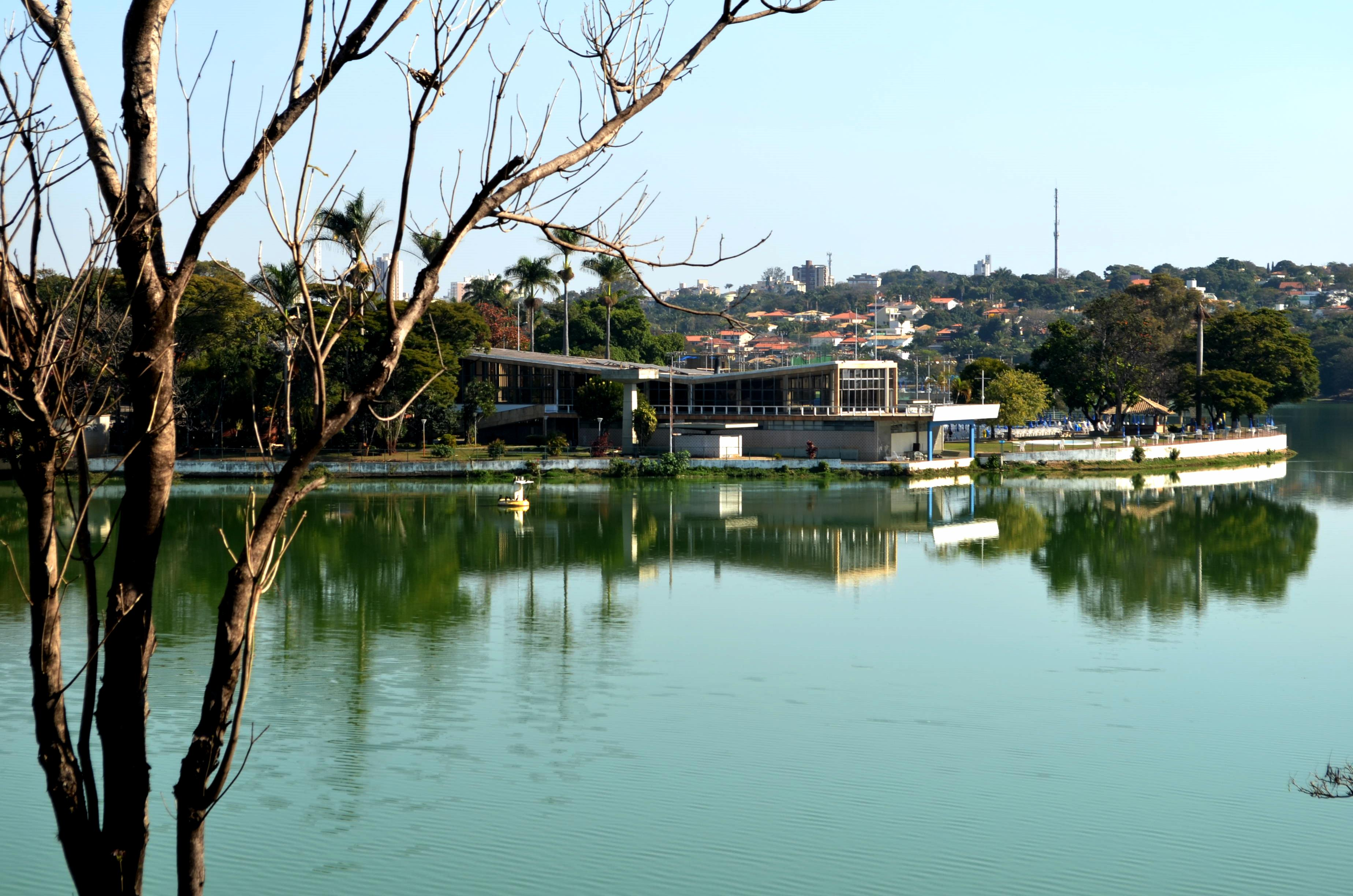
- Location: Pampulha, Belo Horizonte, Brazil

The Iate Tênis Clube (English: Yacht Tennis Club) is a recreational club located on the shore of the Lake Pampulha in Belo Horizonte. Its building was designed by architect Oscar Niemeyer in the early 1940s, integrating the Pampulha Architectural Complex, recognized by UNESCO as a World Heritage Site since 2016.

== Creation ==
Iate Tênis Clube, initially called "Iate Golfe Clube" (Yacht Golf Club), is one of the four buildings designed by Oscar Niemeyer commissioned by Juscelino Kubitschek, then mayor of the capital of Minas Gerais, in the early 1940s, when the dam that formed Pampulha Lake was created. It is a recreational club still in operation.

The architectural highlight of the club is a building that has, on the upper level, the Portinari Room, named after Candido Portinari, author of one of the murals painted on the site. The ground level of the building is a shelter for boats. The club's outdoor areas have gardens that were designed by Brazilian landscape architect Roberto Burle Marx.

In the 1970s, the club built an annex with a party hall and gym. The project was not designed by Oscar Niemeyer, the original architect of the complex, and has a style that differs from the rest of the complex.

== World Heritage Site ==
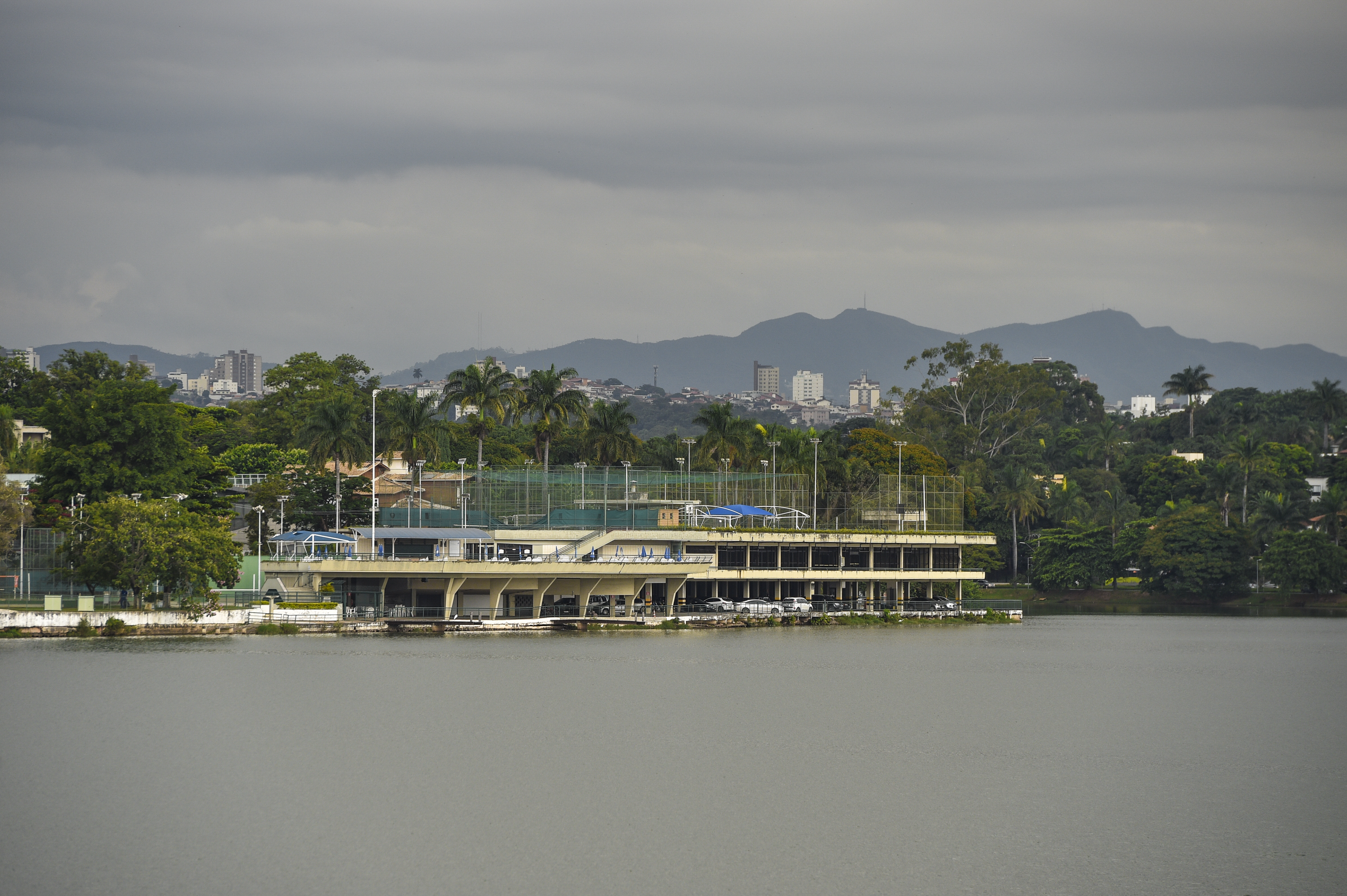
Annex of Iate Tênis Clube, built on invaded land belonging to the City Hall of Belo Horizonte.

In 2016, the Architectural Ensemble of Pampulha was declared a World Heritage Site by the United Nations Educational, Scientific and Cultural Organization (UNESCO). The original part of the club is part of the complex, but UNESCO has made reservations regarding the existence of the annex, which was irregularly built on part of the City of Belo Horizonte's property that was invaded by the club. Because it obstructed the view of the club from the Igreja da Pampulha (Church of Saint Francis of Assisi), compromising the visual relationship between the buildings of the architectural ensemble, its demolition with landscape reconstitution was a condition given by UNESCO for the declaration of World Heritage Site.

The City of Belo Horizonte opened a request for repossession of the invaded area for the demolition of the annex and landscape restoration of the area, as requested by UNESCO, in 2019, and awaits a judicial decision.
