= Casa do Baile =

Architectural landmark in Belo Horizonte, Brazil

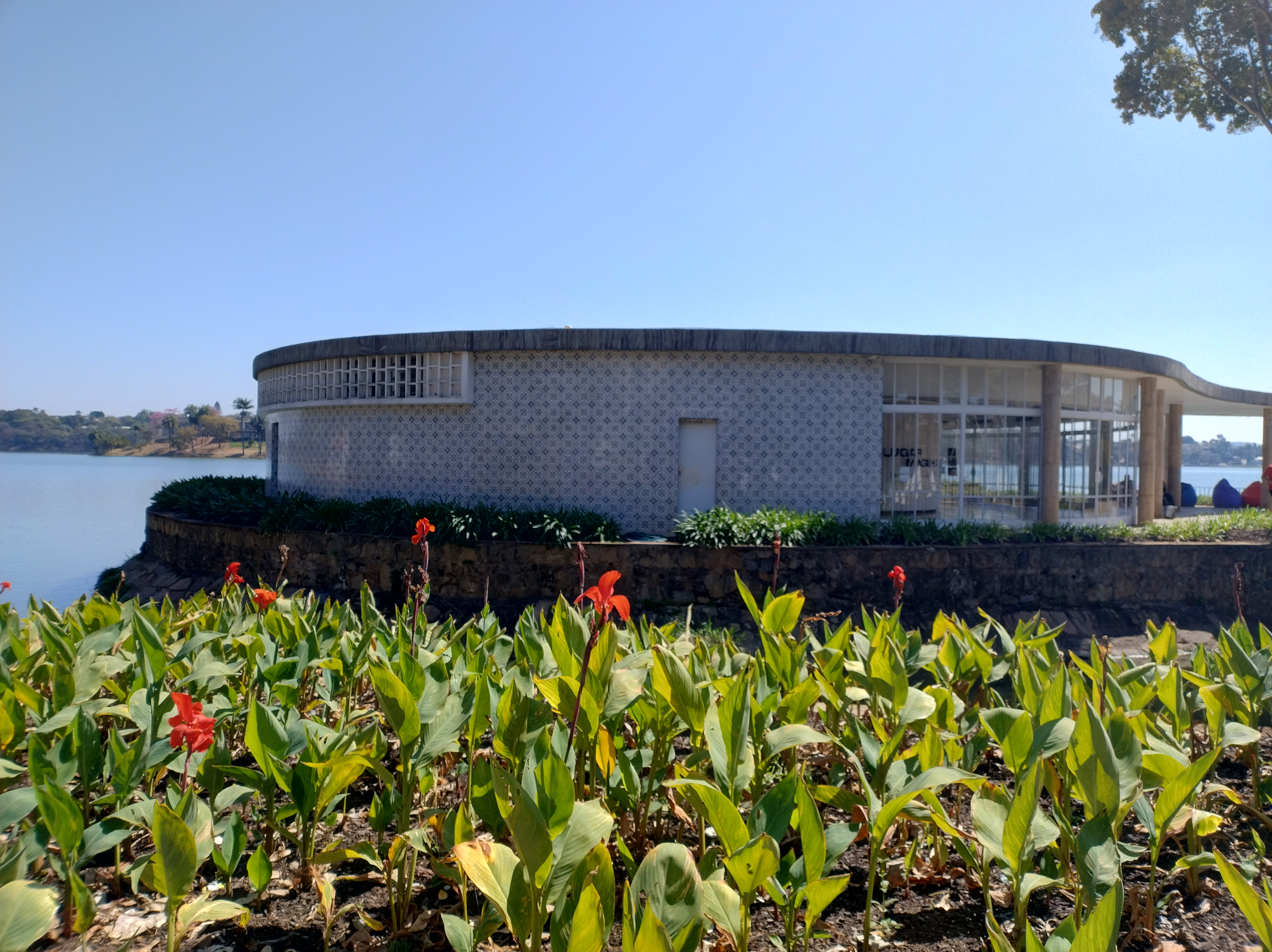
- Established: 1943
- Location: Brazil
- Coordinates: 19°51′16″S 43°58′12″W
- Location of Casa do Baile

The Casa do Baile (English: "Ball House") is an architectural landmark in Belo Horizonte, Brazil, designed by Brazilian architect Oscar Niemeyer. It is part of the Pampulha Modern Ensemble, a complex of buildings constructed around Lake Pampulha in the 1940s that represents some of Niemeyer's earliest works in his distinctive modernist style utilizing curved forms. The Casa do Baile was inaugurated in 1943 as a restaurant and dance hall for popular entertainment, though it had a short lifespan in that role. After years of alternate uses, it reopened in 2002 as an architecture and design center. Its fluid curves integrating with the natural landscape have made it an icon of modern Brazilian architecture, garnering protected status at municipal, state and national levels.

== Construction ==
The Casa do Baile was one of several buildings commissioned by Juscelino Kubitschek, the then-mayor of Belo Horizonte, to establish the Pampulha lake district as a leisure area for the city. Kubitschek hired Niemeyer, already gaining notoriety as a young architect, to design the project's buildings in 1942. Though influenced by the modernist principles of Le Corbusier, Niemeyer brought his own sensibilities, taking advantage of the flexibility of reinforced concrete to create sweeping curves and sinuous forms.

The Casa do Baile is situated on an artificial island in Lake Pampulha, connected to the shore by a concrete bridge. Its layout consists of two intersecting circles, one housing the main hall and another the rear service area. From this base extends the building's most iconic feature, an undulating concrete canopy supported by columns that shades an outdoor promenade, terminating in a small amoeba-shaped volume faced with decorative tiles. The canopy's expressive shapes have drawn comparisons to the Baroque style, complementing the lake's natural curves. The structural design was by engineer Albino Froufe. The surrounding landscape was conceived by landscape architect Roberto Burle Marx, who collaborated with Niemeyer in several other projects, to integrate the building with its lakefront site.

== Usage ==
The Casa do Baile opened in 1943 as a restaurant and dance hall, part of Pampulha's new identity as a center for popular entertainment. Its club-like atmosphere and lake views attracted Belo Horizonte's upper classes, and the adjacent cassino brought further traffic. The venue's brief lifespan in this role ended after only a few years when gambling was prohibited nationwide in 1946, causing the cassino's closure, which now functions as an Art Museum. Deprived of this complementary attraction, the Casa do Baile soon ceased operations as a restaurant and event space.

== Heritage status ==
Though functionality was disrupted, the Casa do Baile's continued to receive attention for its architectural merits. It is renowned as an early example of Niemeyer's mastery of curvilinear forms, described by him as the project where he felt freest in exploring curves. The building has been recognized at all Brazilian government levels (municipal, state and federal) for its cultural heritage value. It was designated as a protected landmark by the city of Belo Horizonte in 2003, the state of Minas Gerais in 1984, and the nation of Brazil in 1997.

Most significantly, in 2016 it became part of the Pampulha Modern Ensemble World Heritage Site designated by UNESCO. This required certain interventions to restore the building's original form, such as demolishing an entrance booth added after the original construction. Ongoing preservation has included renovating the building, revitalizing its landscaping, and reopening it in 2002 as a center for architecture, urbanism and design. The Casa do Baile now hosts exhibitions, events and educational programming related to its architectural focus.

== Gallery ==
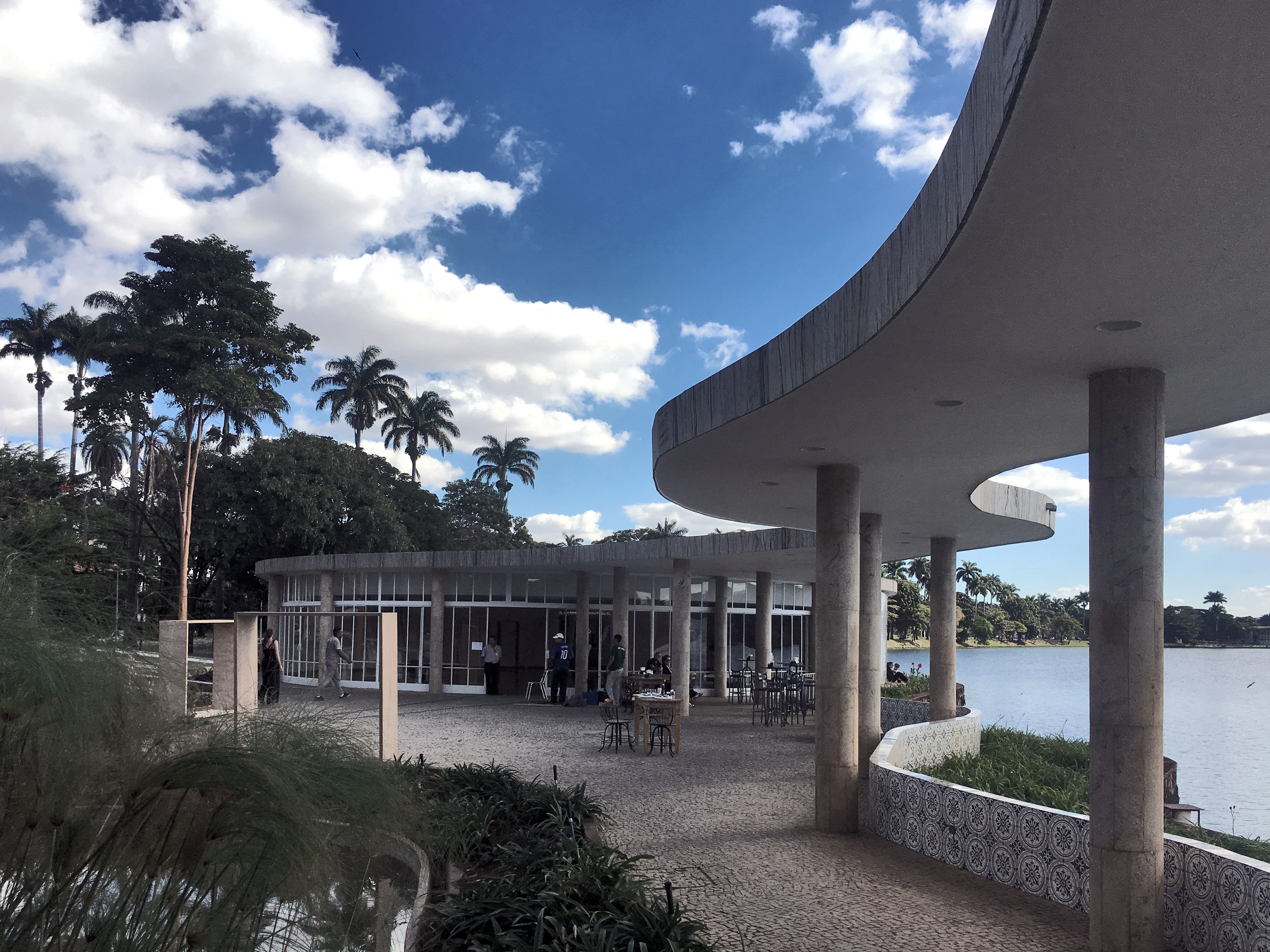
The building's sinuous concrete canopy

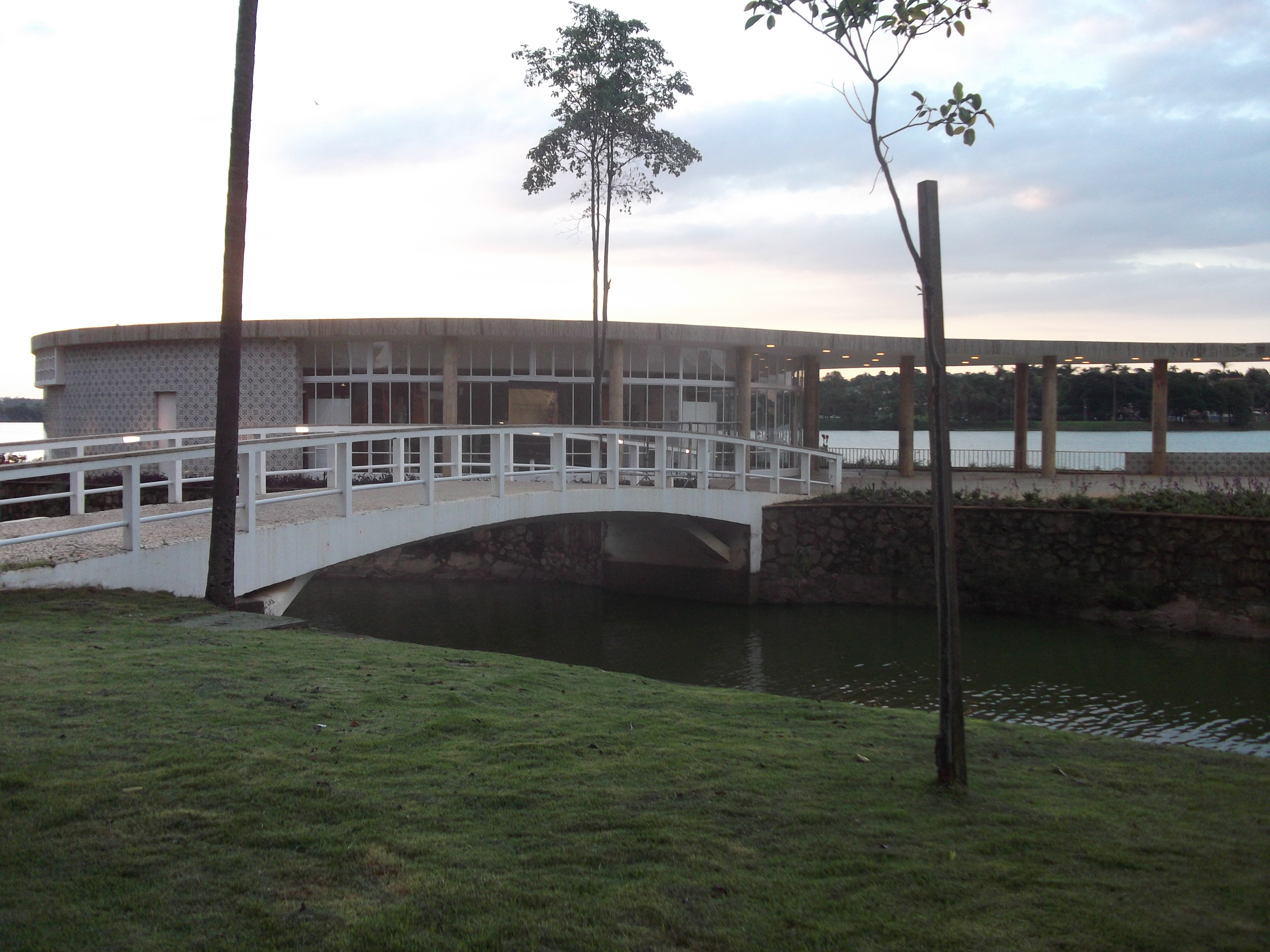
The concrete bridge that serves as the entrance of the building

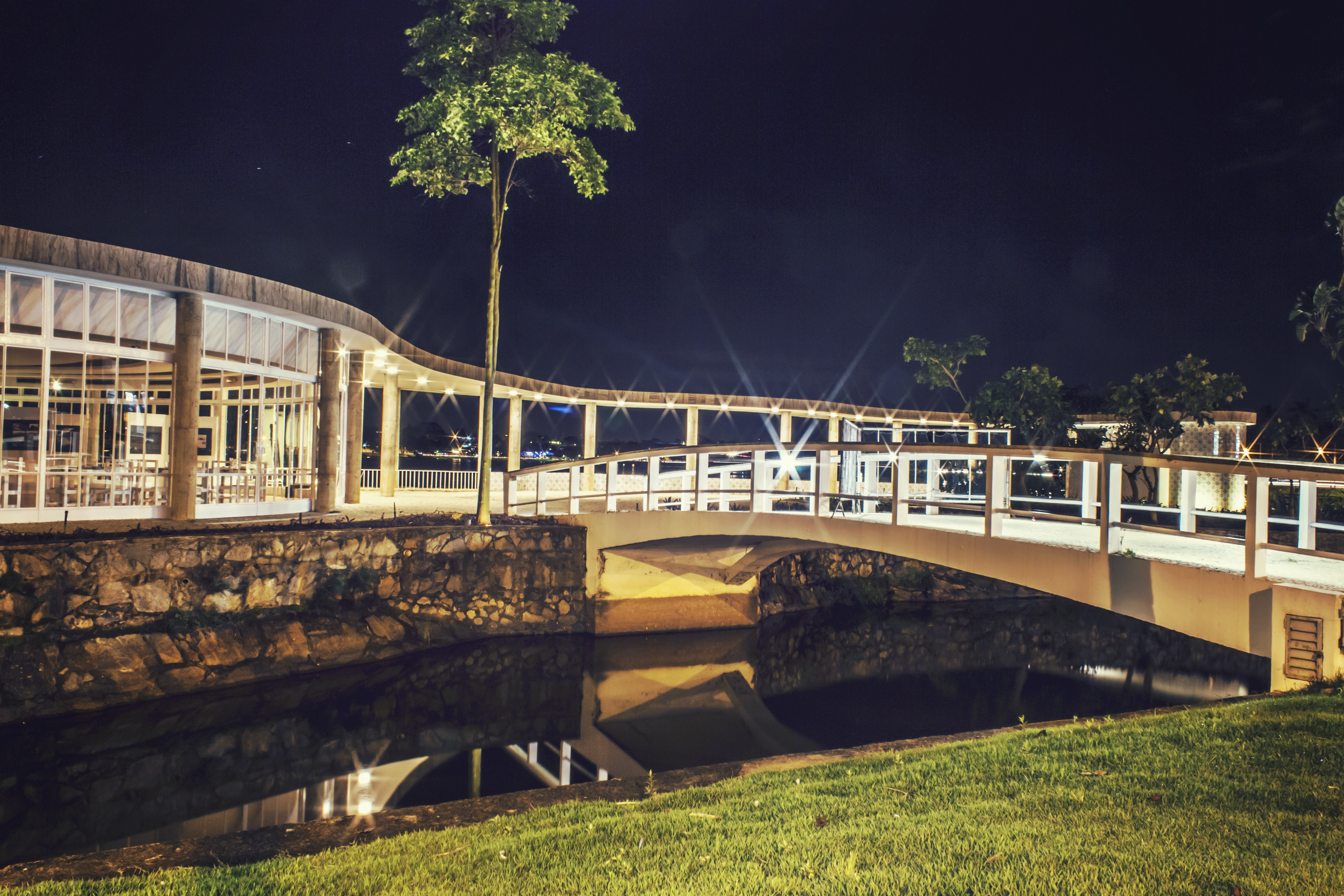
An exterior view of the Casa do Baile at night
