= Alfredo Ceschiatti =

Brazilian sculptor

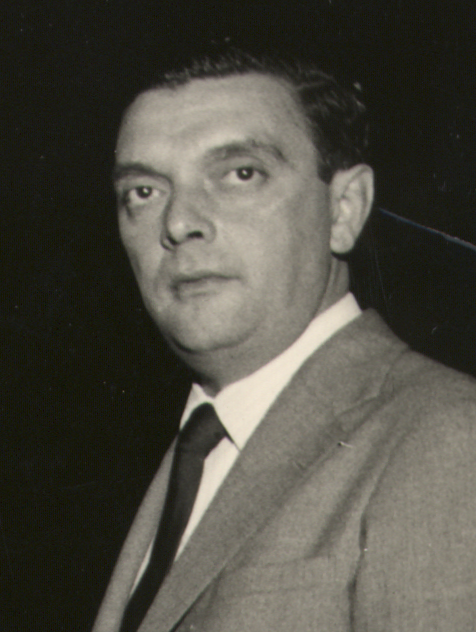
- Alfredo Ceschiatti, 1956.
- Born: September 1, 1918; Belo Horizonte, Minas Gerais, Brazil
- Died: August 25, 1989 (aged 70); Rio de Janeiro, Rio de Janeiro, Brazil
- Occupation: sculptor

Alfredo Ceschiatti (September 1, 1918 – August 25, 1989) was a Brazilian sculptor.

== Life and career ==
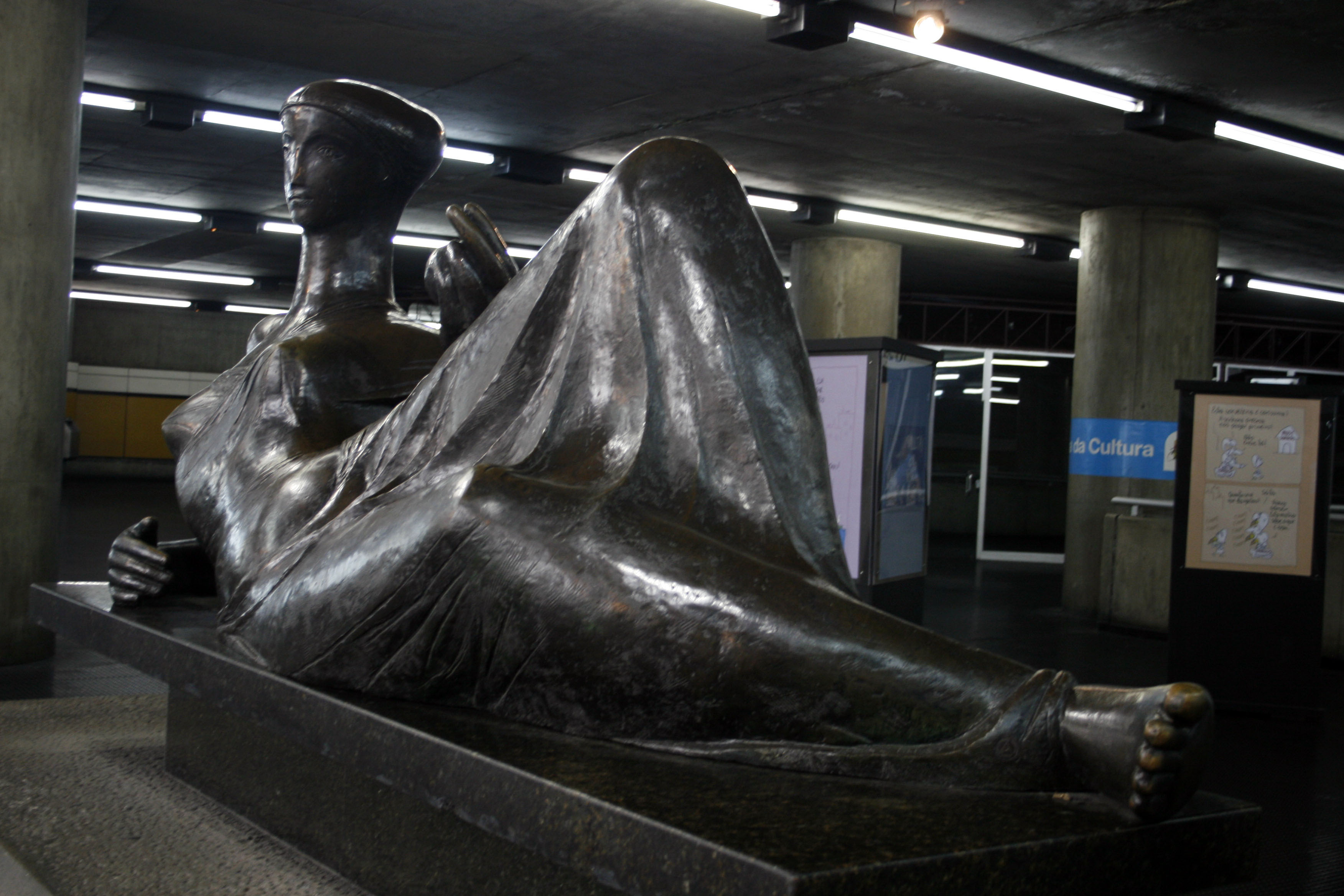
Untitled(1978), sculpture located at São Paulo Metro Sé station.

Ceschiatti was born in Belo Horizonte in 1918 to Italian parents. He went to Italy in 1937, benefited by the Italian government in promoting trips by the children of immigrants to the country. Back to Brazil, he settled in Rio de Janeiro where he studied at the National School of Fine Arts. He was awarded at the National Salon of Fine Arts, in 1945, for the bas-relief of the baptistery of the Church of Saint Francis of Assisi, in Belo Horizonte. He met Oscar Niemeyer, who commissioned him a sculpture for the Architectural Ensemble of Pampulha, in Belo Horizonte. Ceschiatti created O Abraço, a sculpture depicting two embraced women. The citizens of Belo Horizonte considered immoral, it was kept for many years until it was finally exposed in a garden in Pampulha. The sculpture Duas Amigas was made for the Salão Nobre (upper garden) of the Itamaraty Palace with guidance from Ambassador Wladimir Murtinho, who served as chief curator in the Palace's ambience project. The artist's taste for the female figure is present in several of his works.

In 1960 he sculpted, in granite, As três forças armadas, one of the themes in the Monument to the Dead of World War II, in Rio de Janeiro. His works are in exhibition in several Brazilian museums.

In a new partnership with Niemeyer, he became the main sculptor of the country's new capital Brasília, including:

- As Iaras, in bronze, at the Palácio da Alvorada's reflecting pool;
- Leda e o Cisne, bronze, at Palácio do Jaburu's courtyard;
- A Justiça, in granite, in front of the Supreme Federal Court building;
- Os Anjos and Os Evangelistas, in the Metropolitan Cathedral of Brasília;
- As gêmeas, in bronze, at the Itamaraty Palace;
- Anjo, in golden bronze at the Chamber of Deputies;
- A Contorcionista, in the Sala Villa Lobos foyer, Cláudio Santoro National Theater
- Deusa Athena, at the University of Brasília's Central Library;

He was part of the National Commission of Fine Arts and professor of sculpture and drawing at the University of Brasília. He then resigned in solidarity with colleagues persecuted for political reasons. He complained, decades later, about the way Brasília treated his works.

== Gallery ==
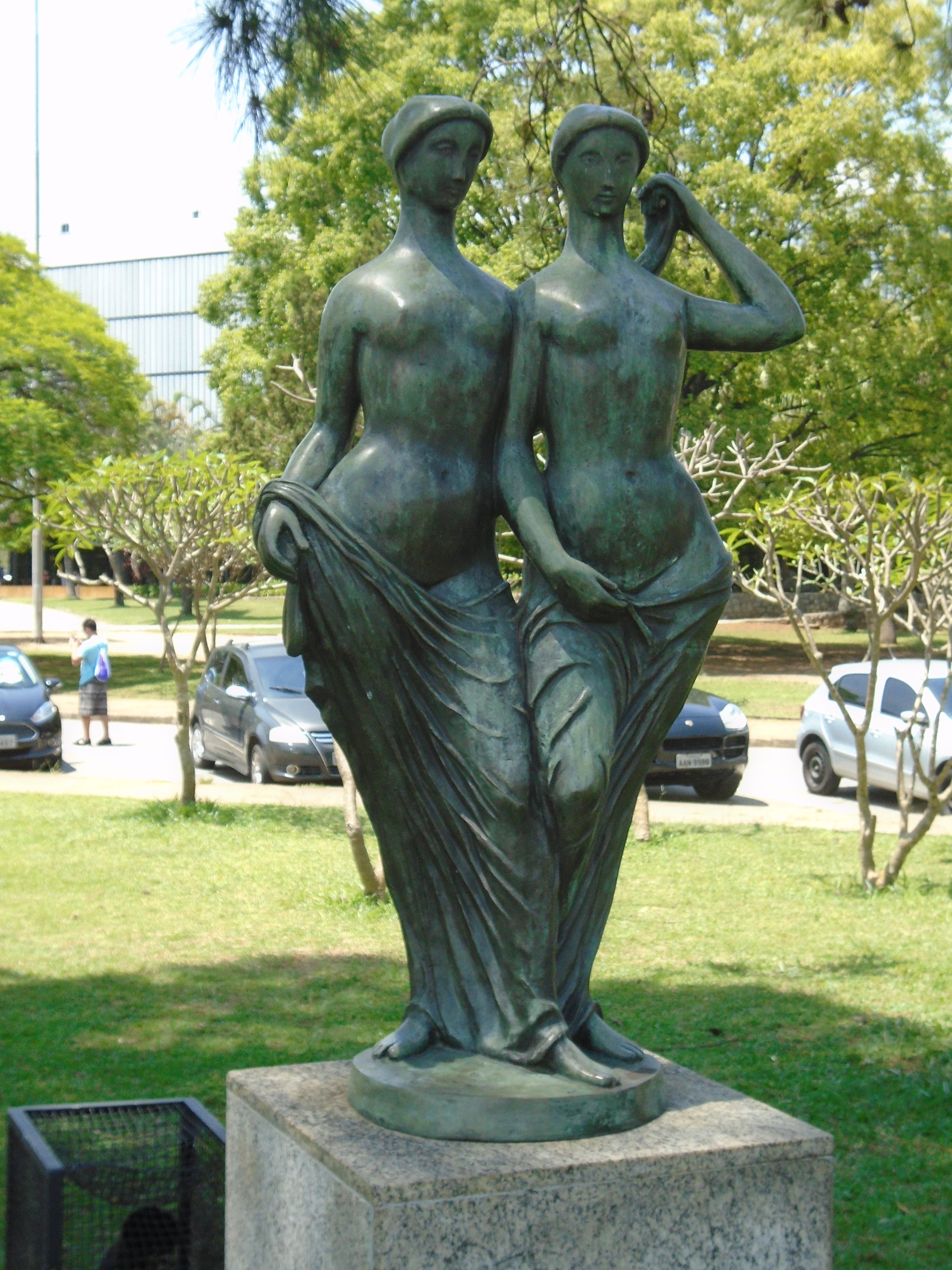
As Irmãs (The Sisters), 1966.

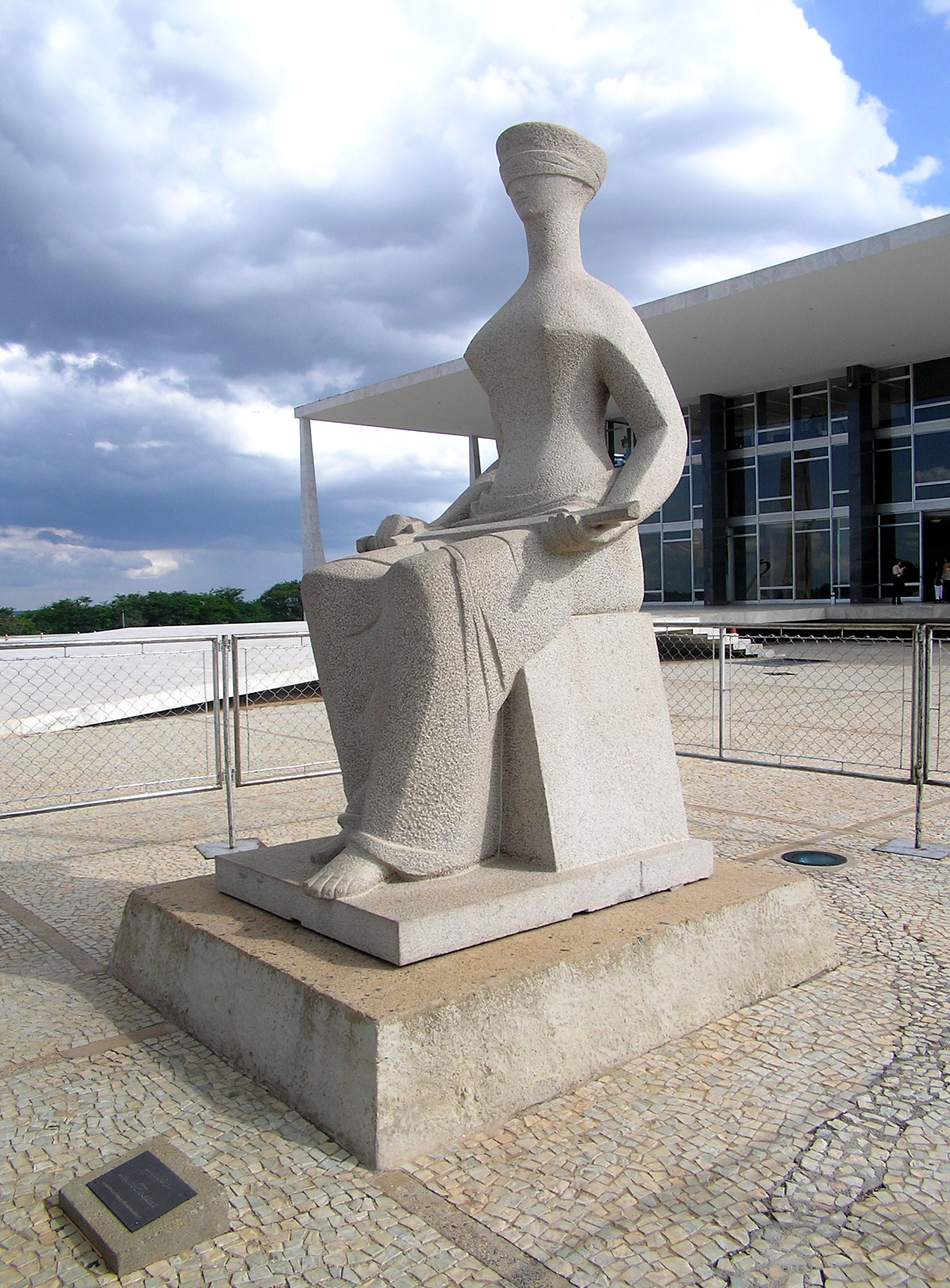
A Justiça (The Justice), in front of the Supreme Federal Court building.

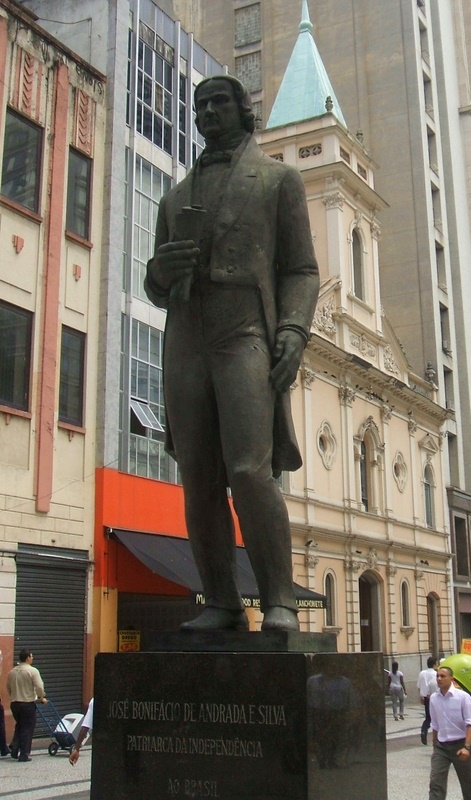
Monument to José Bonifácio, at Patriarca Square, São Paulo.

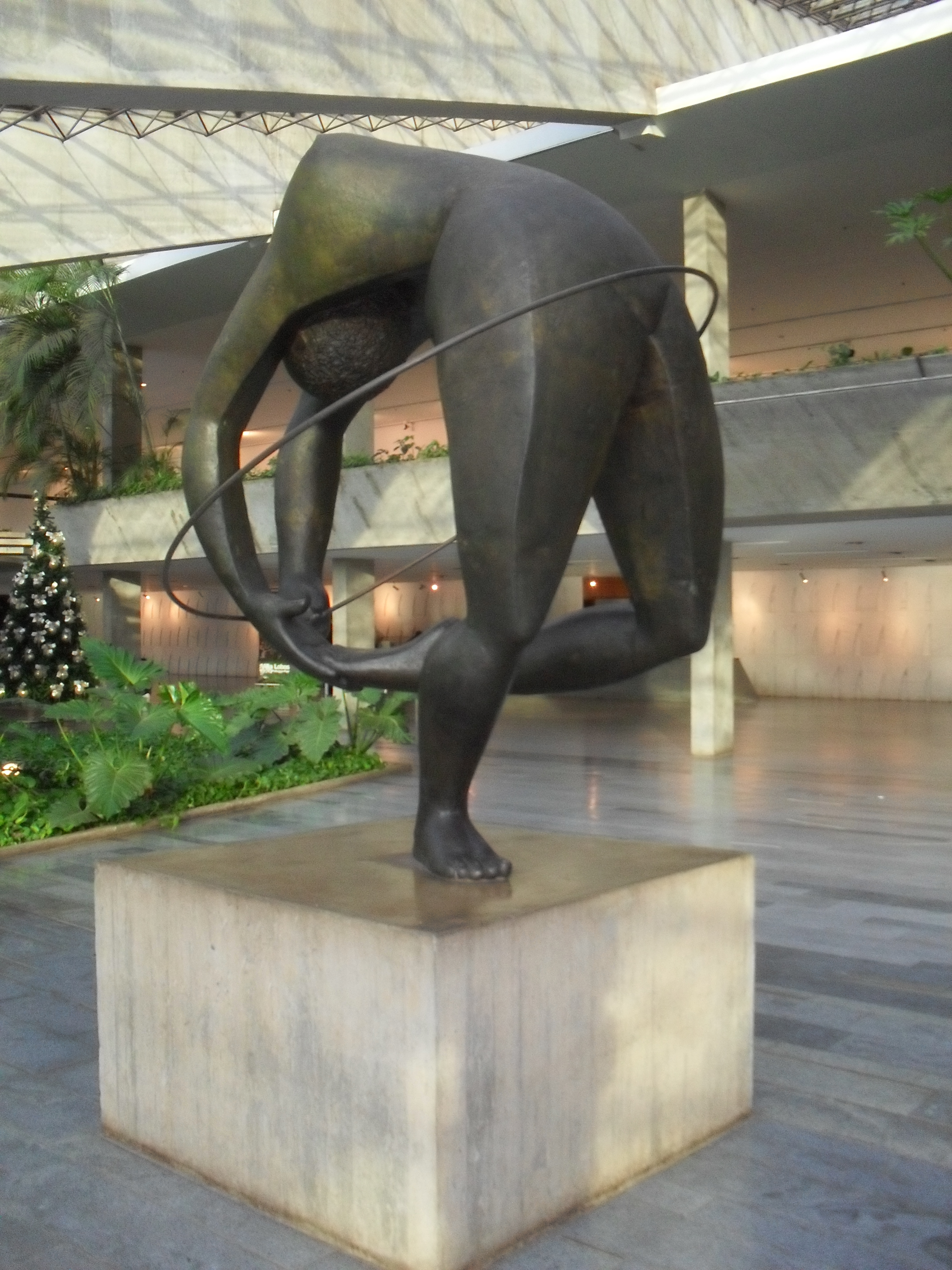
A Contorcionista (The contortionist)
