= Sylvio de Vasconcellos =

Brazilian architect

Sylvio Carvalho de Vasconcellos
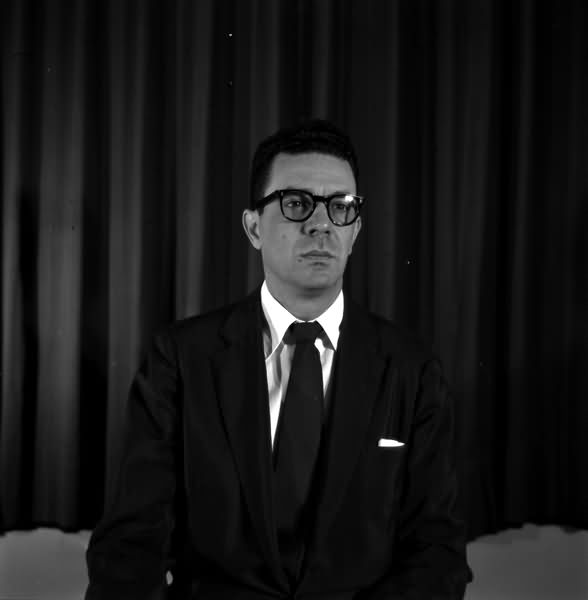
- Born: 14 October 1916; Belo Horizonte, MG, Brazil
- Died: 14 March 1979 (age 62); Washington, D.C., U.S.
- Education: Escola de Arquitetura da Universidade Federal de Minas Gerais
- Occupation: Architect
- Buildings: Edifício Mape; Capela Verda Farrar; DCE da UFMG; ICBEU

Sylvio Carvalho de Vasconcellos (October 14, 1916 in Belo Horizonte, MG, Brazil ‒ March 14, 1979 in Washington, DC) was a Brazilian architect and architectural historian, also recognized as one of the pioneers of Brazilian modernist architecture in the state of Minas Gerais.

His many studies, articles, and other scholarly works, some of them translated into other languages, spanned a range of topics that included the Baroque period in Minas, formation of the first settlements in the region, and modern architecture. He was also a long-time columnist and contributor to the Belo Horizonte newspaper, O Estado de Minas.

The son of a traditional Minas Gerais family, Sylvio was the fifth of seven children born to historian Salomão de Vasconcellos (1877–1965) and Branca Teresa Carvalho de Vasconcellos (1886–1972), a musician. His forebears included Diogo Pereira Ribeiro de Vasconcellos (1758–1815), Bernardo Pereira de Vasconcellos (1795–1850), and Diogo de Vasconcellos (1843–1927).

== Academic and institutional career ==
Sylvio was District III Director of Brazil's Institute of National Historic and Artistic Heritage from 1939 until 1969 and Chair Professor of Brazilian Architecture and Dean of the School of Architecture at the Federal University of Minas Gerais in Belo Horizonte. Among other positions, he was also President of the Minas Gerais Section of the Brazilian Institute of Architects, member of the council and curatorship of the São Paulo Museum of Art, member and Director of the Minas Gerais Association of Writers, and Director of the Brazil-U.S. Cultural Institute (ICBEU) in Belo Horizonte.

After gambling was outlawed in Brazil in 1946, Sylvio conceived the idea and oversaw conversion of the Casino designed by Oscar Niemeyer at the Pampulha Modern Ensemble in Belo Horizonte into the Pampulha Museum of Art.. The undertaking began in 1952 and culminated in its inauguration in 1957. He also served as the Museum's first Director.

His publications include numerous studies on architecture, with special emphasis on colonial architecture in Brazil and Minas Gerais in particular. He is especially known for the following contributions: Vila Rica: formação e desenvolvimento (an exhaustive study of development of the colonial city of Ouro Preto, based on his thesis defended in 1951 for one of four national chair professorships in Brazilian Architecture); Arquitetura no Brasil: Sistemas Construtivos (1958); Mineiridade: Ensaio de Caracterização [Mineiridade: An Essay on the Culture of Minas Gerais] (1968), for which he was awarded the First Prize for a Scholarly Work on Minas Gerais in 1969; and Vida e obra de Antônio Francisco Lisboa, O Aleijadinho, a study of the colonial sculptor often referred to as “the Little Cripple” in which he offered new context, extensive analysis, and a comprehensive catalog of the subject's work.

In 1959, Sylvio established the Advisory Nucleus for Research in Architecture and Urban Planning at the UFMG School of Architecture. More than 70 books were published under this program until it was closed down by the military government in 1964.

He was elected Dean of the School of Architecture, UFMG, in 1963, but forcibly removed from the position at the start of the 1964 military coup in Brazil. However, his career did not end there. In 1965, he embarked on a self-imposed exile, during which he continued to make professional and scholarly contributions.

In France, Sylvio worked on planning the industrial city of Dreux as part of a program for the decentralization of Paris. In Portugal, he pursued research as a fellow at the Gulbenkian Foundation. In Santiago, Chile, he headed the Urban Unit at the Latin American Center for Economic and Development (DESAL) and also taught architectural composition and theory at the University of Chile, Returning to Brazil in 1968, he taught theory of architecture at the University of Brasília and then briefly resumed his activities with IPHAN and the UFMG School of Architecture until the military government ordered his retirement in December 1969

In 1970, he won a Guggenheim Fellowship, which allowed him to carry on his research in a country of his choice. At the end of 1970, he started working for the Organization of American States (OAS) in its Division of Urban Development. During 1971–1973, he was the Division's Regional Director for Mexico, Central America, and the Caribbean, headquartered in Mexico City. Following his tenure in Mexico, he became a staff specialist in the Division at OAS headquarters in Washington, D.C. His last assignment with the Organization ended in 1977.

Throughout his post-Brazil years, Sylvio continued to publish scholarly articles, wrote hundreds of articles for the Estado de Minas, won a grant from the U.S. National Endowment for the Humanities to translate and annotate a collection of colonial documents on the settlement of Minas Gerais in the seventeenth century, and authored his exhaustive analysis of the work of Antônio Francisco Lisboa.

== Architectural projects ==
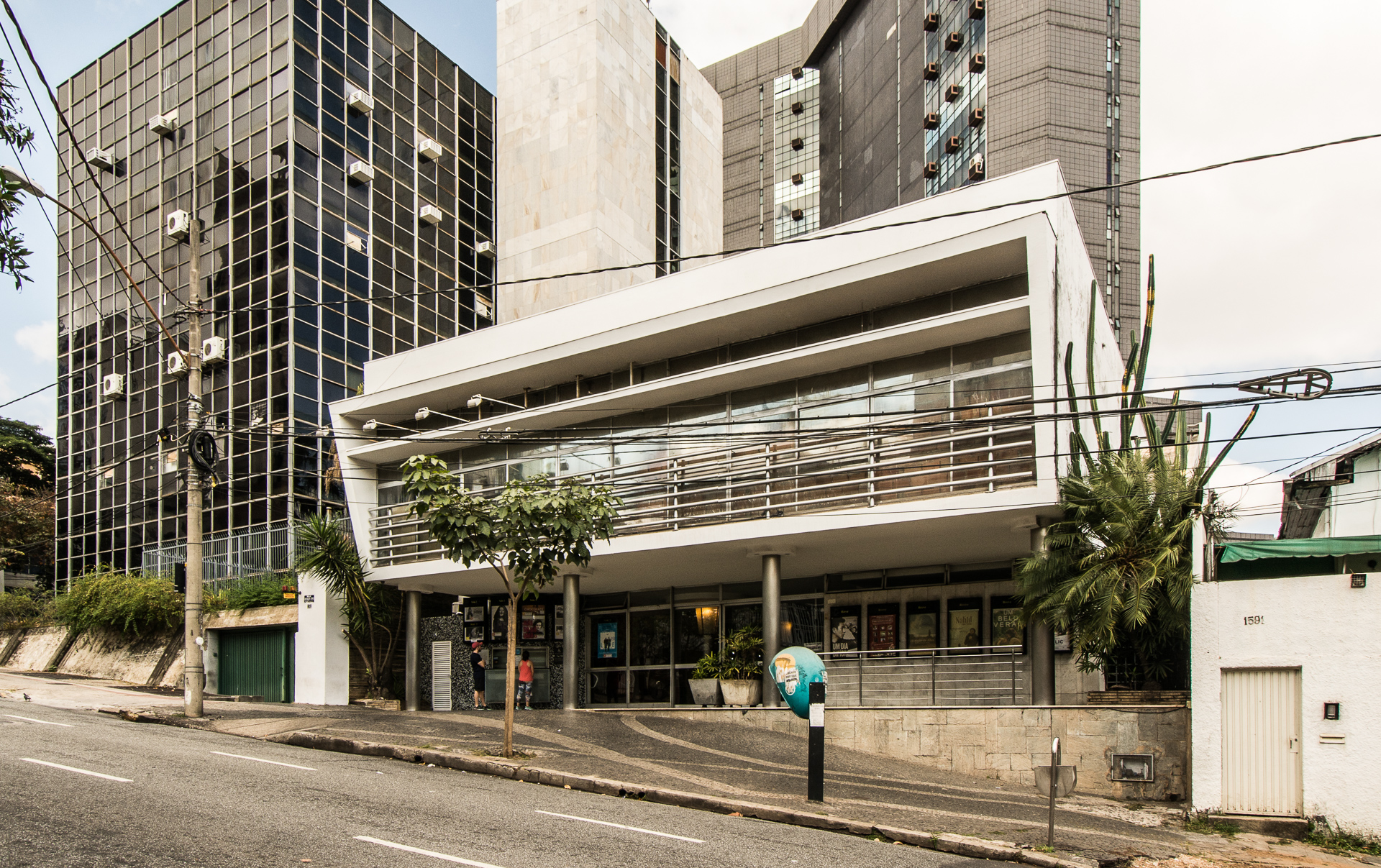
Project on Rua Gonçalves Dias in Belo Horizonte. Built in 1953 as headquarters for the UFMG Student Union, it currently houses an art film center.

Sylvio designed a number of modernist buildings in the city of Belo Horizonte, including the Mape Building, a condominium project on Praça da Liberdade; the headquarters of ICBEU; the chapel of the Izabela Hendrix Methodist Institute on Rua da Bahia; and the UFMG Student Union building, now an art film theater, on Rua Guajajaras. He also designed dozens of private residences, mainly in the Cidade Jardim and Serra neighborhoods. Some of these homes have been designated cultural heritage sites by the Belo Horizonte City Government.

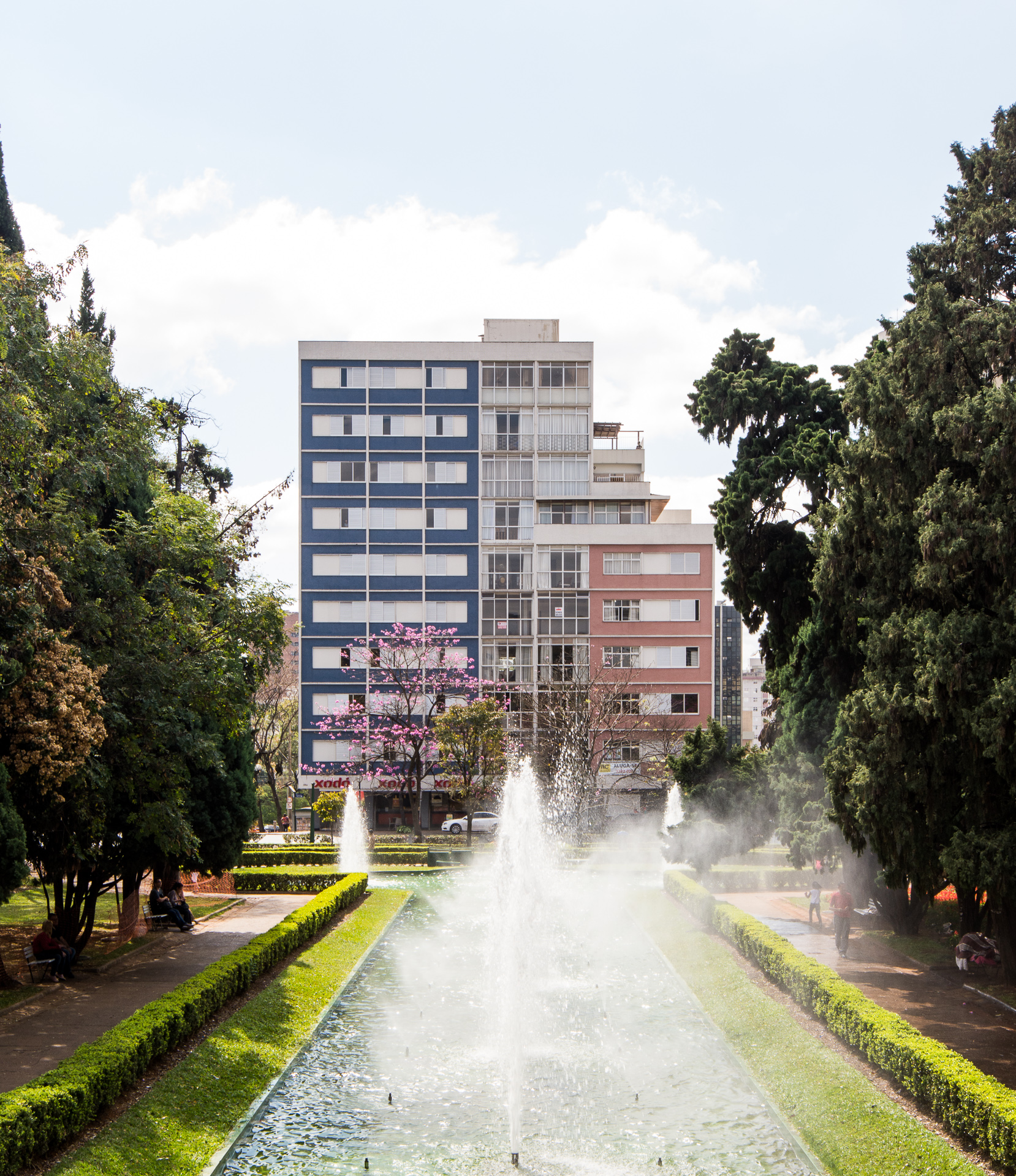
Mape Building on the Praça da Liberdade Belo Horizonte. Completed in 1958.

== Imprisonment, legal charges, and exile ==
Sylvio was taken prisoner with no formal charges on March 31, 1964, on the eve of the military takeover, and removed from his position as Dean of the School of Architecture. The charges against him were not published until May 4, and he was not informed of them until after he was released from prison, thanks to intervention of his many supporters, in July of that year.. Among the accusations, he was charged with such allegedly subversive acts as fomenting revolution on the campus, spreading communist propaganda, encouraging students to proselytize in the slums, allowing them to sing communist songs, and arranging for their travel to an architectural conference in Cuba. In all, Sylvio was confronted with three different sets of charges. He was also claimed to have been elected Secretary-General of a communist organization and of having presided over a meeting of the Red Student Federation. In addition, he was accused of placing his official car at the disposal of Luis Carlos Prestes in 1945 for the purpose of contacting communist cells, in addition to aiding communists by (...) contracting the services of the Spanish communist José Maria Sieiro Barreiro. Sylvio denied all these charges. In particular, he stated that he was not responsible for the improper use of vehicles when they were not in service and had never had any contact with Luis Carlos Prestes, suggesting that the 1945 allegations referred to another person by the same name

Faced with the futility of trying to defend himself and the threat of being imprisoned again, Sylvio felt that he was forced to leave Brazil. His 14 years of exile began in May 1965, when he traveled to France. After six months in Paris, he moved on to Lisbon, Portugal, for a number of months and then briefly returned to Brazil in 1966. However, soon after his arrival, circumstances almost immediately obliged him to leave the country again. After 18 months in Chile, having been assured that he was protected under a writ of habeas corpus and could resume his activities with IPHAN and the UFMG School of Architecture, he returned to Brazil once more in 1968. But not for long. In December of that year, the military government issued its most punitive decree, Institutional Act No. 5. This order suspended habeas corpus for crimes of political motivation and imposed a series of additional restrictive measures, leaving Sylvio more vulnerable than ever. In December 1969, he was forcibly “retired” from his academic position. On March 31, 1970, he left Brazil for the last time. After his assignment with the OAS in Mexico in 1971–1972, he settled in Washington, D.C., where he remained until his death.

== Written works ==
=== Books ===
- 1951 – Vila Rica: formação e desenvolvimento [Translation: Vila Rica (Ouro Preto): Formation and Development]
- 1957 – Arquitetura colonial mineira [Translation: Colonial Architecture of Minas Gerais]
- 1959 – Arquitetura no Brasil: sistemas construtivos [Translation: Architecture in Brazil: Construction Systems]
- 1959 – Pintura colonial mineira e outros temas [Translation: Colonial Painting in Minas Gerais and Other Topics]
- 1960 – Arquitetura: dois estudos [Translation: Architecture: Two Studies]
- 1961 – Vocabulário arquitetônico [Translation: Architecture Glossary]
- 1963 – Notas sobre arquitetura [Translation: Notes on Architecture]
- 1964 – Capela de Nossa Senhora do Ó [Translation: Chapel of Our Lady of O’]
- 1968 – Mineiridade: ensaio de caracterização (1° Prêmio de Erudição no Estado de Minas Gerais, 1969) [Translation: Mineirdade: An Essay on the Culture of Minas Gerais (1st Prize for Scholarly Work in Minas Gerais, 1969)]
- 1968 – Minas: cidades barrocas (1° Prêmio de Livro de Arte na Bienal de São Paulo, 1969) [Translation: Minas Gerais: Baroque Cities (1st Prize for Book on Art, São Paulo Biennial, 1969]
- 1979 – Vida e obra de Antônio Francisco Lisboa, O Aleijadinho [The Life and Work of Antônion Francisco Lisboa, O Aleijadiho]
- Formação de cidades na região aurífera brasileira [Translation: Formation of Cities in the Gold-mining Region of Brazil]

=== Collected articles ===
- 1979 – Crônicas do Exílio [Translation: Chronicles from Exile] (ed. Brasil Borges)
- 2004 – Arquitetura, Arte e Cidade [Architecture, Art, and City] (ed. Celina Borges Lemos)

=== Publications about his life and Work ===
- 2008 – Borges Brasileiro, Vanessa. Sylvio de Vasconcellos: um arquiteto para além da forma [Sylvio de Vasconcellos: an architect beyond form]
- 2020 – Vasconcellos, Muriel. Sylvio & me: An encounter in exile / Sylvio e eu: um encontro no exílio
- 2020 – Vasconcellos, Sylvio de. As memórias de Sylvio de Vasconcellos, 1936–1957. [Translation: Memoir of Sylvio de Vasconcellos, 1936–1957] (in press, Editora UFMG, Belo Horizonte, Brazil)
