= Church of Saint Francis of Assisi, Pampulha =

Church of Saint Francis of Assisi
- Igreja de Sao Francisco de Assis; Igreja da Pampulha
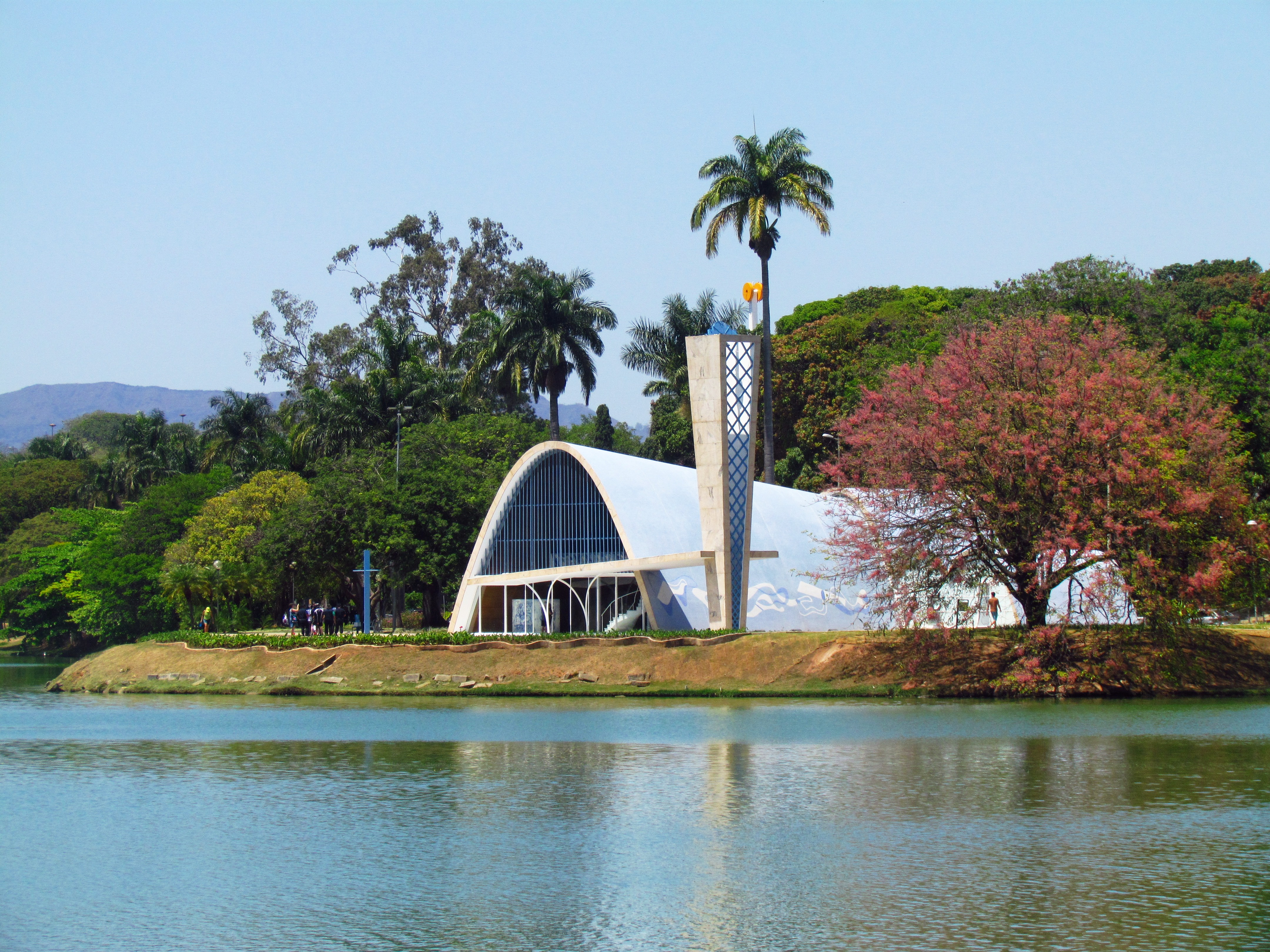
- Church of Saint Francis of Assisi, Pampulha

- Location within Brazil

General information
- Type: Church
- Architectural style: Modernist
- Location: Belo Horizonte, Minas Gerais, Brazil
- Coordinates: 19°51′30″S 43°58′44″W
- Completed: 1943
- Affiliation: Roman Catholic Archdiocese of Belo Horizonte

Technical details
- Floor count: 2

Design and construction
- Architect: Oscar Niemeyer

The Church of Saint Francis of Assisi (Portuguese: Igreja de Sao Francisco de Assis, and commonly known as the Igreja da Pampulha) is a chapel in Pampulha region of Belo Horizonte, in the state of Minas Gerais, southeastern Brazil. It was designed by the Brazilian architect Oscar Niemeyer in the organic modern style. It is the first listed modern architectural monument in Brazil and consists of four undulating concrete parabolas with outdoor mosaics. The interior hosts a mural by Candido Portinari, and the exterior features a landscape designed by Roberto Burle Marx.

The curved lines of the church enchanted artists and architects, but scandalized the city's conservative culture. Despite its completion in 1943 and Juscelino Kubitschek's call for its consecration, the church was not consecrated until 1959. For 14 years, the ecclesiastical authorities—led by Antonio dos Santos Cabral, the Archbishop of Belo Horizonte—prohibited the chapel from providing Catholic services.

As of July 2016, the church is classified as a UNESCO World Heritage Site, part of the Pampulha Modern Ensemble, a collection of Niemeyer buildings in Pampulha.

== History ==
The church was controversial from the beginning. The mayor of Belo Horizonte, Juscelino Kubitschek, was the patron of the project. Niemeyer said that he was inspired by the French poet Paul Claudel's statement: "A church is God's hangar on earth", but Time magazine wrote that the Archbishop of Belo Horizonte, Antonio dos Santos Cabral, saw it as "the devil's bomb shelter". Archbishop Cabral opposed both its unorthodox architectural and artistic forms, particularly the mural behind the altar of St. Francis with a dog depicting a wolf, painted by Candido Portinari. He proclaimed the church "unfit for religious purposes".

A later mayor of Pampulha tried to have it condemned and demolished and when that failed, abused it by filling it with altars and monuments of various styles that did not fit the building. It was finally taken over by the National Institute of Historic and Artistic Heritage. After the church was refurbished by Niemeyer, Auxiliary Archbishop João Rezende Costa (Archbishop Cabral was in virtual retirement by then) finally agreed that the church has "great artistic significance and a spiritual atmosphere" and it was consecrated. He consecrated the church in April 1959, saying "Now we can feel the wonderful art created here in homage to the Creator."

== Architecture ==
The chapel is considered the masterpiece of Niemeyer's Modern Ensemble at Pampulha. In this project, Niemeyer experimented with reinforced concrete, abandoning the architecture of slabs on columns and creating a parabolic concrete vault—a form until then only used in hangars. The concrete vault serves as both the structure and the enclosure, eliminating the need for masonry. With this project, Niemeyer started what would become the guiding principle of his later works: an architecture dominated by the plasticity of reinforced concrete in bold, unconventional, striking forms.

The interior features the Stations of the Cross, made up of 14 panels by Candido Portinari, considered one of his most characteristic works. Alfredo Ceschiatti carved the bronze bas-reliefs of the baptistery. On the exterior, the figurative art panels are by Portinari and the abstract ones are by Paulo Werneck. The exterior walls are covered in pastel ceramic tiles in shades of light blue and white, forming abstract designs. The distinctive landscape of the church is the work of Roberto Burle Marx, a longtime Niemeyer collaborator. The little church of Pampulha is one of the most well-known "postcard scenes" of Belo Horizonte.

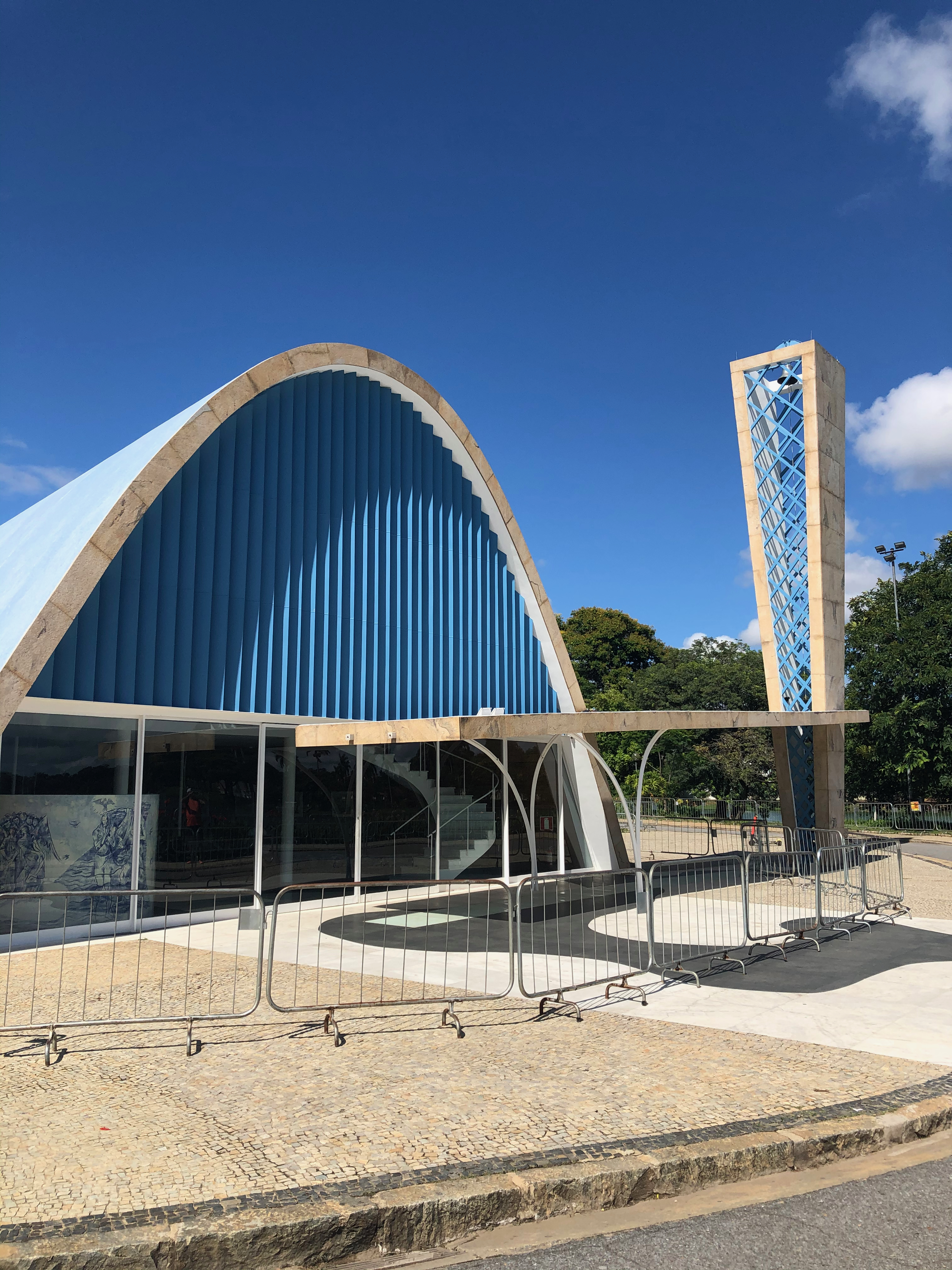

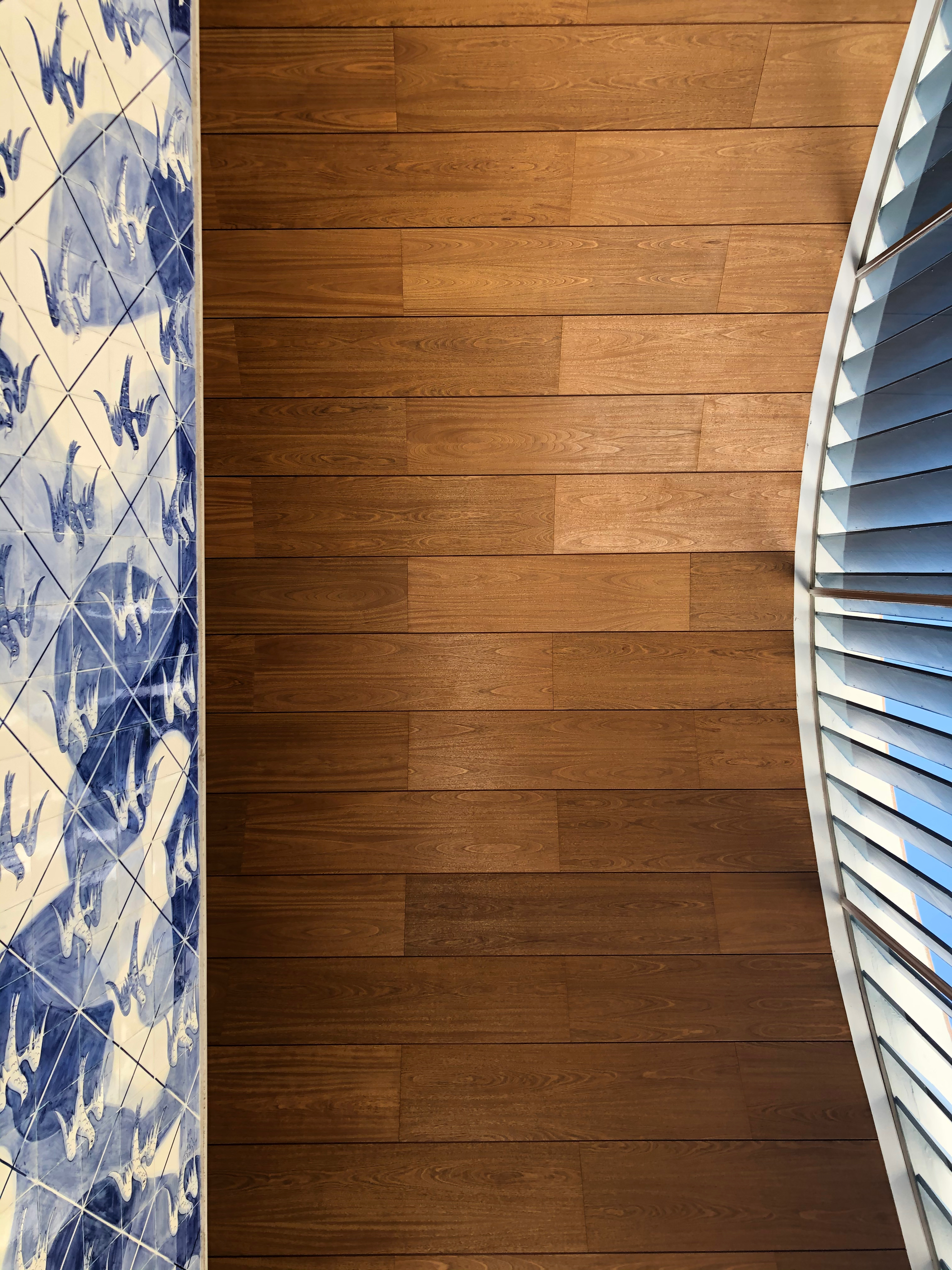

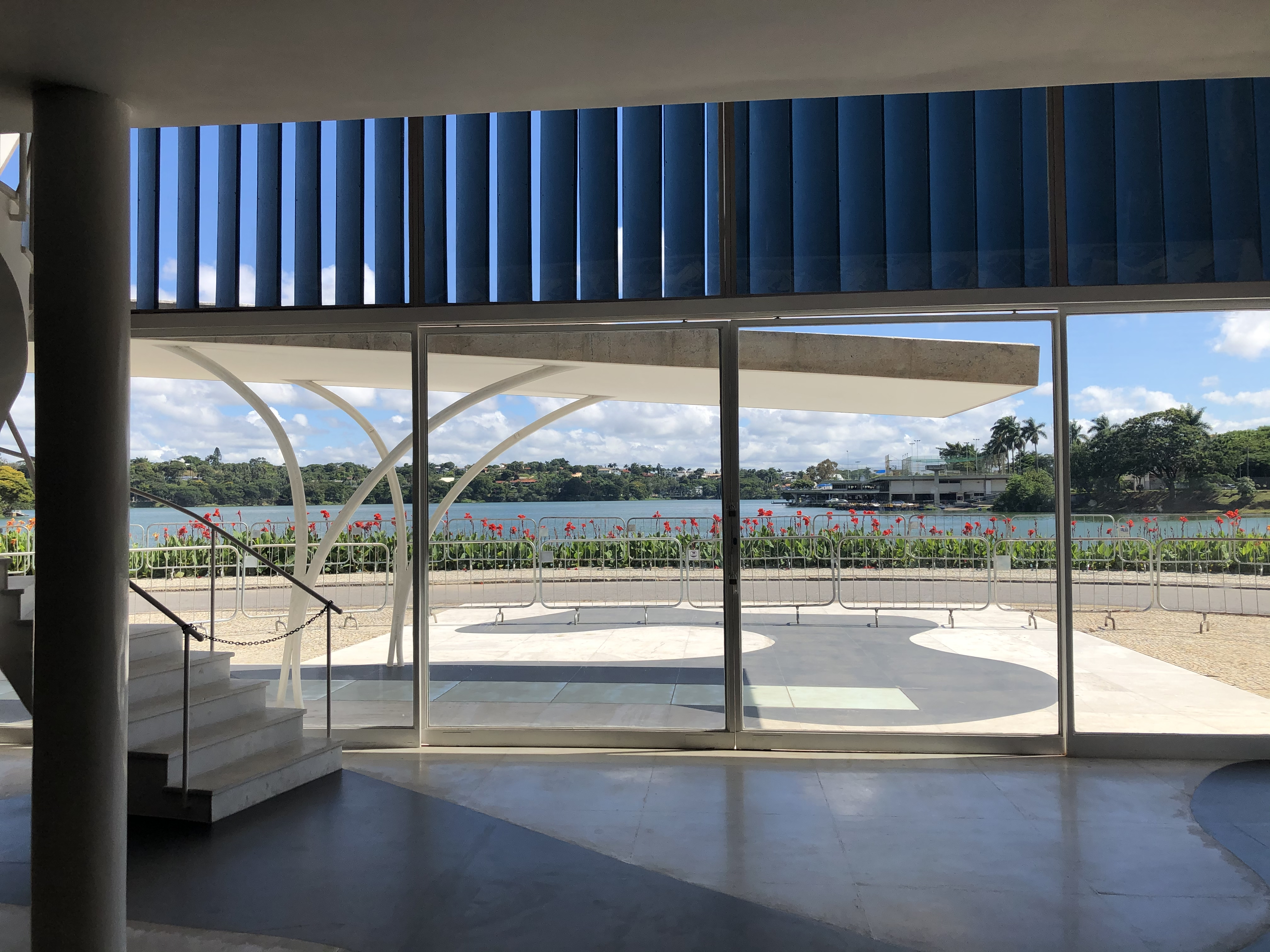

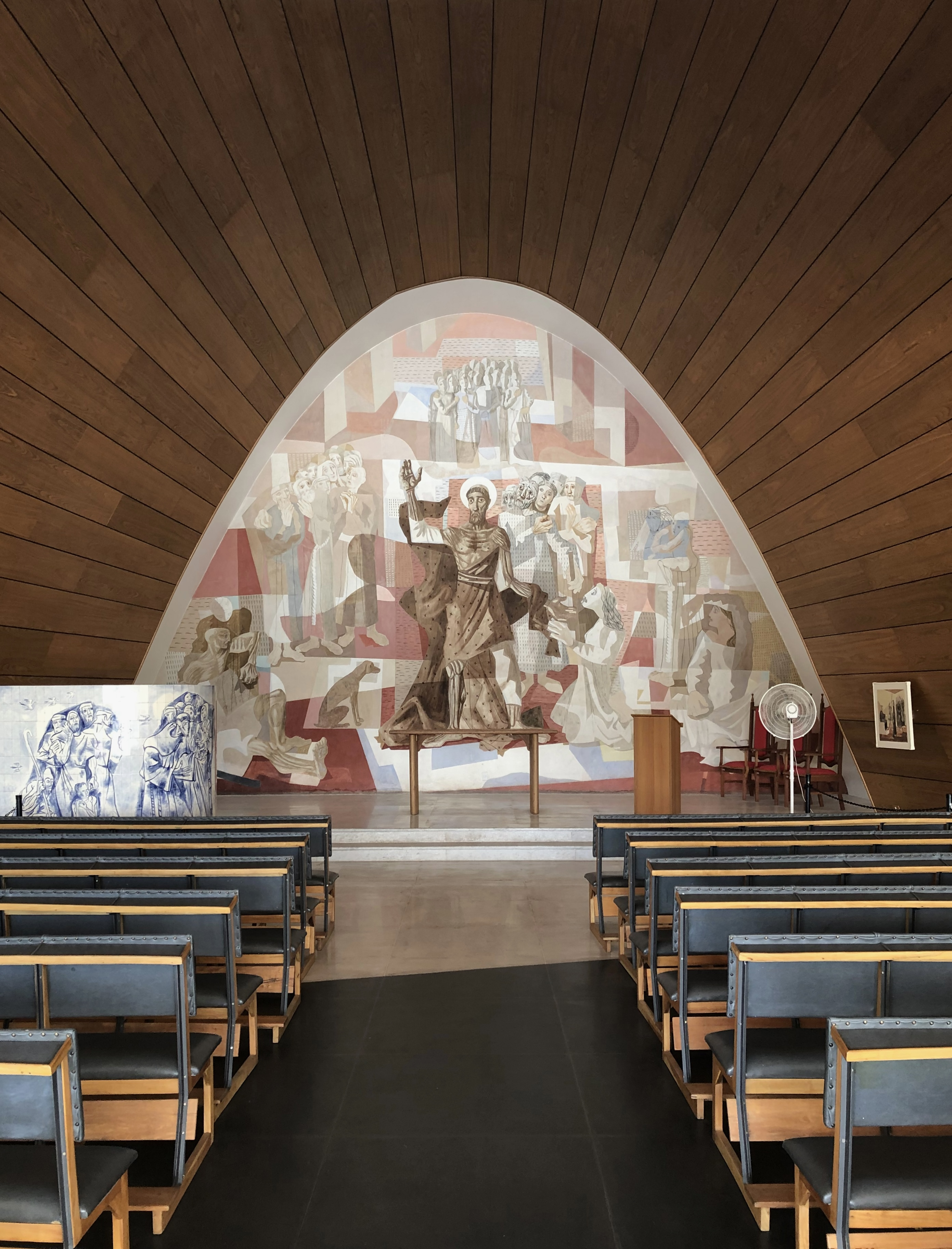

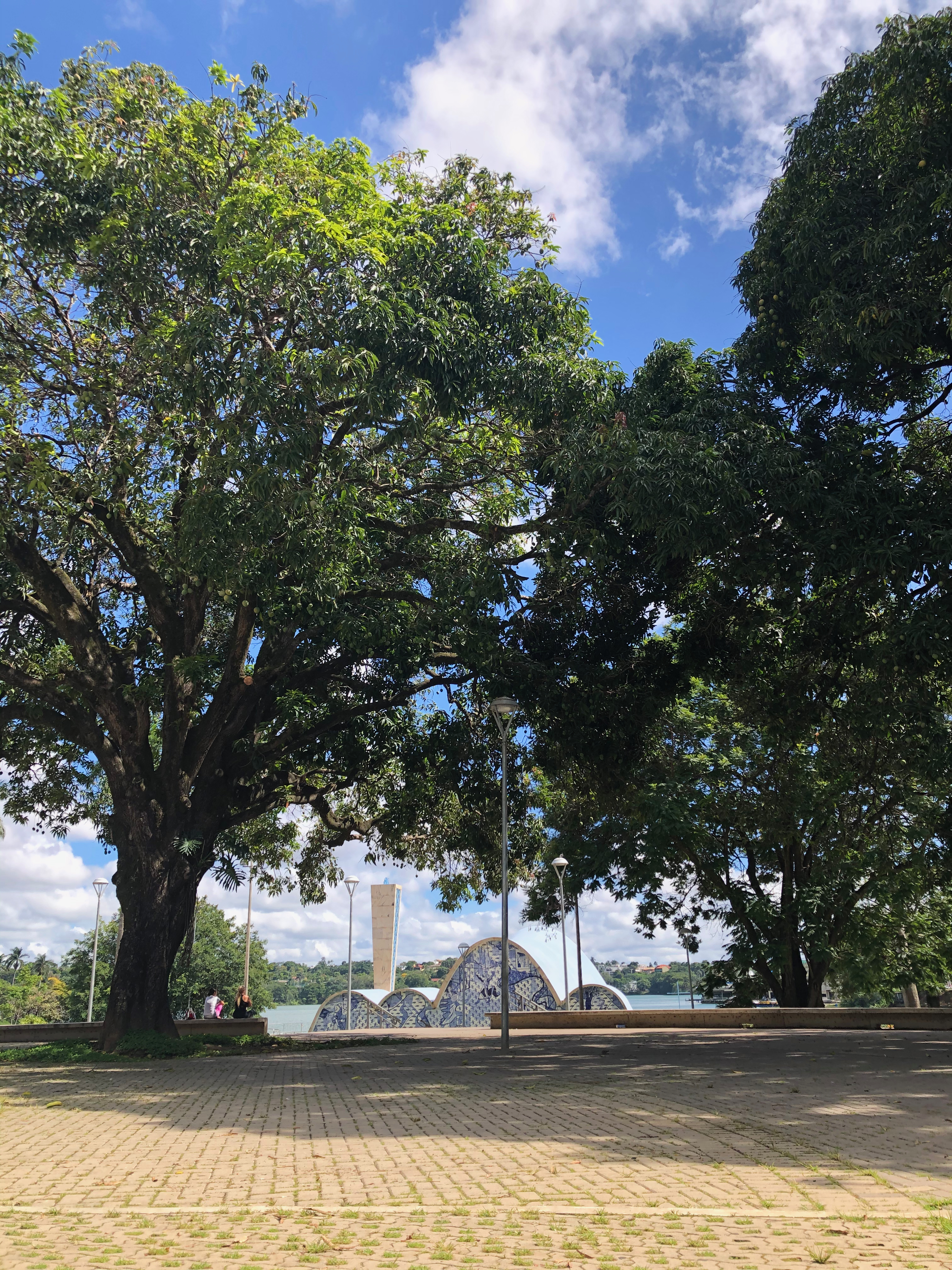

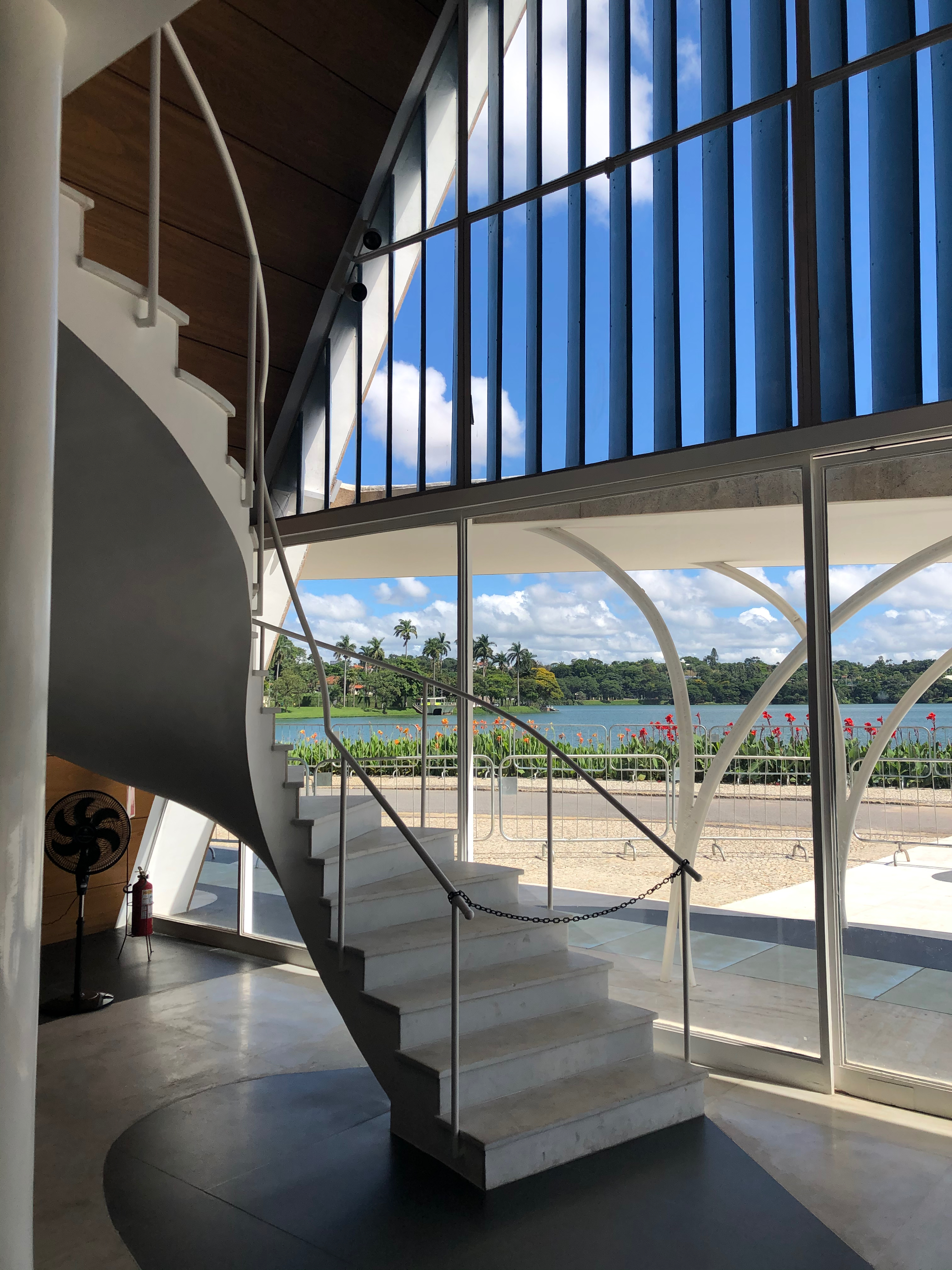

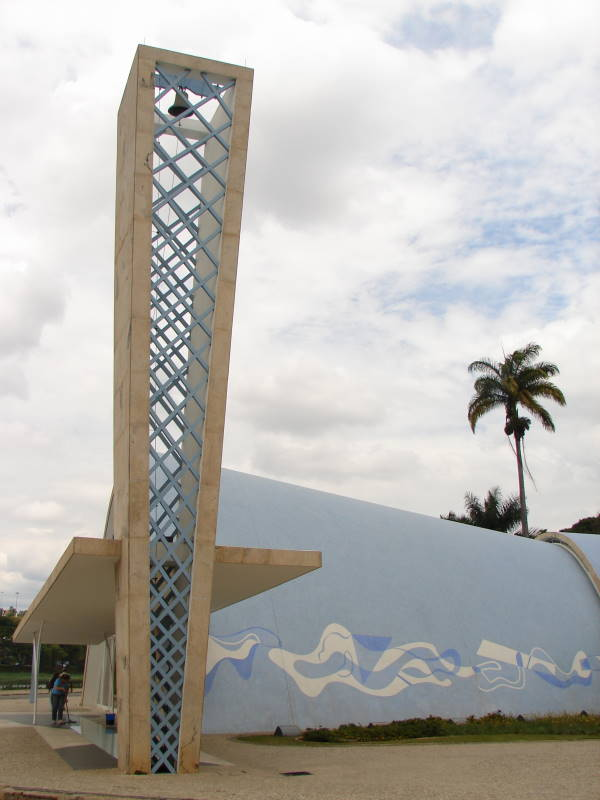

== Heritage status ==
The Church of Saint Francis of Assisi has been recognized as a heritage site by the Minas Gerais State Institute of Historic and Artistic Heritage (IEPHA-MG) since 1984, the National Institute of Historic and Artistic Heritage (IPHAN) since 1997, and the Municipal Cultural Heritage Board of Minas Gerais.

The Church of Saint Francis of Assisi became a UNESCO World Heritage Site in July 2016. It is part of the Pampulha Modern Ensemble, a UNESCO-designated collection of Niemeyer buildings in Pampulha.

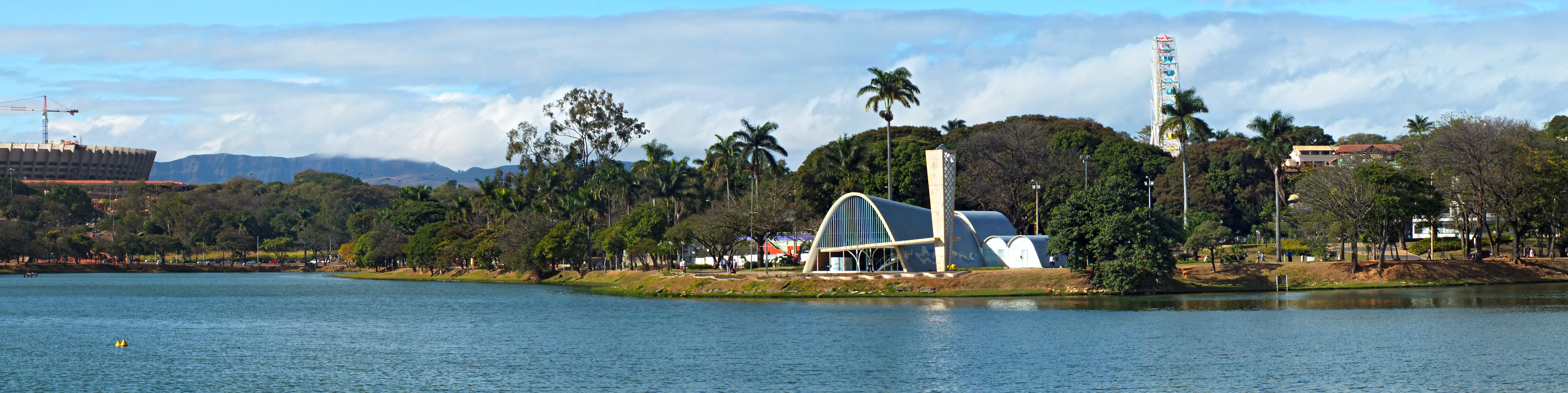
Saint Francis of Assisi Church as seen from the Pampulha Lake

== See also ==
- List of Oscar Niemeyer works
