= Pampulha Modern Ensemble =

UNESCO World Heritage Site
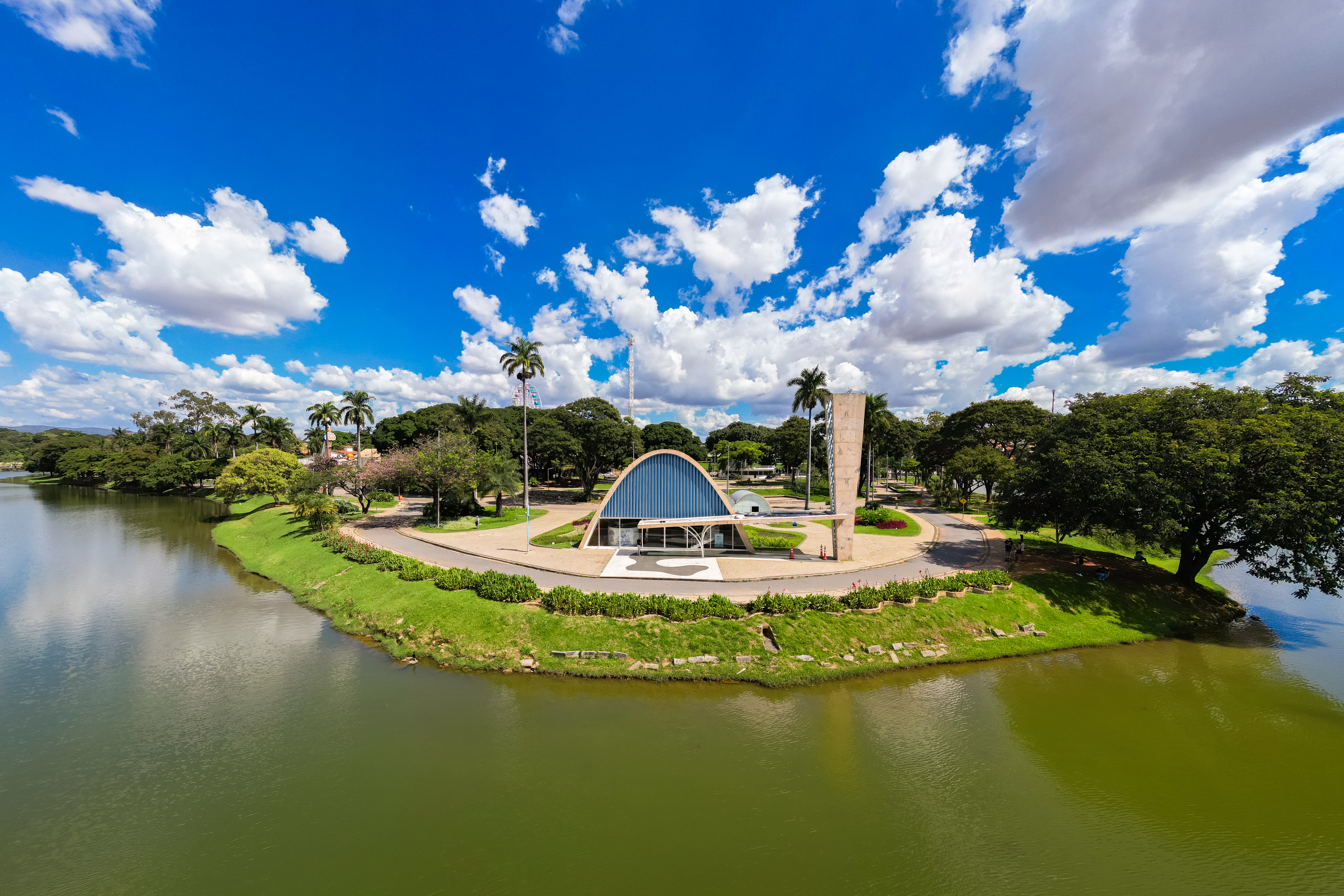

- Location within Brazil
- Location: Pampulha, Belo Horizonte, Minas Gerais, Brazil
- Criteria: Cultural: (i), (ii), (iv)
- Reference: 1493
- Inscription: 2016 (40th Session)
- Area: 154 ha (380 acres)
- Buffer zone: 1,418 ha (3,500 acres)
- Coordinates: 19°51′07″S 43°58′25″W

The Pampulha Modern Ensemble (Portuguese: Conjunto Moderno da Pampulha) is an urban project in Belo Horizonte, Minas Gerais state of Brazil. It was designed around an artificial lake, Lake Pampulha, in the district of Pampulha and includes a casino (currently Pampulha Art Museum), a ballroom (Casa do Baile), the Golf Yacht Club (currently Iate Tênis Clube) and the Church of Saint Francis of Assisi. The buildings were designed by the architect Oscar Niemeyer, in collaboration with the landscape architect Roberto Burle Marx, Brazilian Modernist artists, and structural engineer Joaquim Cardozo.

In July 2016, the site was declared a UNESCO World Heritage Site because of its outstanding examples of modern architecture and its importance in the development of a Brazilian architectural identity.
