= Lake Pampulha =

Artificial lake in Belo Horizonte, Brazil

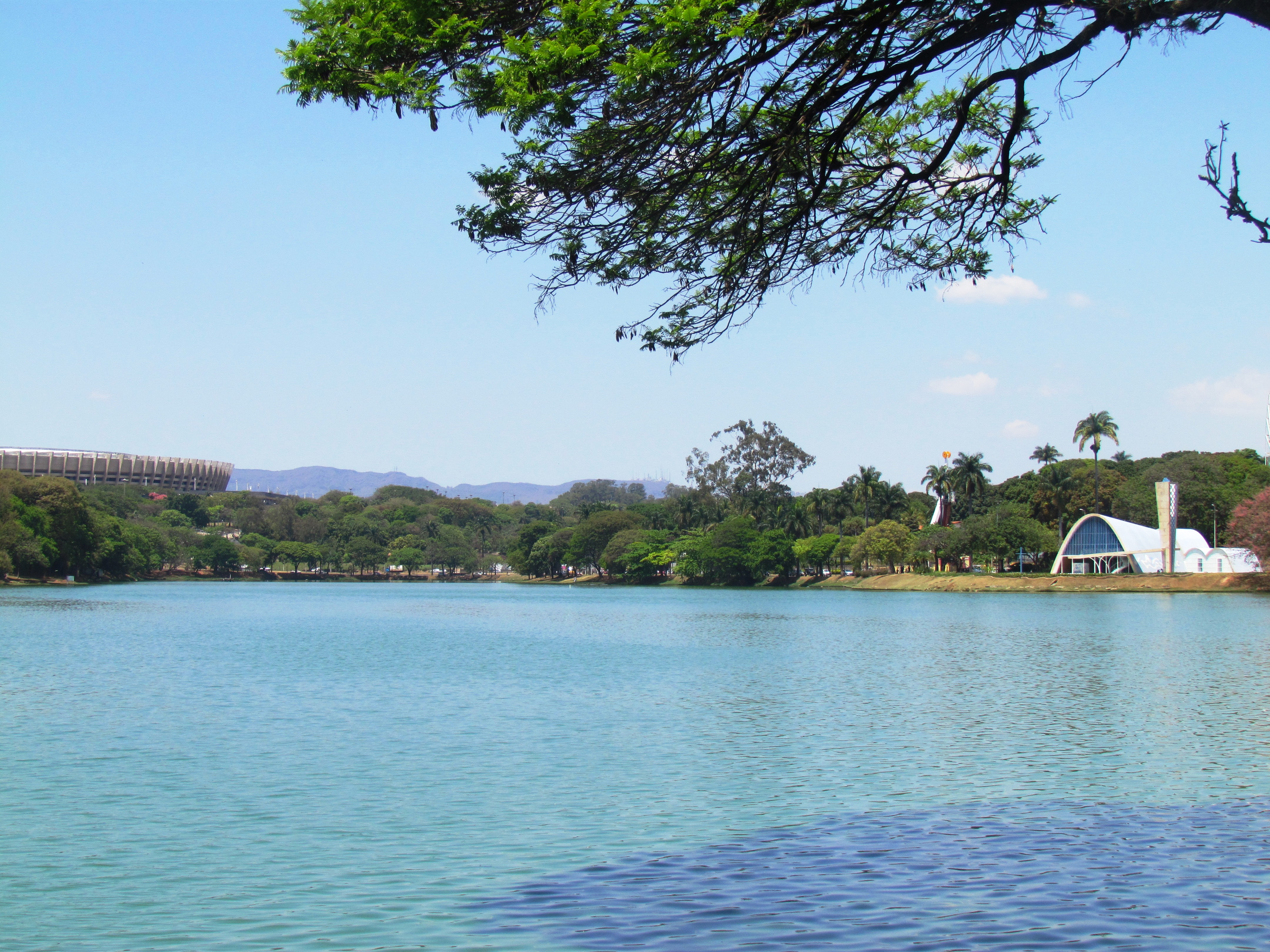
- Pampulha Lake in Belo Horizonte

- Location within Brazil
- Interactive map of Lake Pampulha
- Location: Belo Horizonte, Minas Gerais
- Coordinates: 19°51′07″S 43°59′00″W
- Lake type: Artificial
- Surface area: 2.6 square kilometres (1.0 sq mi)
- Average depth: 5 metres (16 ft)
- Max. depth: 16 metres (52 ft)
- Water volume: 14,000,000 cubic metres (18,000,000 cu yd)
- Shore length^{1}: 18 kilometres (11 miles)
- Surface elevation: 801 metres (2,628 ft)
- ^{1} Shore length is not a well-defined measure.

Lake Pampulha (Portuguese: Lagoa da Pampulha, Portuguese pronunciation: [pɐ̃ˈpuʎɐ]) is an artificial lake located in Belo Horizonte, Minas Gerais, Brazil. Built from 1936 to 1943, it covers 2.6 square kilometres (1.0 sq mi), has a volume of 14,000,000 cubic metres (18,000,000 cu yd), and a drainage basin of 97 square kilometres (37 mi^{2}). It has a mean depth of 5.1 metres (17 ft) and reaches a maximum depth of 16 metres (52 ft). The lake is fed by 8 small streams, the largest being the Sarandi and Ressaca.

The lake is located within the Pampulha administrative region (região administrativa). One of the 29 neighborhoods (bairros) within the administrative region has the same name. 424,000 residents live in the catchment area of the lake.

Many of Belo Horizonte's cultural landmarks are located around or close to the lake, including the Federal University of Minas Gerais, the soccer stadium Mineirão, the Mineirinho Arena, the Church of Saint Francis of Assisi, the Iate Tênis Clube and the Museum of Modern Art (the latter three designed by Oscar Niemeyer).

== History ==
Construction of the lake began in 1936 by Otacílio Negrão de Lima, mayor of Belo Horizonte, by damming a small stream called Pampulha, with the goal of creating a water reservoir to improve flood control and drinkable water supply.

In the early 1940s, a planned suburb was built around the lake by city mayor Juscelino Kubitschek, later president of Brazil from 1956 to 1961. He called on the architect Oscar Niemeyer to design a series of buildings around Lake Pampulha in 1941. These include the Church of Saint Francis of Assisi, the Art Museum, the Casa de Baile ("house of dance", in a loose translation) and the Tennis Club. The Burle Marx gardens, paintings by Portinari and sculptures by Ceschiatti, Zamoiski and José Pedrosa complete and enhance the project conceived for the lake. The group of buildings and artwork became a reference point for the development of modern Brazilian art and architecture. In July 2016 the buildings designed by Niemeyer were named a UNESCO World Heritage site. Today these buildings offer visitors the chance to see the 'birth' of modernism in Brazil, as Neimeyer's concepts and use of reinforced, curved concrete became a hallmark of the modernist movement around the world.

By the side of the lake are a number of leisure facilities such as the Governor Magalhães Pinto Stadium (better known as "Mineirão"), the Mineirinho gymnasium, the Botanical Gardens, the Zoo, the Ecological Park, the Equestrian Centre and tracks for cycling and walking.

== Environment ==
Lake Pampulha became severely polluted in the 1980s, due to rapid urbanization of the catchment area, the discharge of untreated sewage from the surrounding neighborhoods in Belo Horizonte, and unabated erosion in many points of the drainage basin. Cyanobacterial blooms are a frequent occurrence.

In February 2020, a new amoebic virus named "Yaravirus" was found in the waters of Lake Pampulha, with genes that had never been seen before in any life-form and may be a member of or at least related to NCLDV giant viruses (aka Nucleocyroviricota). This finding was preceded by a former one of "Niemeyer virus", a species of genus Mimivirus (NCLDV) in 2014 along with two isolates of "Pandoravirus" (NCLDV also) taken from two of the creeks feeding the lake: "P. pampulha from Mergulhão creek and "Pandoravirus tropicalis" from Bom Jesus creek (2019). As these are viruses with unicellular amoeboid hosts and therefore are not known to be harmful for humans.
