= Pampulha (Belo Horizonte) =

- Administrative Region
- Região Administrativa da Pampulha; Administrative Region of Pampulha
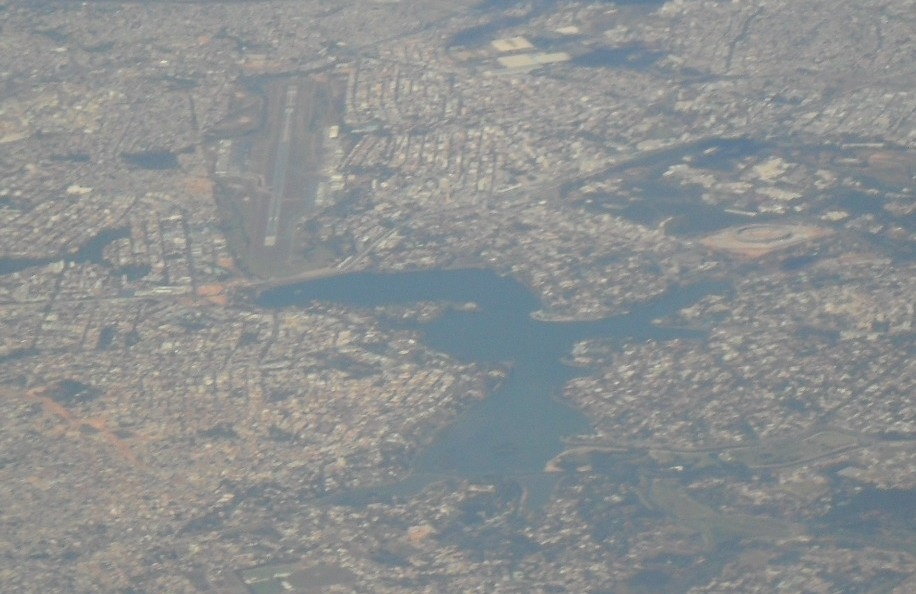
- Aerial view of Pampulha

- Location of Pampulha in Belo Horizonte

- Location in Brazil
- Coordinates: 19°51′44″S 43°58′14″W
- Country: Brazil
- Region: Southeast
- State: Minas Gerais
- City: Belo Horizonte
- Founded: 1943

Area
  - Total: 47.13 km^{2} (18.20 sq mi)

Population (2015)
  - Total: 145,262
  - Density: 3.08/km^{2} (8.0/sq mi)
- Time zone: UTC-3 (Brasilia Official Time)
  - Summer (DST): UTC-2 (Brazilian Daylight Saving Time)

Pampulha (Portuguese: Região Administrativa da Pampulha) is an administrative region in the city of Belo Horizonte, Brazil. It is one of nine administrative regions of Belo Horizonte, and occupies 47.13 kilometres (29.29 mi) in the northeast of the city. It has a population of 350,000 and a population density of 3.08 per square kilometer. The center of the Pampulha is occupied by Lake Pampulha, an artificial lake constructed in the early 1940s by Mayor Juscelino Kubitschek, later president of Brazil from 1956 to 1961. The Pampulha administrative region is further subdivided into 29 neighborhoods (bairros), one of which is also called Pampulha.

Otacílio Negrão de Lima, mayor of Belo Horizonte in the early 20th century, dammed a small stream called Pampulha in 1936 for flood control and augment the city water supply through the creation of a reservoir. The resulting Lake Pampulha became the site of an urban development project by Juscelino Kubitschek. Kubitschek called on the young architect Oscar Niemeyer to create a series of buildings; Niemeyer was joined by the landscape architect Roberto Burle Marx and numerous artists to create site now considered the earliest and most important example of Modernism in Brazil.

In July 2016 the area around the lake became an UNESCO World Heritage Site known as the Pampulha Modern Ensemble (Conjunto Arquitetônico da Pampulha).

== Transport ==
Belo Horizonte/Pampulha – Carlos Drummond de Andrade Airport is in the area.

== Education ==
The Santa Amélia section formerly housed the Escola Japonesa de Belo Horizonte (ベロ・オリゾンテ日本人学校) a.k.a. Instituto Cultural Mokuyoo-Kai Sociedade Civil, a Japanese day school.
