= Visual inertia =

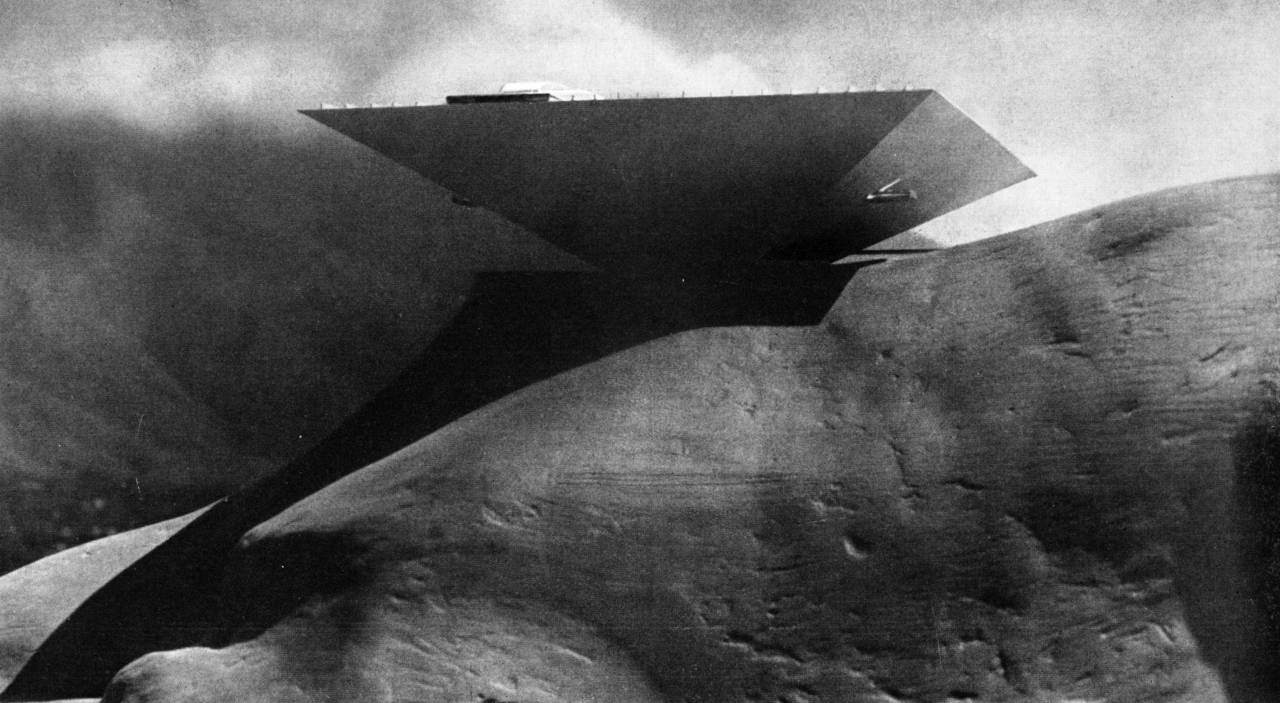
Museum of Modern Art in Caracas has low inertia

In theory of architecture, visual inertia (also known as visual weight) is a characteristic of perceived concentration and stability of an architectural form. The impression of visual inertia depends on the shape of the form and its orientation with respect to the ground plane. It can be affected by the line of sight.

The concept was initially proposed by Rudolf Arnheim as "visual weight". A form with low inertia (like the Museum of Modern Art in Caracas) creates an appearance of movement due to its weight.

== Sources ==
- Ahmadi, Mosleh (2019). "The experience of movement in the built form and space: A framework for movement evaluation in architecture". Cogent Arts & Humanities. 6 (1) 1588090. doi:10.1080/23311983.2019.1588090.
- Ching, Francis D. K. (2007). Architecture: Form, Space, and Order (PDF) (3rd ed.). John Wiley & Sons. ISBN 978-0-471-75216-5.
