= Oscar Niemeyer =

Brazilian architect (1907–2012)

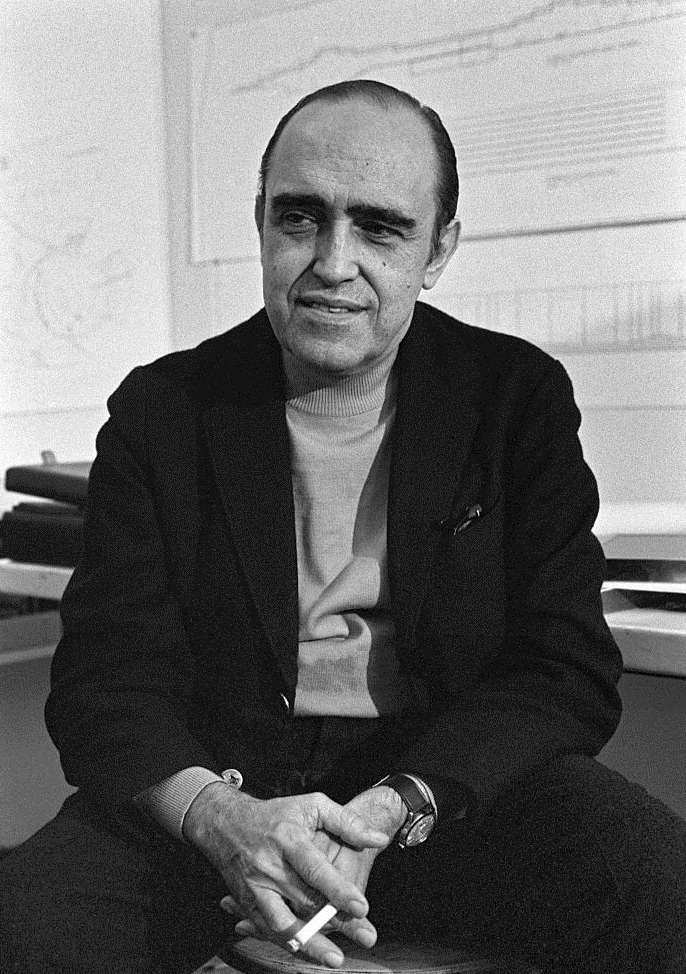
- Niemeyer in 1968
- Born: 15 December 1907; Rio de Janeiro, Brazil
- Died: 5 December 2012 (aged 104); Rio de Janeiro, Brazil
- Resting place: São João Batista Cemetery, Rio de Janeiro, Brazil
- Education: Escola Nacional de Belas Artes; Federal University of Rio de Janeiro
- Occupation: Architect
- Spouses: Annita Baldo (m. 1928; died 2004); Vera Lúcia Cabreira (m. 2006)
- Children: Anna Maria
- Awards: 1963 Lenin Peace Prize; 1988 Pritzker Prize; 1989 Prince of Asturias Awards; 1998 RIBA Royal Gold Medal; 2004 Praemium Imperiale
- Buildings: See list
- Projects: Museum of Modern Art in Caracas

Oscar Ribeiro de Almeida Niemeyer Soares Filho (15 December 1907 – 5 December 2012), known as Oscar Niemeyer (Brazilian Portuguese: [ˈoskaʁ ni.eˈmajeʁ]), was a Brazilian architect considered to be one of the key figures in the development of modern architecture. Niemeyer was best known for his design of civic buildings for Brasília, a planned city that became Brazil's capital in 1960, as well as his collaboration with other architects on the headquarters of the United Nations in New York. His exploration of the aesthetic possibilities of reinforced concrete was highly influential in the late 20th and early 21st centuries.

Both lauded and criticized for being a "sculptor of monuments", Niemeyer was hailed as a great artist and one of the greatest architects of his generation by his supporters. He said his architecture was strongly influenced by Le Corbusier, but in an interview, assured that this "didn't prevent [his] architecture from going in a different direction". Niemeyer was most famous for his use of abstract forms and curves and wrote in his memoirs:

I am not attracted to straight angles or to the straight line, hard and inflexible, created by man. I am attracted to free-flowing, sensual curves. The curves that I find in the mountains of my country, in the sinuousness of its rivers, in the waves of the ocean, and on the body of the beloved woman. Curves make up the entire Universe, the curved Universe of Einstein.

Niemeyer was educated at the Escola Nacional de Belas Artes at the Federal University of Rio de Janeiro, and after graduating, he worked at his father's typography house and as a draftsman for local architectural firms. In the 1930s, he interned with Lúcio Costa, with the pair collaborating on the design for the Palácio Gustavo Capanema in Rio de Janeiro. Niemeyer's first major project was a series of buildings for Pampulha, a planned suburb north of Belo Horizonte at the invitation of its mayor, Juscelino Kubitschek. His work, especially on the Church of Saint Francis of Assisi, received critical acclaim and drew international attention.

Throughout the 1940s and 1950s, Niemeyer became one of Brazil's most prolific architects, working both domestically and overseas. This included the design of the Edifício Copan (a large residential building in São Paulo) and a collaboration with Le Corbusier (and others) on the United Nations Headquarters, which yielded invitations to teach at Yale University and the Harvard Graduate School of Design.

In 1956, Niemeyer was invited by Brazil's new president, Juscelino Kubitschek, to design the civic buildings for Brazil's new capital, Brasília. His designs for the National Congress of Brazil, the Cathedral of Brasília, the Palácio da Alvorada, the Palácio do Planalto, and the Supreme Federal Court, all designed by 1960, were experimental and linked by common design elements. This work led to his appointment as inaugural head of architecture at the University of Brasília, as well as honorary membership of the American Institute of Architects.

Due to his largely left-wing ideology and involvement with the Brazilian Communist Party (PCB), Niemeyer left the country after the 1964 military coup and opened an office in Paris. He returned to Brazil in 1985, and was awarded the prestigious Pritzker Architecture Prize in 1988. A socialist and atheist from an early age, Niemeyer had spent time in both Cuba and the Soviet Union during his exile, and on his return served as the PCB's president from 1992 to 1996.

Niemeyer continued working at the end of the 20th and early 21st century, notably designing the Niterói Contemporary Art Museum (1996) and the Oscar Niemeyer Museum (2002). Over a career of 78 years he designed approximately 600 projects. Niemeyer died in Rio de Janeiro on 5 December 2012 at the age of 104.

== Biography ==
=== Early life and education ===
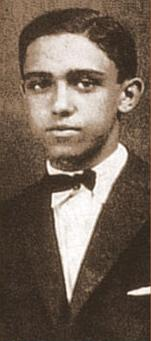
Niemeyer in 1917

Niemeyer was born in the city of Rio de Janeiro on 15 December 1907. Niemeyer spoke about it: "my name ought to have been Oscar Ribeiro de Almeida de Niemeyer Soares, or simply Oscar de Almeida Soares, but the foreign surname prevailed and I am known simply as Oscar Niemeyer". He spent his youth as a typical young Carioca of the time: bohemian and relatively unconcerned with his future. In 1928, at age 21, Niemeyer left school (Santo Antonio Maria Zaccaria priory school) and married Annita Baldo, daughter of Italian immigrants from Padua. He pursued his passion at the National School of Fine Arts in Rio de Janeiro and graduated with a BA in architecture in 1934.

=== Early career ===
After graduating, Niemeyer worked in his father's typography house. Even though he was not financially stable, he insisted on working in the architecture studio of Lúcio Costa, Gregori Warchavchik and Carlos Leão, even though they could not pay him. Niemeyer joined them as a draftsman, an art that he mastered (Corbusier himself would later compliment Niemeyer's 'beautiful perspectives'). The contact with Costa would be important to Niemeyer's maturation. After an initial flirtation with the Neocolonial movement, Costa believed that the advances of the International Style in Europe were the way forward for architecture. His writings on the insights that could unite Brazil's traditional colonial architecture (such as that in Olinda) with modernist principles would be the basis of the architecture that he and his contemporaries, such as Affonso Eduardo Reidy, would later realize.

In 1936, at the age of 29, Lúcio Costa was appointed by Education Minister Gustavo Capanema to design the new headquarters of the Ministry of Education and Health in Rio de Janeiro. Costa himself, although open to change, was unsure of how to proceed. He assembled a group of young architects (Carlos Leão, Affonso Eduardo Reidy, Jorge Moreira and Ernani Vasconcellos) to design the building. He also insisted that Le Corbusier himself should be invited as a consultant. Though Niemeyer was not initially part of the team, Costa agreed to accept him after Niemeyer insisted. During the period of Le Corbusier's stay in Rio, he was appointed to help the master with his drafts, which allowed him a close contact with the Swiss. After his departure, Niemeyer's significant changes to Corbusier's scheme impressed Costa, who allowed him to progressively take charge of the project, of which he assumed leadership in 1939.

==== Brazilian modernism ====
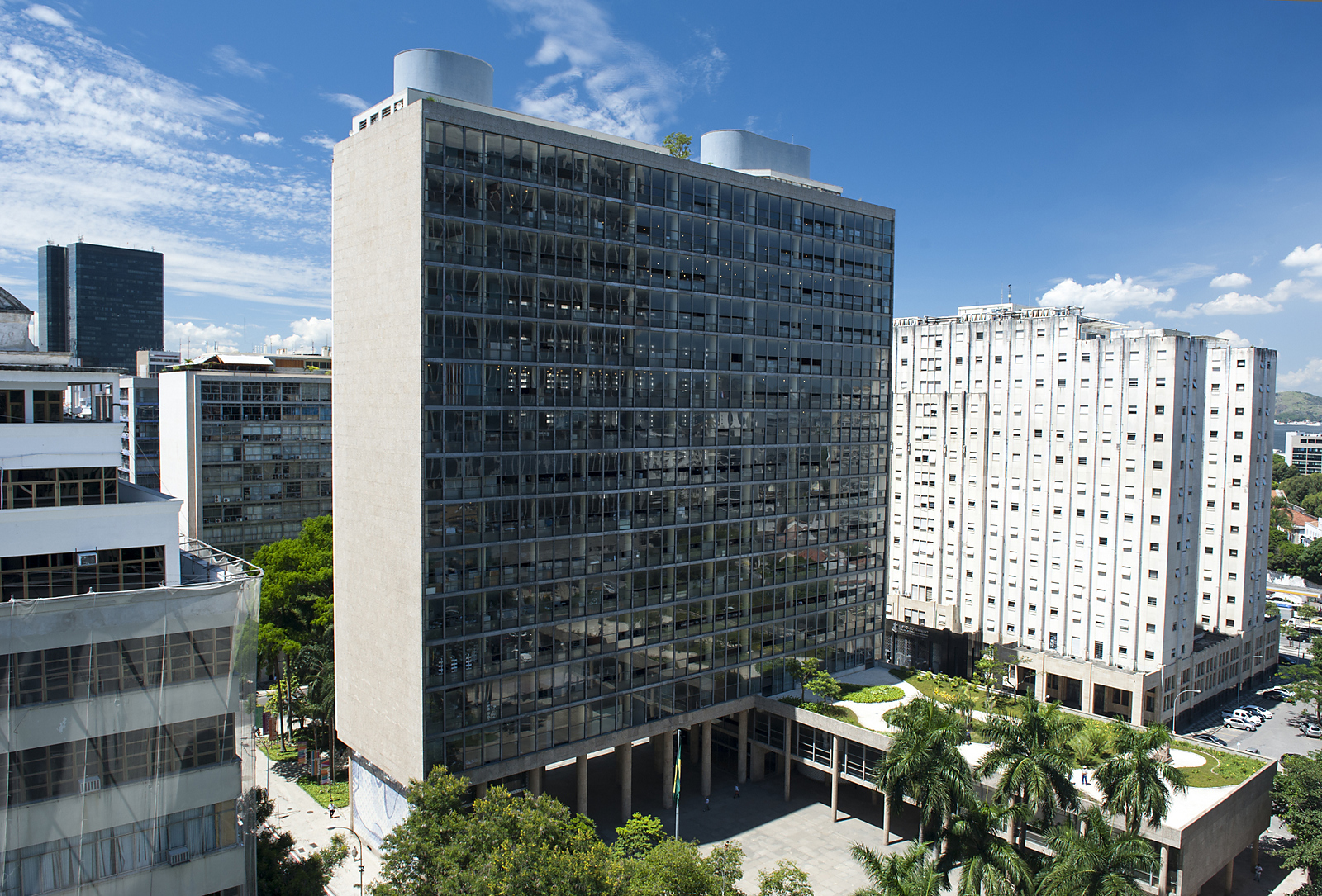
Ministry of Education and Health, Rio de Janeiro

The Ministry of Education had assumed the task of shaping the "novo homem, Brasileiro e moderno" (new man, Brazilian and modern). It was the first state-sponsored modernist skyscraper in the world, of a much larger scale than anything Le Corbusier had built until then. Completed in 1943, when he was 36 years old, the building that housed the regulator and manager of Brazilian culture and cultural heritage developed the elements of what was to become recognized as Brazilian modernism. It employed local materials and techniques, like the azulejos linked to the Portuguese tradition; the revolutionized Corbusian brises-soleil, made adjustable and related to the Moorish shading devices of colonial architecture; bold colors; the tropical gardens of Roberto Burle Marx; the Imperial Palm (Roystonea oleracea), known as the Brazilian order; further allusions to the icons of the Brazilian landscape; and specially commissioned works by Brazilian artists. This building is considered by some architects as one of the most influential of the 20th century. It was taken as a model on how to blend low- and high-rise structures (Lever House).

==== 1939 New York World's Fair ====
In 1939, at age 32, Niemeyer and Costa designed the Brazilian pavilion for the New York World's Fair (executed in collaboration with Paul Lester Wiener). Neighbouring the much larger French pavilion, the Brazilian structure contrasted with its heavy mass. Costa explained that the Brazilian Pavilion adopted a language of 'grace and elegance', lightness and spatial fluidity, with an open plan, curves and free walls, which he termed 'Ionic', contrasting it to the mainstream contemporary modernist architecture, which he termed 'Doric'. Impressed by its avant-garde design, Mayor Fiorello La Guardia awarded Niemeyer the keys to the city of New York.

In 1937, Niemeyer was invited by a relative to design a nursery for philanthropic institution which catered for young mothers, the Obra do Berço. It would become his first finalised work. However, Niemeyer has said that his architecture really began in Pampulha, Minas Gerais, and as he explained in an interview, Pampulha was the starting point of this freer architecture full of curves which I still love even today. It was in fact, the beginning of Brasília ....

=== Pampulha Project ===
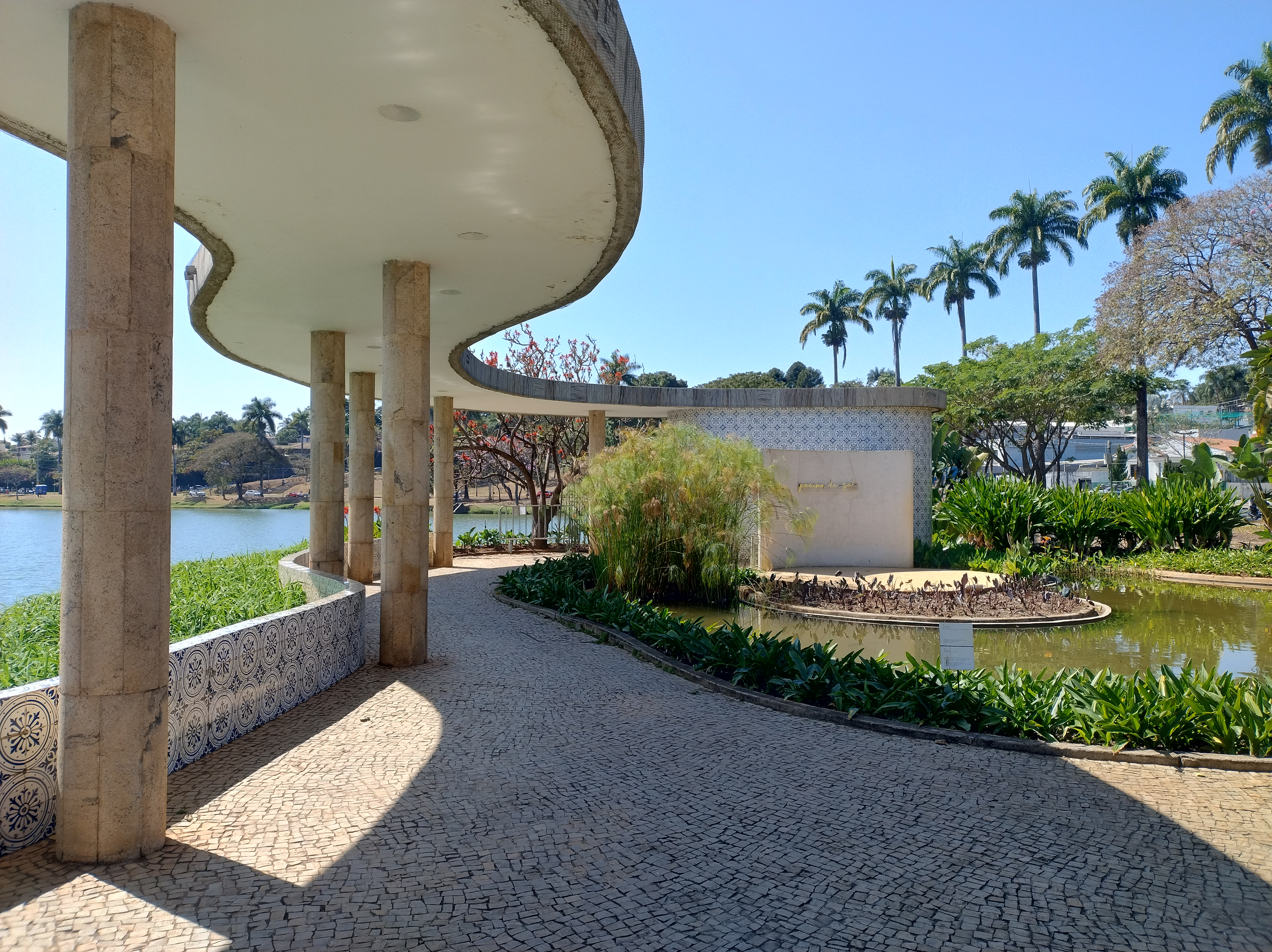
The free-form marquee at Casa do Baile

In 1940, at 33, Niemeyer met Juscelino Kubitschek, who was at the time the mayor of Belo Horizonte, capital of the state of Minas Gerais. Kubitschek, together with the state's governor Benedito Valadares, wanted to develop a new suburb to the north of the city called Pampulha and commissioned Niemeyer to design a series of buildings which would become known as the "Pampulha architectural complex". The complex included a casino, a restaurant/dance hall, a yacht club, a golf club and a church, all of which would be distributed around a new artificial lake. A weekend retreat for the mayor was built near the lake.

The buildings were completed in 1943 and received international acclaim following the 1943 'Brazil Builds' exhibition, at the New York Museum of Modern Art (MoMA). Most of the buildings show Niemeyer's particular approach to the Corbusian language. In the casino, with its relatively rigid main façade, Niemeyer departed from Corbusian principles and designed curved volumes outside the confinement of a rational grid. He also expanded upon Corbusier's idea of a promenade architecturale with his designs for floating catwalk-like ramps which unfold open vistas to the occupants.

The small restaurant (Casa do Baile), which is perhaps the least bourgeois of the complex, is built on its own artificial island and comprises an approximately circular block from which a free-form marquee follows the contour of the island. Although free form had been used even in Corbusier's and Mies's architecture, its application on an outdoors marquee was Niemeyer's innovation. This application of free-form, together with the butterfly roof used at the Yacht Club and Kubitschek's house became extremely fashionable from then on.

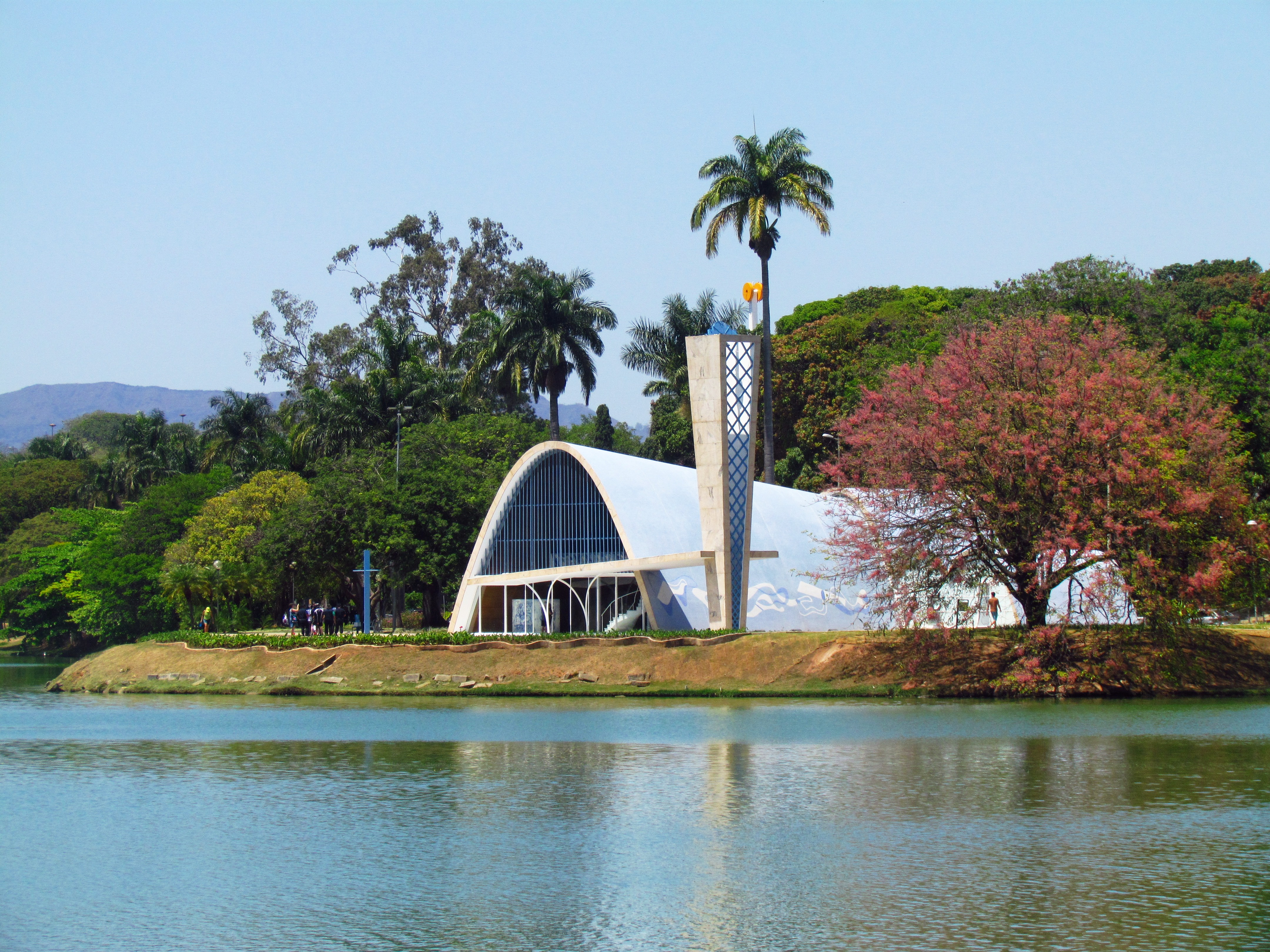
São Francisco de Assis Church, Belo Horizonte, Minas Gerais

The Church of Saint Francis of Assisi is considered the masterpiece of the complex. When it was built, reinforced concrete was used in traditional ways, such as in pillar, beam and slab structures. Auguste Perret, in Casablanca and Robert Maillart in Zurich had experimented with the plastic freedom of concrete, taking advantage of the parabolic arch's geometry to build extremely thin shells. Niemeyer's decision to use such an economical approach, based on the inherent plasticity allowed by reinforced concrete was revolutionary. According to Joaquim Cardoso, the unification of wall and roof into a single element was revolutionary for fusing vertical and horizontal elements. The church's exuberance added to the integration between architecture and art. The church is covered by Azulejos by Portinari and tile murals by Paulo Werneck. It led to the church being seen as baroque. Though some European purists condemned its formalism, the fact that the form's idea was directly linked to a logical, structural reason placed the building in the 20th century, while refusing to break completely from the past.

Due to its importance in the history of architecture, the church was the first listed modern building in Brazil. This fact did not influence the conservative church authorities of Minas Gerais, who refused to consecrate it until 1959, in part because of its unorthodox form and in part because of Portinari's altar mural, which depicts Saint Francis as the savior of the ill, the poor and, most importantly, the sinner.

Niemeyer stated that Pampulha offered him the opportunity to 'challenge the monotony of contemporary architecture, the wave of misinterpreted functionalism that hindered it and the dogmas of form and function that had emerged, counteracting the plastic freedom that reinforced concrete introduced. I was attracted by the curve – the liberated, sensual curve suggested by the possibilities of new technology yet so often recalled in venerable old baroque churches. [...] I deliberately disregarded the right angle and rationalist architecture designed with ruler and square to boldly enter the world of curves and straight lines offered by reinforced concrete. [...] This deliberate protest arose from the environment in which I lived, with its white beaches, its huge mountains, its old baroque churches and the beautiful suntanned women.'

The experience also marked the first collaborations between Niemeyer and Roberto Burle Marx, considered the most important modern landscape architect. They would be partners in many projects in the next 10 years.

=== 1940s and 1950s ===
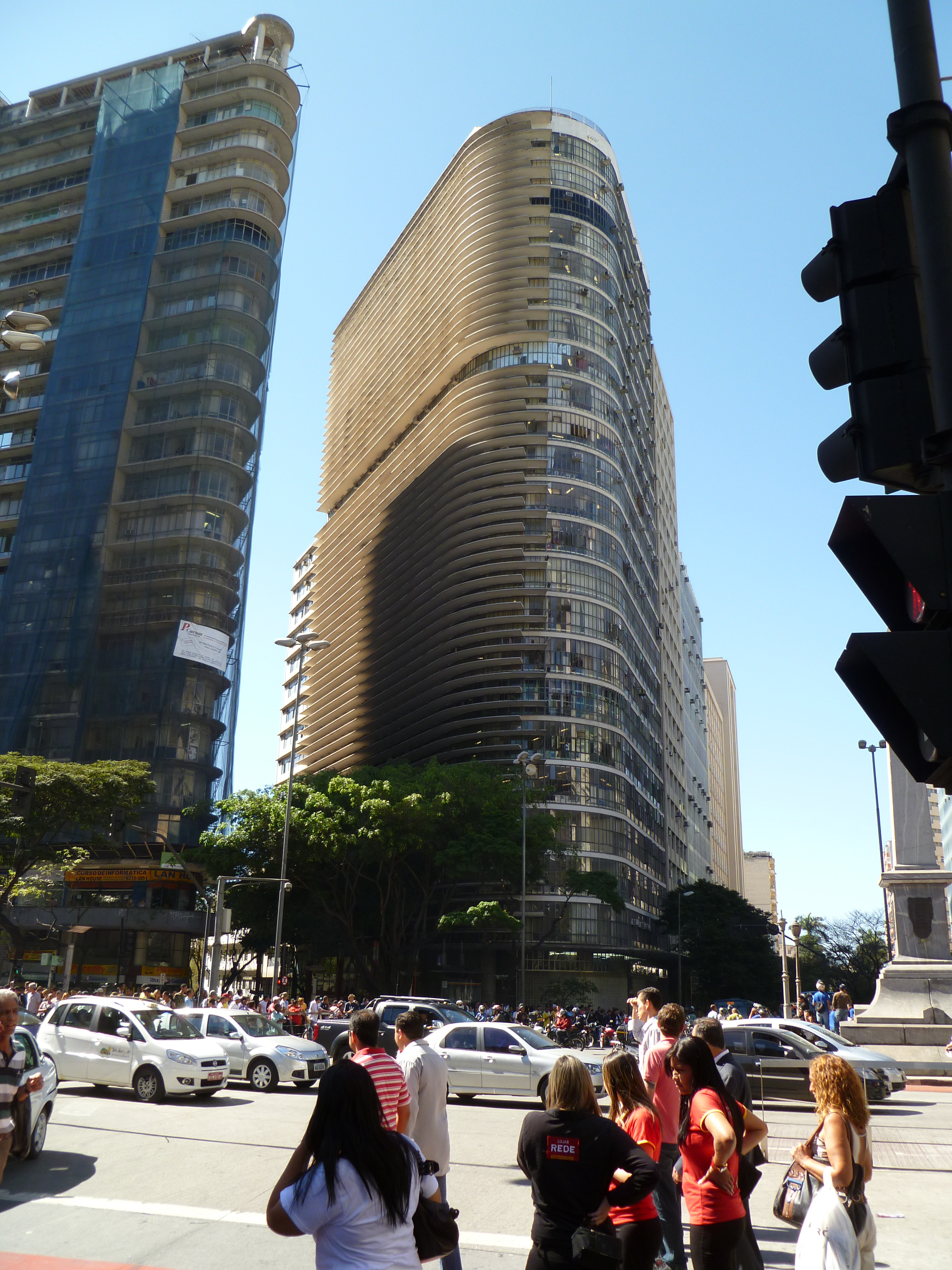
Headquarters of the Banco Mineiro da Produção, Belo Horizonte

With the success of Pampulha and the Brazil Builds exhibition, Niemeyer achieved international recognition. His architecture further developed the Brazilian style that the Saint Francis of Assisi Church and, to a lesser extent (due to its primary Corbusian language) the Ministry building, had pioneered. Works of this period shows the traditional modernist method in which form follows function, but Niemeyer's (and other Brazilian architects) handling of scale, proportion and program allowed him to resolve complex problems with simple and intelligent plans. Stamo Papadaki in his monography on Niemeyer mentioned the spatial freedom that characterized his work. The headquarters of the Banco Boavista, inaugurated in 1948 show such an approach. Dealing with a typical urban site, Niemeyer adopted creative solutions to enliven the otherwise monolithic high rise, thus challenging the predominant solidity which was the norm for bank buildings. The glazed south façade (with least insulation) reflects the 19th century Candelária Church, showing Niemeyer's sensitivity to the surroundings and older architecture. Such austere designs to high rises within urban grids can also be seen in the Edifício Montreal (1951–1954), Edifício Triângulo (1955) and the Edifício Sede do Banco Mineiro da Produção.

In 1947, Niemeyer returned to New York City to integrate the international team working on the design for the United Nations headquarters. Niemeyer's scheme 32 was approved by the Board of Design, but he eventually gave in to pressure by Le Corbusier, and together they submitted project 23/32 (developed with Bodiansky and Weissmann), which combined elements from Niemeyer's and Le Corbusier's schemes. Despite Le Corbusier's insistence to remain involved, the design was carried forward by the Director of Planning, Wallace Harrison and Max Abramovitz, then a partnership.

==== Tremaine House (unbuilt) ====
This stay in the United States also facilitated contact regarding the unbuilt Burton G. Tremaine house project, one of Niemeyer's boldest residential designs. Amidst gardens by Roberto Burle Marx, it featured an open plan in Montecito, California on the Pacific Ocean. In February–April 1949, the Museum of Modern Art exhibited From Le Corbusier to Niemeyer: Savoye House – Tremaine House 1949. According to the museum, "The theme of this show is based on Henry Russell-Hitchcock's book on the Miller Company Collection of Abstract Art, Painting toward architecture...". In 2010, Berry Bergdoll, a curator at MoMA asserted the importance of the exhibition as fusing strands of the geometric and organic soon after WWII. Hitchcock's seminal essay in the Painting toward architecture book included an illustration of Niemeyer's design, and in an associated 28-venue exhibition, Burle-Marx's Design for a garden (1948) was exhibited in several shows, as was a photo mural of Church at Pampulha.

Niemeyer produced very few designs for the United States because his affiliation to the Communist Party usually prevented him from obtaining a visa. This happened in 1946 when he was invited to teach at Yale University, when his political views cost him a visa. In 1953, at 46, Niemeyer was appointed dean of the Harvard Graduate School of Design, but because of his political views the United States government denied his visa therefore preventing him from entering the country.

In 1950 the first book about his work to be published in the United States, The Work of Oscar Niemeyer by Stamo Papadaki, was released. It was the first systematic study of his architecture, which significantly contributed to the awareness of his work abroad. It would be followed in 1956 by Oscar Niemeyer: Works in Progress, by the same author. By this time, Niemeyer was already self-confident and following his own path internationally. In 1948 Niemeyer departed from the parabolic arches he had designed in Pampulha to further explore his signature material, concrete.

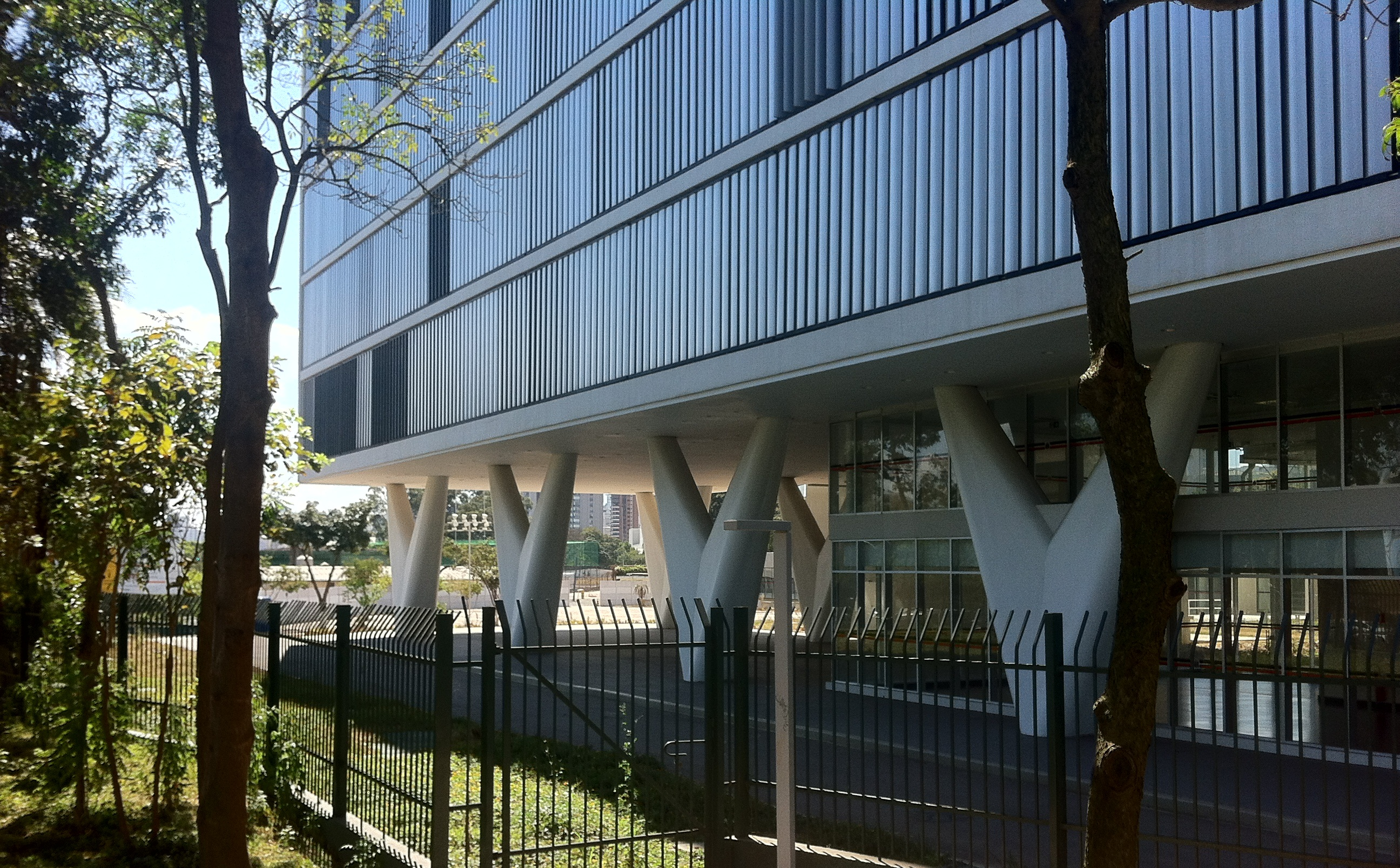
Palácio da Agricultura, current MAC USP, showing the V-shaped pilotis

Niemeyer's formal creativity has been compared to that of sculptors. In the 1950s, a time of intensive construction in Brazil produced numerous commissions. Yves Bruand stressed that Niemeyer's 1948 project for a theatre next to the Ministry of Education and Health allowed him to develop his vocabulary. In 1950 he was asked to design São Paulo's Ibirapuera Park for the city's 400th anniversary celebration. The plan, which consisted of several porticoed pavilions related via a gigantic free form marquee, had to be simplified due to cost. The resulting buildings were less interesting individually, which meant that the ensemble effect became the dominant aesthetic experience. Niemeyer developed V-shaped pilotis for the project, which became fashionable for a time. A variation on that theme was the W-shaped piloti which supports the Governador Juscelino Kubitschek housing complex (1951), two large buildings containing around 1,000 apartments. Its design was based on Niemeyer's scheme for the Quitandinha apartment hotel in Petrópolis designed one year earlier, but never realised. At 33 stories and over 400 meters long, it was to contain 5,700 living units together with communal services such as shops, schools etc., his version of Corbusier's Unité d'Habitation. A similar program was realized in the centre of São Paulo, the Copan apartment building (1953–66). This landmark represents a microcosm of the diverse population of the city. Its horizontality, which is emphasized by the concrete brise-soleil, together with the fact that it was a residential building made it an interesting approach to popular housing, given that in the 1950s suburbanization had begun and city centres were being occupied primarily by business, usually occupying vertical "masculine" buildings, as opposed to Niemeyer's "feminine" approach. In 1954 Niemeyer also designed the "Niemeyer apartment building" at the Praça da Liberdade, Belo Horizonte. The building's completely free form layout is reminiscent of Mies van der Rohe's 1922 glass skyscraper, although with a much more material feel than the airy German one. Also in 1954 as part of the same plaza Niemeyer built a library the (Biblioteca Pública Estadual).

During this period Niemeyer built several residences. Among them were a weekend house for his father, in Mendes (1949), developed from a chicken coop, the Prudente de Morais Neto house, in Rio (1943–49), based on Niemeyer's original design for Kubitschek's house in Pampulha, a house for Gustavo Capanema (1947) (the minister who commissioned the Ministry of Education and Health building), the Leonel Miranda house (1952), featuring two spiral ramps which provide access to the butterfly-roofed first floor, lifted up on oblique piloti. These houses featured the same inclined façade used in the Tremaine design, which allowed good natural lighting. In 1954 he built the famous Cavanelas house, with its tent-like metallic roof and which, with the help of Burle Marx's gardens, is perfectly adapted to its mountainous site. However, his residential (and free-form architecture) masterpiece is considered to be the 1953 Canoas House Niemeyer built for himself. The house is located on sloped terrain overlooking the ocean from afar. It comprises two floors, the first of which is under a free form roof, supported on thin metallic columns. The living quarters is located on the floor below and is more traditionally divided. The design takes advantage of the uneven terrain so that the house seems not to disturb the landscape. Although the house is extremely well-suited to its environment, it did not escape criticism. Niemeyer recalled that Walter Gropius, who was visiting the country as a jury in the second Biennial exhibition in São Paulo, argued that the house could not be mass-produced, to which Niemeyer responded that the house was designed with himself in mind and for that particular site, not a general flat one. For Henry-Russell Hitchcock, the house at Canoas was Niemeyer's most extreme lyrical statement, placing rhythm and dance as the antithesis of utility.

==== Depoimento ====
Oscar Niemeyer in 1958

In 1953 modern Brazilian architecture, which had been praised since Brazil Builds, became the target of international criticism, mainly from rationalists. Niemeyer's architecture in particular was criticised by Max Bill in an interview for Manchete Magazine. He attacked Niemeyer's use of free-form as purely decorative (as opposed to Reidy's Pedregulho housing), his use of mural panels and the individualistic character of his architecture which "is in risk of falling in a dangerous anti-social academicism". He even belittled Niemeyer's V piloti, as purely aesthetic.

Niemeyer's first response was denial, followed by a counterattack based on Bill's patronizing attitude, which prevented him from considering the differing social and economic realities of Brazil and European countries. Costa also stressed that Brazilian (and Niemeyer's) architecture was based on unskilled work which allowed for a crafted architecture based on concrete, expressing a tradition of (Brazilian) church builders, as opposed to (Swiss) clock builders.

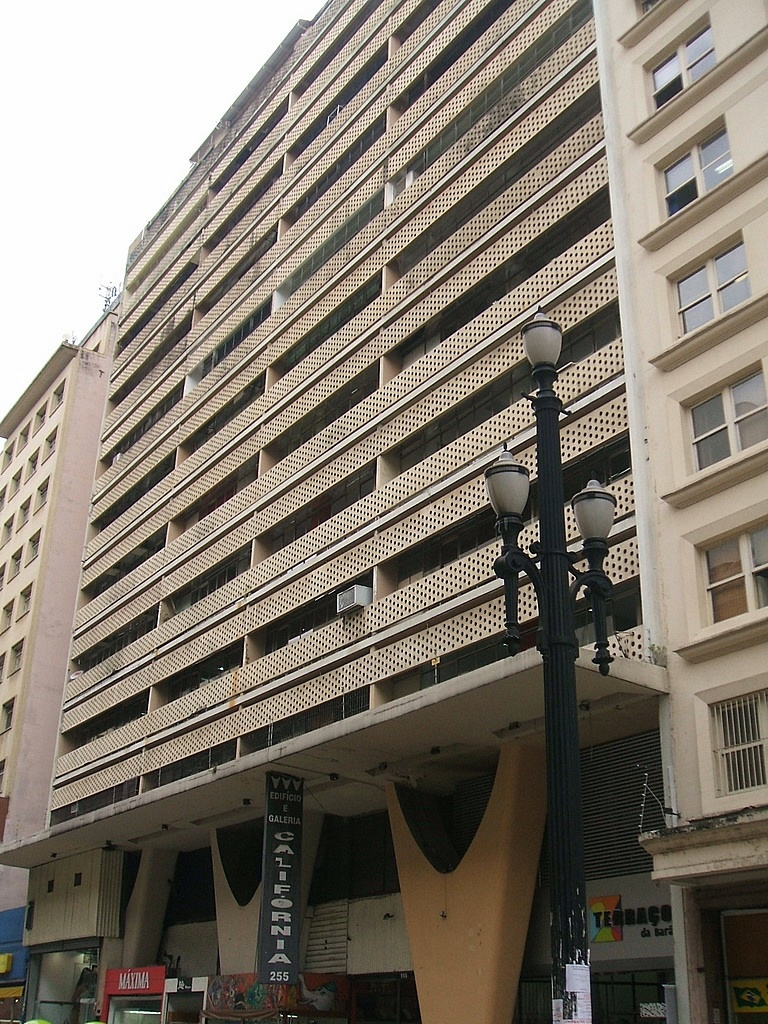
Califórnia Building (Edifício Califórnia), São Paulo

Although it was badly received and to an extent an exaggeration, Bill's words were effective in bringing to attention the mediocre architecture coming from less talented architects, who employed Niemeyer's vocabulary in the decorative fashion that Bill had criticised. Niemeyer himself admitted that for a certain period he had "handled too many commissions, executing them in a hurry, trusting the improvisational skills he believed to have". The Califórnia Building (Edifício Califórnia) in São Paulo is an example. Usually neglected by its creator, it features the V piloti which had worked so well in isolated buildings, creating a different treatment to that space without the need for two separate structural systems as Corbusier had done in Marseille. Its use in a typical urban context was formalistic and even compromised the building's structural logic in that it required many different sized supports.

Berlin's 1957 Interbau exhibition gave Niemeyer the chance to build an example of his architecture in Germany along with the chance to visit Europe for the first time. The contact with the monuments of the old world had a lasting impact on Niemeyer's views, which he now believed was completely dependent on its aesthetic qualities. Together with his own realisations of how Brazilian architecture had been harmed by untalented architects, this trip led Niemeyer to revise his approach, which he published as a text named Depoimento in his Módulo Magazine. He proposed a simplification, discarding multiple elements such as brises, sculptural piloti and marquees. His architecture from then on would be a pure expression of structure as a representation of solid volumes. His design method would also change, prioritizing aesthetic impact over programmatic functions, given that for him "when form creates beauty, it has in beauty itself its justification".

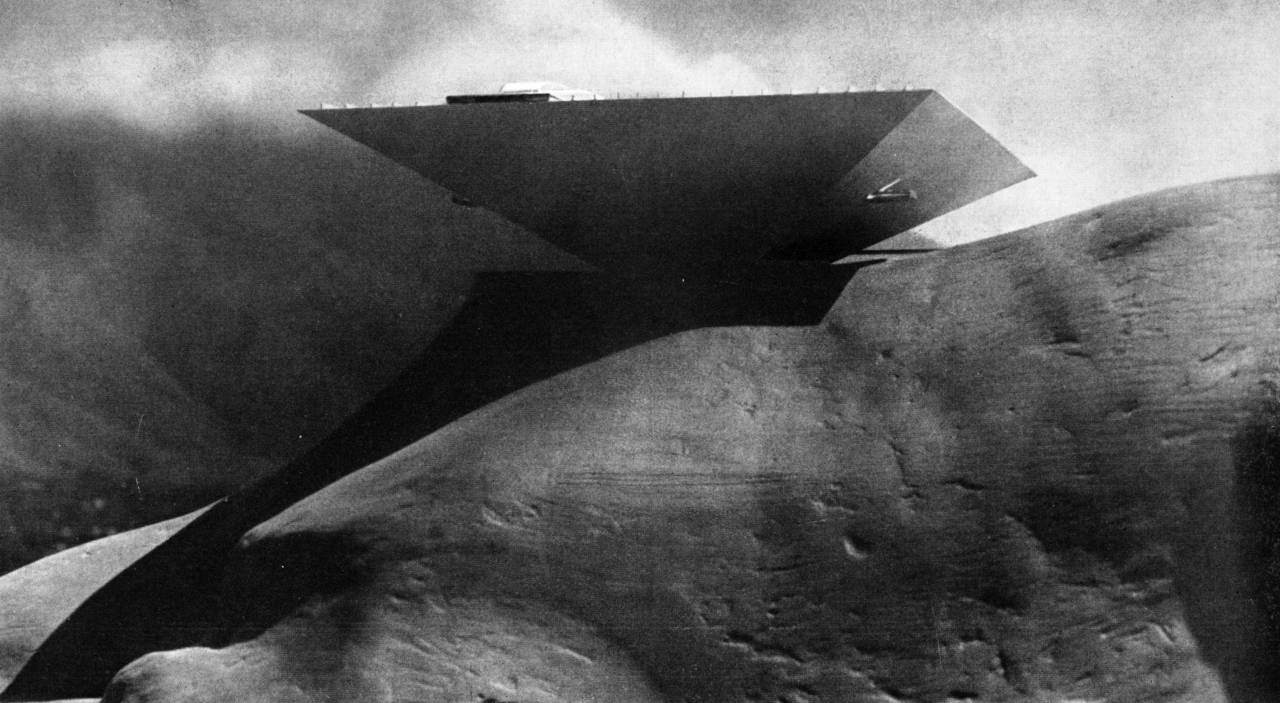
Model of the Museum of Modern Art in Caracas

In 1955, at 48, Niemeyer designed the Museum of Modern Art in Caracas. The design of this museum was the material realization of his work revision. Meant to rise from the top of a cliff overlooking central Caracas, the museum had an inverted pyramid shape which dominated and overpowered its surroundings. The opaque prismatic building had almost no connection to the outside through its walls, although its glass ceiling allowed natural light to enter. An electronic system was used to keep lighting conditions unchanged throughout the day using artificial light to complement it. The interior, however, was more recognizably done in Niemeyer's mode, with cat-walk ramps linking the different levels and the mezzanine made as a free-form slab hung from ceiling beams.

This aesthetic simplicity would culminate in his work in Brasília, where the qualities of the buildings are expressed by their structural elements alone.

=== Design of Brasília ===
Juscelino Kubitschek visited Niemeyer at the Canoas House in September 1956, soon after he assumed the Brazilian presidency. While driving back to the city, the politician spoke to the architect about his most audacious scheme: "I am going to build a new capital for this country and I want you to help me [...] Oscar, this time we are going to build the capital of Brazil."

Niemeyer organized a competition for the lay-out of Brasília, the new capital, and the winner was the project of his old master and great friend, Lúcio Costa. Niemeyer would design the buildings, Lúcio the layout of the city.

In the space of a few months, Niemeyer designed residential, commercial and government buildings. Among them were the residence of the President (Palácio da Alvorada), the chamber of deputies, the National Congress of Brazil, the Cathedral of Brasília (a hyperboloid structure), diverse ministries. Viewed from above, the city can be seen to have elements that repeat themselves in every building, achieving a formal unity.

Behind the construction of Brasília lay a monumental campaign to construct an entire city in the barren center of the country, hundreds of kilometers from any major city. The brainchild of Kubitschek, Niemeyer had as aims included stimulating industry, integrating the country's distant areas, populating inhospitable regions and bringing progress to a region where only cattle ranching then existed. Niemeyer and Costa used it to test new concepts of city planning: streets without traffic, buildings floating off the ground supported by columns and allowing the space underneath to be free and integrated with nature.

The project adopted a socialist ideology: in Brasília all the apartments would be owned by the government and rented to employees. Brasília did not have "nobler" regions, meaning that top ministers and common laborers would share the same building. Many of these concepts were ignored or changed by other presidents with different visions in later years. Brasília was designed, constructed, and inaugurated within four years. After its completion, Niemeyer was appointed coordinator of the School of Architecture of the University of Brasília. In 1963, he became an honorary member of the American Institute of Architects in the United States; the same year, he received the Lenin Peace Prize from the USSR.

Niemeyer and his contribution to the construction of Brasília are portrayed in the 1964 French film L'homme de Rio (The Man from Rio), starring Jean-Paul Belmondo.

In 1964, at 57, after being invited by Abba Hushi, the mayor of Haifa, Israel, to plan the campus of the University of Haifa on Mount Carmel, he came back to a completely different Brazil. In March President João Goulart, who succeeded President Jânio Quadros in 1961, was deposed in a military coup. General Castelo Branco assumed command of the country, which would remain a dictatorship until 1985.

In 1987, Brasília was inscribed as a UNESCO World Heritage Site. Niemeyer is the first person to have received such recognition for one of his works during his lifetime.

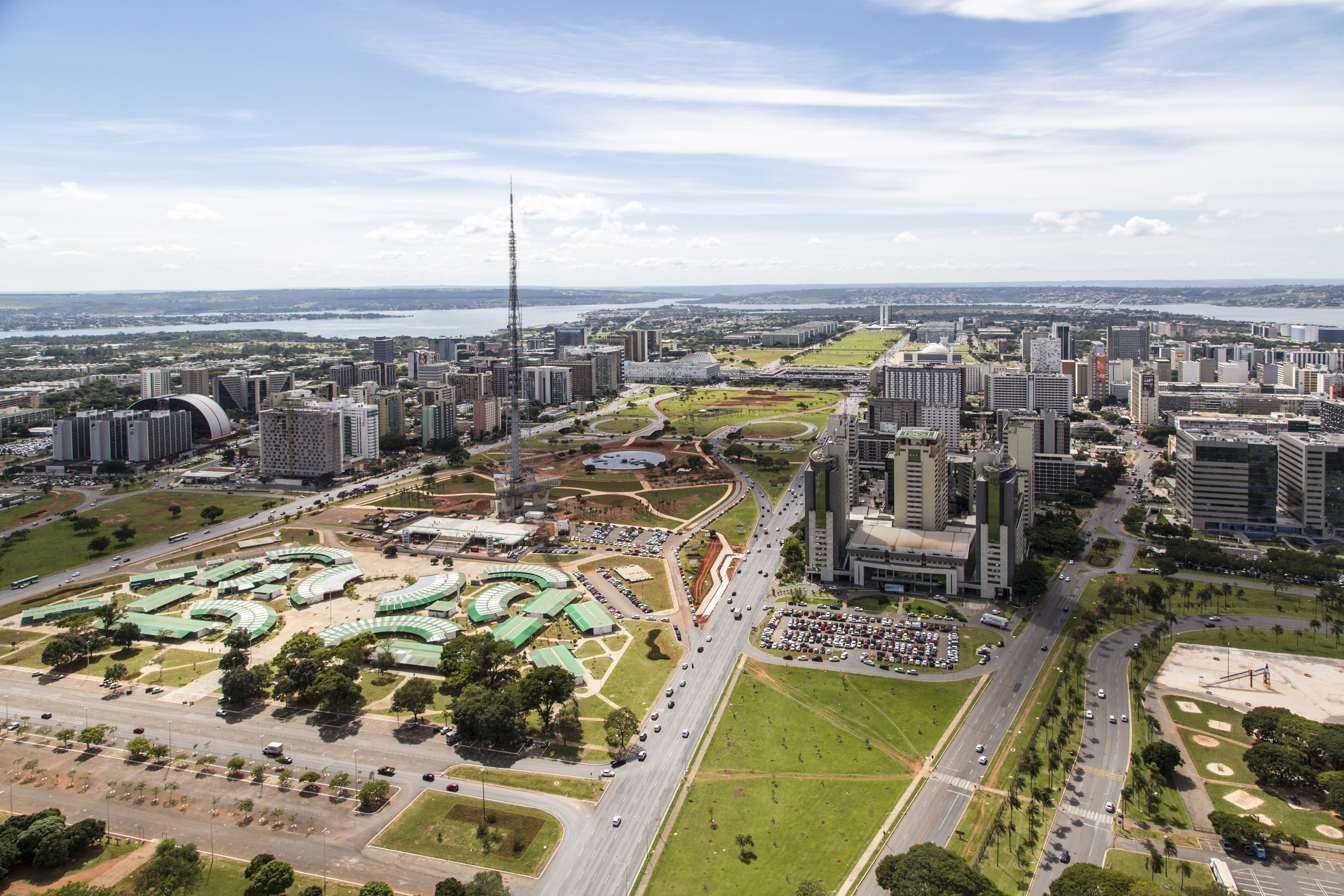
Monumental Axis

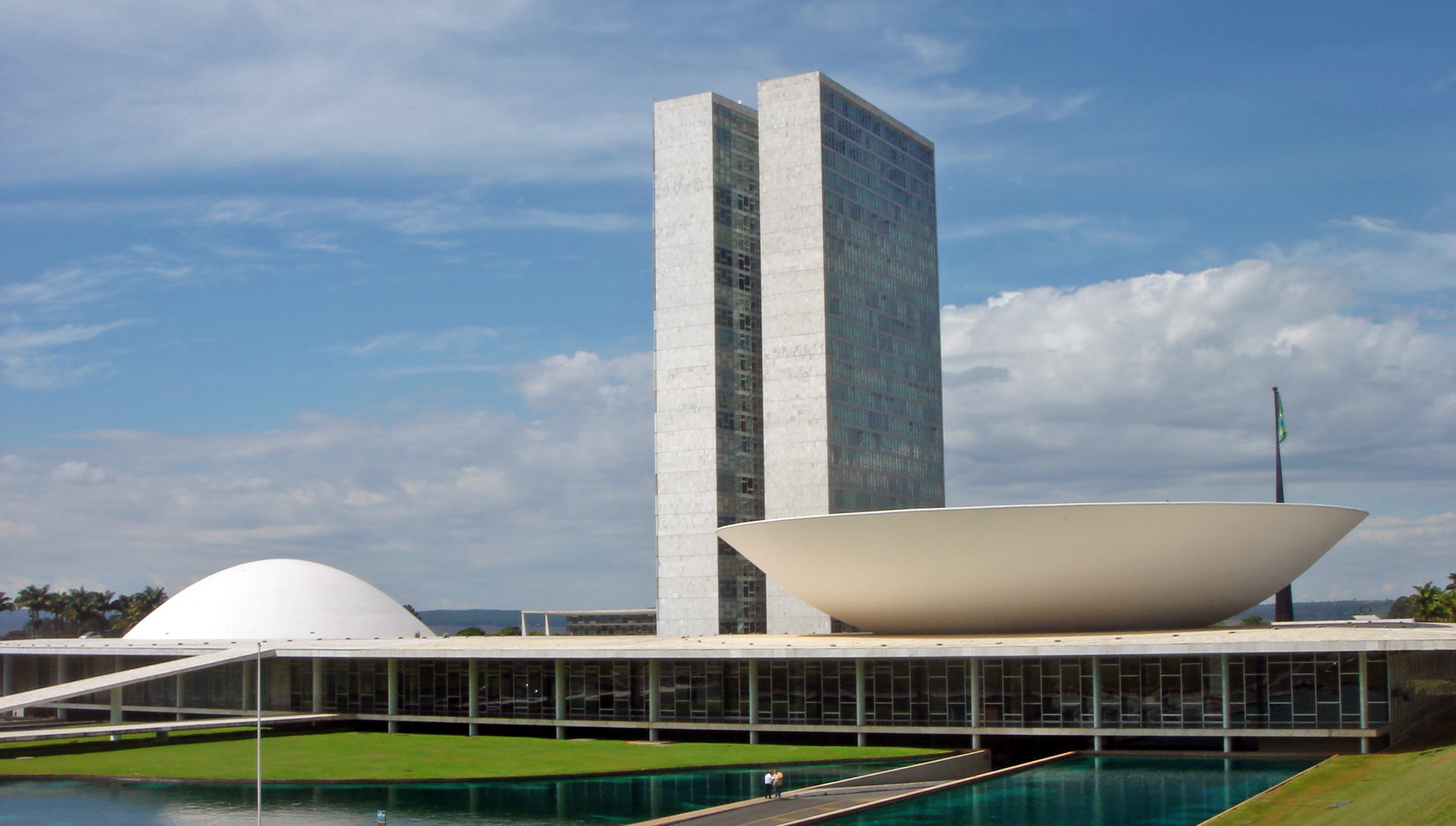
National Congress of Brazil

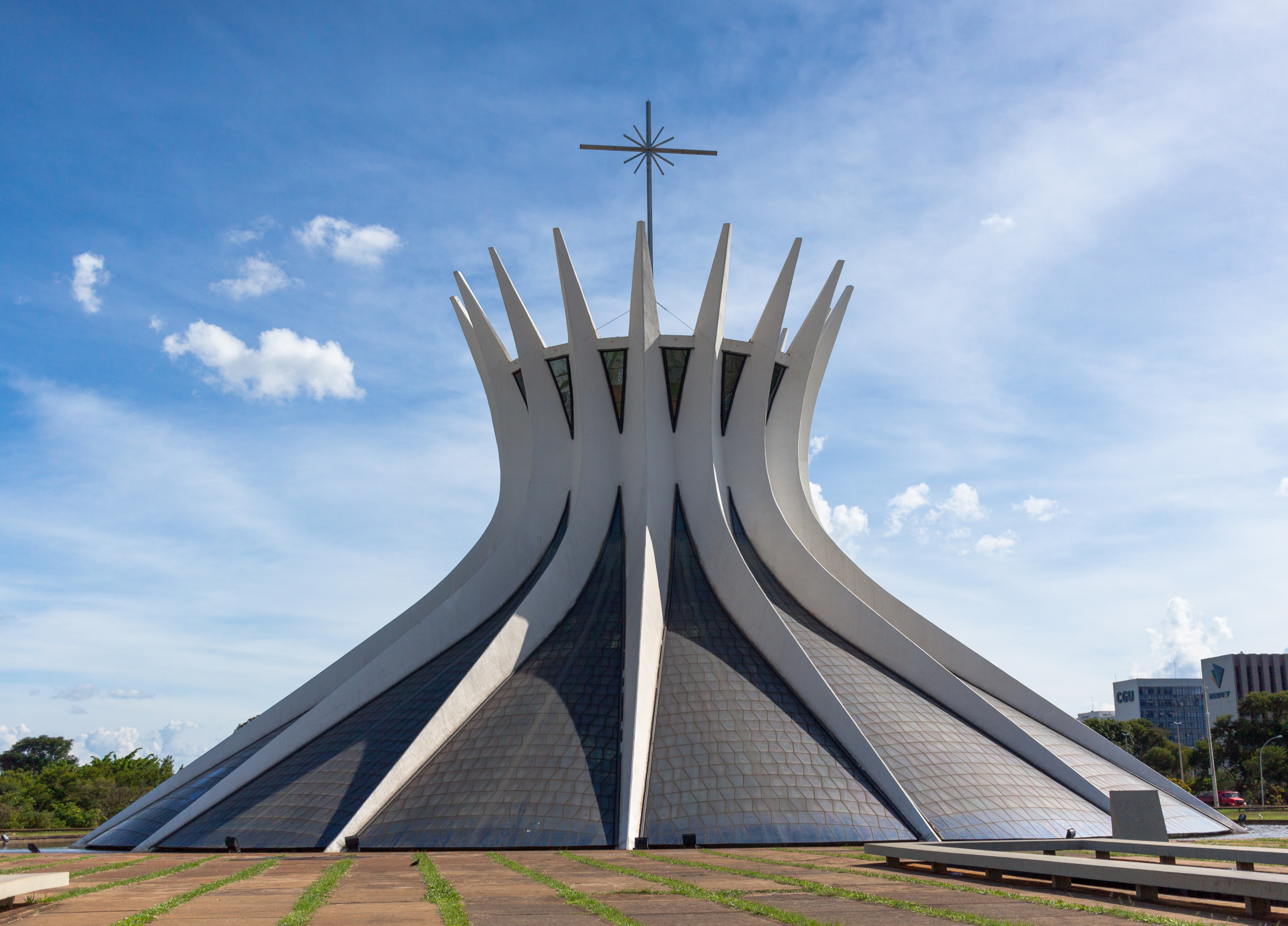
Cathedral of Brasília

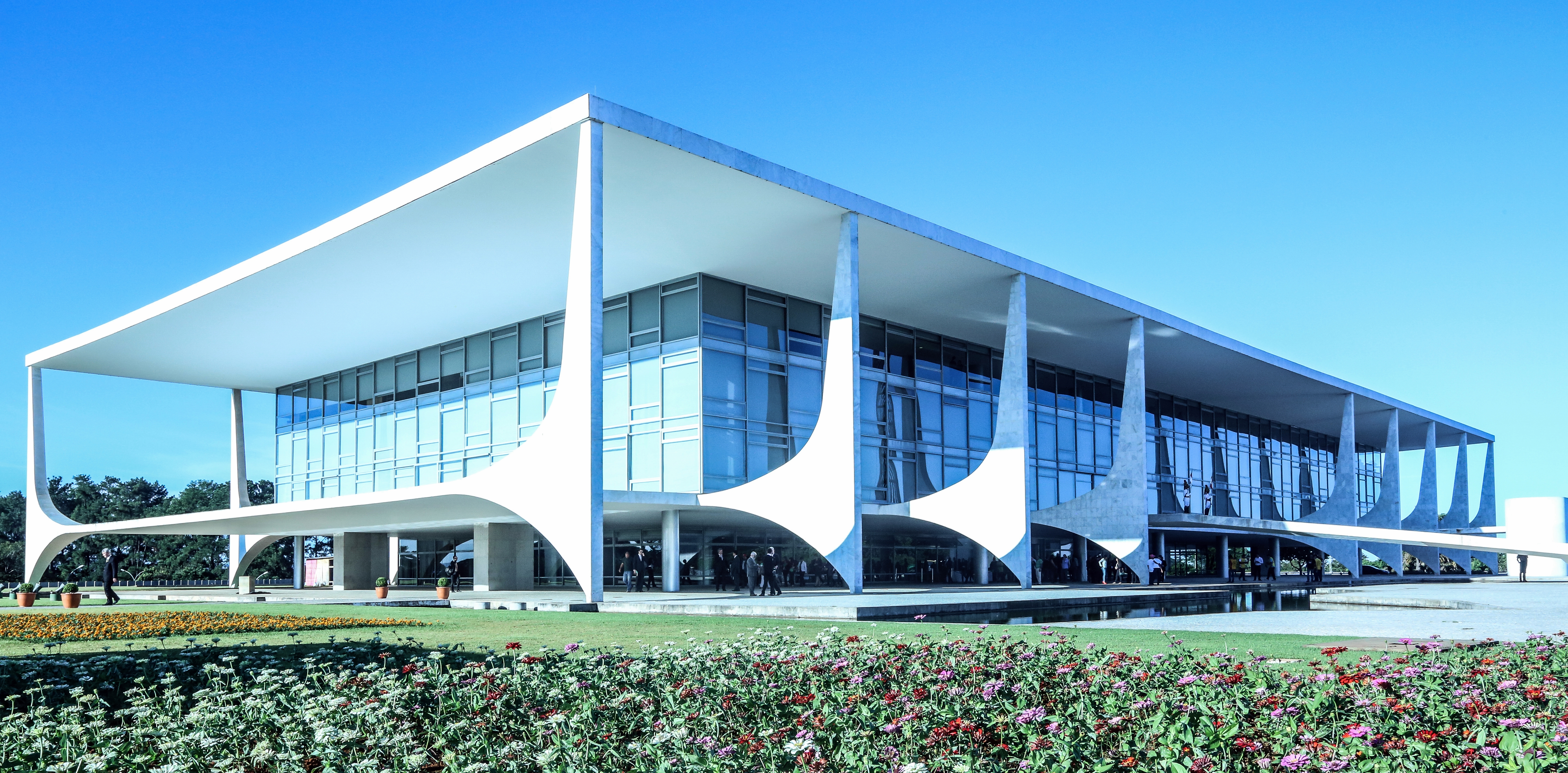
Palácio do Planalto

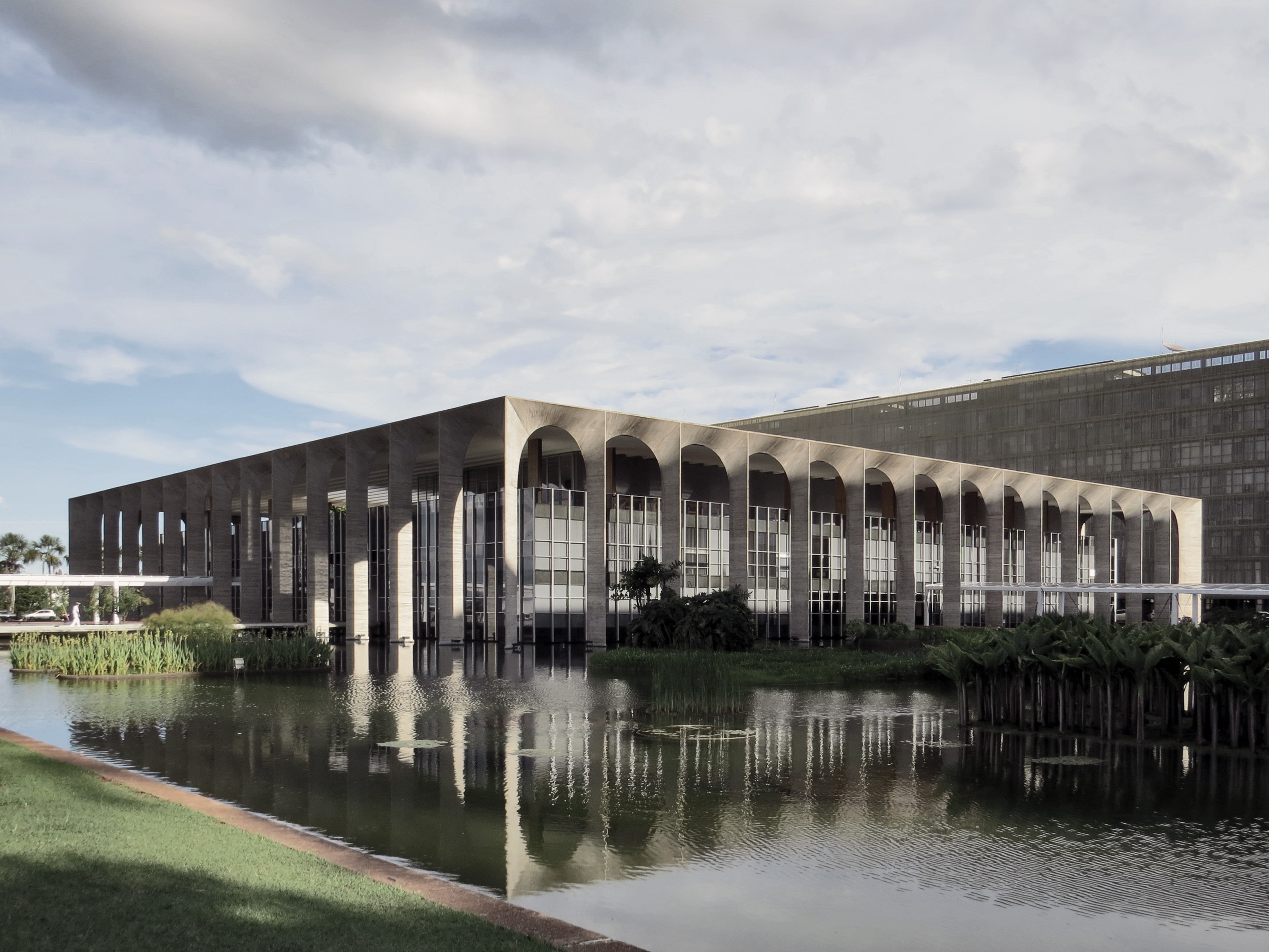
Itamaraty Palace

=== Exile and projects overseas ===
Niemeyer's politics cost him during the military dictatorship. His office was pillaged, the headquarters of the magazine he coordinated were destroyed and clients disappeared. In 1965, two hundred professors, Niemeyer among them, resigned from the University of Brasília, to protest against the government's treatment of universities. In the same year he traveled to France for an exhibition in the Louvre.

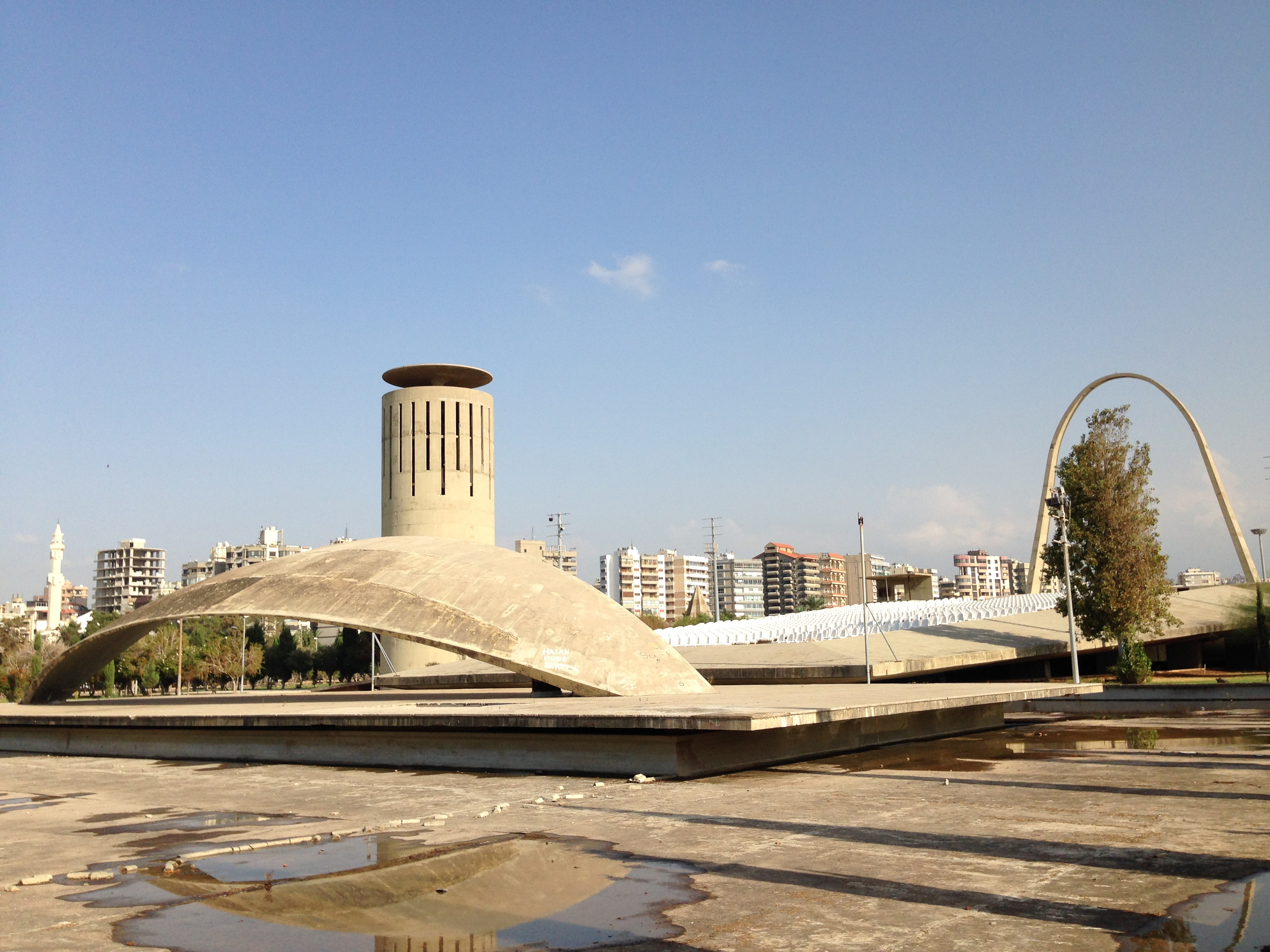
The unfinished project of Rashid Karami International Fair in Tripoli, Lebanon was declared a UNESCO world heritage site in 2023

The following year, Niemeyer moved to Paris. In 1962 he visited Tripoli, Lebanon to design the International Permanent Exhibition Centre. Despite completing construction, the start of the civil war in 1975 in Lebanon disrupted its launch.

He opened an office on the Champs-Élysées and found customers in diverse countries, especially in Algeria where he designed the University of Science and Technology-Houari Boumediene. In Paris he created the Headquarters of the French Communist Party, Place du Colonel Fabien, and in Italy that of the Mondadori publishing company. In Funchal on Madeira, he designed a casino. He worked through the mail with architects based in California in the United States to build a house for Anne and Joseph Strick in Santa Monica, as well as the "Beauty Pavillion" for plastic surgeon Dr. Robert Alan Franklyn on Sunset Boulevard in West Hollywood. Since 1995, it has been the home of Mark Mothersbaugh's Mutato Muzika production office.

While in Paris, Niemeyer began designing furniture that was produced by Mobilier International. He created an easy chair and ottoman composed of bent steel and leather in limited numbers for private clients. Later, in 1978, this chair and other designs, including the "Rio" chaise-longue were produced in Brazil by Tendo company, then Tendo Brasileira. The easy chairs and ottomans were made of bent wood and were placed in Communist party headquarters around the world. Much like his architecture, Niemeyer's furniture designs evoked the beauty of Brazil, with curves mimicking the female form and the hills of Rio de Janeiro.

=== Later life and death ===
The Brazilian dictatorship lasted until 1985. Under João Figueiredo's rule it softened and gradually turned towards democracy. At this time Niemeyer returned to his country. During the 1980s, he made the Memorial Juscelino Kubitschek (1980), the Pantheon (Panteão da Pátria e da Liberdade Tancredo Neves, 1985) and the Latin America Memorial (1987) (described by The Independent of London to be "an incoherent and vulgar construction"). The memorial sculpture represents a wounded hand, whose wound bleeds in the shape of Central and South America. In 1988, at 81, Niemeyer was awarded the Pritzker Architecture Prize, architecture's most prestigious award. From 1992 to 1996, Niemeyer was the president of the Brazilian Communist Party (PCB). As a lifelong activist, Niemeyer was a powerful public figure who could be linked to the party at a time when it appeared to be in its death throes after the USSR's demise. Although not politically active, his image helped the party survive its crisis, after the 1992 split and to remain as a political force on the national scene, which eventually led to its renewal. He was replaced by Zuleide Faria de Mello in 1996. He designed at least two more buildings in Brasília, the Memorial dos Povos Indigenas ("Memorial for the Indigenous People") and the Catedral Militar, Igreja de N.S. da Paz. In 1996, at the age of 89, he was responsible for the design of the Niterói Contemporary Art Museum in Niterói, a city next to Rio de Janeiro. The building cantilevers out from a sheer rock face, offering a view of Guanabara Bay and the city of Rio de Janeiro.

Niemeyer maintained his studio in Rio de Janeiro into the 21st century. In 2002, the Oscar Niemeyer Museum complex was inaugurated in the city of Curitiba, Paraná. In 2003, at 96, Niemeyer was called to design the Serpentine Gallery Summer Pavilion in Hyde Park, London, a gallery that each year invites a famous architect, who has never previously built in the UK, to design this temporary structure. He was still involved in diverse projects at the age of 100, mainly sculptures and adjustments of previous works. On Niemeyer's 100th birthday, Russia's president Vladimir Putin awarded him the Order of Friendship.

Grateful for the Prince of Asturias Award of Arts received in 1989, he collaborated on the 25th anniversary of the award with the donation to Asturias of the design of a cultural centre. The Oscar Niemeyer International Cultural Centre (also known in Spain as Centro Niemeyer), is located in Avilés and was inaugurated in 2011. In January 2010, the Auditorium Oscar Niemeyer Ravello was officially opened in Ravello, Italy, on the Amalfi Coast. The Auditorium's concept design, drawings, model, sketches and text were made by Niemeyer in 2000 and completed under the guidance of his friend, Italian sociologist Domenico de Masi. The project was delayed for several years due to objections arising from its design, siting, and clear difference from the local architecture; since its inauguration the project has experienced problems and was closed for a year.

Starting in 2002, Niemeyer and lighting designer Peter Gasper reformulated the lighting of several of Brasília's most iconic buildings. The projects for buildings in Brasília often featured lighting design by Peter Gasper, with whom Niemeyer had a working relationship.

After reaching 100, Niemeyer was regularly hospitalized. In 2009, after a four-week hospitalization for the treatment of gallstones and an intestinal tumour, he was quoted as saying that hospitalization is a "very lonely thing; I needed to keep busy, keep in touch with friends, maintain my rhythm of life." In 2011, Niemeyer was commissioned to complete what would be his final design - the Oscar Niemeyer Sphere - to house part of a canteen in an industrial estate in Leipzig. His daughter and only child, Anna Maria, died of emphysema in June 2012, aged 82. Niemeyer died of cardiorespiratory arrest on 5 December 2012, at the Hospital Samaritano in Rio de Janeiro. The following day a memorial service was held in the presidential palace in Brasilia. He had been hospitalised with a respiratory infection prior to his death.

The BBC's obituary of Niemeyer stated that he "built some of the world's most striking buildings – monumental, curving concrete and glass structures which almost defy description", describing him as "one of the most innovative and daring architects of the last 60 years". The Washington Post said he was "widely regarded as the foremost Latin American architect of the last century".

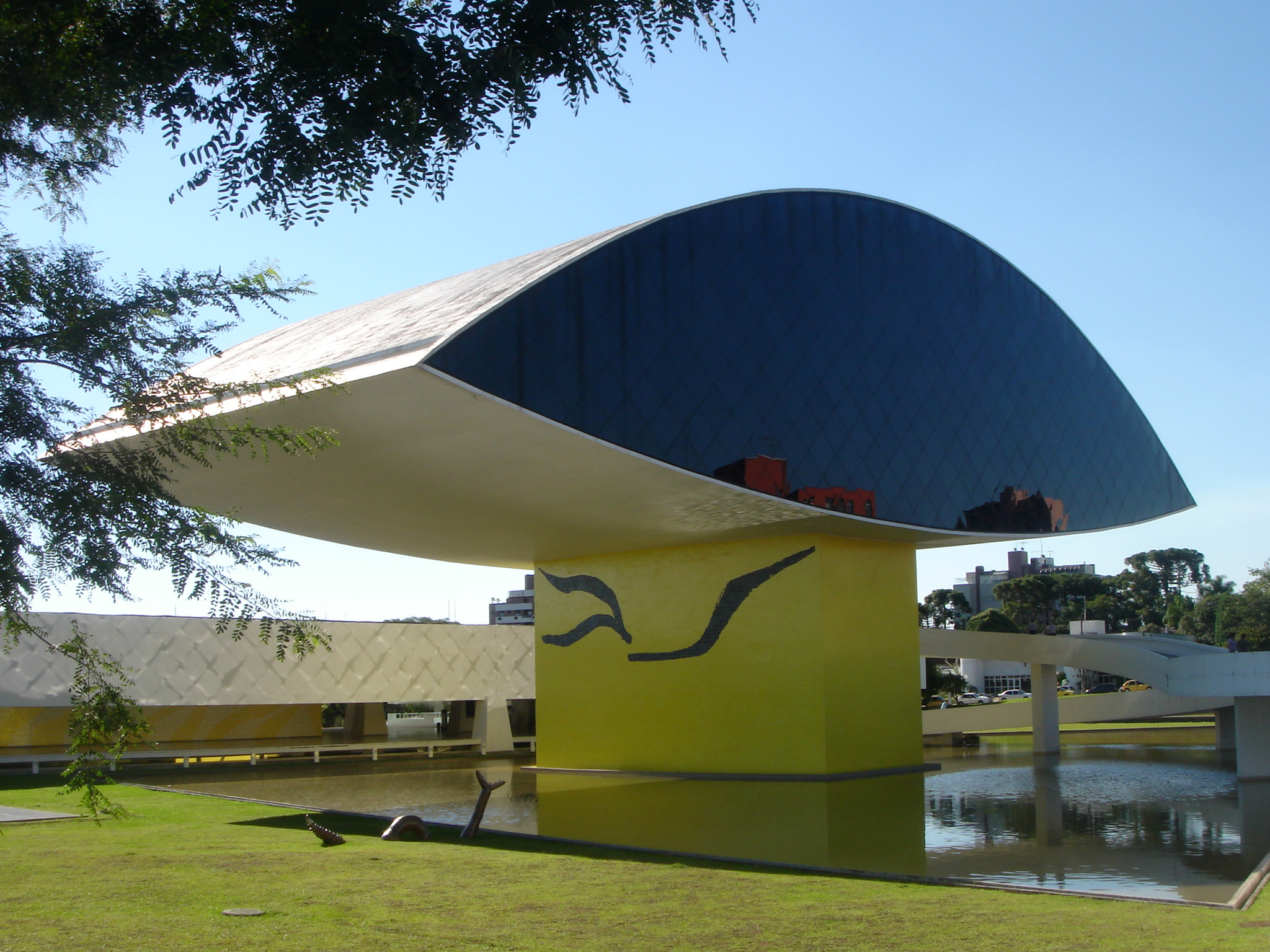
Oscar Niemeyer Museum, Curitiba, Brazil

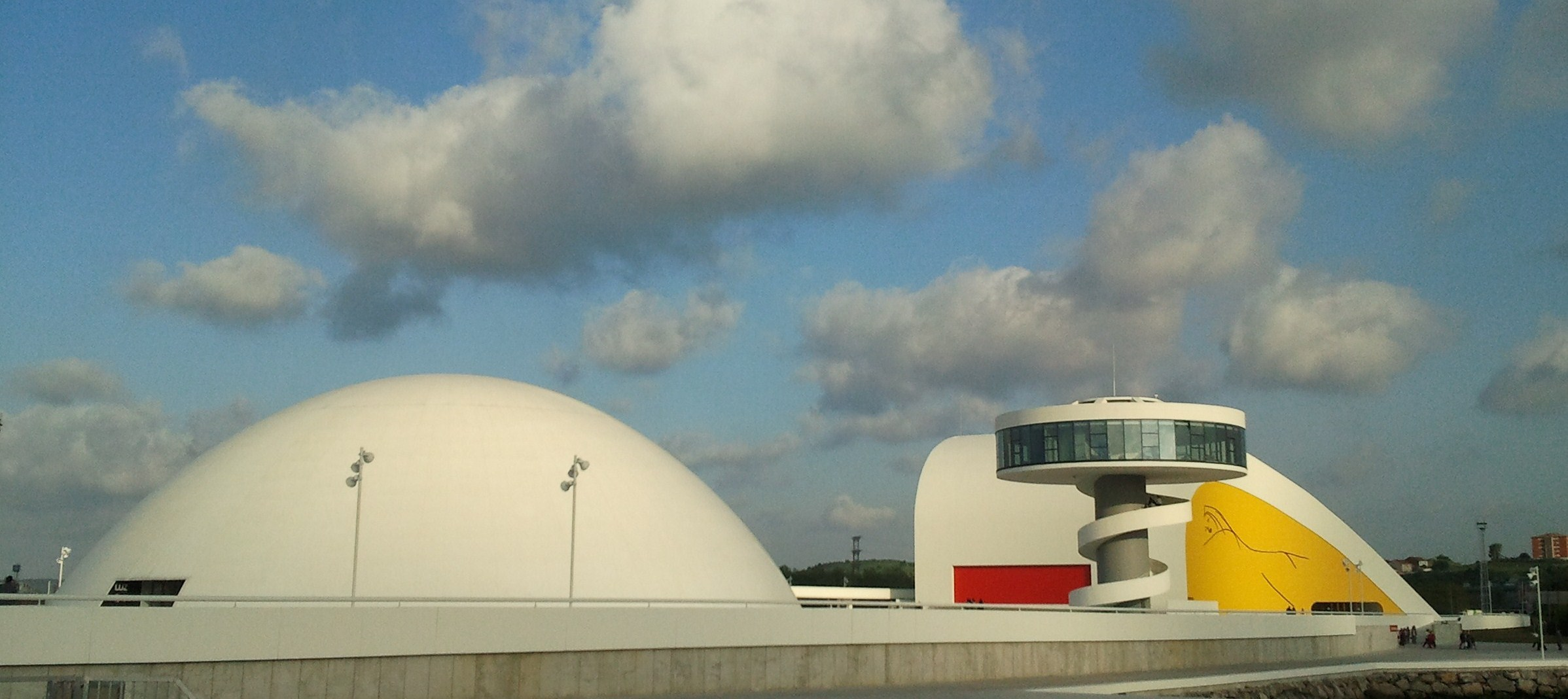
Oscar Niemeyer International Cultural Centre, Asturias, Spain

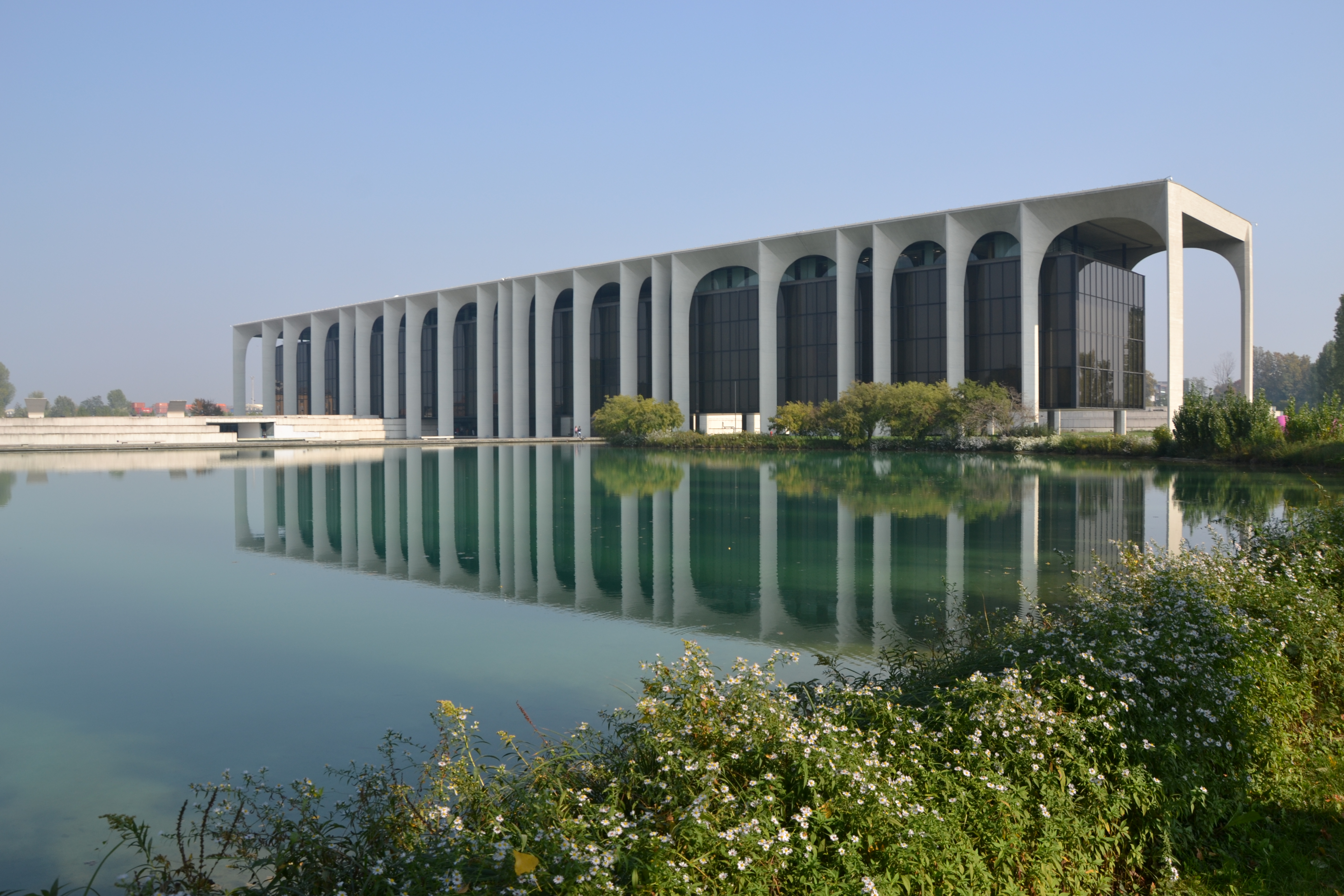
Mondadori Palace Milan, Italy

Headquarters of the French Communist Party, Paris, France

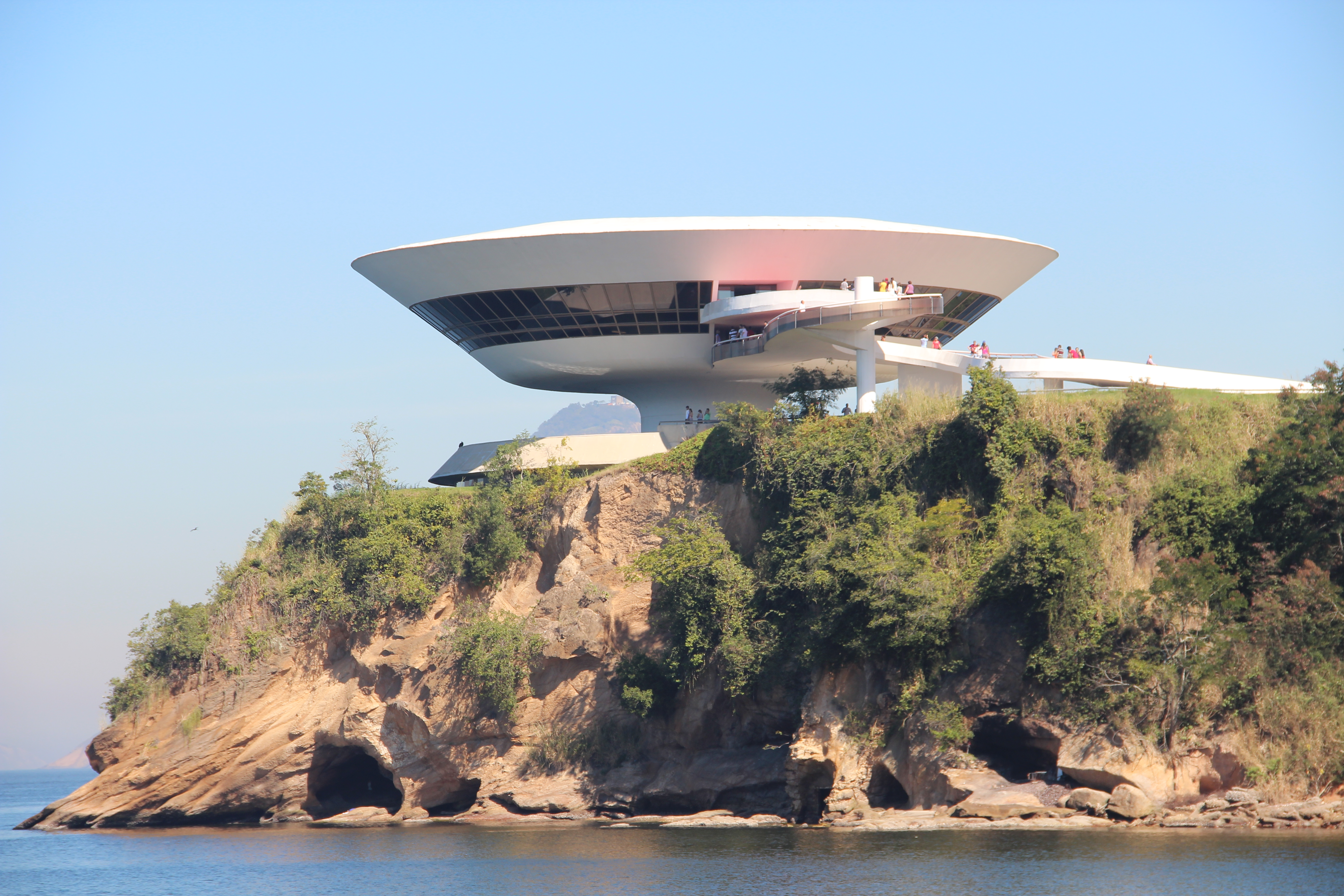
Niterói Contemporary Art Museum, Brazil

== Personal life ==
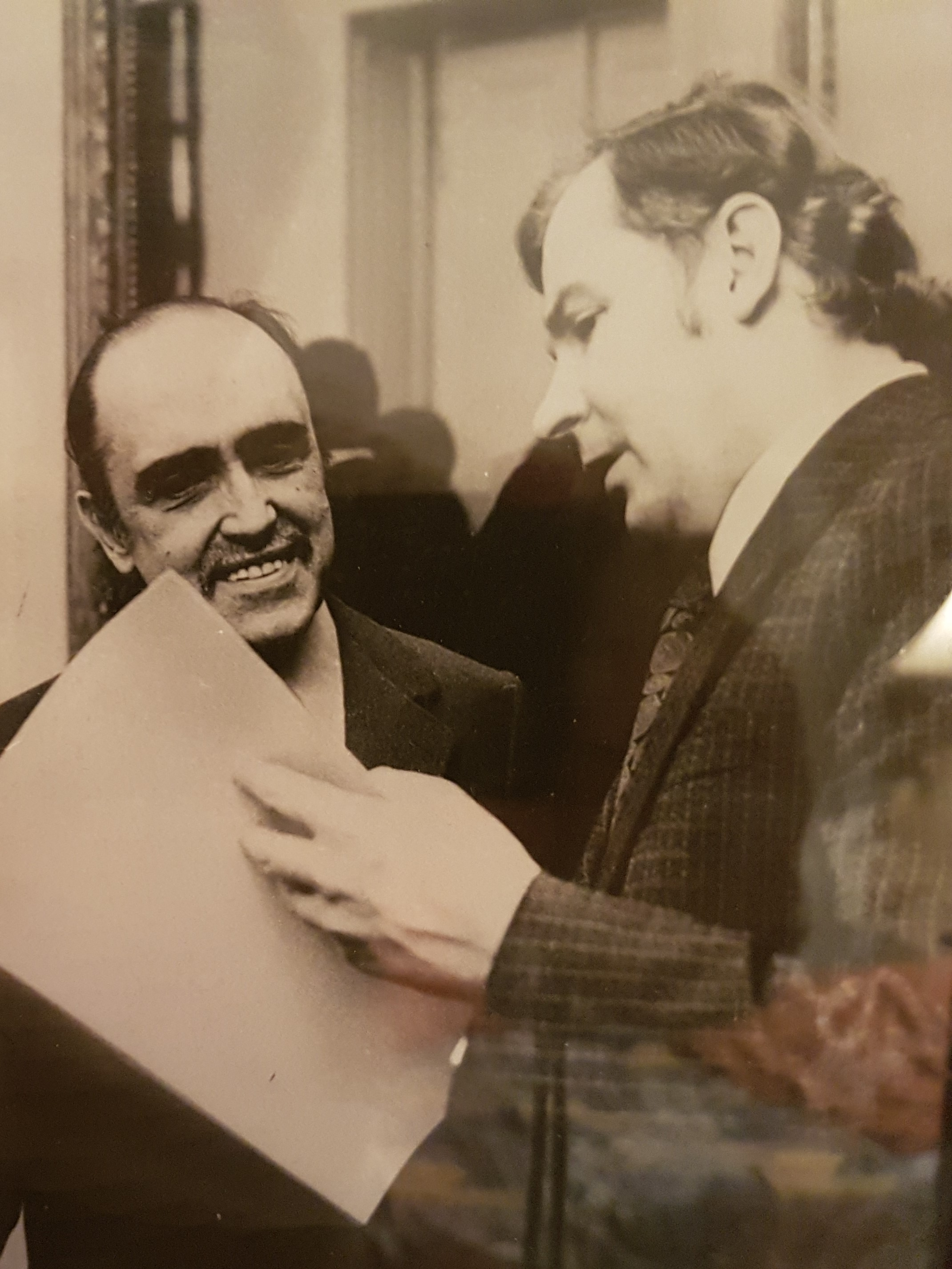
Oscar Niemeyer with Polish architect Jerzy Świech

Niemeyer married Annita Baldo in 1928. They had one daughter, Anna Maria, in 1929 (she predeceased her father on June 6, 2012). Niemeyer subsequently had five grandchildren, thirteen great-grandchildren, and seven great-great-grandchildren. Annita died in 2004, at 93, after 76 years of marriage. In 2006, shortly before his 99th birthday, Niemeyer married for the second time, to his longtime secretary Vera Lucia Cabreira at his apartment, a month after he had fractured his hip in a fall.

Oscar Niemeyer was a keen smoker of cigars, smoking more in later life. His architectural studio was a smoking zone.

=== Political and religious views ===
Niemeyer had a left-wing political ideology. In 1945, many communist militants who were arrested under the Vargas' dictatorship were released, and Niemeyer sheltered some of them at his office. He met Luís Carlos Prestes, perhaps the most important left-winger in Brazil. After several weeks, he gave up the house to Prestes and his supporters, who founded the Brazilian Communist Party. Niemeyer joined the party in 1945 and became its president in 1992.

During the military dictatorship of Brazil his office was raided and he was forced into exile in Europe. The Minister of Aeronautics of the time reportedly said that "the place for a communist architect is Moscow." He subsequently visited the Soviet Union, meeting with a number of the country's leaders, and in 1963 was awarded the Lenin Peace Prize. Niemeyer was a close friend of Fidel Castro, who often visited his apartment and studio in Brazil. Castro was once quoted as saying "Niemeyer and I are the last communists on this planet." Niemeyer was regularly visited by Hugo Chávez.

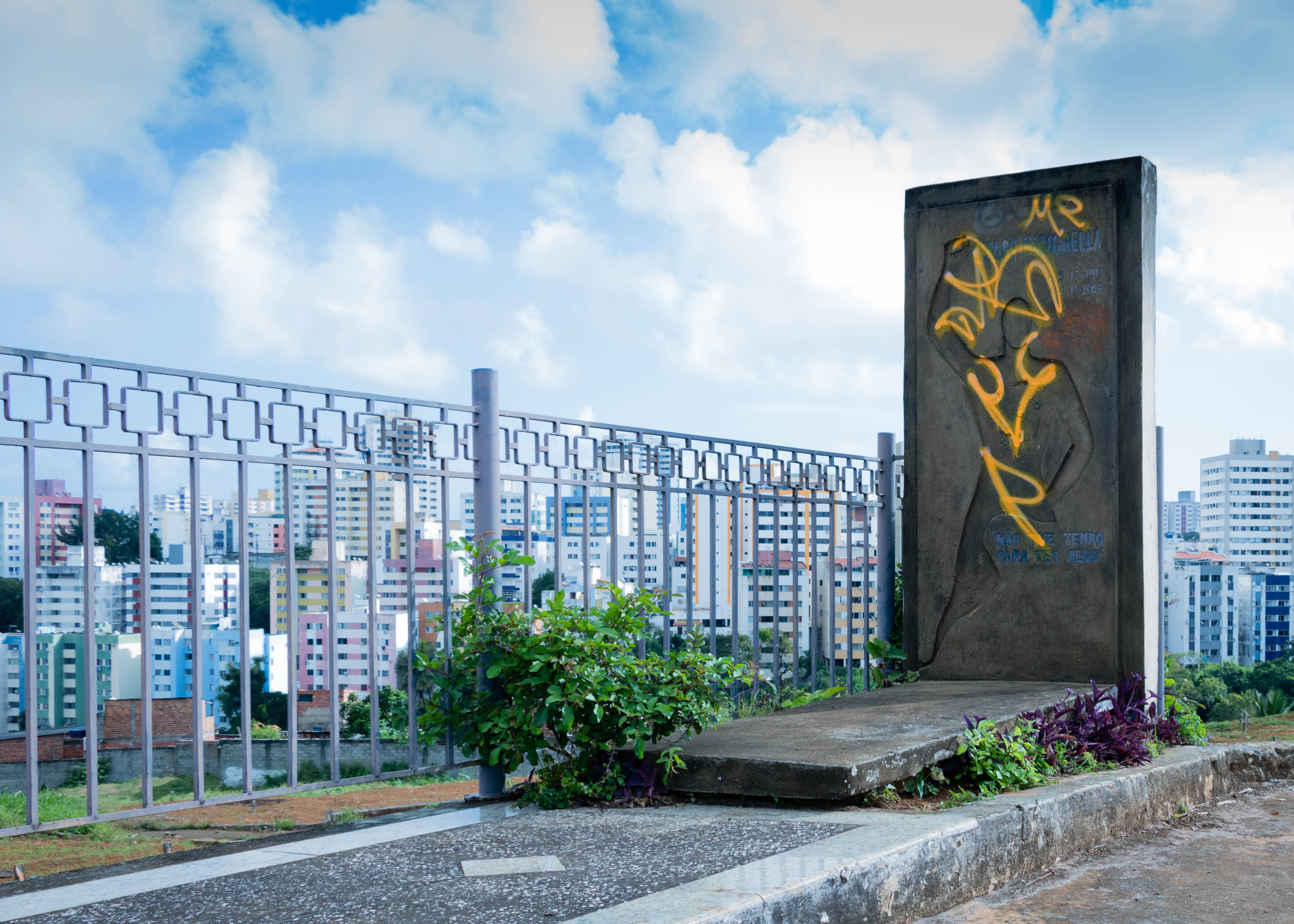
Tombstone of Carlos Marighella, Marxist guerrilla theorist assassinated by the police during the Military dictatorship. (Made by Oscar Niemeyer in 2009.)

Some critics pointed out that Niemeyer's architecture was often in opposition to his views. His first major work, the Church of Saint Francis of Assisi, informally known also as the Church of Pampulha, had a bourgeois character and Brasília was famous for its palaces. Niemeyer never saw architecture in the same way as Walter Gropius, who defended a rational and industrial architecture capable of molding society to make it suitable for the new industrial era. Skeptical about architecture's ability to change an "unjust society", Niemeyer defended that such activism should be undertaken politically. Using architecture for such purposes would be anti-modern (as it would be limiting constructive technology). Niemeyer says: "Our concern is political too – to change the world ... Architecture is my work, and I've spent my whole life at a drawing board, but life is more important than architecture. What matters is to improve human beings."

Niemeyer was a lifelong atheist, basing his beliefs both on the "injustices of this world" and on cosmological principles: "It's a fantastic Universe which humiliates us, and we can't make any use of it. But we are amazed by the power of the human mind … in the end, that's it—you are born, you die, that's it!". Such views never stopped him from designing religious buildings, which included small Catholic chapels, huge Orthodox churches and large mosques. He also catered to the spiritual beliefs of the public who facilitated his religious buildings. In the Cathedral of Brasília, he intended for the large glass windows "to connect the people to the sky, where their Lord's paradise is."

He was one of the signatories of the agreement to convene a convention for drafting a world constitution. As a result, for the first time in human history, a World Constituent Assembly convened to draft and adopt a Constitution for the Federation of Earth.

== Criticism ==
Nicolai Ouroussoff, the architecture critic of The New York Times, published an article asking whether Niemeyer's last work had been affected by advanced age. Ouroussoff found the "Niterói Contemporary Art Museum" to be of significantly lower quality than the architect's earlier works. He argued that "the greatest threat to Mr. Niemeyer's remarkable legacy may not be the developer's bulldozer or insensitive city planners, but Mr. Niemeyer himself." He considers iconic works at "Esplanada dos Ministérios" to "have been marred by the architect's own hand."

== Legacy ==
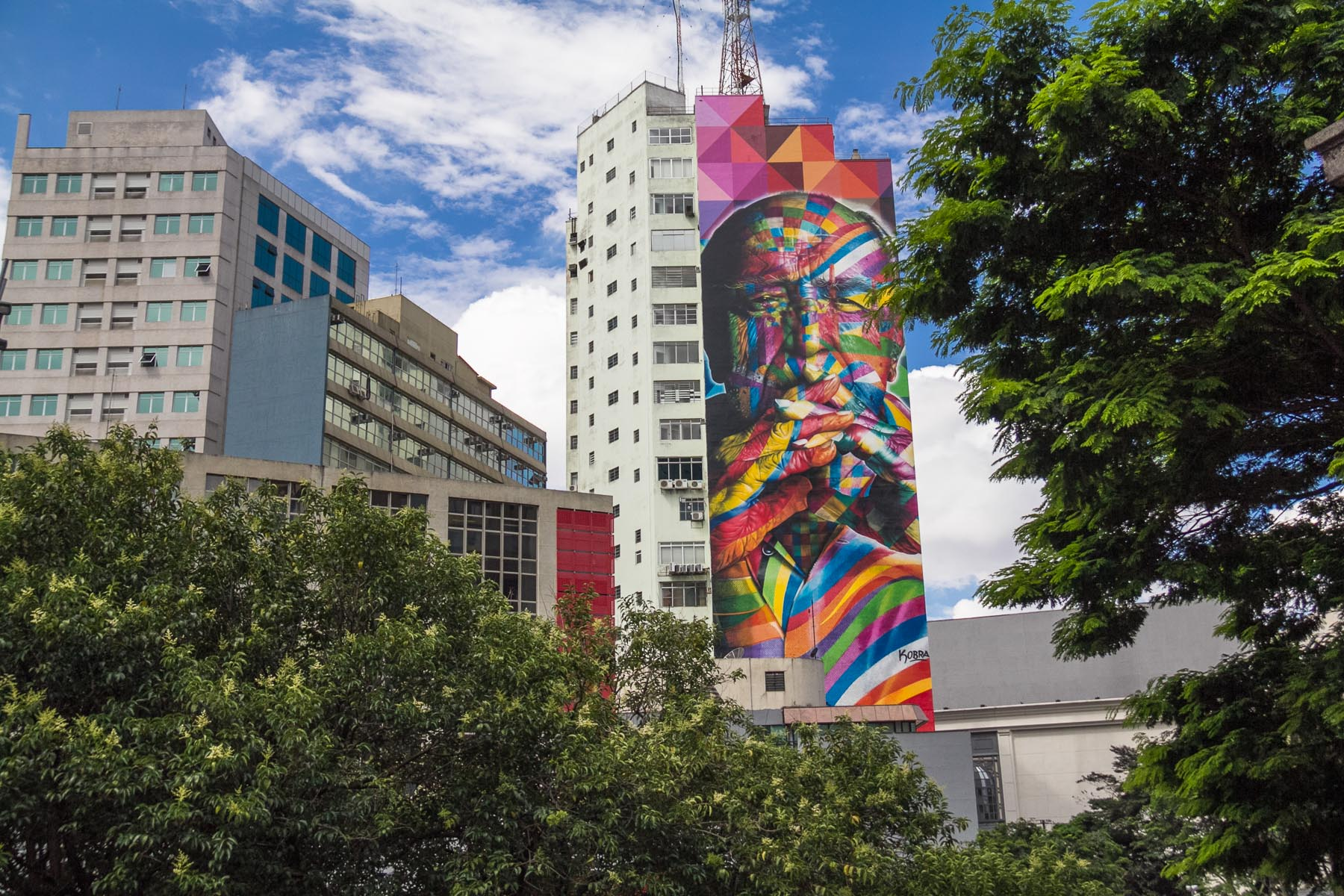
Mural honoring Niemeyer in São Paulo, Brazil.

Since 1984 the Rio de Janeiro carnival parade is held in the Sambadrome designed by Oscar Niemeyer. In 2003 the Unidos de Vila Isabel Samba School celebrated the life of Niemeyer in their carnival parade. It was the first time that Vila Isabel paid tribute to a living historical figure. The parade's theme song – O Arquiteto no Recanto da Princesa – was composed by the Brazilian singer Martinho da Vila.

Oscar Niemeyer's projects have also been a major source of inspiration for the French painter Jacques Benoit. In 2006 Benoit presented in Paris a series of paintings entitled Three Traces of Oscar, paying tribute to the legacy of Niemeyer in France. In 2010 the Brasília Jubilee Commission chose Benoit's works for an exhibition that celebrated the 50th anniversary of the city. The exhibition – Brasilia. Flesh and Soul – displayed 27 canvas divided into three series, all of them inspired by the architectural landscape of Brasília and the history of its construction.

Shortly before Niemeyer's death in 2012, artist Sarah Morris filmed Niemeyer in his office for her 2012 film Rio.

In 2013, soon after Niemeyer's death, the Brazilian street artist Eduardo Kobra and four other painters paid their tribute to the architect with a gigantic mural, covering the entire side of a skyscraper at Paulista Avenue in São Paulo's financial district. The artwork is inspired by Niemeyer's architecture, his love of concrete and Le Corbusier.

Niemeyer is featured in the film Urbanized discussing his design process and architectural philosophy.

During the homage to Oscar Niemeyer on 15 December 2012 (it would have been his 105th birthday), the citizens movement released "Sentimiento Niemeyer" at the Centro Niemeyer in Spain. The verses were written by different people through a Facebook event and put together by musicians. The song was released under a Creative Commons license (attribution, non-profit, no-variations) so that other artists who shared the feeling around the world could make their own cover of the song, keeping the melody and translating the lyrics.

In July 2015 the Museum of Contemporary Art Tokyo (MoT) organized the first major retrospective of Niemeyer in Japan, curated by Yuko Hasegawa in collaboration with Kazuyo Sejima and Ryue Nishizawa from SANAA.

== Decorations and awards ==
- Member of the American Academy of Arts and Sciences (1949)
- Medal of the Order of Merit of Labour (Brazil, 1959)
- International Lenin Peace Prize (1963)
- Golden Lion of the Venice Biennale (Italy, 1963)
- Honorary Member of the American Institute of Architects (1963)
- Honorary Member of the National Institute of Arts and Letters (USA, 1964)
- Premio Benito Juarez on the occasion of the centennial of the Mexican Revolution (1964)
- Médaille Joliot-Curie (1965)
- Piece for strings, brass, pianos by the Swiss avant-garde composer Hermann Meier dedicated to Niemeyer (1967)
- Knight of the Legion of Honour (Chevalier de la Légion d'Honneur) (France, 1970)
- Commander of the Order of Prince Henry (Portugal, March 3, 1975)
- Lorenzo il Magnifico Prize of the Accademia Internazionale Medicea (Italy, 1980)
- Commander of the Order of Arts and Letters (Ordre des Arts et des Lettres) (France, 1982)
- Honorary Member of the Academy of Arts of the USSR (1983)
- Pritzker Prize for Architecture (1988) (with Gordon Bunshaft)
- Prince of Asturias Award (1989)
- Honorary Doctor of the University of Brasília (1989)
- Chico Mendes Resistance Medal (1989)
- Gold Medal of the Colegio de Arquitectos de Barcelona (1990)
- Knight Commander of the Order of St. Gregory the Great, bestowed by Pope John Paul II (1990)
- Grand Cross of the Order of Saint James of the Sword (Portugal, November 26, 1994)
- Honorary doctorate from the University of São Paulo (1995)
- Doctor Honoris Causa from the Federal University of Minas Gerais (1995)
- Saurí Order, 1st class (Dominican Republic, 1996)
- Golden Lion at the Venice Biennale, VI International Architecture Exhibition (Italy, 1996)
- Royal Gold Medal of the Royal Institute of British Architects (1998)
- Order of Solidarity (Cuba, 2001)
- Darcy Ribeiro Medal of Merit (State Board of Education of the State of Rio de Janeiro, 2001)
- Unesco Award in the category of Culture (2001)
- Grand Officer of the Order of Merit Teaching and Cultural Gabriela Mistral (Ministry of Education of Chile, 2001)
- "20th century architect" (Superior Council of the Institute of Architects of Brazil, 2001)
- Konex Award (Argentina, 2002)
- Praemium Imperiale (Japan, 2004)
- Austrian Decoration for Science and Art (2005)
- Patron of Brazilian architecture, declared by Law No. 11,117, of May 18, 2005
- Order of Cultural Merit (Brazil, 2007)
- Commander of the Legion of Honour (Commandeur de la Légion d'Honneur) (France, 2007)
- Order of Friendship (Russia, 2007)
- Medal Oscar Niemeyer's Communist Party Marxist-Leninist (2007)
- ALBA Arts Award (Venezuela, 2008), Cuba, Bolivia, Nicaragua [78]
- Order of Arts and Letters of Spain (November 6, 2009)
- Doctor Honoris Causa of the Technical University of Lisbon (2009)

== See also ==
- List of Oscar Niemeyer works
