= Califórnia Building (São Paulo) =

Building in República, São Paulo, Brazil

- Edifício e Galeria Califórnia
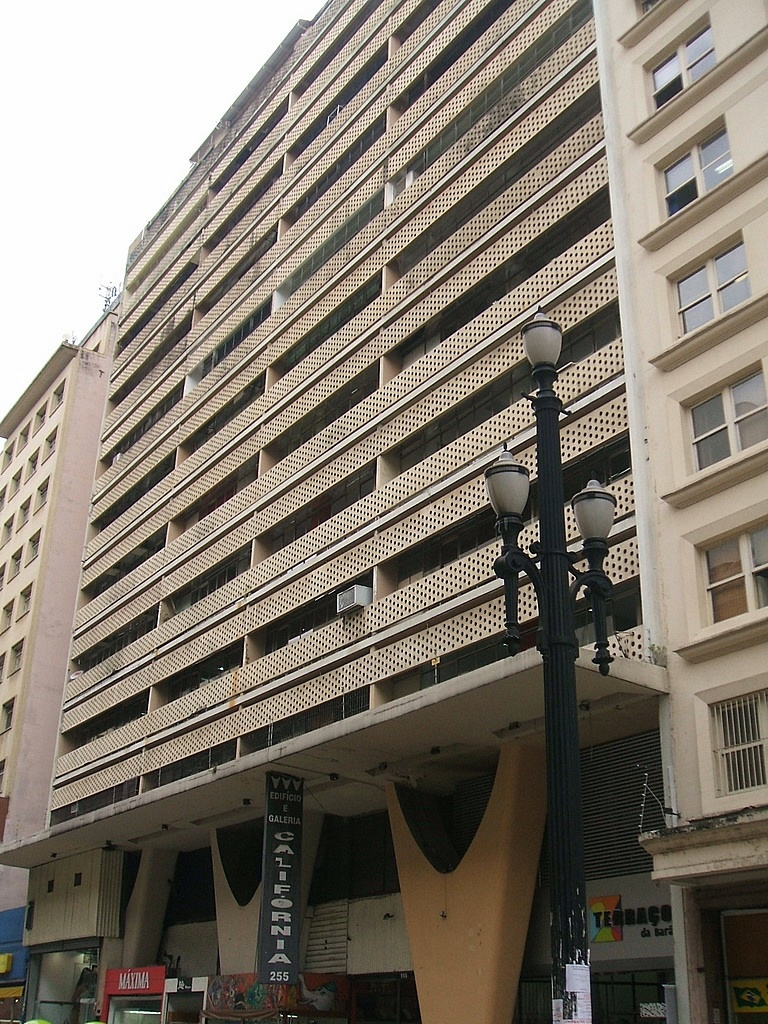
- Façade of Califórnia Building

- Location within São Paulo Location within Brazil

General information
- Architectural style: Modernism
- Location: Rua Dom José de Barros 67, República, São Paulo
- Coordinates: 23.5449467°S 46.6412545°W
- Groundbreaking: 1951
- Opened: 1955

Technical details
- Floor count: 13
- Floor area: 15,548 square metres (167,360 ft^{2})
- Lifts/elevators: 4
- Grounds: 286 square metres (3,080 ft^{2})

Design and construction
- Architects: Oscar Niemeyer, Carlos Lemos

The Califórnia Building (Portuguese: Edifício e Galeria Califórnia, also Edifício Califórnia) is a mixed-use building in the República district of São Paulo, Brazil. It was designed by the architect Oscar Niemeyer (1907–2012) with Carlos Lemos (born 1925). The building was designed in 1951 and completed in 1955. The Califórnia Building combined a gallery of retail space on its ground floor with residential units above, a theme common to Niemeyer's nearby Copan and Eiffel buildings. It sits on the corner of Barão de Itapetininga and Dom José de Barros avenues.
