= Anna Maria Niemeyer =

Brazilian architect (1929–2012)

- Born: Anna Maria Baldo Niemeyer; 16 December 1929; Rio de Janeiro, Brazil
- Died: 6 June 2012 (aged 82); Rio de Janeiro, Brazil
- Other names: Maria Niemeyer
- Occupations: Architect, furniture designer, gallery owner
- Spouse: Carlos Magalhães da Silveira (m. 1989; div. 2003)
- Children: 2
- Father: Oscar Niemeyer

Anna Maria Baldo Niemeyer (16 December 1929 – 6 June 2012) was a Brazilian architect, furniture designer and gallery owner. The only child of Oscar Niemeyer, she worked with her father to design the civic buildings for Brasília, focusing primarily on interior spaces and decoration. When her father decided to make furniture to harmonize his structures with the design elements, she turned her interest to furniture designing. Her two most noted designs were the initial prototype called the "Alta" and the "Rio". In her later career, she ran an art gallery in Rio, which at one time was the only gallery in the city, and assisted in the creation of the Niterói Contemporary Art Museum.

== Early life ==
Niemeyer was born on 16 December 1929 in Rio de Janeiro to Annita Baldo and Oscar Niemeyer.

== Career ==
When the Urbanization Company of New Capital of Brazil (Portuguese: Companhia Urbanizadora da Nova Capital do Brasil (NOVACAP)), was established in 1956, Niemeyer's father held the position of architect-in-charge. As such, he had responsibility for all the designs of buildings and monuments in the planned city. In 1960, Niemeyer moved to Brasília as one of the 120 professionals in the Urbanism and Architecture Department of NOVACAP. Her work with her father, focused on designing interior spaces for some of his buildings, including the Palácio da Alvorada, the Palácio do Planalto, the National Congress and the Supreme Federal Court. The Palácio da Alvorada is the official residence of Brazil's president, and Niemeyer was responsible for the design of the banquet hall, as well as the interior decoration and design of the chairs. She completed furniture designs for the Palácio do Planalto and designed the tiled sauna for the Congressional Clubhouse.

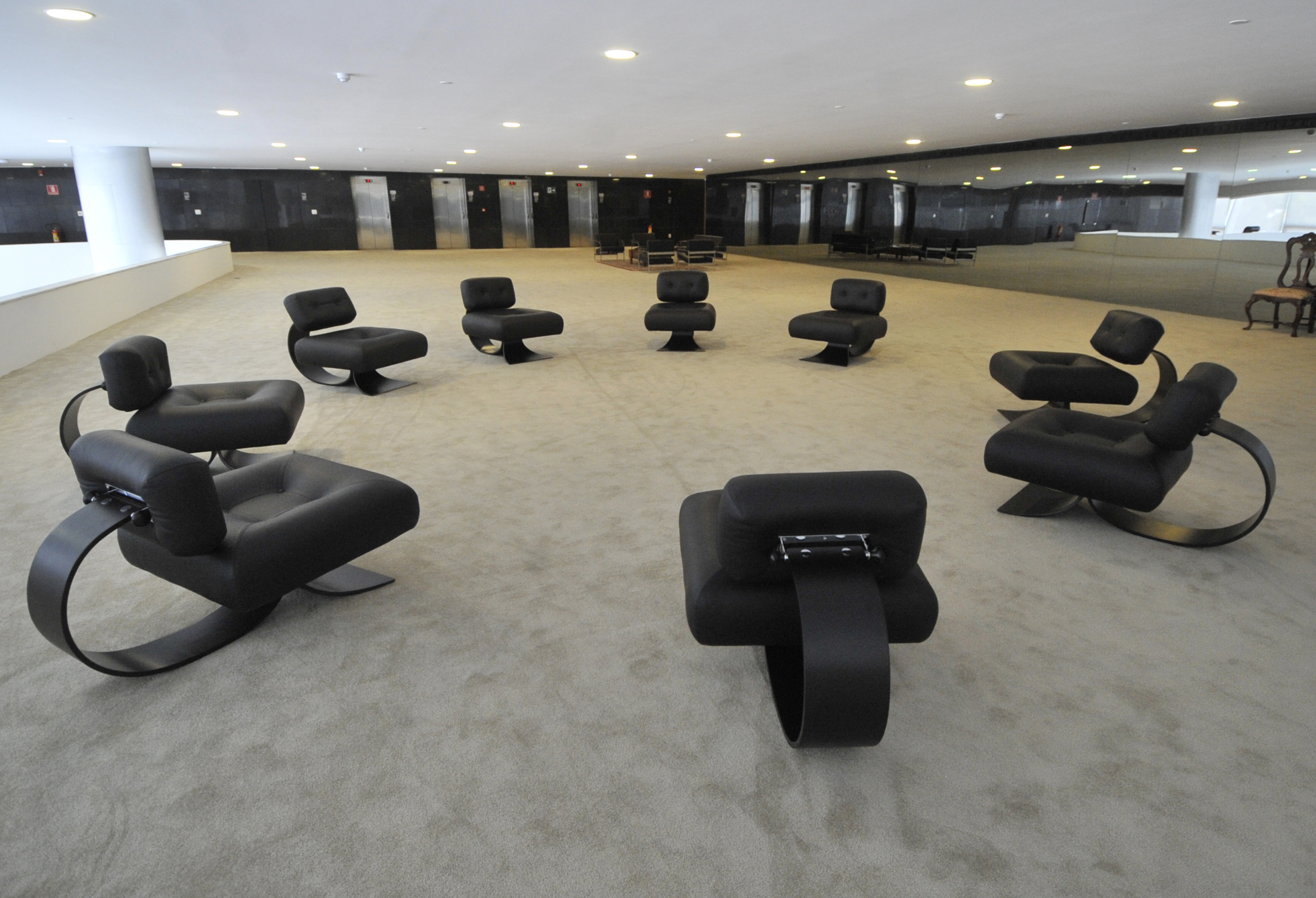
"Alta" style chair, designed by Niemeyer

Beginning in 1970, Niemeyer, in collaboration with her father, began producing furniture, based on a Swedish technique using plywood and glue to create curved forms. By creating their own furniture, they were able to harmonize the design of the building with furniture that actually fit the spaces, rather than losing the room design to the furnishings. The duo typically used natural materials including leather, straw and wood, though their first design was of metal. In 1971, the first prototype was created in France, because the technology to bend the steel was not yet available in Brazil. The oversized chair, with a stool, "Alta" was designed by Niemeyer and featured a curved steel frame over which the seat and backrest were mounted on wood and upholstered with leather.

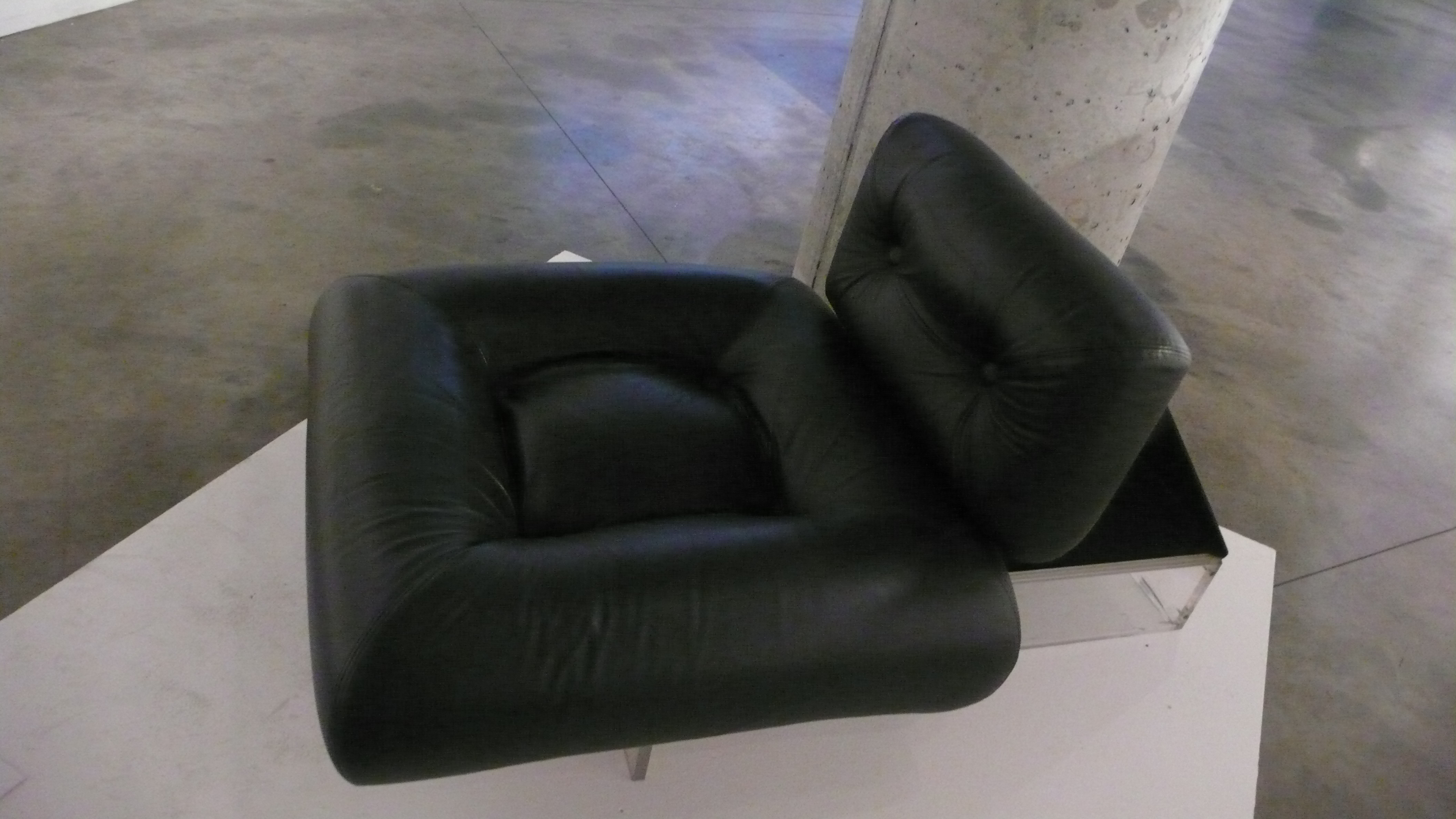
A. M. Niemeyer, chair designed for Burgo Group

Later, the pieces of "mobile architecture" that Niemeyer produced were made of bent pressed wood, as construction was easier and less expensive. The furniture she produced included stationary and rocking chairs, couches and longues and tables, of which most were originally designed for her father's architectural projects. Most of the furnishings were produced in Brazil, but the duo also opened a manufacturing studio in Italy where some pieces were made. A Japanese firm, Tendo Brasileira, operating in Brazil, was initially given exclusive production rights and each piece was issued a unique serial number to prevent forgeries. In the 1980s, the firm of Milly Teperman of São Paulo began production of the designs. Niemeyers works were exhibited in many locations throughout the world, including among others, the Centre Georges Pompidou and the Salon in Paris, the Internationale Möbelmesse Fair in Cologne, the Milan Furniture Fair in Milan and the United Nations Building in New York City.

The Niemeyers' most important design was the "Rio", a chaise longue designed in 1970 for her father's personal use. Using the curves favored by her father, reminiscent of the coastline of his native Brazil and the figure of a woman, the frame was made of three curved elements to give balance and create the structure of the chair. The main support allowed the chair to rock and provided balance, while the smaller elements braced the head and foot of the seat. The shaped plywood was stained with black lacquer and the cylindrical headrest affixed by two cords was made of black leather. Tensioned wicker of woven natural cane stretched over the frame to form the seat of the rocker. The chair did not go into production until 1978, when it was made in Brazil at the Tendo plant.

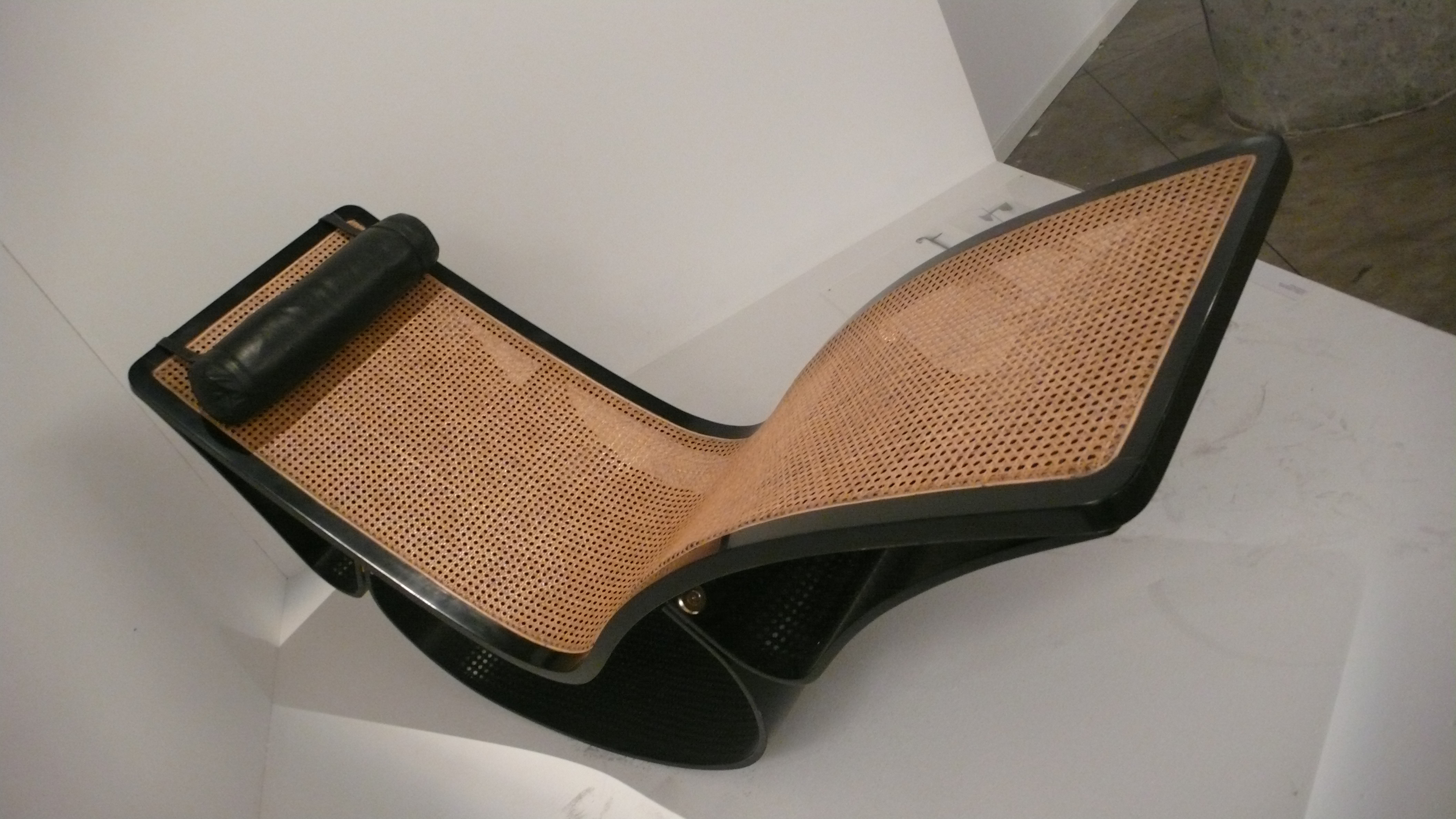
Chaise-longue "Rio" production began 1978

Niemeyer left Brasília in 1973 and in 1977, after returning to Rio de Janeiro opened the Galeria Anna Maria Niemeyer. Two years later, she moved the gallery to the neighborhood of Gávea. In the 1980s, Niemeyer began a relationship with Carlos Magalhães da Silveira, an architect with whom she had worked at NOVACAP and who also was a business partner of her father. They married and had two children, Carlos Oscar and Ana Cláudia. During the 1990s, hers was the only art gallery in Rio. She featured works of many of Brazil's iconic artists, including Farnese de Andrade, Jorge Eduardo Guinle, Franz Weissmann and others, hosting over 300 exhibits during her lifetime. She was one of the founders of the idea to create the Niterói Contemporary Art Museum (Portuguese: Museu de Arte Contemporânea de Niterói (MAC-Niterói)), along with Victor Arruda. Between 1991 and 1996, she worked on designs of the MAC-Niterói project with her father. All of the furnishings of the museum were her designs. She also collaborated with her father on the Latin-American Parliament Building in São Paulo and the Oscar Niemeyer Museum in Curitiba. In 2003, Niemeyer and Magalhães separated, after their daughter was killed in a car accident.

In 2010, Niemeyer was called by President Luiz Inácio Lula da Silva to assist in returning the interior of the Alvorada Palace back to its original presentation. Over the years, furnishings had been replaced, put in storage, or the rooms altered to fit the customs and preferences of the various occupants. Lula wanted to restore the original design to preserve the historical integrity of the residence. Searching through archives and government properties, first lady Marisa Lula oversaw the project in which she discovered through Niemeyer that the original chairs, thought to have been Mies van der Rohe creations shipped from Barcelona, were in fact copies made by Niemeyer, as there was no money to buy the 1929 originals or have them shipped.

== Death and legacy ==
Niemeyer died on 6 June 2012 in the Samaritan Hospital of Rio after a lengthy stay with emphysema and cancer. She was buried at the Cemitério de São João Batista in the Botafogo neighborhood of Rio de Janeiro. Her furniture designs have become collector's items and are featured in museum and private collections, like the "Rio" in the permanent collection of the NoHo Modern in the NoHo Arts District, Los Angeles. They have been sold by both Christie's and Sotheby's as works of art.
