= Museum of Modern Art in Caracas =

Unbuilt museum

- Museo de Arte Moderno de Caracas
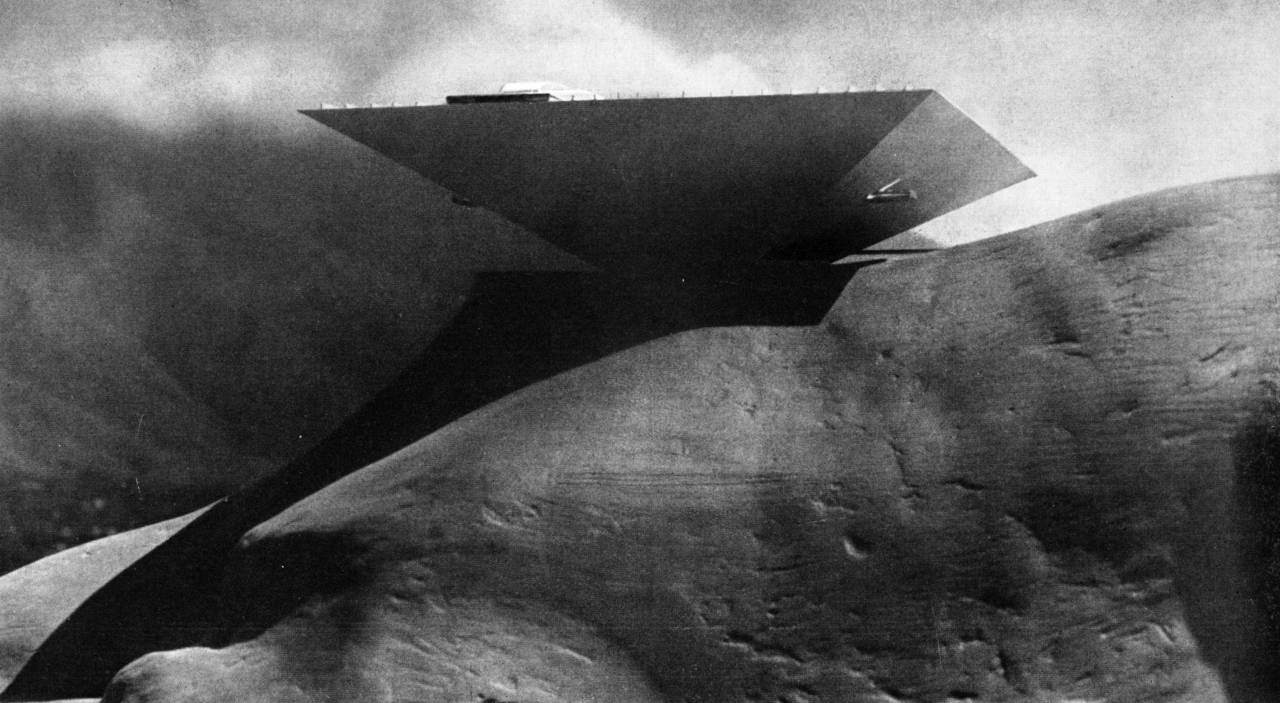
- Model of Museum of Modern Art in Caracas

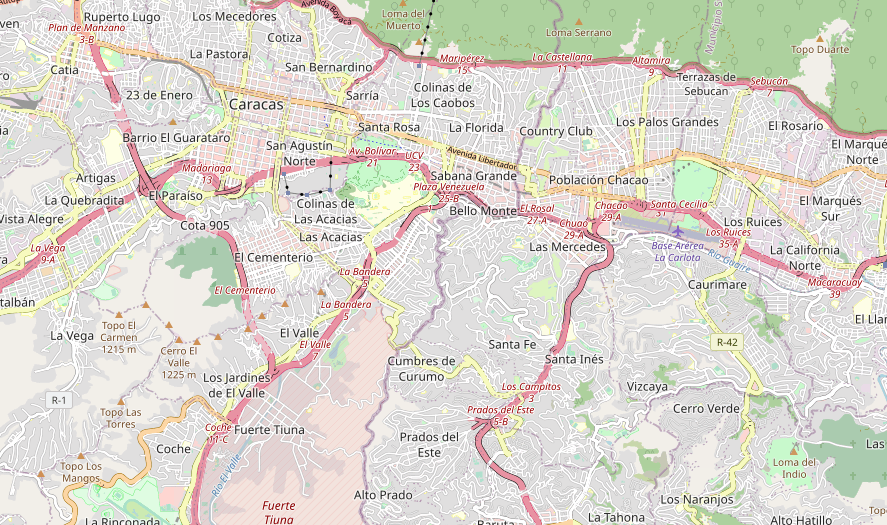
- Location within Caracas

General information
- Status: Never completed
- Architectural style: Modernist
- Location: Caracas, Venezuela
- Coordinates: 10.4805353°N 66.8728497°W

Technical details
- Floor count: 4

Design and construction
- Architect: Oscar Niemeyer

The Museum of Modern Art in Caracas (Spanish: Museo de Arte Moderno de Caracas) was a proposed art museum in Caracas, Venezuela. It was designed in the form of an inverted pyramid, and proposed to be placed on a cliff in the neighborhood of Colinas de Bello Monte high above the Central Zone of Caracas. The proposed structure would be entirely opaque without a visual connection to its surroundings from the interior; natural light would only enter the building via a glass ceiling. It was designed between 1954 and 1955 by Oscar Niemeyer and never realized.
