= Conjunto Governador Kubitschek =

Residential complex in Belo Horizonte, Brazil

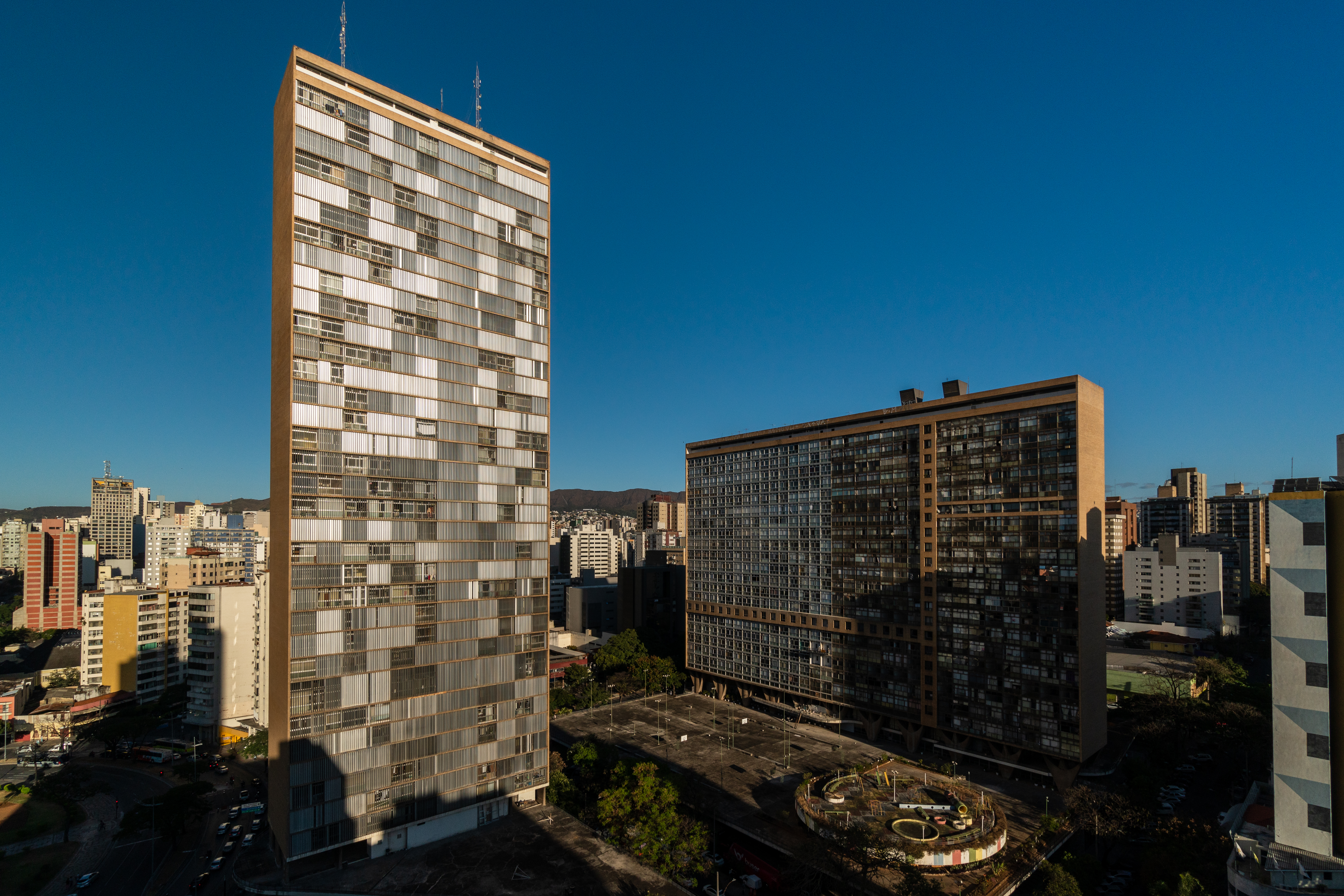
- Blocks B and A of the JK Building in 2020
- Location in Belo Horizonte
- Alternative names: JK Building; JK Complex

General information
- Status: Completed
- Type: Mixed-use residential complex
- Architectural style: Modernist
- Location: Santo Agostinho, Belo Horizonte, Brazil
- Coordinates: 19°55′27″S 43°56′47″W

Technical details
- Floor count: 23 (Block A); 36 (Block B)

Design and construction
- Architect: Oscar Niemeyer
- Developer: Joaquim Rolla
- Structural engineer: Joaquim Cardozo

Other information
- Number of units: 1,086 apartments

Website
- www.conjuntojk.com

The Conjunto Governador Kubitschek (Governor Kubitschek Complex), commonly known as the JK Building or JK Complex, (Note: The initials "JK" refer to Juscelino Kubitschek, who was governor of Minas Gerais when the project was launched and later became president of Brazil.) is a historic mixed-use residential complex in the Santo Agostinho neighborhood of Belo Horizonte, Minas Gerais, Brazil.

Designed by Oscar Niemeyer in 1951, with structural engineering by Joaquim Cardozo, the complex was developed during Juscelino Kubitschek's governorship of Minas Gerais and was named after him.

Located near Praça Raul Soares in the city's South-Central Region, the complex consists of two large residential blocks facing Rua dos Timbiras and Rua dos Guajajaras. Block A has 23 floors, while Block B has 36 and is one of the most prominent vertical landmarks in central Belo Horizonte. The complex contains 1,086 apartments of various types and is home to about 5,000 residents, giving it the scale of a dense vertical neighborhood.

The JK Complex is part of Niemeyer's modernist work in Belo Horizonte following the Pampulha Modern Ensemble. Its original program was unusually ambitious for a residential development, combining apartments with government offices, stores, restaurants, hotel facilities, recreation spaces, cultural facilities, and a planned museum of modern art. Several parts of this program were reduced, delayed, or left unfinished, but the complex remained an unusual example in Belo Horizonte of housing planned in association with services, commerce, and shared urban life.

The complex received permanent designation as municipal cultural heritage from Belo Horizonte's heritage council in 2022. The designation was based on the complex's architectural scale, its place in the development of high-rise housing in Belo Horizonte, its connections with Niemeyer and Kubitschek, and its long public life as one of the city's most recognizable modernist buildings.

== History ==
=== Previous use of the site ===
The site of the Conjunto Governador Kubitschek was previously occupied by the Escola de Aprendizes Artífices de Minas Gerais, a vocational school that later became part of the institutional history of the Federal Center for Technological Education of Minas Gerais. The institution was founded as the Escola de Aprendizes Artífices de Minas Gerais and subsequently had several names, including Liceu Industrial de Minas Gerais, Escola Industrial de Belo Horizonte, Escola Técnica de Belo Horizonte, and Escola Técnica Federal de Minas Gerais, before becoming the Federal Center for Technological Education of Minas Gerais. The school remained on the site until the late 1930s, and its former building was demolished in the 1940s as part of the redevelopment of Praça Raul Soares.

The choice of site gave the future complex a prominent position in central Belo Horizonte. Praça Raul Soares had become one of the city's important urban spaces, and the new project was planned on a scale capable of transforming the square's surroundings and the capital's skyline.

=== Commission and launch ===
The complex was conceived during Juscelino Kubitschek's governorship of Minas Gerais. Kubitschek had left the mayoralty of Belo Horizonte to become governor of the state on February 1, 1951, following a municipal administration closely associated with the Pampulha works and the public image of modern architecture in the city.

Oscar Niemeyer designed the development in 1951, and the structural calculations were carried out by Joaquim Cardozo. The project was led by businessman Joaquim Rolla; the state government provided the site near Praça Raul Soares, while private enterprise undertook the construction.

The project was publicly launched in late November 1951. Local newspapers presented it as an exceptionally large and modern undertaking for Belo Horizonte, a city that still had relatively few tall buildings and a population of just over 350,000. Promotional language surrounding the complex associated it with progress, comfort, and a new form of urban life. The plan promised apartments for a growing middle class, government offices for the state administration, and a wide range of shared amenities for residents and visitors.

=== Original program ===
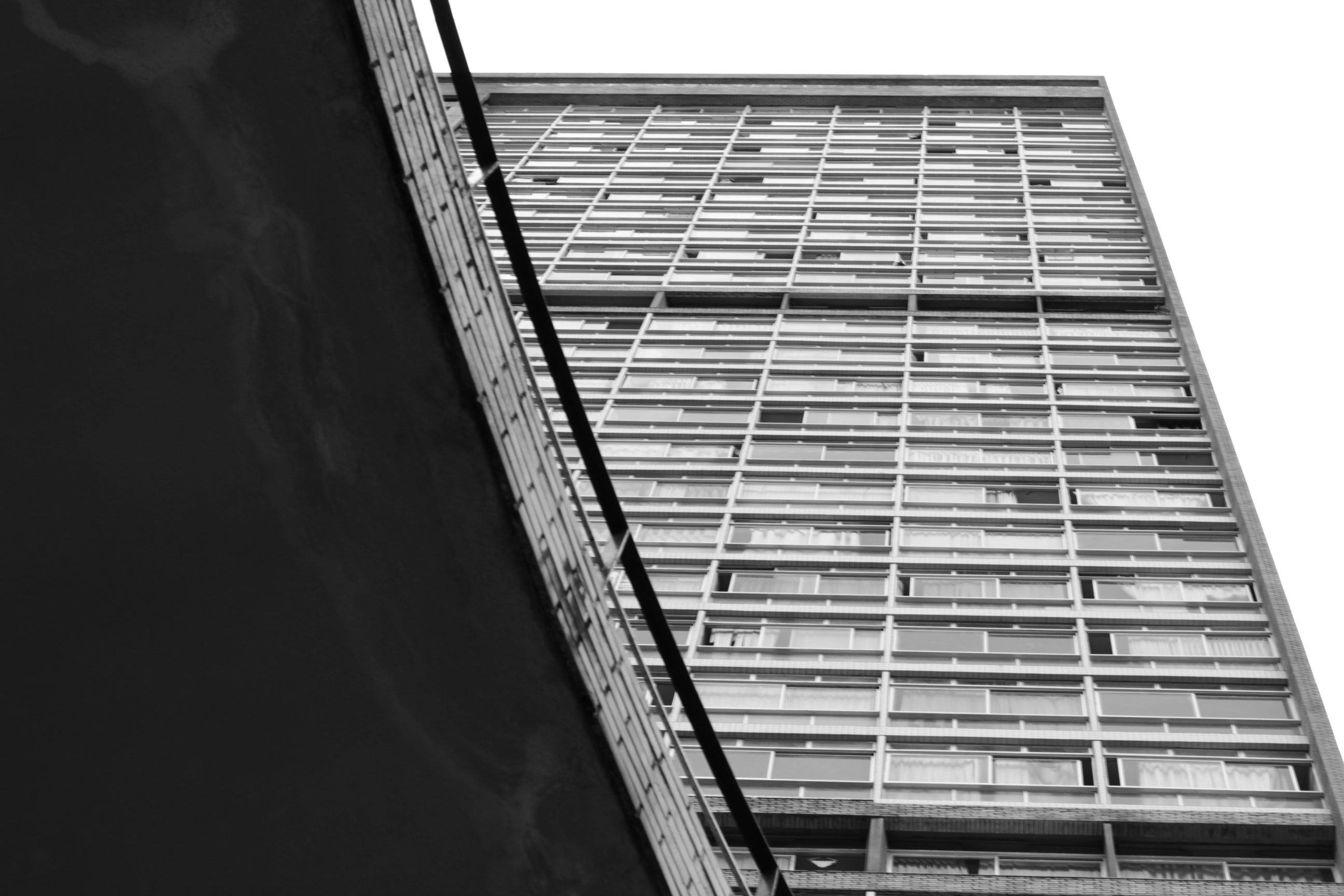
The JK Complex photographed from nearby streets in 2012

Niemeyer's proposal drew on the idea of a large collective building and had some affinities with the phalanstères envisioned by Charles Fourier. (Note: The phalanstère was the collective building proposed by Fourier for a self-sufficient community, combining housing, work, and shared services.) The complex was planned as a dense urban community that brought housing, government offices, commercial spaces, recreation areas, and cultural facilities together in a single development.

The original program was far more ambitious than the building that later entered use. It included apartments, stores, restaurants, laundries, a hotel, a movie theater, a theater, a nightclub, a café, a swimming pool, a museum of modern art, and a bus and tourist terminal. The design also called for a monumental elevated walkway connecting the two blocks, with some of the planned cultural spaces arranged around this connection.

Joaquim Rolla's career helped shape the complex's social program. Before the JK project, he had been associated with hotels, casinos, and leisure developments, including the Palácio Quitandinha in Petrópolis. The planned restaurants, entertainment venues, hotel facilities, and shared services gave the JK Complex something of the atmosphere of a resort transplanted to central Belo Horizonte.

=== Design changes and construction ===
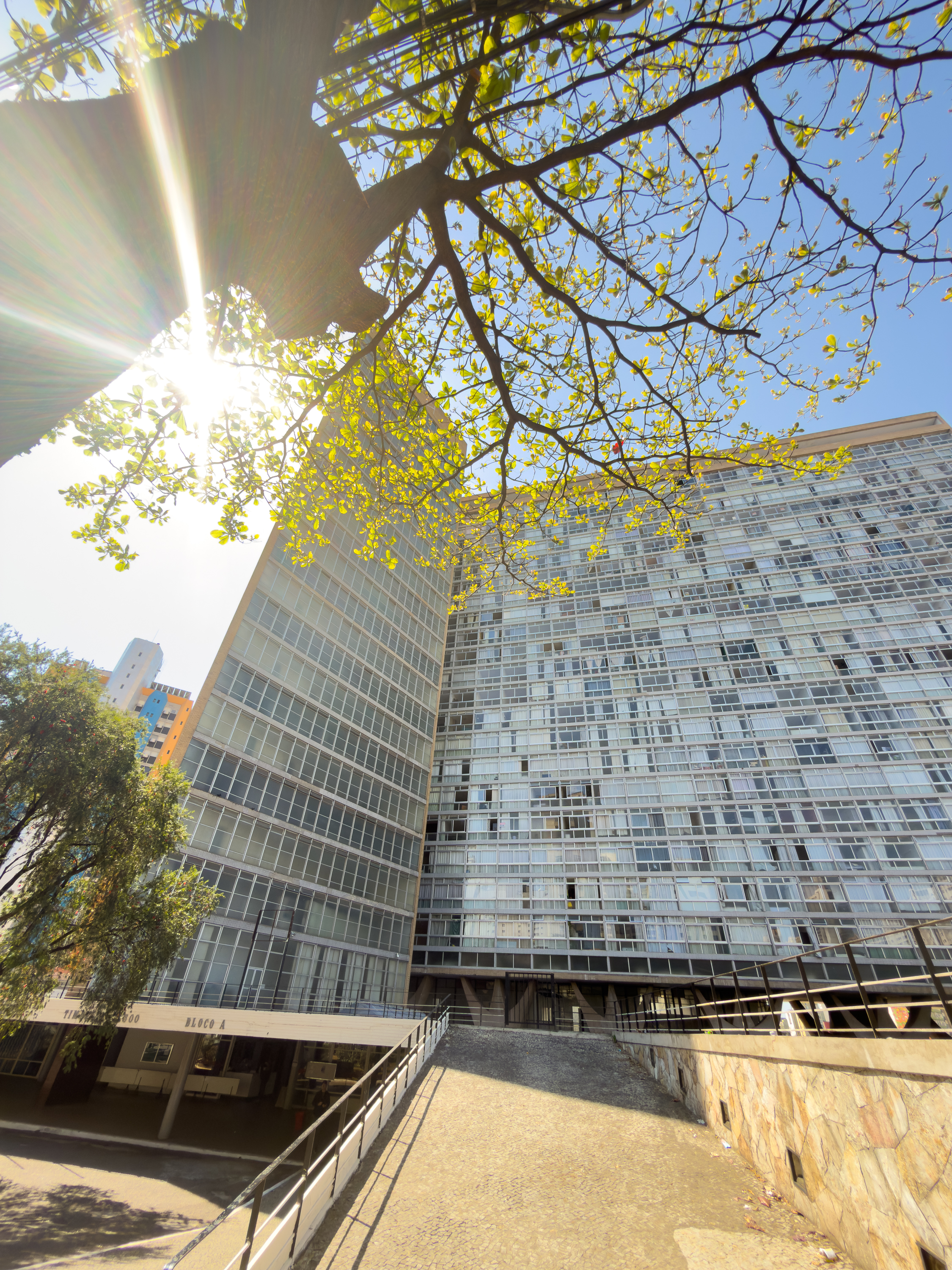
Street-level view of the Conjunto Governador Kubitschek in 2025

The design changed during its development. An early version called for a long horizontal block with 637 apartments distributed across 22 floors. Later versions added the taller tower and increased the number of residential units, resulting in the two-block composition that defines the complex today.

The final complex was organized into two buildings. Block A, facing Rua dos Timbiras, has 23 floors. Block B, facing Rua dos Guajajaras, has 36 floors. The completed development contains more than 1,000 apartments in several layouts, with units ranging from about 22.7 m^{2} (244 sq ft) to 152.8 m^{2} (1,645 sq ft). About 5,000 people live in the complex.

Construction took much longer than expected. Work began in 1951, was halted in 1956, and resumed in 1968. The apartments began to be delivered in 1971, while several parts of the original program were reduced, delayed, or left unfinished.

=== Occupancy and later changes ===
The gap between the original plan and the building's later use marked much of its history. The museum of modern art, hotel facilities, swimming pool, recreation spaces, and planned elevated walkway were never fully realized as Niemeyer and Rolla had envisioned them. The elevated walkway, designed to connect the two blocks at the fifth floor, was never completed.

Several planned spaces were put to other uses over time. The area intended for the museum of modern art was later occupied by a police facility and is now used by the 3rd Integrated Public Security Area. The space intended for the movie theater later housed a nightclub and subsequently came into religious use. Areas planned for restaurants and nightlife also changed function as the complex adapted to the routines of condominium life.

The lower levels were planned to include the bus and tourist terminal, along with stores, banks, postal services, tourism agencies, and travel agencies. The road-tourism terminal opened in 1985, preserving part of the transportation role envisioned in the original program.

By the 21st century, the JK Complex had become an inhabited vertical neighborhood shaped by residents, businesses, public facilities, and long-running condominium disputes. Its residents, commercial spaces, public facilities, and recurring administrative conflicts transformed the complex into one of Belo Horizonte's most recognizable examples of the encounter between modernist ambition and the ordinary pressures of urban life.

== Architecture ==
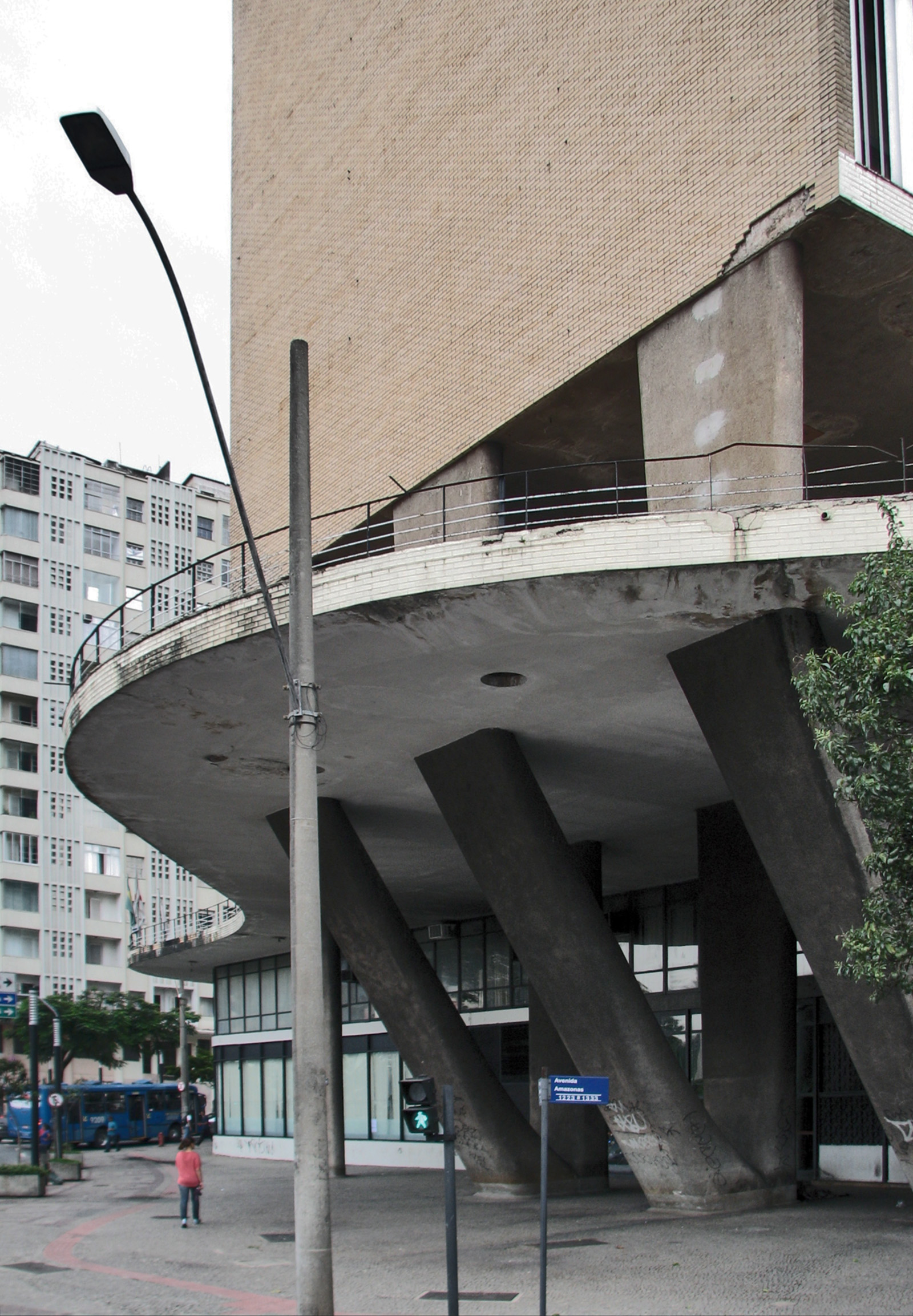
The JK Complex within Belo Horizonte's dense urban landscape

The Conjunto Governador Kubitschek is one of Oscar Niemeyer's principal residential works in Belo Horizonte. Designed in 1951, the complex applied modernist housing ideas on an unusually large scale, bringing apartments, services, commerce, recreation areas, and public uses into the same development. The structural design was by Joaquim Cardozo, a frequent collaborator of Niemeyer.

=== Urban concept and program ===
The complex was conceived as a large residential and urban scheme beside Praça Raul Soares. Niemeyer's proposal employed the idea of a compact vertical community in which housing would be connected with everyday services and public facilities. The original program included apartments, stores, restaurants, laundries, recreation areas, a hotel, government offices, a movie theater, a theater, a nightclub, a café, a swimming pool, a museum of modern art, and a bus and tourist terminal.

The design was organized around two residential blocks, known as Block A and Block B. The towers were planned with shared functions on the ground and basement levels, including commercial areas and circulation spaces connecting the complex to the surrounding city. Some parts of the original program were simplified, delayed, or left unfinished during the lengthy construction process.

=== Block A ===
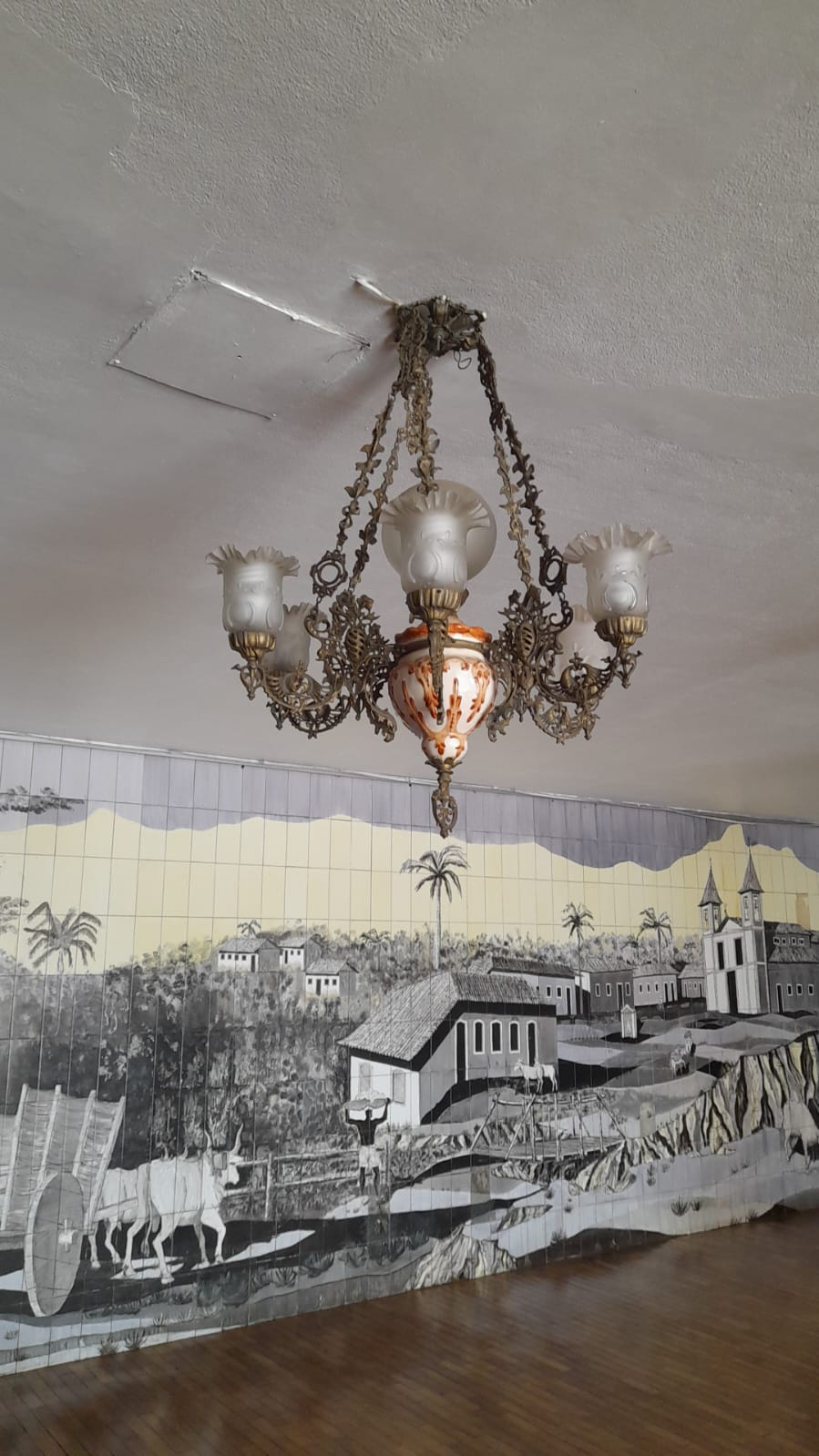
A corridor in Block A, with hand-painted tiles

Block A faces Rua dos Timbiras and has 23 floors. It is the lower of the two residential blocks and occupied a central role in the original mixed-use program. The first four floors were planned for hotel use, while other shared facilities were also proposed for the complex, including the museum of modern art and recreation spaces.

The plans approved for Block A in 1954 show two different forms of apartment organization. On one side of the triangular elevator core, the apartments were arranged as single-level units using a repeated structural rhythm of load-bearing walls. This side of the block included five different apartment types. On the other side, Niemeyer used the skip-floor layout, with common corridors only on alternate floors.

=== Block B ===
Block B faces Rua dos Guajajaras and has 36 floors. It is the taller tower and accounts for much of the complex's presence in the landscape around Praça Raul Soares. Its height and slender vertical mass contrast with the lower, broader Block A, causing the complex to be perceived as a pair of related buildings rather than as a single tower.

The skip-floor organization was used more extensively in Block B. Beginning on the tenth floor, the tower employed the arrangement on all of its residential floors. This gave the taller block an internal rhythm different from that of a conventional residential tower, because corridors did not have to run through every floor.

=== Apartment types and skip-floor layout ===
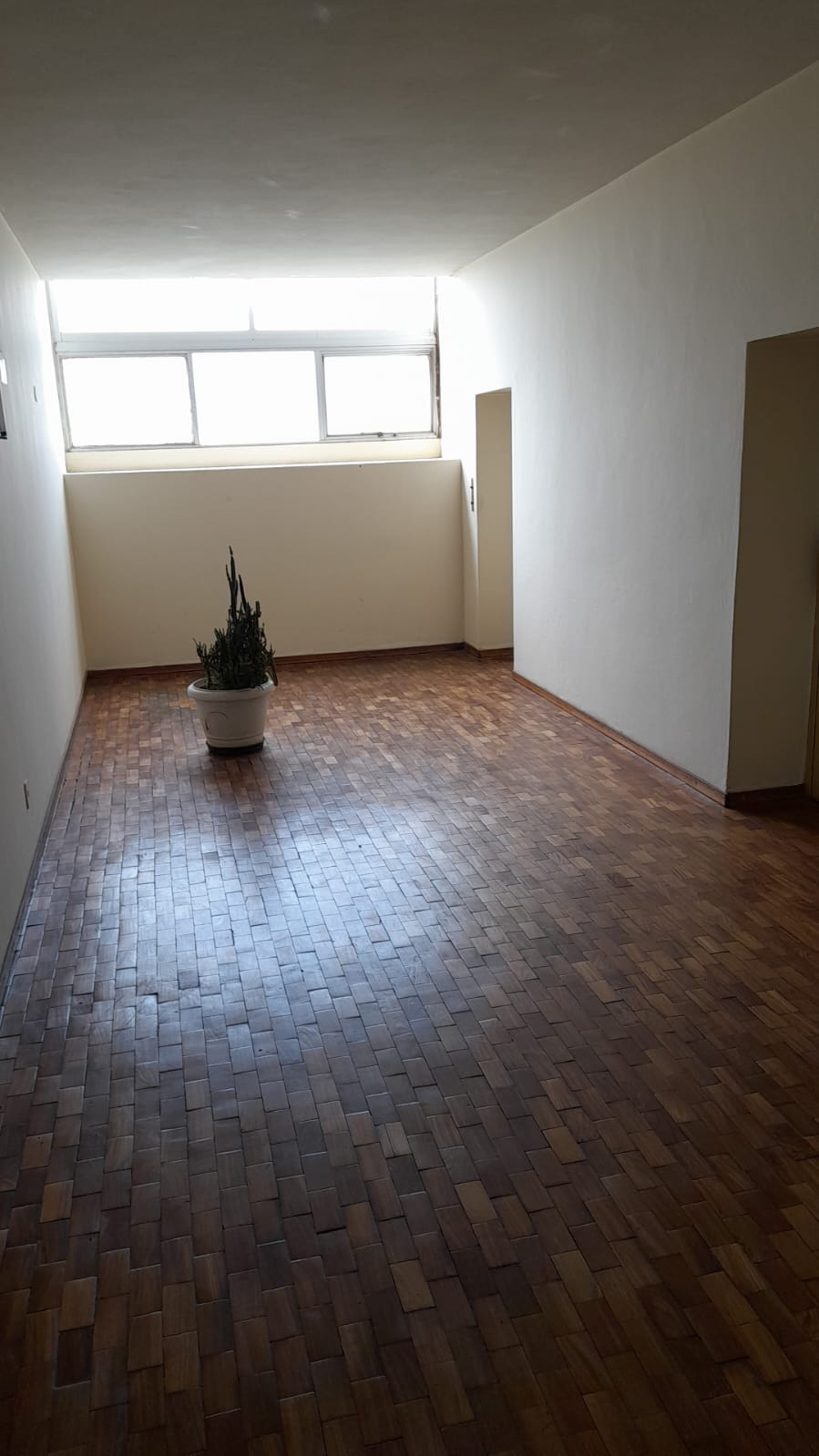
Interior of one of the apartments

The complex has 1,086 apartments in 13 types, ranging in area from about 22.7 m^{2} (244 sq ft) to 152.8 m^{2} (1,645 sq ft). This variety was unusual within a single residential complex and gave the building a diverse population, with some residents in compact units and families occupying larger apartments.

The skip-floor units were among the design's most distinctive elements. In these apartments, the floor levels were offset, creating interiors on half-levels connected by private stairs. The common corridor served the unit on one level, while part of the apartment extended half a level above or below. This solution reduced the area devoted to shared corridors and gave the apartments a more varied internal section than a flat, single-level layout.

Niemeyer's drawings also gave prominence to the balconies of the skip-floor apartments. The original plans treated them as substantial parts of the units, with balconies arranged along the façades and used to open the apartments to the city. Promotional material for the complex explained the skip-floor plan through sectional drawings, presenting the solution as part of a new way of living in a modern residential building.

=== Shared areas and unfinished elements ===
The areas between and beneath the blocks were planned as important parts of the complex. The design included commercial spaces, services, and a recreation and circulation area between the towers, intended to facilitate movement by residents and visitors through the development. A monumental elevated walkway was also planned to connect the two blocks, but it was never completed.

The basement and lower levels were intended to house the bus and tourist terminal, along with stores, banks, postal services, tourism agencies, and travel agencies. These shared uses gave the project a scale closer to that of a small urban center than an ordinary residential building. The long construction process and later changes to the condominium meant that the completed complex preserved only part of Niemeyer's original social and urban program.

=== Relationship to Niemeyer's other residential works ===
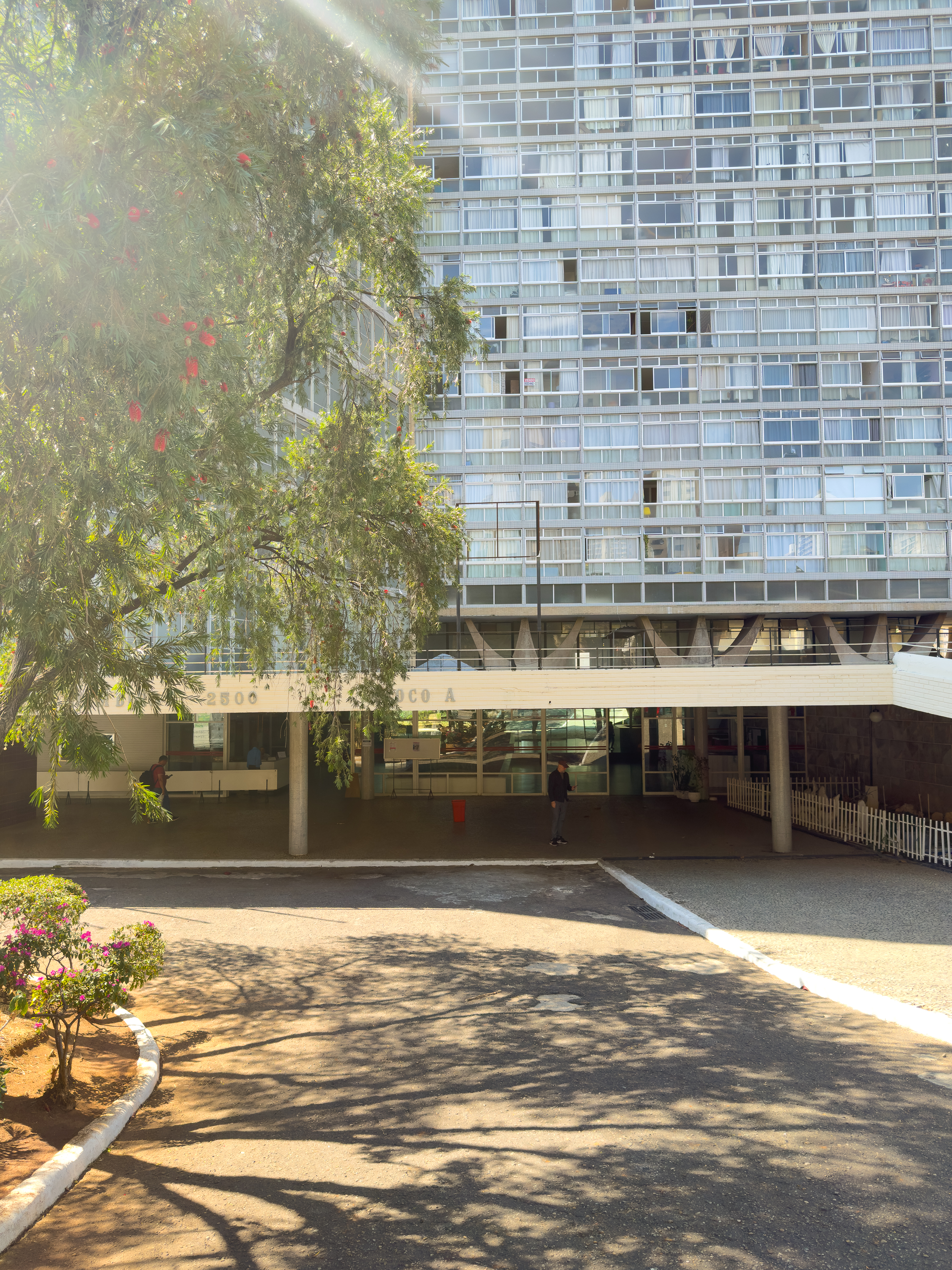
Entrance to the building

The Conjunto Governador Kubitschek belongs to a broader group of residential and mixed-use buildings designed by Niemeyer during the 1950s, when the architect applied modernist ideas to dense urban sites in Belo Horizonte and São Paulo. These works belong to a period in which Niemeyer was testing how apartment buildings could incorporate services, commerce, and public life in rapidly growing Brazilian cities.

In Belo Horizonte, the closest comparison is the Niemeyer Building on Praça da Liberdade, designed in the 1950s and completed in 1960. The building on Praça da Liberdade is much smaller and more sculptural, with a curved façade wrapped in horizontal brise-soleil. Its apartments are arranged around a triangular site, while the JK Complex uses two much larger blocks and has a broader mixed-use program. The comparison shows two aspects of Niemeyer's residential work in the city: on the one hand, a compact luxury apartment building beside a historic square; on the other, a large urban complex planned as a vertical community beside Praça Raul Soares.

Niemeyer's projects in São Paulo place the JK Complex within the same broader experiment. In the Edifício Copan, designed in the early 1950s and completed in 1966, Niemeyer used a long, sinuous residential block with commercial space on the ground floor. The building became one of the best-known examples of Brazilian modernist housing, with more than 1,100 apartments and numerous stores and services at street level. Like the JK Complex, the Copan treated housing as part of a larger urban system. The two projects differ in form: the Copan is defined by the long curve of a single large block, while the JK Complex is organized around the contrast between Block A and the taller Block B.

A comparison with the Montreal Building and the Eiffel Building, also in São Paulo, helps place the JK Complex within Niemeyer's experiments with apartment layouts and urban sites. The Montreal used compact units on an irregular corner site and a façade marked by horizontal brise-soleil. The Eiffel used duplex apartments facing Praça da República, with entry on the upper level and bedrooms on the lower level, an arrangement that reversed the usual duplex configuration. The JK Complex used another variation of planning in section through its skip-floor apartments, in which corridors served units on alternate floors and the apartments extended across offset levels.

The comparison demonstrates the scale of the JK Complex and the breadth of its original program. The Niemeyer Building explored the curved residential façade in a compact building. The Copan gave São Paulo a large inhabited curve, with stores and services on the ground floor. The Montreal and Eiffel tested other ways of organizing apartment buildings on difficult urban sites. The JK Complex brought many of these concerns together in a two-block complex containing more than 1,000 apartments and a planned mixture of housing, commerce, recreation, services, and public uses.

=== Modernist character ===
The architectural language of the Conjunto Governador Kubitschek belongs to Niemeyer's work of the 1950s, with reinforced concrete, large volumes, pilotis, mixed uses, and a strong interest in the building section. The project reflected the modernist belief that architecture could reshape everyday life through new forms of housing, shared services, and collective space.

In Belo Horizonte, the complex marked a new scale of high-rise residential development. Its two blocks, large number of units, and mixture of private apartments with public and commercial functions made it one of the city's clearest attempts to transform modernist housing theory into an everyday urban environment.

== Heritage designation ==
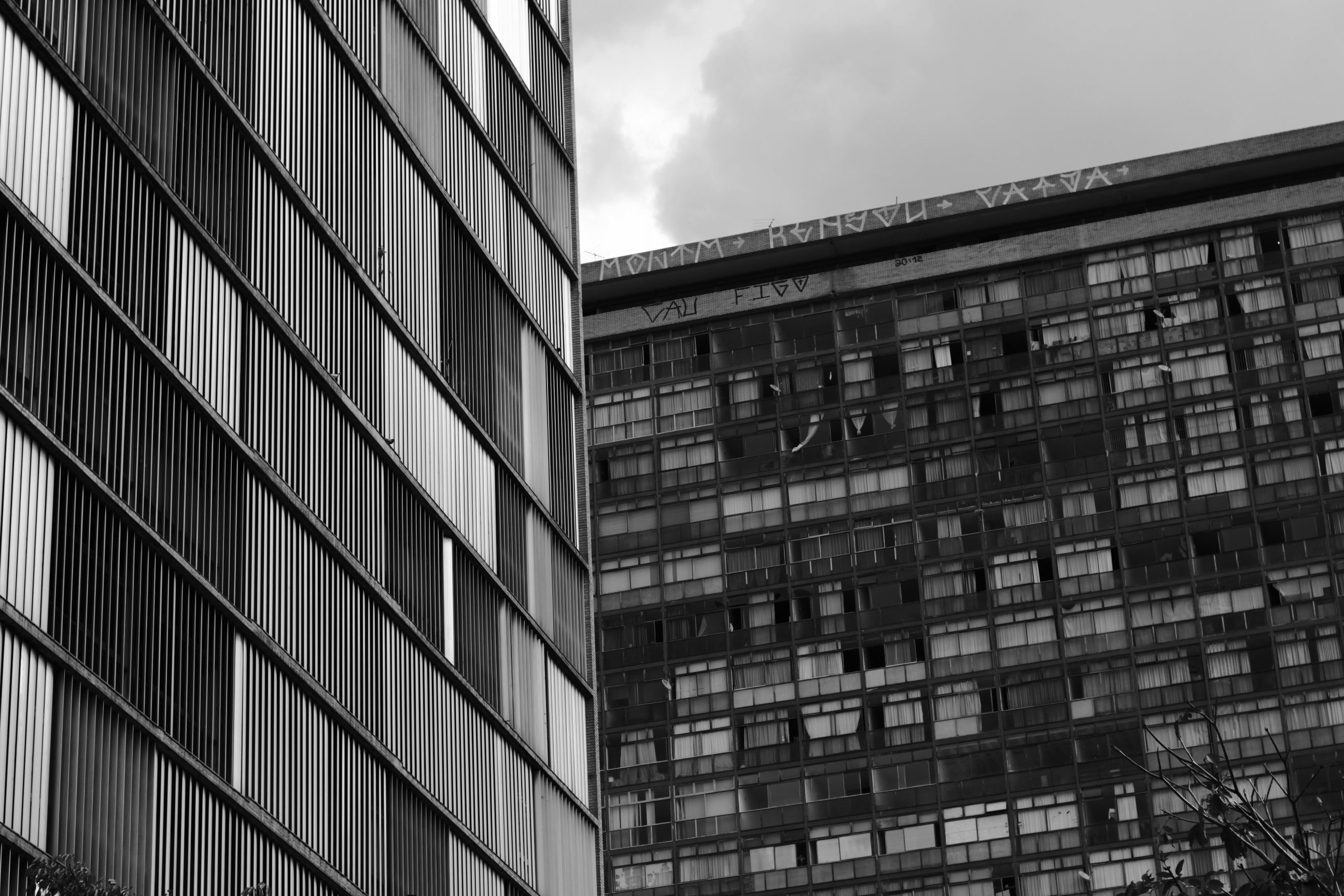
The JK Complex photographed in 2012

The process of obtaining municipal heritage status for the Conjunto Governador Kubitschek began in 2007, when Belo Horizonte's heritage council opened the first proceedings to examine its cultural value. The surroundings of the complex had already entered the city's heritage register. In 2009, the area encompassing Praça Raul Soares and Avenida Olegário Maciel was placed under municipal protection, bringing formal recognition to one of the principal areas shaped by Belo Horizonte's 20th-century growth.

On April 27, 2022, the Deliberative Council for the Cultural Heritage of the Municipality of Belo Horizonte approved the complex's permanent designation as municipal cultural heritage. The decision covered both buildings that form the complex, located at 2500 Rua dos Timbiras and 1268 Rua dos Guajajaras. The designation gave formal protection to one of the city's most visible modernist residential landmarks, a large-scale work by Oscar Niemeyer associated with the period when Belo Horizonte was experimenting with new forms of high-rise housing.

The designation also recognized the unusual variety of uses planned for the complex. Conceived as a compact community, the project brought apartments, services, stores, recreation spaces, and public uses together in a single development, making it one of Belo Horizonte's clearest examples of modernist housing planned around everyday urban life.

== Public life and later history ==
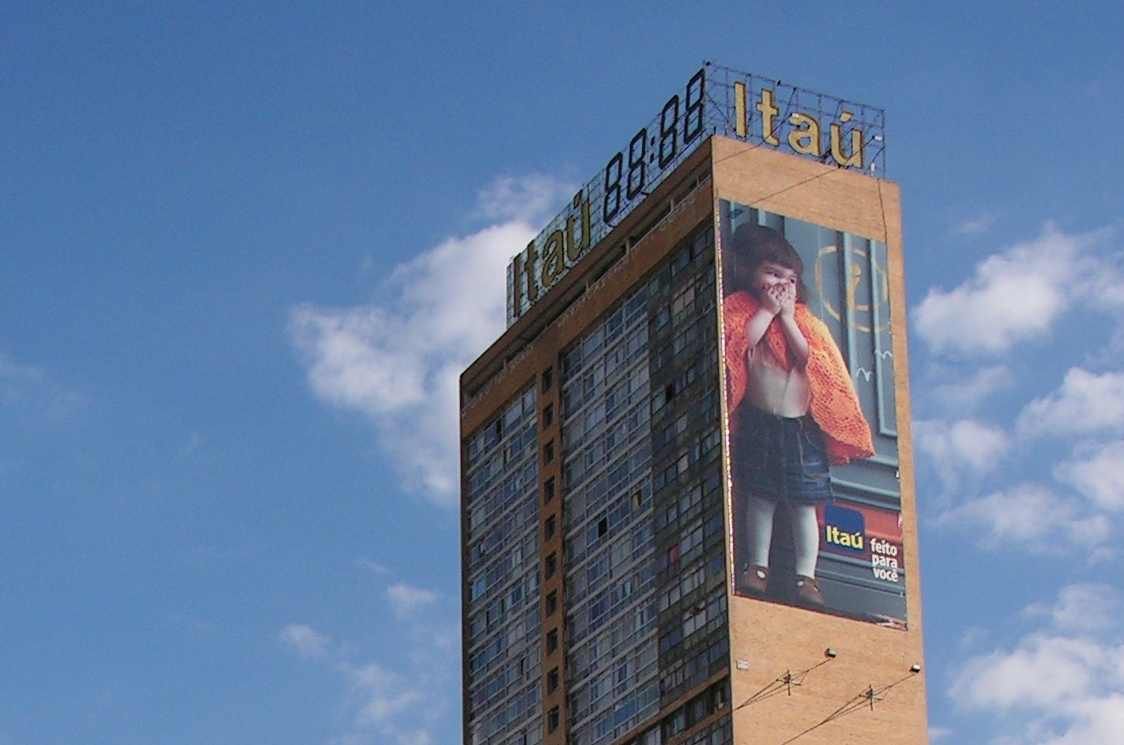
Block B with the former illuminated Itaú clock on its roof in 2008

For decades, one of the complex's best-known features was the illuminated Itaú clock installed on the roof of Block B. The clock remained there for about 40 years and became a nighttime landmark for people traveling through central Belo Horizonte. In 2019, Itaú decided to remove the structure following changes to advertising regulations and a dispute with the condominium administration. The removal followed a court-mediated agreement in which the bank agreed to pay outstanding amounts related to its use of the tower's roof.

The complex also housed cultural and nightlife venues. Matriz, a bar and concert venue located inside the JK Building, became one of Belo Horizonte's leading stages for independent music. Its owners announced the venue's closure in 2021 after 21 years of operation, citing the difficulty of keeping it open after in-person cultural events were suspended during the COVID-19 pandemic. In 2022, the founders of Matriz opened Casa Matriz in partnership with the Union of Professional Journalists of Minas Gerais, continuing a project that had begun inside the JK Complex.

In 2012, the building appeared in coverage of the film project Operação Sonia Silk. The cooperative project used an apartment in the JK Building as one of its production spaces and planned three independent feature films, including O uivo da gaita, Éden, and the documentary Metamancia.

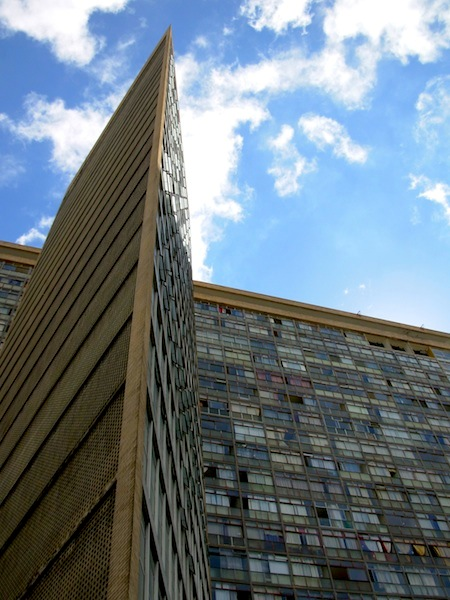
Corner view of the JK Complex in 2010

In 2020, during the COVID-19 pandemic in Brazil, the Viva JK collective gained public attention through large-scale projections on the façade of Block B. Formed in 2019 by residents and friends of the complex, the group used the tower's blank wall for public-health messages, expressions of solidarity, and protest during the first months of social isolation. The projections included newspaper headlines about the pandemic, messages asking people to stay home, tributes to health-care workers, and literary excerpts by João Guimarães Rosa. One projection also became an international human-interest story after a resident used the façade to propose marriage to his girlfriend during the lockdown.

The administration of the complex became a recurring subject in the local press. Maria Lima das Graças, known in the building as "Doutora Graça" ("Dr. Graça"), managed the condominium for decades as its síndica, (Note: In the context of a Brazilian condominium, the síndico or síndica is the person elected or appointed to manage the condominium. The position is closer to that of a condominium manager or board president than a building superintendent.) and was profiled by O Tempo in 2016, by which time she had held the position for 32 years. In 2025, the Public Prosecutor's Office of Minas Gerais filed suit in connection with the conservation of the protected property, and a court hearing was scheduled to address alleged failures to preserve the complex. Maria Lima das Graças died in March 2026 at the age of 78.

In 2026, journalist and podcaster Chico Felitti released the investigative podcast A Síndica (The Condominium Manager), centered on Maria Lima das Graças and her long tenure at the head of the complex. The five-episode series examined her administration and the internal disputes surrounding the management of one of Belo Horizonte's largest residential buildings. In February 2026, a Minas Gerais court convicted Manoel Gonçalves de Freitas Neto, then the síndico, in a proceeding concerning the duties to preserve the protected property. The ruling also imposed a fine on the condominium. The case involving Maria Lima das Graças was separated from the proceeding and placed under seal.

== Gallery ==
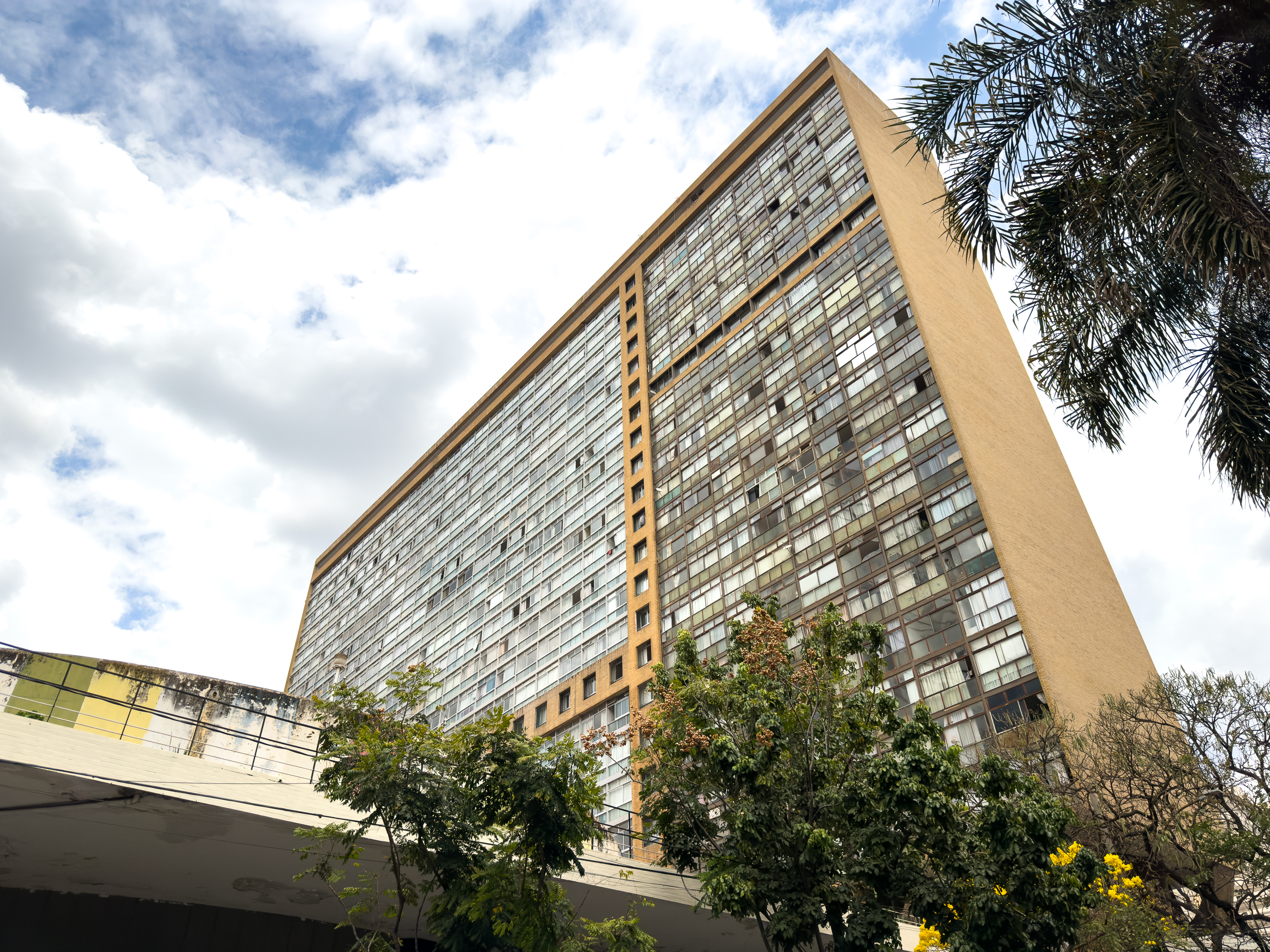
The complex in 2025

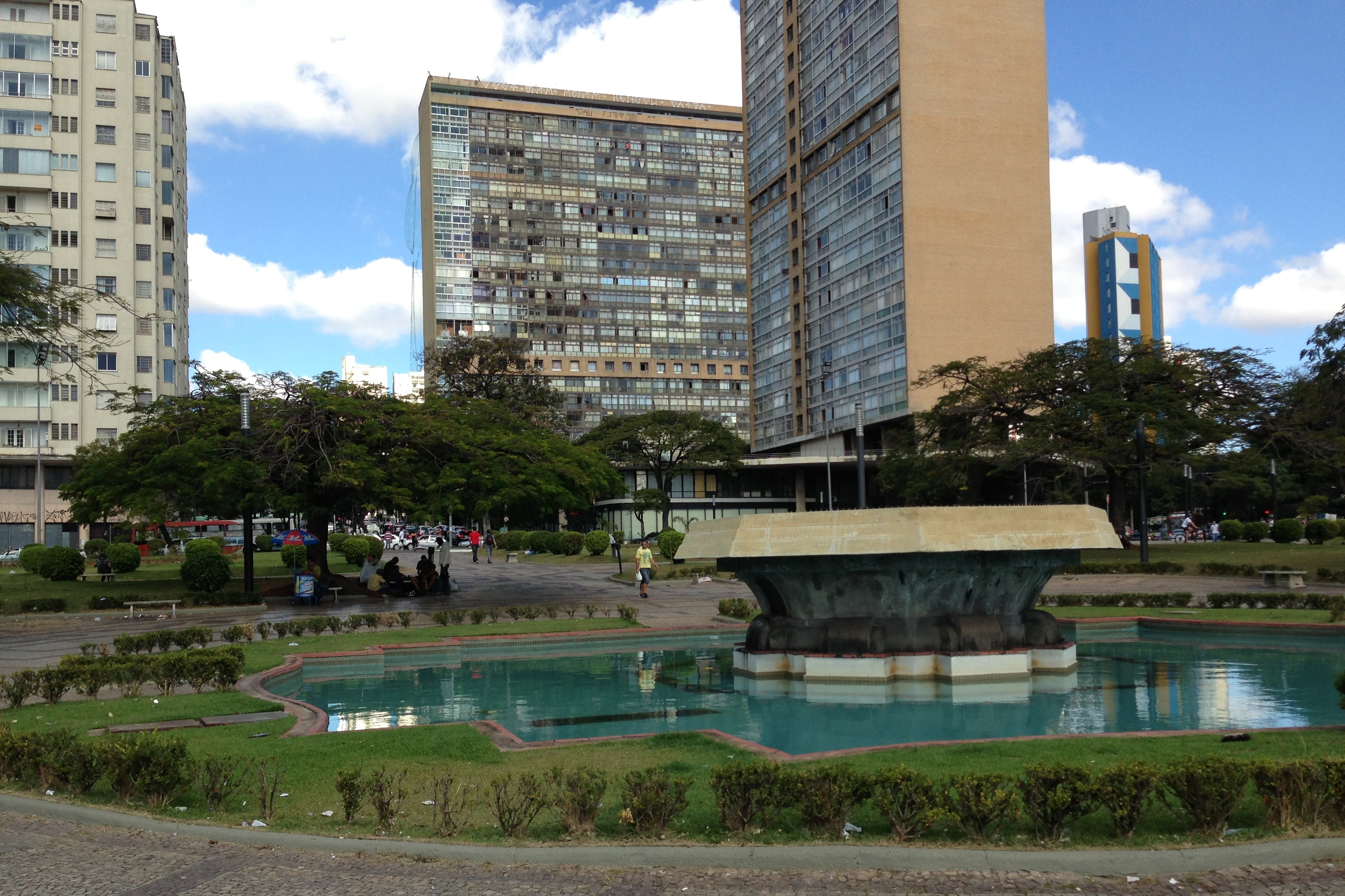
The buildings seen from Praça Raul Soares

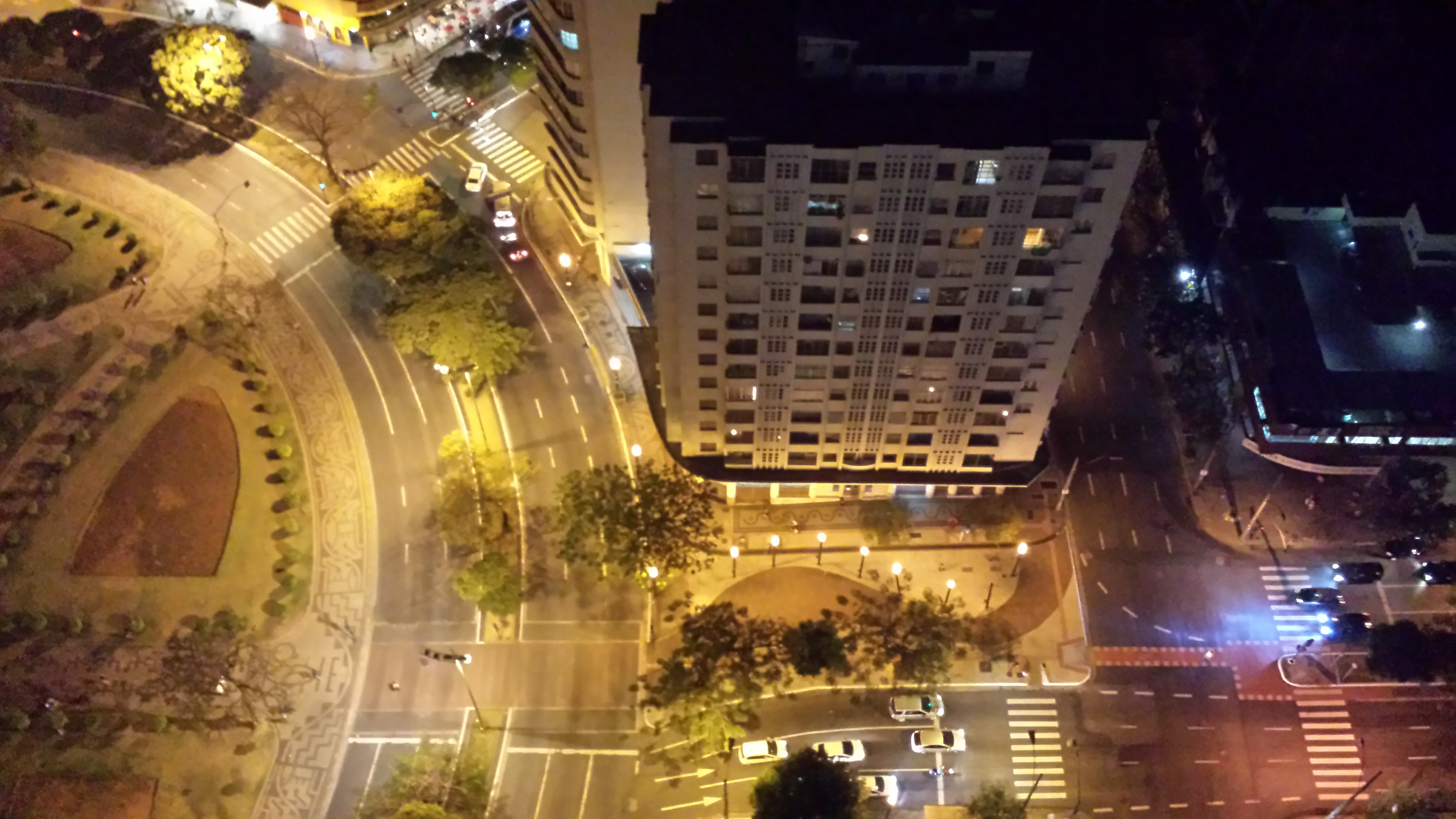
Nighttime view of Belo Horizonte from the JK Complex

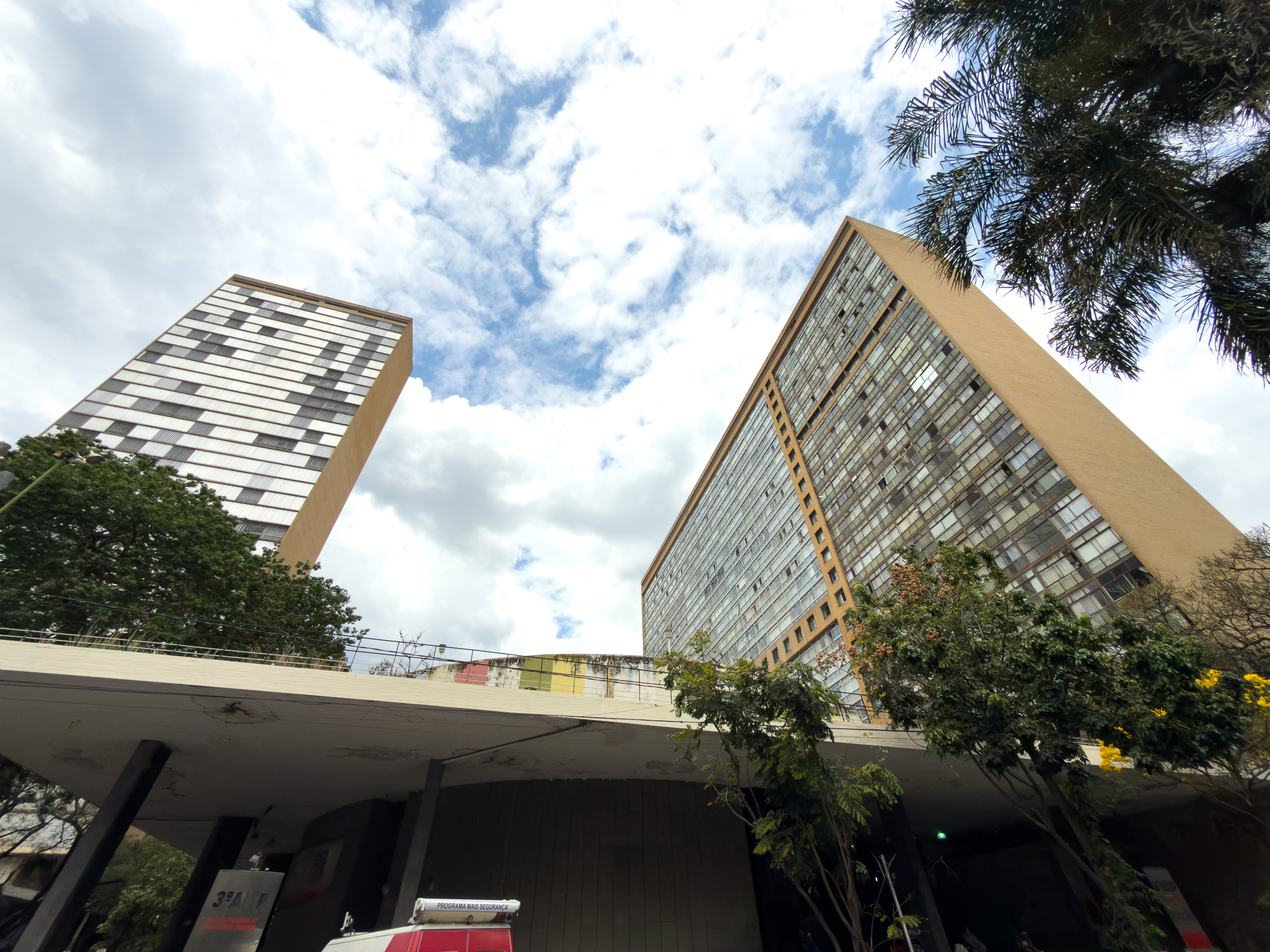
The two-block complex in 2025

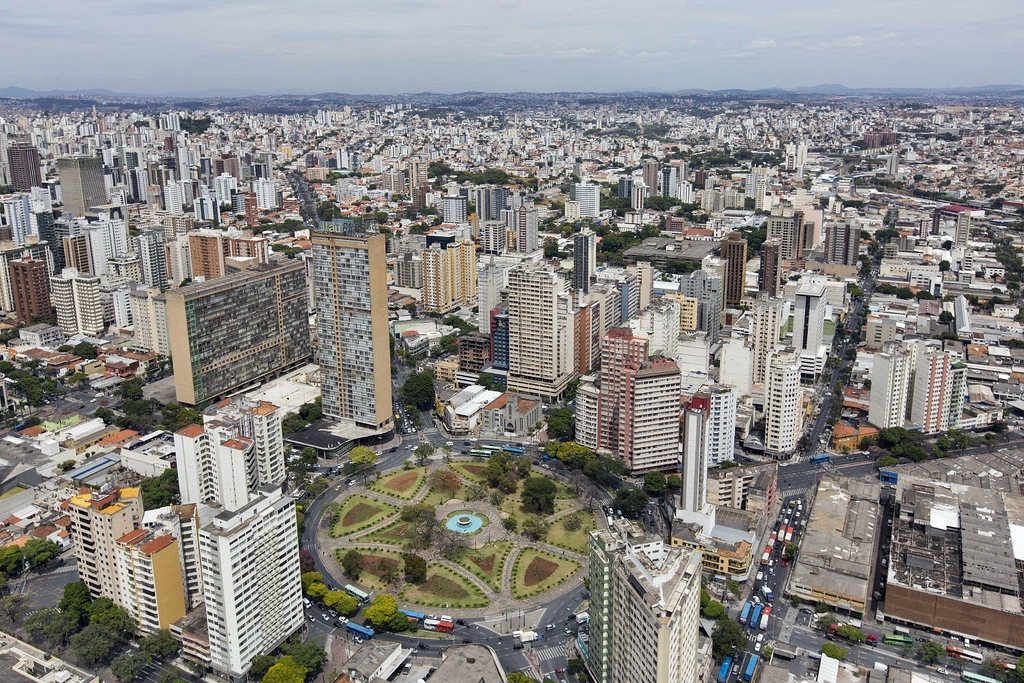
Central Belo Horizonte, with Praça Raul Soares near the center of the image and the JK Complex visible at upper left

== See also ==
- List of Oscar Niemeyer works — overview of buildings and projects designed by Niemeyer
- Pampulha Modern Ensemble — Niemeyer's earlier project in Belo Horizonte, associated with Juscelino Kubitschek
- Modern architecture — the architectural movement to which the complex belongs
- Niemeyer Building — another important residential building by Niemeyer in Belo Horizonte
