= Montreal Building =

- Edifício Montreal
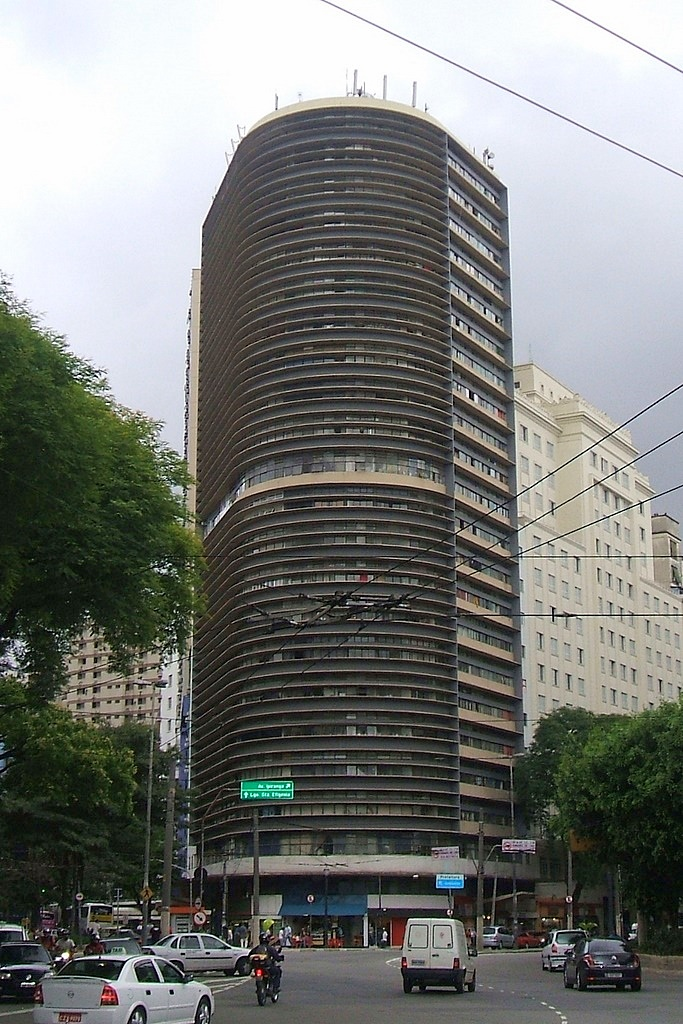
- North façade of Edifício Montreal

- Location within São Paulo Location within Brazil
- Alternative names: Condomínio Edifício Montreal

General information
- Architectural style: Modernist
- Location: Avenida Ipiranga, 1284, Centro, São Paulo, Brazil
- Coordinates: 23.54011°S 46.63667°W
- Groundbreaking: 1951
- Opened: 1954
- Renovated: 2004
- Client: Banco Nacional Imobiliário, Companhia Nacional de Investimentos

Technical details
- Floor count: 23
- Floor area: 41,000 square metres (440,000 ft^{2})

Design and construction
- Architects: Oscar Niemeyer, Carlos Lemos

The Montreal Building (Portuguese: Edifício Montreal) is an apartment building in São Paulo, Brazil. It was designed by the architect Oscar Niemeyer (1907–2012) and executed by Carlos Lemos (1925–2025). The building was designed in 1950, construction began in 1951, and opened in 1954. It was one of several buildings in São Paulo commissioned by the Banco Nacional Imobiliário (National Real Estate Bank) to meet the demand for dense, high-rise residential structures in the center of the city. The building was the first of Niemeyer's large-scale works in São Paulo; it predates the Copan, Triângulo e Califórnia buildings. Basic units in the building sold for ₢$280,000 at the time of its opening.

The Montreal Building sits on a narrow, irregular corner of Ipiranga and Cásper Líbero avenues opposite of Praça Alfredo Lessa. Units in the building range from 36 square metres (390 ft^{2}) to 48 square metres (520 ft^{2}), many in a trapezoidal floor plan. Units in the building are small and were meant to attract single occupants or small families. The entrance hall features three large panels of mosaics by Emiliano Di Cavalcanti. The pattern of horizontal fins on the north façade of the building closely resembles that of the Banco do Estado de Minas Gerais, designed in the same period by Niemeyer. The brise soleil facing avenues Ipiranga and Cásper Líbero were removed in a 2004 renovation. Edifício Montreal is a listed building by the Municipal Council for the Preservation of Historical, Cultural and Environmental City of São Paulo (SPHAN).
