= Praça Raul Soares =

Square in Belo Horizonte, Minas Gerais, Brazil

- Public square
- {{{other_names}}}
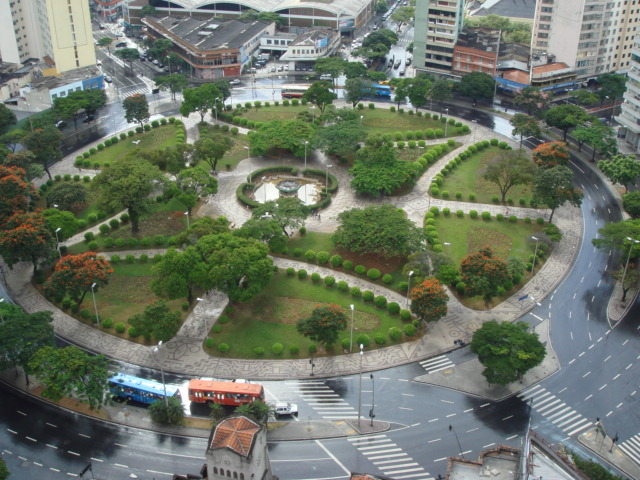
- Raul Sores square in Below Horizonte, Brazil
- Design: Érico de Paula
- Opened: 1936
- Surface: Stone
- Location: Belo Horizonte, Brazil
- Interactive map of Praça Raul Soares
- Coordinates: 19°55′21.87″S 43°56′42.41″W

The Praça Raul Soares (English: Raul Soares Square) is a major square of Belo Horizonte, Brazil. The square is named in honor of Raul Soares de Moura, former governor of Minas Gerais.

It is situated at the confluence of four major avenues: Amazonas, Augusto de Lima, Bias Fortes and Olegário Maciel.

In 2008, the square underwent revitalization that was funded through the municipal Participatory Budgeting program and cost the equivalent of $2,600,000 U.S. dollars. The flowerbeds, sidewalks, large fountain and drinking fountains were restored. The project aimed to give more security and accessibility to the flow of pedestrians. Compromised trees were replaced, lampposts were resized, and advertisements were removed or adjusted in accordance with the appropriate codes. The walks were improved to provide easy access for the disabled and the visually impaired.

Praça Raul Soares is listed by IEPHA (Instituto Estadual do Patrimônio Histórico e Artístico de Minas Gerais).
