= Edifício Copan =

Skyscraper in São Paulo, Brazil

Copan Building
- Edifício Copan
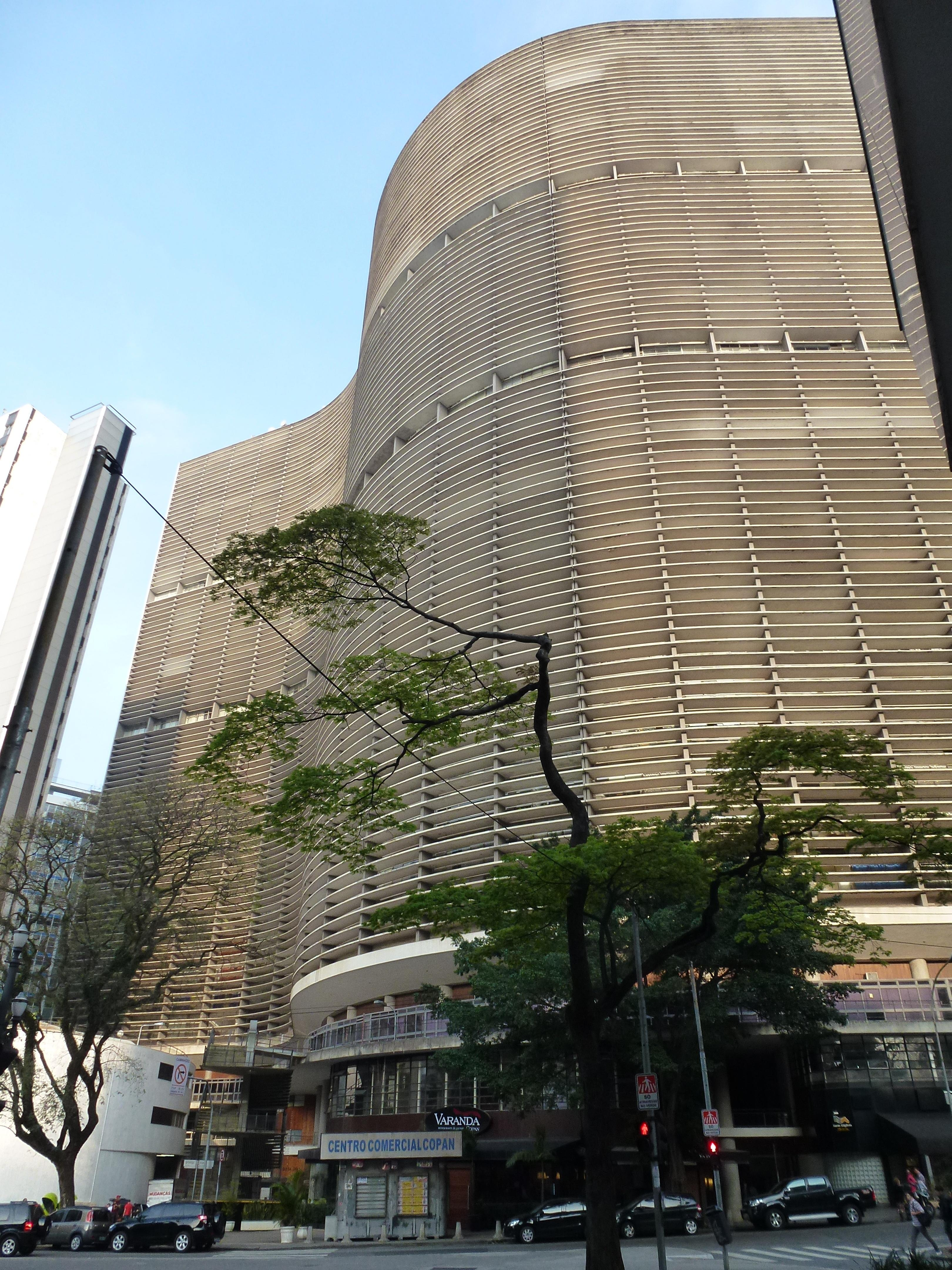
- Edifício Copan in downtown São Paulo

- Location within São Paulo Location within Brazil

General information
- Location: Brazil
- Coordinates: 23°32′47.82″S 46°38′39.75″W
- Current tenants: 2,038
- Construction started: 1952
- Completed: 1966
- Client: Companhia Pan-Americana de Hotéis e Turismo

Height
- Height: 118.44 m (388.6 ft)

Technical details
- Floor count: 42

Design and construction
- Architects: Oscar Niemeyer, Carlos Alberto Cerqueira Lemos

Other information
- Number of rooms: 1,160
- Parking: 221

Website
- www.copansp.com.br

The Edifício Copan (Copan Building), or just Copan, is one of the most important and emblematic buildings in the city of São Paulo, located at number 200 Avenida Ipiranga, in the city center, and was inaugurated in 1966. It is one of the symbols of modern Brazilian architecture, designed by architect Oscar Niemeyer with structural design by engineer Joaquim Cardozo, aiming to celebrate the Fourth Centenary of the city of São Paulo. The work, however, only began in 1957, with some changes and carried out with the help of Carlos Lemos.

The building has the largest reinforced concrete structure in the country, 115 meters high (377 ft.), 32 floors and 120 thousand square meters of built area, divided into six blocks, with a total of 1,160 apartments of varying sizes, according to an estimate of five thousand residents from different social classes and more than seventy commercial establishments.

== Design, construction and name ==
The building was designed by Oscar Niemeyer's office in São Paulo; Niemeyer was personally responsible for the building's famous sinuous façade. The idea was a building open to a mixed cross-section of Brazilian society. The original project envisioned two buildings, the other being a hotel, but in the end only the residential building was built.

Construction began in 1952 and, following some interruptions, was completed in 1966. It is one of the largest buildings in Brazil.

The building's name is an acronym for its original developer, Companhia Pan-Americana de Hotéis e Turismo (Portuguese for "Pan-American Hotels and Tourism Company").

== Facilities ==
Currently, the building has 1,160 apartments, ranging from small studios to large three-bedroom units, and 2,038 residents, served by 20 elevators and 221 underground parking spaces. The ground floor is home to 72 businesses and establishments including (since the 1990s) an evangelical church, a travel agency, a bookstore, and four restaurants. Its site is 10,572.80 square meters (113,805 square feet) in area.

Due to the large number of residents, the Brazilian postal service assigned the building its own postal code ("CEP"): 01046-925. The current condominium has over 100 employees to serve residents and to conduct maintenance.

Niemeyer's original design contained a park outside the building, a second park in an open area of the first floor, and a roof-deck. The park outside is now used by a bank building; the first floor park and roof-deck are closed.

Since 2014 the entire building has been covered by a transparent blue-black drape, to protect pedestrians from the facade's loose mosaic tiles. A project to repair and replace the building's 72 million exterior tiles is currently under consideration.

== In popular culture ==
The Copan Building has inspired writers, filmmakers, photographers, and other artists from all over the world. A short story collection titled Arca sem Noé - Histórias do Edifício Copan ("Ark without Noah - Stories from the Copan Building"), by Brazilian author Regina Rheda, was published in Portuguese in 1994 and won a 1995 Jabuti prize in Brazil. It has also been published in English as Stories From the Copan Building, within the volume First World Third Class and Other Tales of the Global Mix (University of Texas Press).

The Copan Building appeared on the second episode of The Amazing Race 9 and was the site of a task in which contestants had to run up one of the building's fire escapes and rappel down an exterior wall.

The building is available to build in the 2013 game SimCity.

== Gallery ==
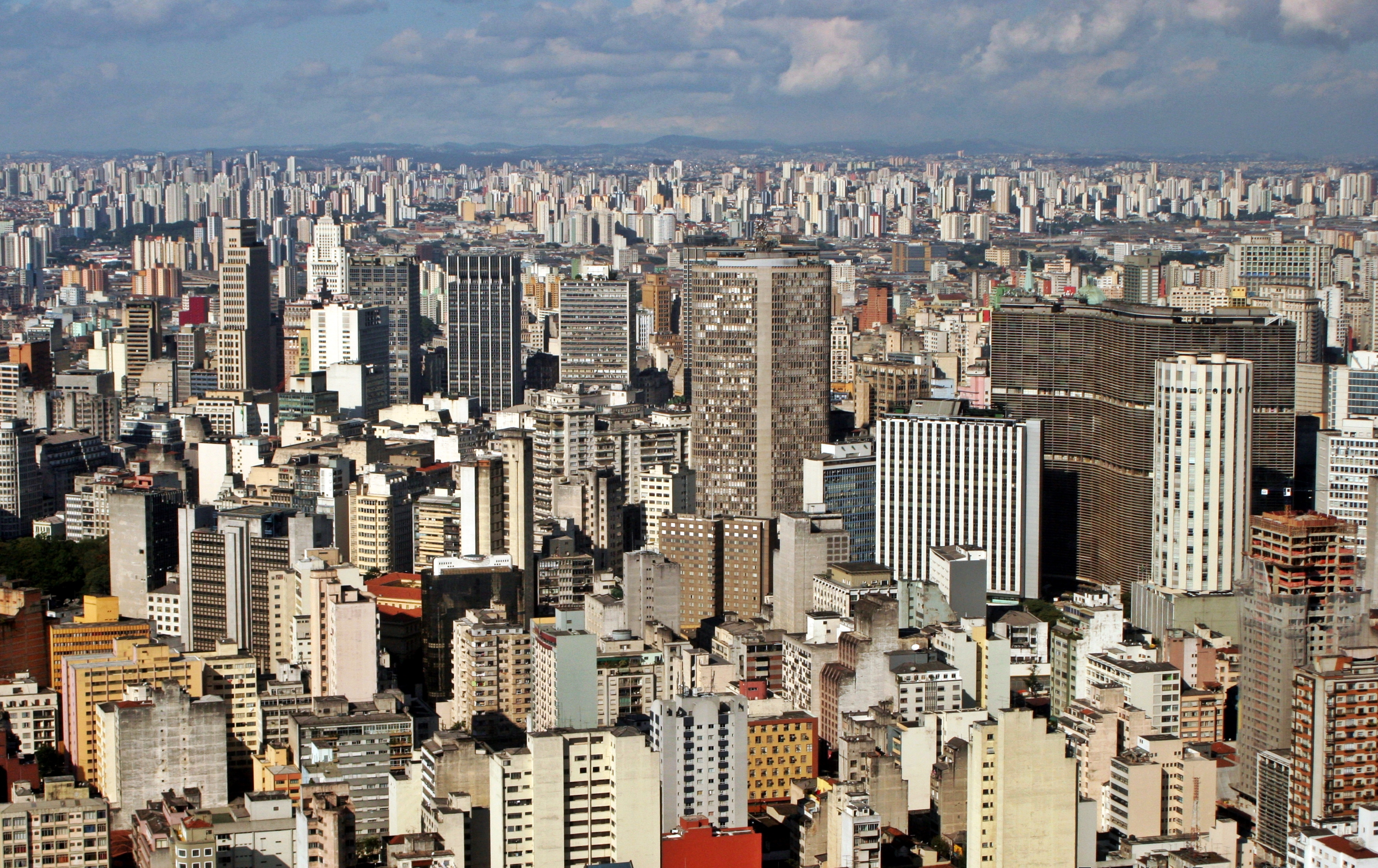
The Edifício Copan in its urban context

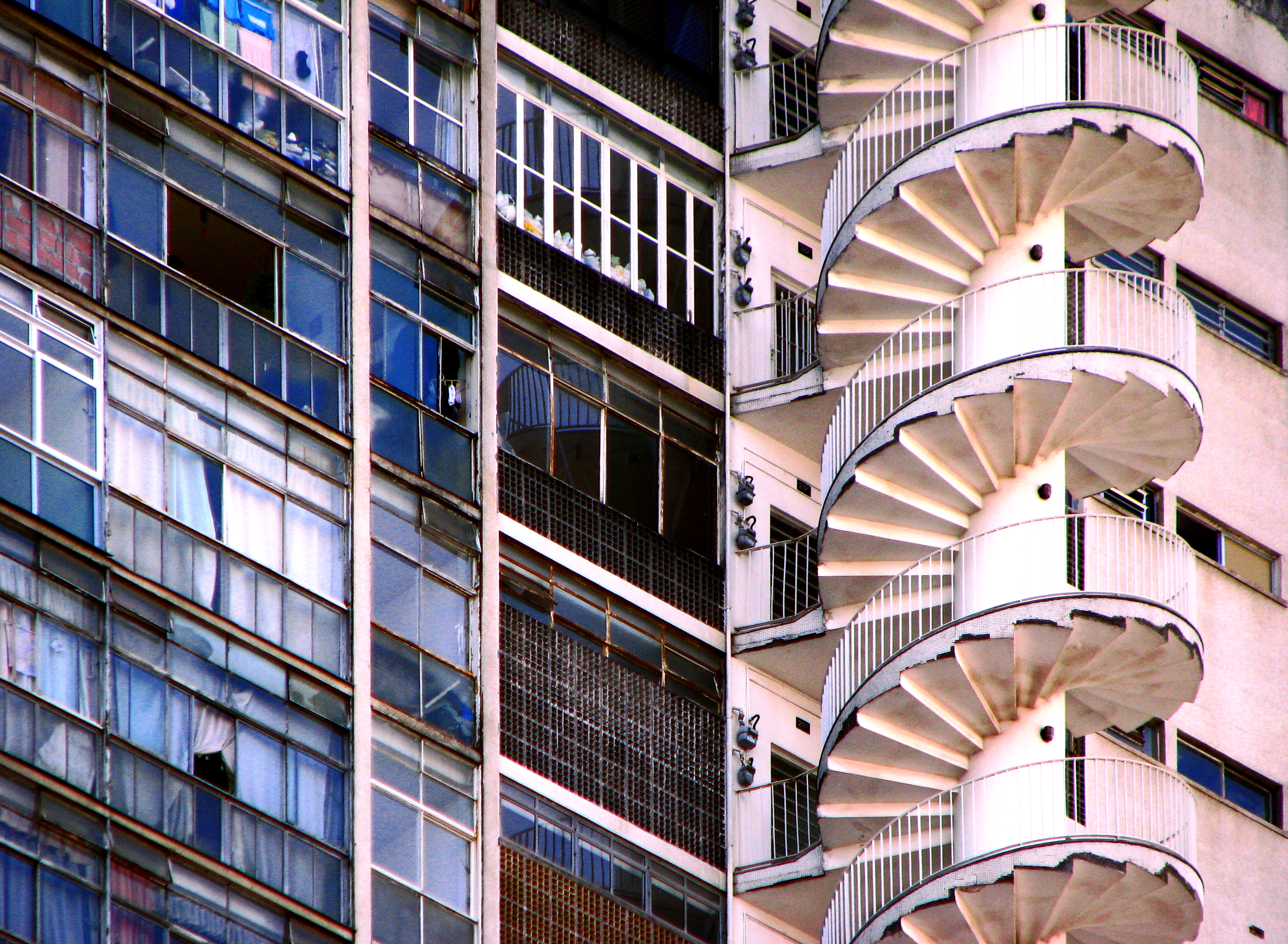
Fire staircases

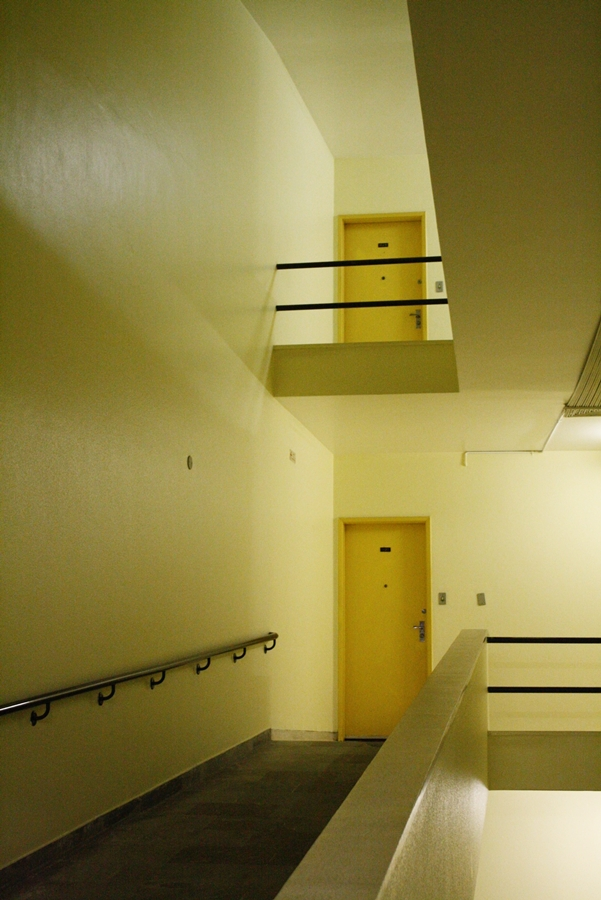
Interior

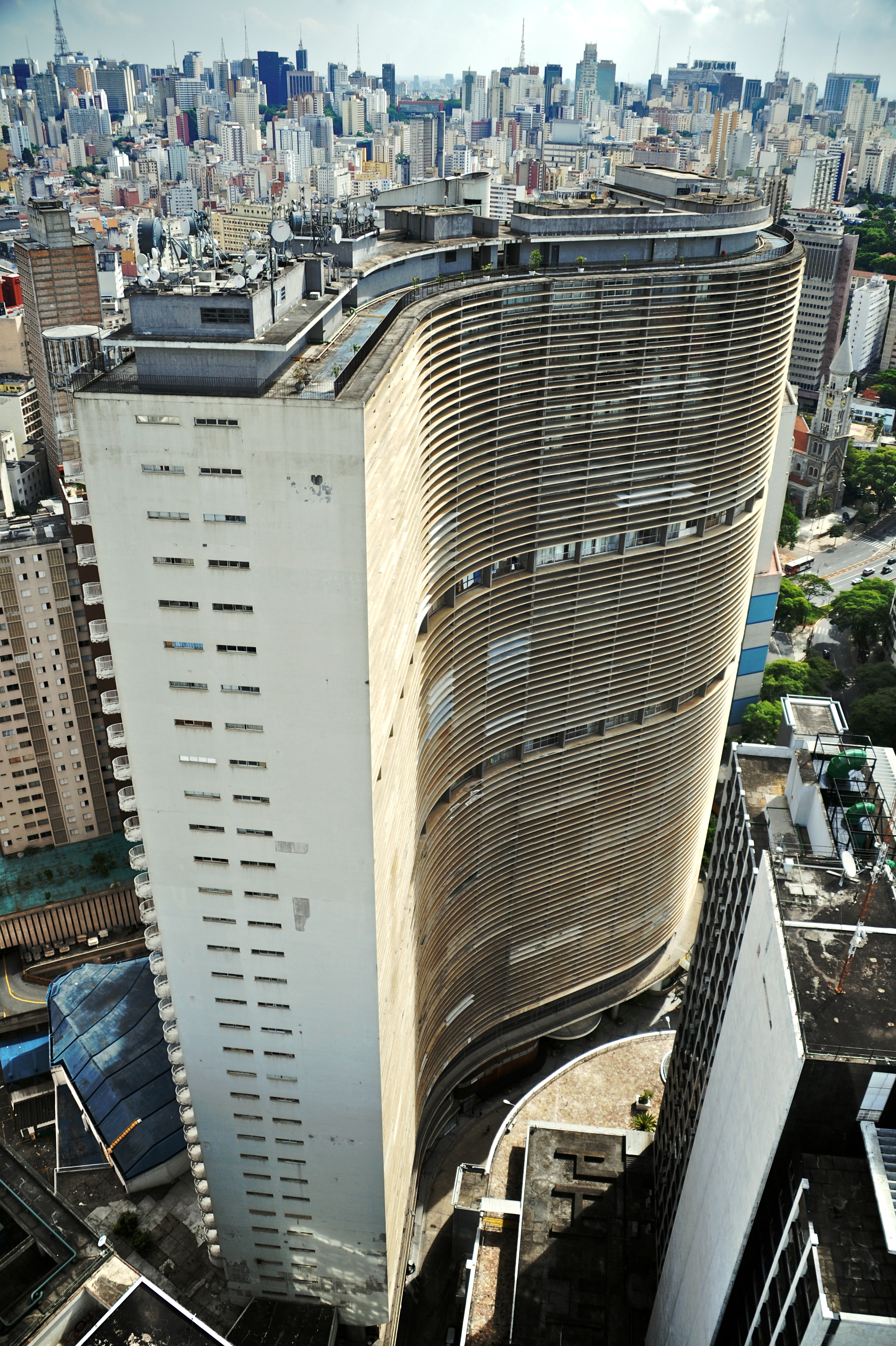
Copan seen from above

== See also ==
- Regent International Center, also S-shaped building, largest apartment building in the world by capacity.
- List of Oscar Niemeyer works

== Bibliography ==
- "Stories from the Copan Building" in FIRST WORLD THIRD CLASS AND OTHER TALES OF THE GLOBAL MIX, by Regina Rheda. Austin: University of Texas Press, 2005.
- Arca sem Noé - Histórias do Edifício Copan, by Regina Rheda. Second edition. Rio: Record, 2010. Short stories in Portuguese.
