= Joaquim Cardozo =

Brazilian structural engineer and poet

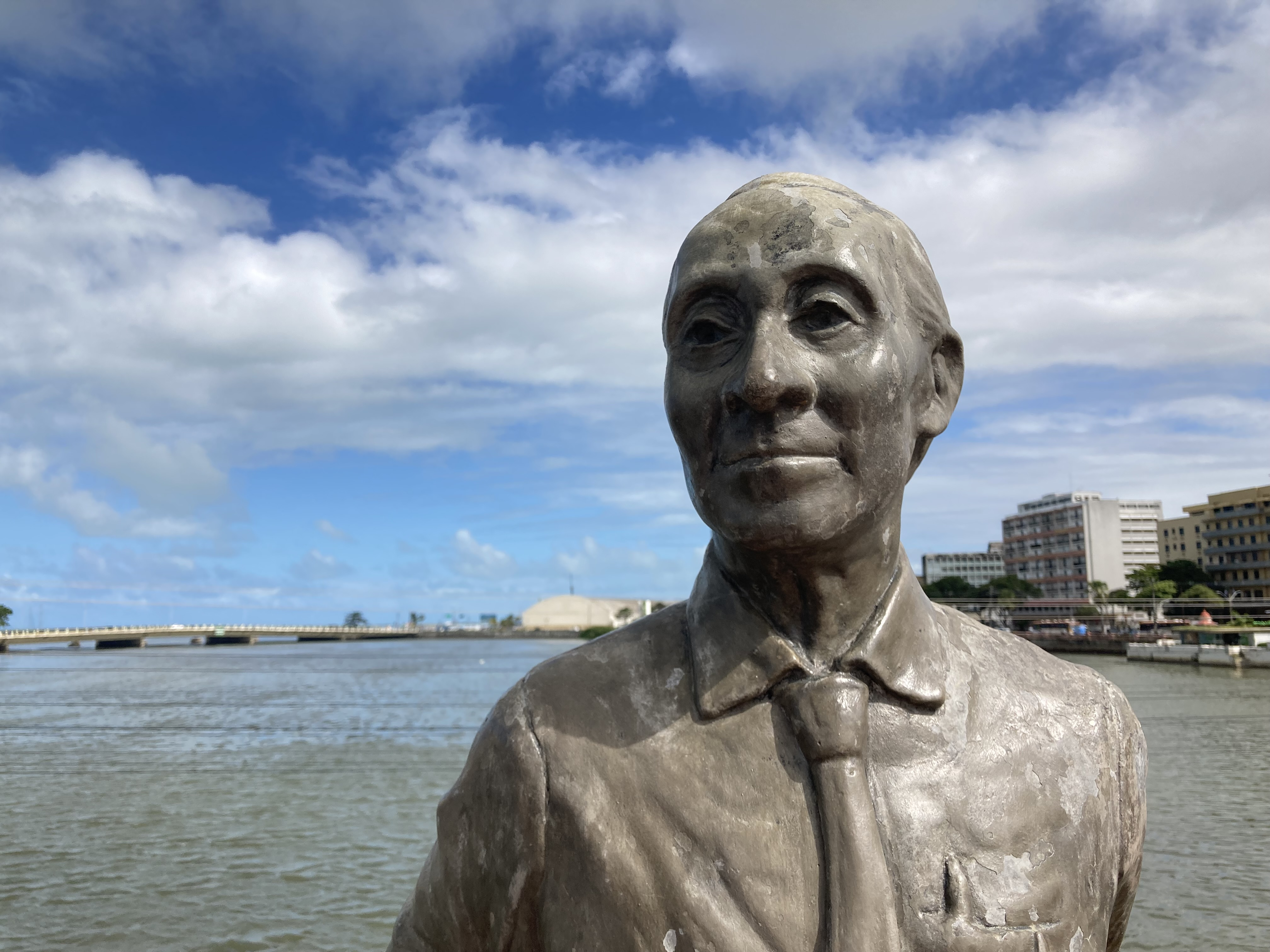
- Born: 26 August 1897; Recife, Brazil
- Died: 5 February 1978 (aged 80); Olinda, Pernambuco, Brazil
- Parent(s): José Antônio Cardozo, Elvira Moreira Cardozo
- Engineering career
- Discipline: Structural engineer

Joaquim Maria Moreira Cardozo (August 26, 1897 – November 4, 1978), known as Joaquim Cardozo, was a Brazilian structural engineer, poet, short story writer, playwright, university professor, translator, editor of art and architecture magazines, designer, illustrator, caricaturist, and art critic. He was a polyglot, knowing about fifteen languages.

Cardozo moved to Rio de Janeiro in 1940 and worked with the architect Oscar Niemeyer on some of his major works, including on the Pampulha Modern Ensemble which is now a UNESCO World Heritage Site. Other works include the Monument to the Dead of World War II. Niemeyer described Cardozo as "the most cultured Brazilian there was".

Among his most famous poems is the 1924 Recife morto.

== Biography ==
=== Poet ===
His first poems date back to 1924; however, the first book Poems only appeared in 1947 due to the insistence of his friends. Joaquim Cardozo, who had a prodigious memory, knew all his poems by heart and did not modify them, not even a single comma, when he recited them publicly at different periods.

I'm not really a poet. My life is full of gaps in poetry. — Joaquim Cardozo

He lived with modernist poets, such as Manuel Bandeira and João Cabral de Melo Neto, having published several books between 1946 and 1975, using as themes mainly his native Recife and the Brazilian Northeast. He was also a translator and art critic. He held Chair 39 at the Academia Pernambucana de Letras. Elected on February 18, 1975, he took office on September 6, 1977, one year before his death.

In total, eleven books authored by him were published, of which the inaugural Poems stand out, which had a preface by the poet Carlos Drummond de Andrade, one of his greatest admirers, as well as two of his theatrical works, O Coronel de Macambira and De uma Noite de Festa, and his Complete Poems. A Lit Book and Nine Dark Songs was his last book, published posthumously. His work in the press includes time at Diario de Pernambuco as a cartoonist, and stints as collaborator and director of Revista do Norte, Revista do Patrimônio Histórico and the magazines Para Todos and Módulo.

=== Engineer ===
I do not visualize any incompatibility between poetry and architecture. The structures planned by modern architects are true poetry. To work to carry out these projects is to realize a poetry. — Joaquim Cardozo

Specializing in structural calculations, he was notable for his collaboration with architect Oscar Niemeyer in the construction of Brasília and the Pampulha Modern Ensemble. His calculation assumptions allowed challenging works in the federal capital such as the Palácio do Planalto, the Palácio da Alvorada and the Metropolitan Cathedral to barely touch the ground, with delicate bases, a feat considered even more impressive taking into account the structural strength of concrete at the time, five times smaller than today. He was once praised as "the most cultured Brazilian that existed" by his close friend and colleague, Oscar Niemeyer.

After completing secondary school at Ginásio Pernambucano, Joaquim Cardozo began studying at the School of Engineering of Pernambuco in 1915. He graduated fifteen years later due to his father's death and economic difficulties, during which time he served in the military and worked as a surveyor. In the year he was to complete his engineering course, he became a draftsman for irrigation projects and the drilling of tubular wells for the Government of Pernambuco, alongside German engineer Von Tilling. After Von Tilling's death, still a student, Joaquim Cardozo was put in charge of the irrigation project for one of the islands of the São Francisco River. Subsequently, he performed the calculations for the vertical parabolic curves of the first bus station with concrete paving in the Northeast, in Recife.

From 1931, after graduating, he worked at the State Department of Roads and Public Works as a road engineer. In 1934, Joaquim Cardozo joined architect Luiz Nunes's team, specially hired to organize the Directorate of Architecture and Construction, the first governmental institution in Brazil created for this purpose. He was also a professor at the School of Engineering and one of the founders of the School of Fine Arts of Pernambuco, now parts of the Federal University of Pernambuco. A pioneer of modern architecture, Cardozo renewed the structural design of reinforced concrete and calculation methods, contributing to the evolution of civil engineering. He taught until 1939, the year he faced repressive measures from the Estado Novo regime for his criticisms of government procedures in architecture and engineering. He then moved to Rio de Janeiro, where he partnered with Oscar Niemeyer.

The most significant architectural works based on Cardozo's structural calculations include the Cathedral of Brasília, the National Congress, the Palácio do Planalto, the Supreme Federal Court Palace, the Palácio da Alvorada, the Itamaraty Palace, and the Church of Saint Francis of Assisi. In Recife, notable works include the Luiz Nunes Pavilion, currently the headquarters of the IAB (formerly the Institute of Death Verification of the old School of Medicine), and the Olinda Water Tower, dated 1936, which are among the earliest examples of modern Brazilian architecture.

=== Architectural theorist ===
The walls of buildings are the paper on which the pages of history were inscribed, on which messages for the future are still inscribed. And writing these messages is up to the architect. — Joaquim Cardozo

Cardozo's involvement with architecture was not limited to his role as a structural engineer of buildings designed by Oscar Niemeyer, Luiz Nunes and other architects. Cardozo, who became the chair of "Theory and Philosophy of Architecture" at the former Pernambuco School of Fine Arts, left writings that, although extremely summarized, contain significant ideas for the construction of an architectural theory.

=== Personal life ===
Seen as a discreet and egoless man, Joaquim Cardozo had no children and died unmarried, which made it difficult to spread his work.

== Works in collaboration with Niemeyer ==
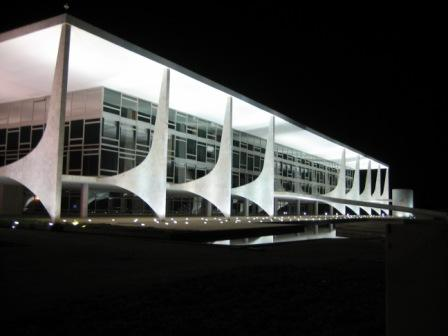
Palácio do Planalto - Brasília, DF

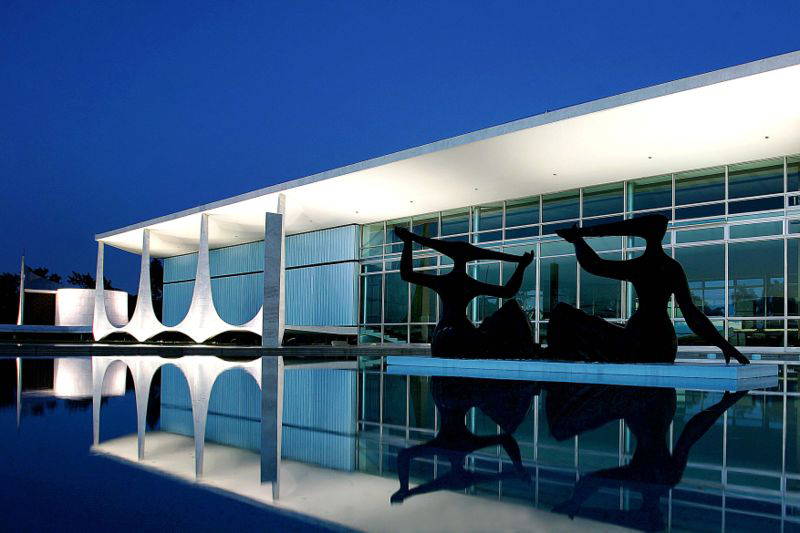
Palácio da Alvorada - Brasília, DF

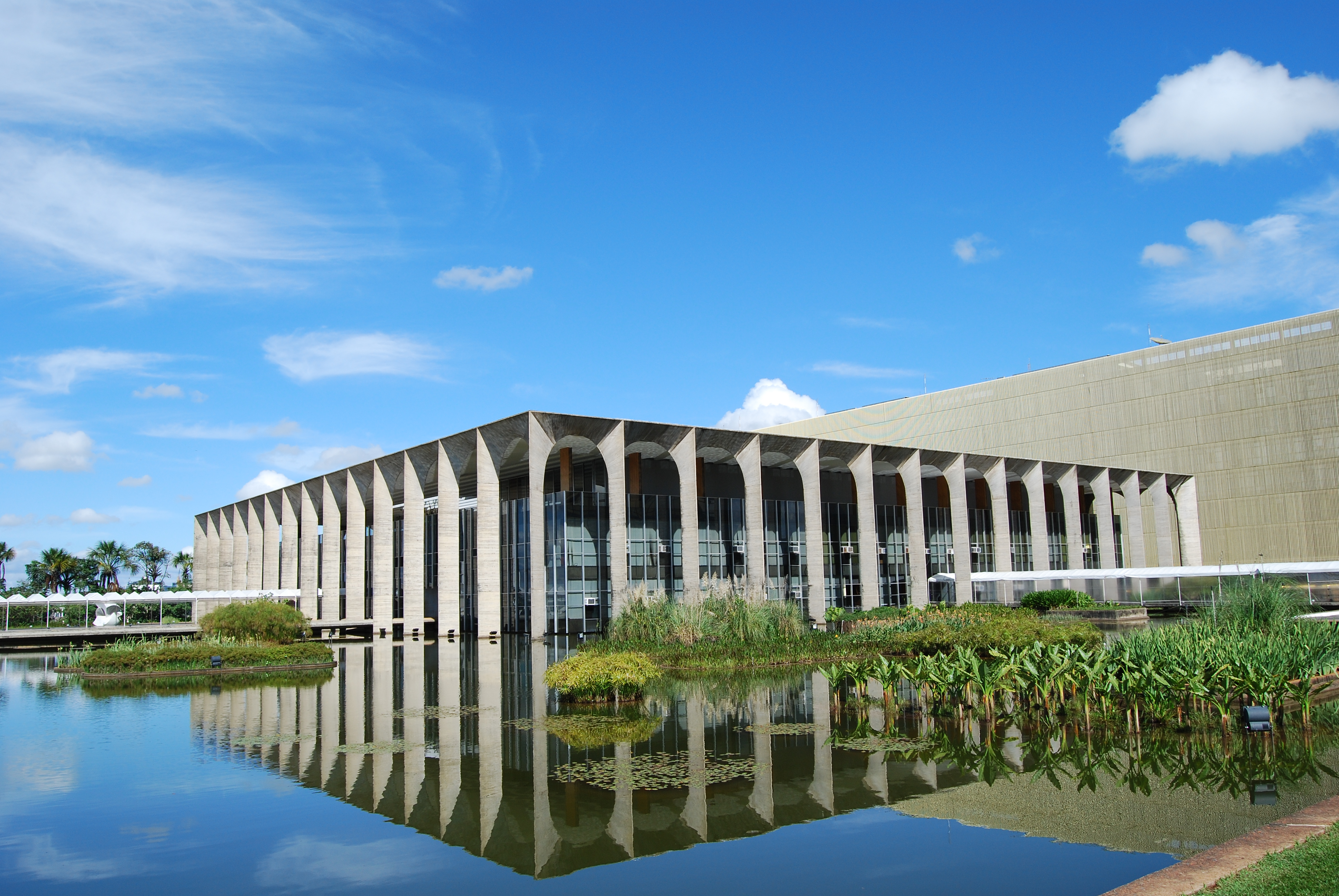
Itamaraty Palace - Brasília, DF
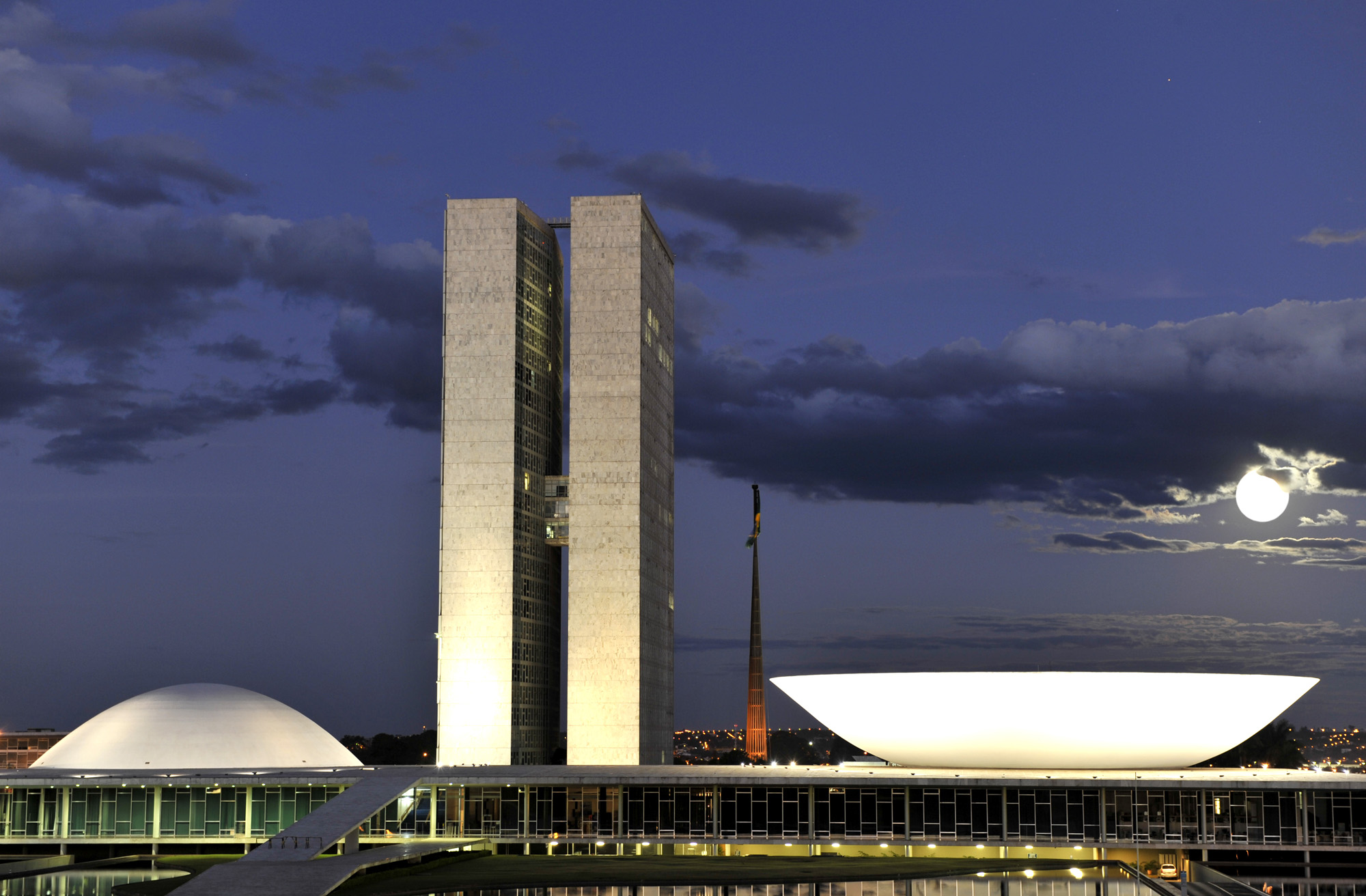
National Congress Palace - Brasília, DF

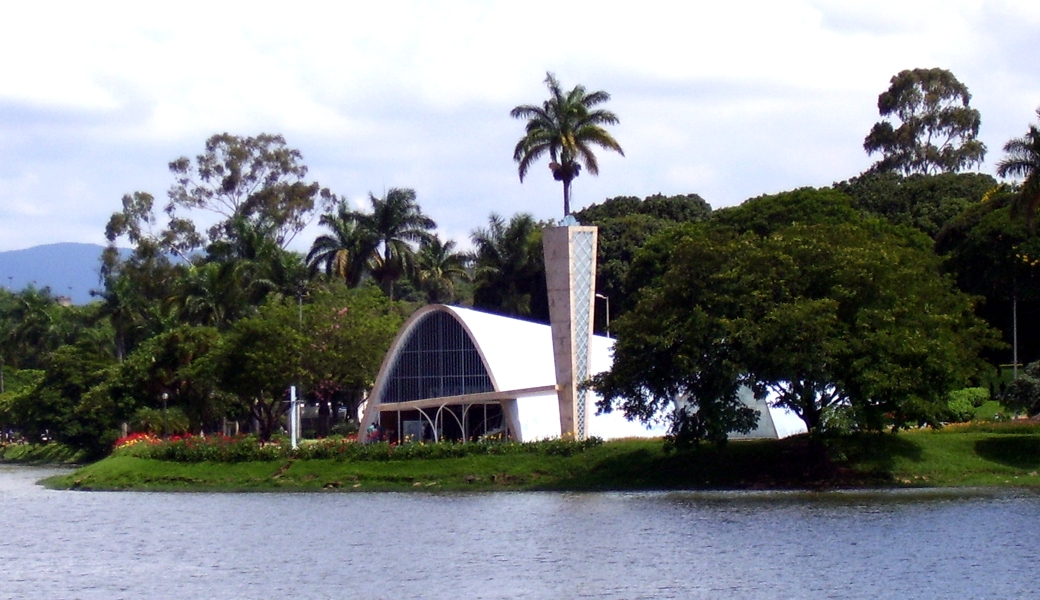
Church of Saint Francis of Assisi, Pampulha at Pampulha in Belo Horizonte, MG

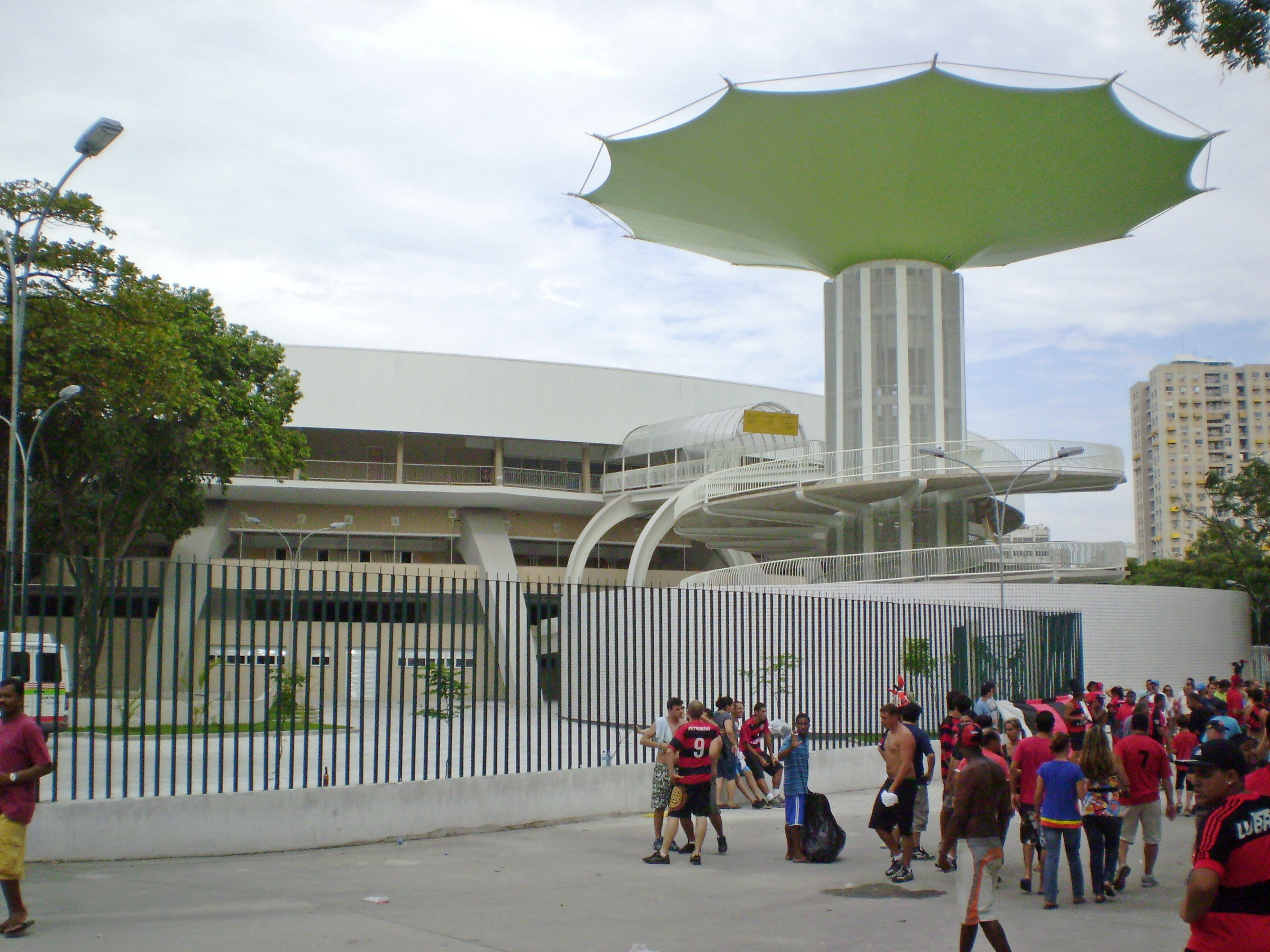
Maracanãzinho - Rio de Janeiro, RJ

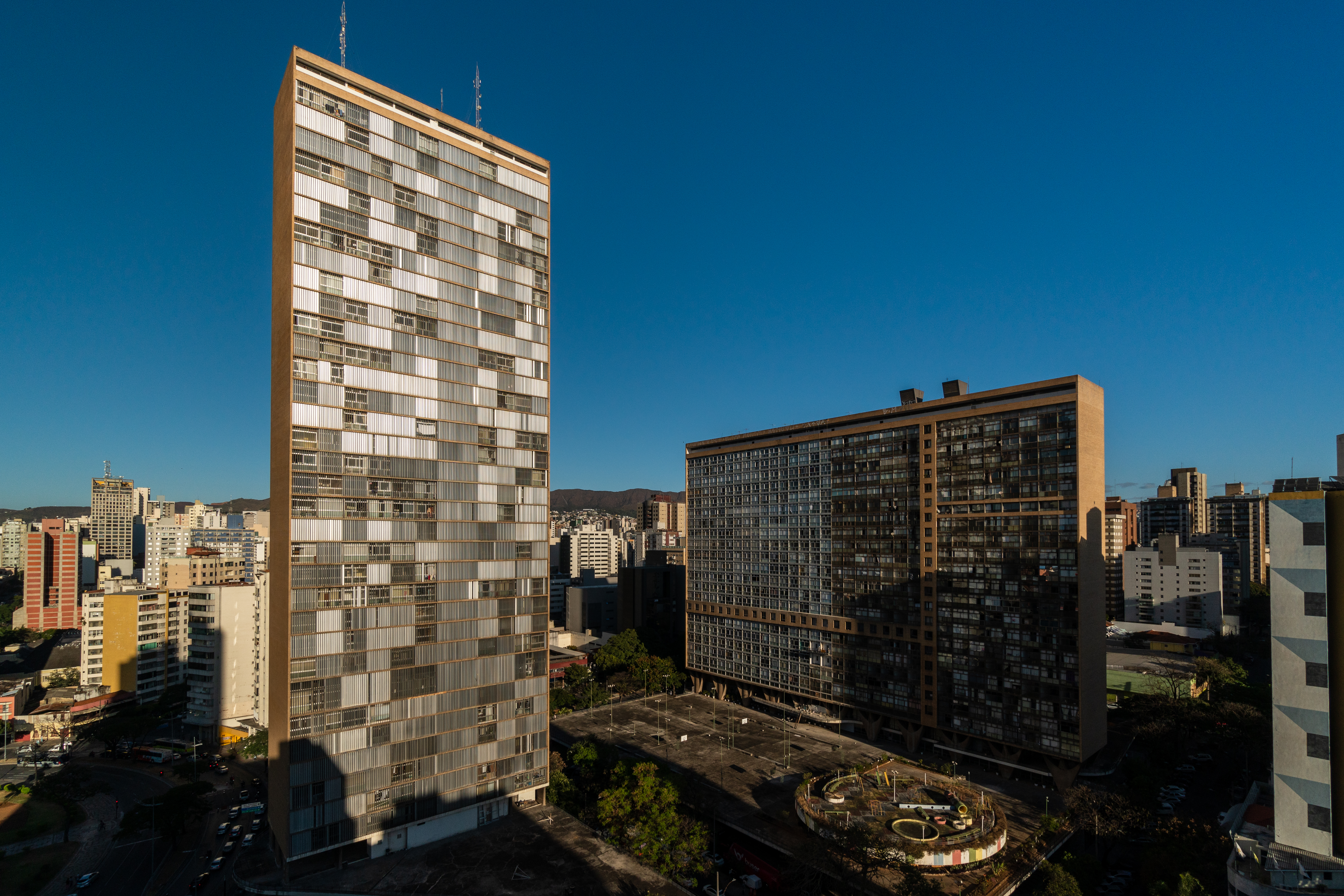
Conjunto JK
