= Artworks damaged, destroyed or stolen during the 8 January Brasília attacks =

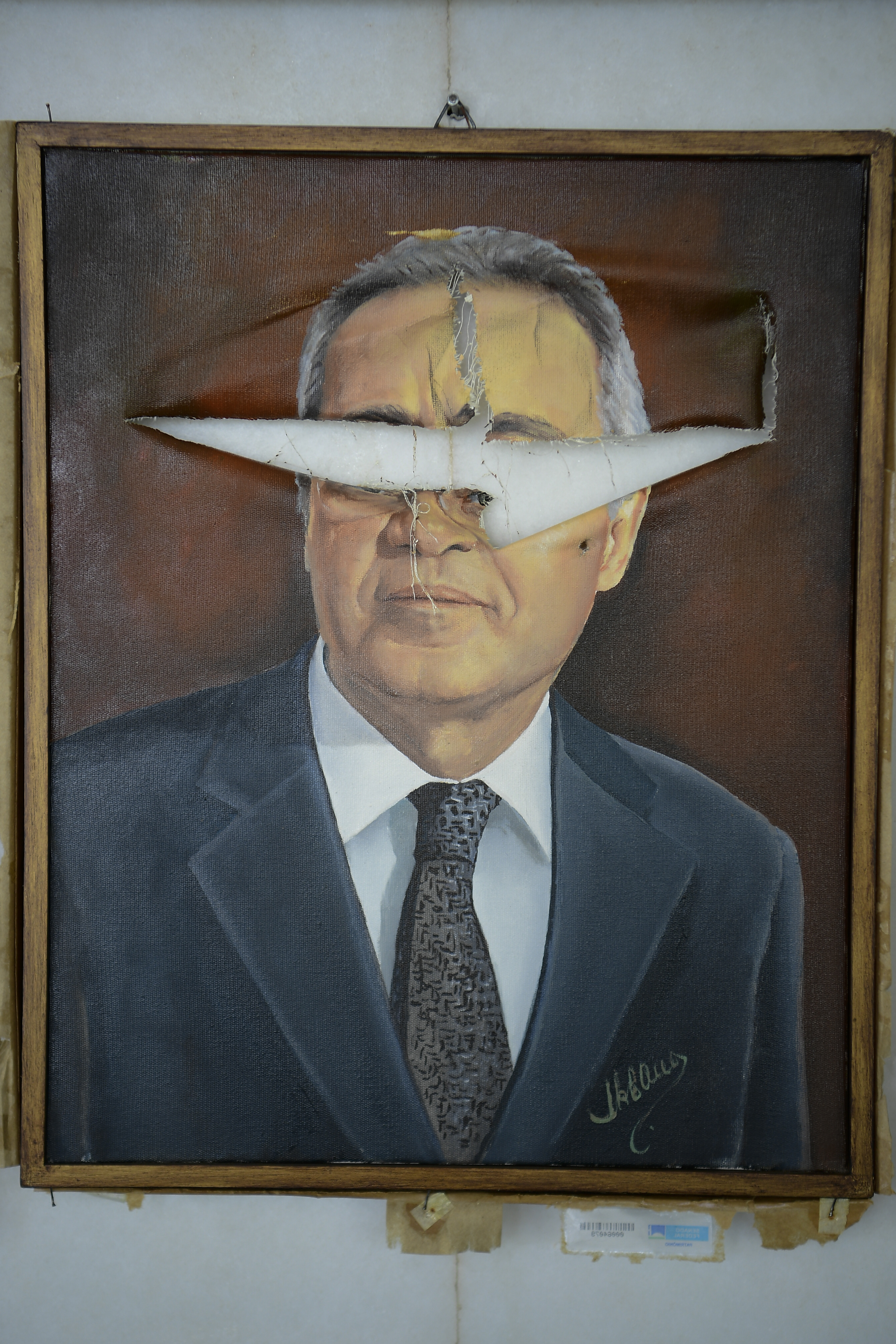
Portrait of Renan Calheiros, from the gallery of official portraits of former presidents of the Senate, in the Main Hall of the house

During the 8 January Brasília attacks, numerous works of art were targeted by supporters of Brazilian former president Jair Bolsonaro.

== Background ==
Brasília, the federal capital of Brazil, is a planned city and its architecture is considered unique in the world. The city was declared a UNESCO World Heritage Site in 1987 and is divided into numbered blocks as well as sectors for specified activities, such as the hotel sector, the banking sector, and the embassy sector. Since it is the seat of government of Brazil, Brasília houses several diplomatic gifts and artworks that are displayed in international and Brazilian art exhibitions, including in the Cultural Complex of the Republic. Government buildings in Brasília are not only themselves works of art due to their modernist architecture, but they also serve as museums, libraries and theaters to officials and the general population who come to the city seeking government services and as visitors.

== Artworks ==
Many artworks were torn apart, shredded, broken, graffitied or simply stolen by the attackers in the assault. Early reports estimate that BRL 9 million (nearly USD 1.7 million) in works of art alone (government buildings not included) were lost in the attack. The following artworks were damaged, destroyed or stolen by the perpetrators:

Works affected by the 8 January Brasília attacks
Work name	Work type	Status	Artist	Creation date	Brazil acquisition date	Notes
Relógio da Corte de Luiz XIV (clock from the court of French King Louis XIV)	Clock	Damaged	André Charles Boulle (Designer) & Balthazar Martinot (Maker)	ca. 17th century		
Bola de futebol assinada por Neymar (soccer ball signed by Neymar)	Soccer ball	Stolen but later recovered	Unknown			
Vaso Húngaro (Hungarian porcelain vase)	Vase	Destroyed	Vausa Val	2008		
Vaso da Dinastia Shang (Shang dynasty vase)	Vase	Destroyed	Unknown	ca. 1,600 BCE		
Ato de assinatura do Projeto da 1ª Constituição (The Act of signature of the Brazilian draft 1st Constitution)	Painting	Damaged	Gustavo Hastoy	1890		
Mobília do antigo Palácio Monroe (Furniture from the former Brazilian Senate building Monroe Palace)	Desks, chair	Damaged	Unknown	ca. 19th century		
Tinteiro do Império do Brasil (Inkwell from the Empire of Brazil)	Inkwell	Damaged	Unknown			
A Bailarina (The Ballerina)	Bronze sculpture	Stolen but later recovered	Victor Brecheret	1920		
Pérola e Concha (Pearl and Shell)	Gold Sculpture	Stolen	Unknown			
Ovo de Avestruz (Ostrich Egg)	Sculpture	Destroyed	Unknown			
As Mulatas (The Mulatto Women)	Painting	Damaged	Di Cavalcanti	1962		
Araguaia	Stained glass panel	Destroyed	Marianne Peretti	1977		
Juscelino Kubitschek's work desk	Desk	Damaged	Oscar Niemeyer and Anna Maria Niemeyer	ca. 1960	ca. 1960	
A Justiça (The Justice)	Granite sculpture	Damaged	Alfredo Ceschiatti	1961		
O Flautista (The Flautist)	Bronze sculpture	Destroyed	Bruno Giorgi	1962		
The Supreme Court Presidential chair	Chair	Damaged	Jorge Zalszupin			
Galhos e Sombras (Sticks and Shadows)	Wooden sculpture	Destroyed	Frans Krajcberg			
Muro Escultório (Sculptural Wall)	Wooden panel	Damaged	Athos Bulcão			
Maria, Maria	Bronze sculpture	Damaged	Sônia Ebling	1980		
Bandeira do Brasil (The Brazilian Flag)	Painting	Damaged	Jorge Eduardo Alves de Souza			
Vênus Apocalíptica (Apocalyptic Venus)	Plaster Sculpture	Damaged	Marta Minujín			
Retrato de José Bonifácio (Portrait of José Bonifácio)	Painting	Damaged	Oscar Pereira da Silva	1922		
Retrato de Guido Mondin (Portrait of Guido Mondin)	Painting	Damaged	Unknown			
Brasão da República (The Brazilian Coat of Arms)	Coat of Arms	Damaged	Unknown			
Tapestry previously owned by Princess Isabel of Brazil	Tapestry	Damaged	Unknown			
Tapestry made by Burle Marx	Tapestry	Damaged	Roberto Burle Marx			
Tapete Persa (Persian Carpet)	Carpet	Damaged	Unknown			
Bust of Ruy Barbosa	Bust	Destroyed	Unknown			
Bust of Joaquim Nabuco	Bust	Destroyed	Unknown			
Rare copy of the Brazilian Constitution of 1988	Book	Stolen but later recovered	Unknown			

== Aftermath ==
After the perpetrators left the buildings, Brazilian Culture Minister Margareth Menezes announced that UNESCO had offered its expert team to help repair restorable artworks. Additionally she asked the National Institute of Historic and Artistic Heritage (Iphan) conservationists and restorers to also help repair the works of art.

On February 19, 2023, Switzerland offered to help Brazil restore the French 17th century clock (made by Balthazar Martinot and targeted by a Bolsonaro supporter during the attacks) in a partnership with Swiss watchmaker company Audemars Piguet, which was accepted by the Brazilian Culture ministry.

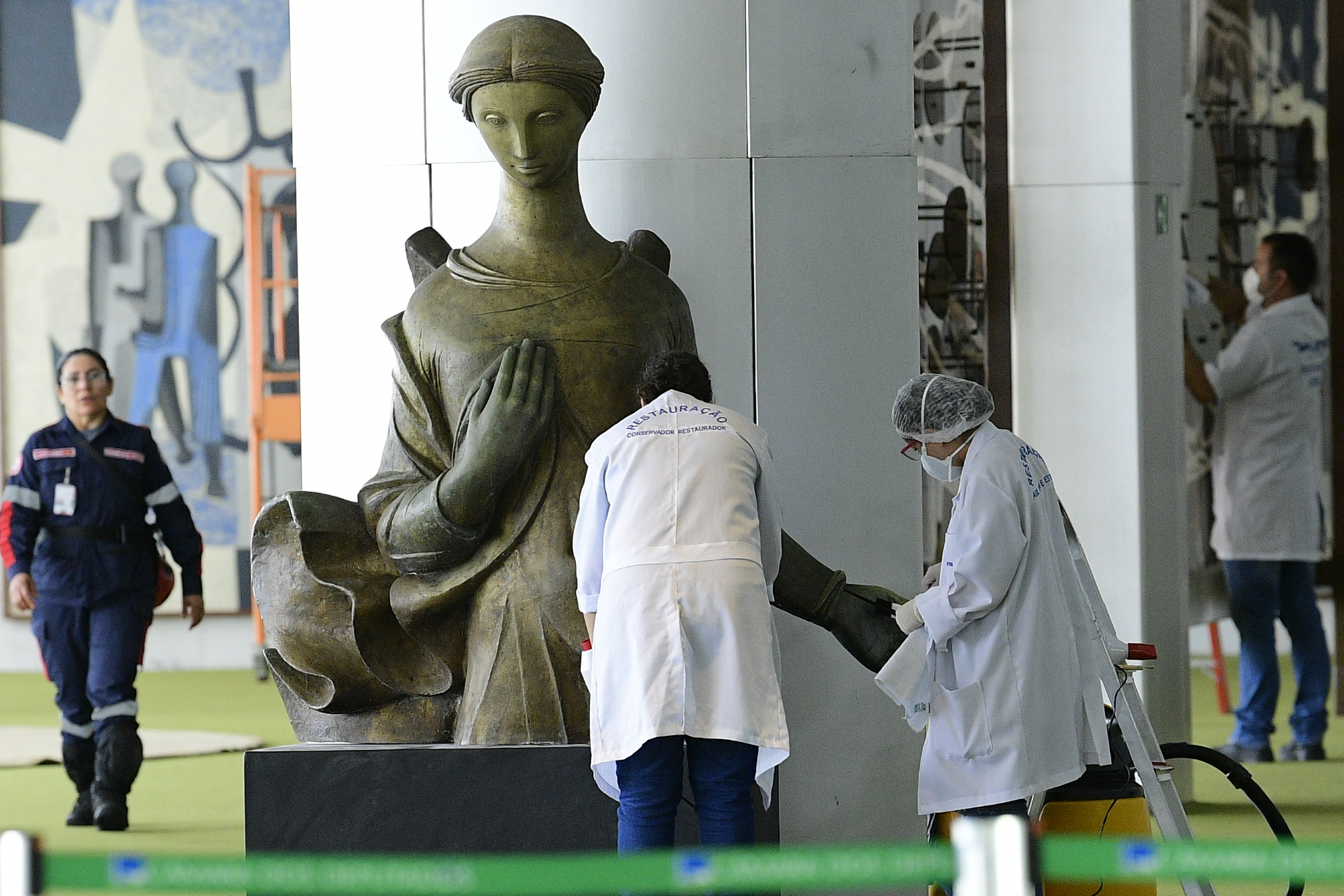
A team of technicians begins the restoration work on the Angel sculpture by Alfredo Ceschiatti. In the background, the Araguaia panel, by Marianne Peretti, is also undergoing repairs

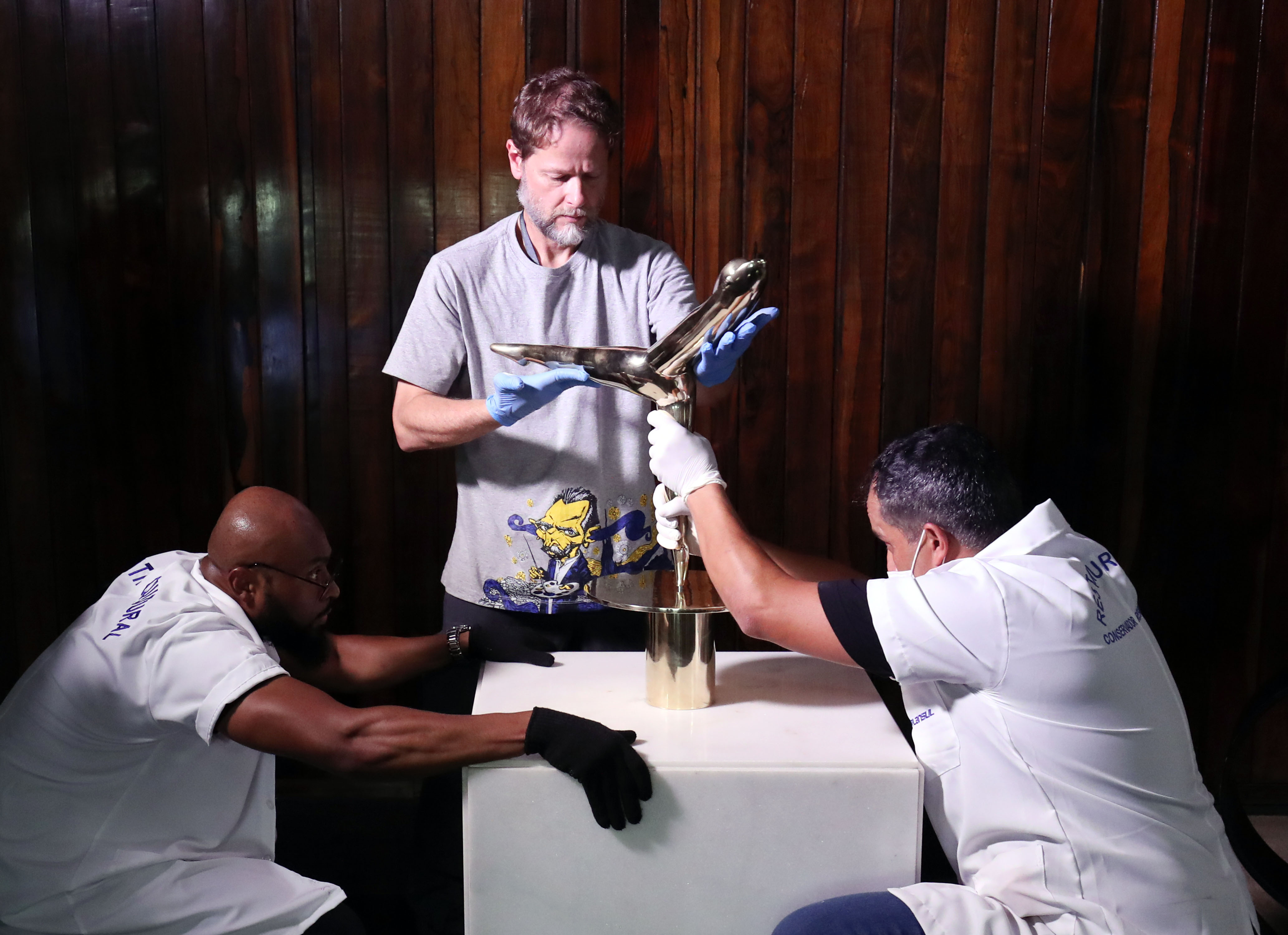
Re-installation of A Ballerina after restoration

== See also ==
- 2023 in Brazil
- Art destruction
- January 6 United States Capitol attack § Damage
- Looting
