= Operation Lesa Pátria =

Federal Police of Brazil investigation

- Operation name: Operation Lesa Pátria
- Scope: Domestic

Roster
- Executed by: Federal Police of Brazil

Mission
- Target: financiers, participants, and organizers of coup d'état attempts in Brazil

Timeline
- Date begin: 2023

Results
- Indictments: 919

Operation Lesa Pátria (Portuguese idiomatic expression associated to "crimes against the State") is a set of ongoing investigations led by the Federal Police of Brazil investigating financiers, participants, and organizers of coup d'état attempts in Brazil, particularly related to the attacks on the headquarters of the Three Powers on 8 January 2023, in Brasilia. The task force is considered permanent by the Federal Police, with "periodic updates on the number of warrants issued, people captured and fugitives". Operation Lesa Pátria is the largest police operation launched in Brazil since Operation Lava Jato (2014-2021).

== Investigations ==
On 9 January 2023, the day after the attacks, the Federal Police arrested 2,151 people in flagrante delicto who allegedly participated in the actions and were camped in front of barracks in Brasília. Of these, 745 (a little more than a third of those caught in the act) were released after they provided identification, among them people over 70, people between 60 and 70 years old with comorbidities, and 50 women who were with children under 12 years old at the time.

Initially, the investigations were facilitated by the suspects posting evidence of their crimes on social networks. In addition, volunteers created profiles and accounts to assist authorities with the identification of participants in the 8 January acts. Brazil's Federal Police also released an electronic e-mail for providing information.

The arrests were carried out mainly in establishments of the Federal District Penitentiary System: the 19th Military Police Battalion (BPM), known as "Papudinha"; the Papuda Penitentiary Complex, composed of four men's prisons; and the Federal District Women's Penitentiary, known as "Colmeia". According to the Federal Police, those investigated were to answer for several types of criminal charges, among them: violent abolition of the democratic rule of law, coup d'état, aggravated damage, criminal association, incitement to crime, destruction, and deterioration or destruction of specially protected property.

As of 13 March 2023, the Attorney General's Office (PGR) had indicted 919 people for public incitement to crime and criminal association. Of these, 219 were also charged with more serious crimes (aggravated damage, violent abolition of the rule of law, and coup d'état). A total of 310 men and 82 women remained in prison, for a total of 392 people.

== Notable targets ==
=== Ibaneis Rocha and Anderson Torres ===
In the 1st phase of Lesa Pátria (20 January 2023), the Federal Police of Brazil conducted an operation against Ibaneis Rocha (MDB-DF), former governor of the Federal District (DF), removed since 9 January by Alexandre de Moraes, minister of the Supreme Court (STF). Search warrants were served at the office and home of Rocha, and his cabinet in the Buriti Palace (headquarters of the Government of the DF). The action, requested by the Attorney General's Office (PGR) and authorized by the STF, was aimed at investigating alleged "omissive commissive" acts on 8 January.

A week earlier, Anderson Torres, former Secretary of Public Safety in Ibaneis Rocha's administration, had been arrested in Brasilia shortly after returning from Florida. The request for his arrest had been granted by Minister Alexandre de Moraes at the request of the Director General of the Federal Police. During the search and seizure warrants at Torres' house, the Federal Police found a coup draft that foresaw the establishment of a state of defense at the headquarters of the Superior Electoral Court (TSE) in order to annul the 2022 presidential elections. This document, interpreted as evidence of an attempted coup d'état, has been added to lawsuits investigating coup acts in Brazil.

=== Representatives and political leaders ===
- José Ruy Garcia, councilman from Inhumas (GO);
- Antonio Clesio Ferreira, defeated candidate for mayor of Ouro Preto (MG);

=== Police and military officials ===
- Colonel Jorge Eduardo Naime Barreto, former head of the operational department of the military police of the Federal District (PMDF);
- Captain Josiel Pereira César, deputy commanding general of the PMDF;
- Major Flávio Silvestre de Alencar, investigated for facilitating extremists' access to the Supreme Court building;
- Lieutenant Rafael Pereira Martins;
- Major Cláudio Mendes dos Santos, accused of managing the money used to finance the attacks and teaching military tactics to the people camped in front of the Brazilian Army barracks in Brasília;
- Major Flávio Silveira, responsible for the command of the military police battalion that used to secure the Esplanade;

=== Bolsonarist influencers ===
- Ramiro Alves da Rocha Cruz Júnior, known as "Ramiro dos Caminhoneiros";
- Luciano Oliveira dos Santos, known as "Popó Bolsonaro";
- Leonardo Rodrigues de Jesus ("Léo Índio"), nephew of former president Jair Bolsonaro;

=== People who became famous after their crimes ===
- Antônio Cláudio Alves Ferreira, caught destroying Balthazar Martinot's clock during the invasion of the Planalto Palace;
- Maria de Fátima Mendonça Souza, known as "Dona Fátima de Tubarão";

== Phases (2023-ongoing) ==
As of 23 May 2023, Operation Lesa Pátria had reached 12 phases, 178 search and seizure warrants, and 88 arrests (preventive and temporary).

Phases	Dates	Federative units of Brazil	Warrants	
Phases	Dates	Federative units of Brazil	Search and seizure	Arrests
1st phase	20 January	ES, MG, PR, RJ, SC and DF	16	8
2nd phase	23 January	MG	0	1
3rd phase	27 January	ES, MG, PR, RJ, SC and DF	27	11
4th phase	3 February	ES, GO, MT, RO SP and DF	14	3
5th phase	7 February	DF	6	4
6th phase	14 February	GO, MG, PR, SE and SP	13	8
7th phase	7 March	MG and PR	8	3
8th phase	17 March	BA, ES, GO, MA, MG, PR, RO, RS, SP and DF	46	32
9th phase	23 March	DF	0	1
10th phase	18 April	GO, MG, MT, PA, PR, RJ, SP and DF	22	16
11th phase	11 May	SP, MT and PR	22	0
12th phase	23 May	DF	4	1
Total			178	88

== See also ==
- 2022–2023 Brazilian election protests
- 2023 Brazilian Congress attack
- Bolsonarism
- Terrorism in Brazil
