= 8 January Brasília attacks =

2023 government storming in Brazil

- Part of the 2022–2023 Brazilian election protests and the 2022 Brazilian coup plot
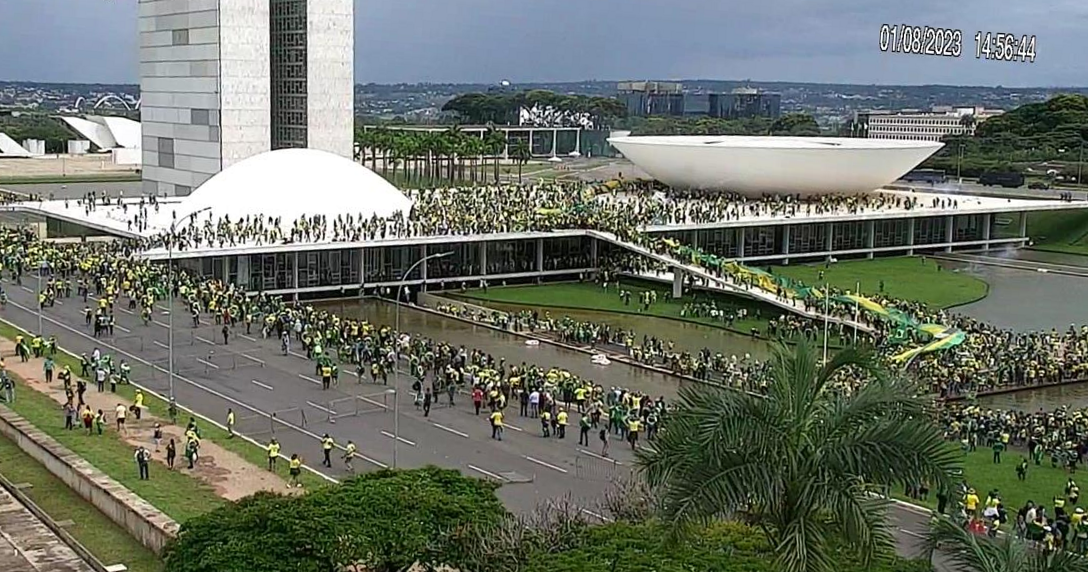
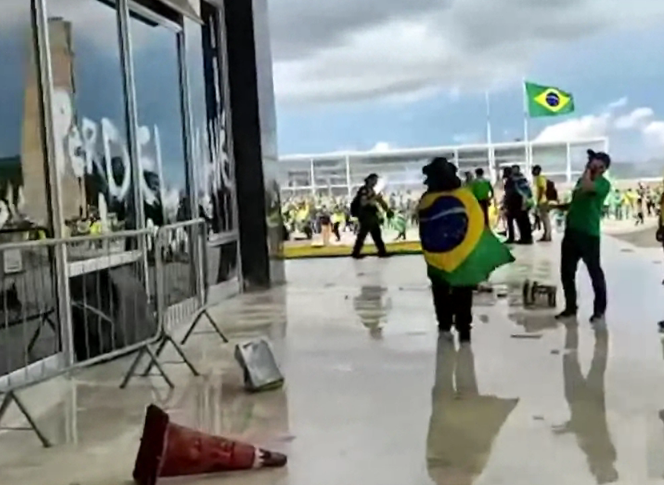
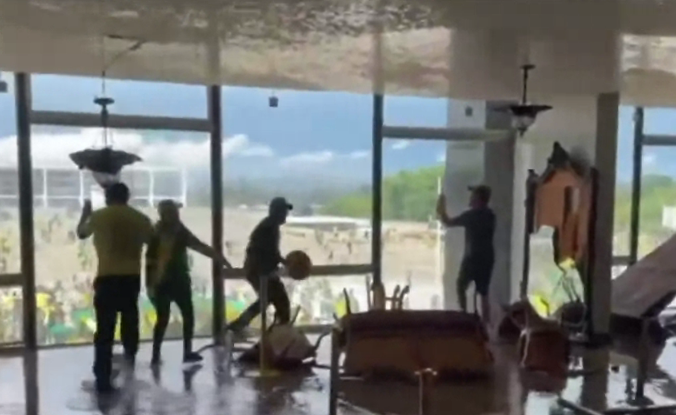
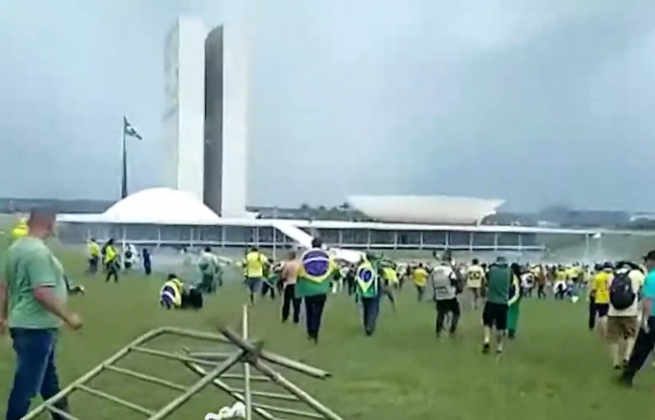
- From top to bottom, left to right: Crowd outside of the National Congress Palace during the attack; Protesters outside of the Supreme Federal Court Palace; Rioters destroying furniture inside the Palácio do Planalto; Police barriers broken through by rioters near the National Congress building
- Date: 8 January 2023; 3 years ago
- Location: Praça dos Três Poderes, Brasília, Federal District, Brazil; 15°48′03″S 47°51′41″W
- Caused by: False allegations of electoral fraud in the 2022 Brazilian general election promoted by former President Jair Bolsonaro and his allies; Denial of the 2022 presidential election results; Far-right extremism in Brazil
- Goals: Pressure military and government officials to instigate a coup d'état against President Luiz Inácio Lula da Silva's government; Reinstate Jair Bolsonaro as President of Brazil
- Methods: Protest: picketing, political demonstration; Civil disorder: assault, rioting, looting, vandalism, attempted arson; Political subversion: propaganda (big lie), conspiracy, sedition, intimidation, attacking a legislature
- Result: Coup attempt failed: Riot suppressed; all targeted buildings cleared; Detainment en masse of rioters by law enforcement; Dozens of security officials assaulted, at least 44 hospitalized; Several protesters injured, 40+ hospitalized; Extensive damage to the targeted buildings and surrounding area, at least R$16 million for repairs and security measures; Several art pieces stolen or damaged; Declaration of federal intervention on the Federal District for the remainder of January; Supreme Federal Court order suspends Ibaneis Rocha as governor of the Federal District for 90 days; Installation of the 8 January CPMI in the National Congress; Jair Bolsonaro and his running mate Walter Braga Netto are declared ineligible following an Electoral Court ruling on June 30; Bolsonaro and his close allies are sentenced by the Supreme Court on 11 September 2025 for their role in a coup plot against then president-elect Luiz Inácio Lula da Silva

Parties
Pro-Bolsonaro protesters: Armed protesters; Police and military personnel (both active and reservists); Former Jair Bolsonaro government members and politicians; Various far-right groups and movements	Federal and state government forces; Congress, Supreme Court and Senate security; Federal and Federal Highway police; Tactical Operations and Aviation commands; Military Police; Riot control unit; Special Operations Battalion; Civil Police; Special Operations Division; Institutional Security Bureau; National Public Security Force; Brazilian Armed Forces; Brazilian Army

Lead figures
No known organised leadership	Lula da Silva; Flávio Dino; Gonçalves Dias; Ibaneis Rocha

Number
5,000+	Unknown

Casualties
- Injuries: 80+ (~40 rioters and at least 44 security agents), 6 in serious condition (including 2 in need of surgery)
- Arrested: 1,430+ (according to the Supreme Court)
- Damage: at least $16 million BRL
- Detained: 2,100+ (at least 1,920 between 8–9 January)
- Charged: 86 (23 criminally charged, 65 awaiting judgement)

On 8 January 2023, following the defeat of president Jair Bolsonaro in the 2022 Brazilian general election and the inauguration of his successor Luiz Inácio Lula da Silva, a mob of Bolsonaro's supporters attacked Brazil's federal government buildings in the capital, Brasília. The mob invaded and caused deliberate damage to the Supreme Federal Court, the National Congress Palace and the Planalto Presidential Palace in the Praça dos Três Poderes (English: Three Powers Square or Three Branches of Government), seeking to violently overthrow the democratically elected president Lula, who had been inaugurated on 1 January. Many rioters said their purpose was to spur military leaders to launch a "military intervention" (related to a misinterpretation of the 142nd article of the Brazilian constitution and a euphemism for a coup d'état) and disrupt the democratic transition of power. The event is sometimes called the Bolsonarist uprising.

At the time of the riots, neither Lula nor Bolsonaro were in Brasília: Lula was in Araraquara, a city in the countryside of São Paulo, with mayor Edinho Silva and ministers Luiz Marinho, Jader Barbalho Filho and Waldez Góes, surveying the city after heavy rains in the municipality; Bolsonaro was in Orlando, Florida, where he had been since the last days of 2022, even before the end of his term.

The attack occurred a week after Lula's inauguration and followed several weeks of unrest from Bolsonaro's supporters. It took more than five hours for the Brazilian security forces to clear all three buildings of the rioters, which happened at 21:00 BRT (UTC−03:00). The storming of the government buildings drew swift condemnation from governments around the world.

In response to the attack, at 18:00 BRT, Lula announced that he had signed a decree authorising a federal state of emergency in the Federal District through the end of January 2023. Congress was not in session at the time of the attacks, but it swiftly ratified the declaration by 10 January.

== Background ==
During Bolsonaro's tenure as president of Brazil, his allies and supporters floated the idea of an assault like the United States Capitol attack of 6 January 2021 in the event he lost his re-election bid. Bolsonaro supporters alleged that the 2022 Brazilian general election suffered from widespread electoral fraud that caused Bolsonaro's loss. They claimed electronic voting machine malfunctions and deemed some voting patterns suspicious, and mistrusted election officials. The military helped oversee the election and found no signs of fraud. Supporters of Bolsonaro used social media to spread misinformation about supposed electoral fraud, further motivating the protesters. Supporters of Bolsonaro were also inspired by other international events in 2022 that bolstered the far-right such as the Canada convoy protests, the elections of Bongbong Marcos in the Philippines, and Giorgia Meloni in Italy.

Some military reservists voiced support for a truckers' strike before the second round of elections, including Colonel Marcos Koury, who, on 16 October 2022, published a video encouraging a truckers' general strike before the second round. Koury's video about the shutdowns was shared in several Pro-Bolsonaro groups on WhatsApp, Telegram, Facebook, and other social media websites, and, days later, members of these same groups started defending roadblocks after the elections. Calls for strikes were also made on YouTube, TikTok, Twitter, and Instagram.

Trucker protests lost strength on 3 November 2022, and Bolsonaro supporters began to gather in the vicinity of Brazilian Armed Forces facilities. Demonstrations took place at military installations in the cities of São Paulo, Rio de Janeiro, Brasília, Florianópolis, Recife, Salvador, and other cities and regions. In Brasília, a group had camped in front of the Army Headquarters, demanding that the Armed Forces carry out a military coup; in January, Lula's government attempted to remove these protesters and, when this failed, ordered reinforced security. That week, the minister of justice also reiterated that the camps would be dismantled.

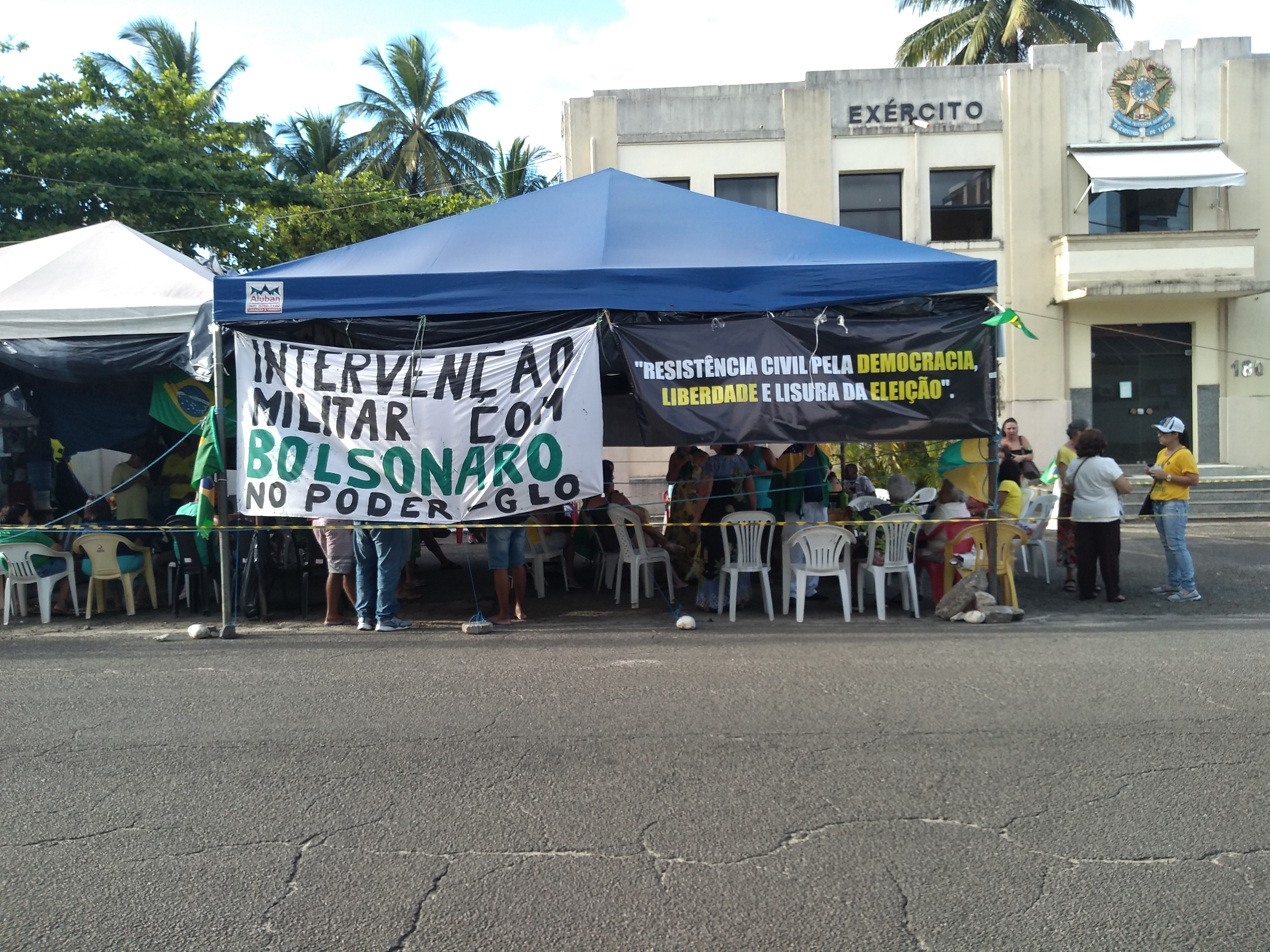
Protest camp in front of the Brazilian Army's barracks in Ilhéus, Bahia

The electoral victory of Luiz Inácio Lula da Silva (Lula) was officially ratified by the Superior Electoral Court on 12 December 2022. Militant far-right Bolsonaro supporters stormed the Federal Police headquarters in Brasília and torched vehicles on the street after one of the protesters was arrested for inciting violence to prevent Lula's swearing-in. The police used stun grenades and tear gas to disperse them. A bombing attempt near Brasília International Airport was prevented by the police on 23 December; the suspect was arrested a day later. According to his testimony, he was motivated by Bolsonaro casting doubts on the integrity of the election process in the past. Other attempted attacks were carried out by Bolsonaro supporters after the election and during the beginning of Lula's government, including the case of a man who was arrested while attempting to enter the ministries' esplanade carrying a knife and an explosive device during Lula's inauguration.

=== Planning, inciting and financing ===
On 2 January 2023, former Bolsonaro minister Anderson Torres was appointed chief security officer of the Federal District by the reelected governor Ibaneis Rocha. The next day, Torres changed the command of the intelligence and special operations team of the department, including the undersecretary of the first Intelligence, George Estefani, and Chief of the Federal Police Milton Rodrigues. Those who were dismissed had been monitoring the protests and had understanding of terrorism and experience in crisis management. Torres then left Brazil on the night of 6 January for Orlando, Florida, arriving 7 January, just hours before the attacks and one week after Bolsonaro's own arrival in Orlando. Reports of a planned attack were already circulating in the first week of 2023, with audios leaked from several WhatsApp and Telegram groups showing intent by pro-Bolsonaro groups to organise a "massive protest" in Brasília, provoke violent actions by the crowd, circumvent police action, and possibly incite a military coup d'etat. Several groups and communities from throughout the country arranged for transport by bus to Brasília to participate in the demonstrations. Many social media websites (such as Twitter, Instagram, Facebook, and TikTok) did not moderate misleading claims about the election, meaning that people who used these sites to find information about the election were presented with these misleading claims. Before the attack, plans for protests in Brasília were referred to as "Selma's Party", a code phrase used on social media to discuss plans without arousing suspicion. Variants on the phrase were used to discuss planned riots in other cities.

Members of the federal cabinet were aware of the rioters' plans, but were assured by Rocha and Torres that the situation was under control. The district government on 6 January planned to prevent the rioters from reaching the National Congress, and had also closed access to its esplanade. However, Rocha changed the agreed-upon plans shortly before the protest and opened the esplanade to protesters. As a result, the security contingent was easily overwhelmed. The plan had called for the deployment of more than 1,300 officers from the Civil and Military Police, as well as about 200 officers of the National Public Security Force, but the actual number was far lower, which Rocha blamed on the public security secretary of Brasília, Anderson Torres. Justice Minister Flávio Dino later said that Anderson Torres had rejected the deployment of the National Public Security Force and did not accept the plan that called for deployment of reinforcements before the protest. O Estado de S. Paulo reported that the Planalto Military Command rejected the need for reinforcements at the presidential palace.

Anonymous government officials told The Washington Post that the buses that transported Bolsonaro supporters to Brasília had been paid for by donors from ten states, including some involved in agribusiness. Minister of Justice Flávio Dino stated that up to that point it had not been possible to "clearly distinguish" those responsible for financing the buses. He added: "What you can definitely say is that there was funding." Dino later reiterated that the donors were from the agribusiness sector and engaged in illegal activities.

According to the police, the rioters were prepared and appeared to know the location of key infrastructure such as fire hydrants, according to Alan Diego dos Santos Rodrigues, who was arrested for the attempted bombing at the Brasília International Airport. Many members of the military, both reserve and on-duty, took part in identifying and mapping the buildings, especially the Congress building. The group had allegedly been in Brasília since December, when they were at the protest camp in front of Army Headquarters. The group, called "the red berets", had been identified by the Brazilian Intelligence Agency as a "highly extremist, violent and anti democratic" group with the capability, ways and motivation to "gravely compromise the democratic state of law" and "plan, execute and incite violent attacks against authorities", including then president-elect Lula; most of the highly decentralised group were members of military paratrooper divisions and, while they shared similar beliefs, had no known leadership. The group was described as acting like mercenaries, paid for "services" such as making and delivering explosive devices to the airport in Brasília and mapping the installations of the National Congress and Supreme Federal Court buildings, as well as energy infrastructure in Brasília, possibly with the intention of carrying out terrorist attacks or assassinations against Lula and minister Alexandre de Moraes.

Other people involved in planning and executing the attack, such as Symon Albino (known as "Patriot Symon"), Diego Dias Ventura and Ana Priscila Azevedo, are suspected of inciting the attacks and paying for the buses that took protesters to Brasília. Albino and Azevedo made videos and posted on Telegram channels before the attack, asking members to prepare and "not let communism take power", "collapse the system" and "take power by force". In addition, they were allegedly close to the "red berets" and met with them before the attack. Azevedo was the target of an operation by the Federal Police ordered by Alexandre de Moraes, and is preemptively under arrest after she shared videos of herself during the attack on the National Congress and the Federal Supreme Court (Portuguese: Supremo Tribunal Federal, STF), and Albino was arrested by the Federal Police in a similar operation. Army reservist Marcelo Soares Correa (known as Cabo Correa), appointed as the leader of the "red berets" group and linked to many of the group's activities, has not been found. He was a candidate for federal deputy for the Brazilian Woman's Party (PMB) in 2022, and had been detained in 2016 for invading the National Congress during a protest asking for military intervention. He also allegedly took part in the march from army headquarters to the Praça dos Três Poderes, and was reportedly heard saying that "pacifism has ended", which meant, according to police, that he intended to invade the federal buildings.

== Events ==
External videos
- News reports covering the timeline of the attack
- via YouTube
- Brazil: how exactly the storming of government buildings unfolded (9 January 2023), by The Guardian
- 24 hours of terror: summary of the insurrectionist attack in Brasília (9 January 2023), by Metrópoles (in Portuguese)
- BBC Documentary | 8 January: The day that shook Brazil (5 July 2023), by BBC News (in Portuguese)

=== Protesters' arrival in Brasília and security preparations ===
On the morning of 7 January, more than 100 buses (as well as an unknown number of private vehicles) arrived in Brasília from all parts of Brazil, bringing in radical Bolsonaro supporters to join the ~500 protesters camped in front of Army Headquarters and raising the total number of people there to over 4,000. Early on 8 January, Defence Minister José Múcio visited the camp, reportedly saying that the situation was "calm, for now." Federal District governor Ibaneis Rocha sent a message to Justice Minister Flávio Dino, also claiming that there was no immediate threat to the security of the federal buildings; However, by 12:00, the Institutional Security Bureau had requested reinforcements of around 35 men at the Presidential Palace, and the police forces of the Congress and Supreme Court were placed on alert against a possible attack by the protesters against the buildings.

=== March to the Plaza and initial confrontations ===
At 11:30, military police met with the protesters to discuss the march. The organisers allegedly agreed to the police's demands not to cross into the plaza itself, although police already feared possible escalation and violence. By around 13:00 BRT, the demonstrators began marching from the Army Headquarters towards Three Powers Plaza. As the protesters marched, military police escorted them, with one of the officers saying that they would "guarantee the security of the marchers", as well as attempt to prevent violence or confrontations. Some people were detained in front of the Ministry of Defence building and the National Stadium for reported vandalism; police later reported that a few of the detained were armed, also raising concerns about possible violent attacks by protesters against both police and the government buildings.

Some cases of violence were reported later by the end of the march: one car was vandalized and its driver attacked by demonstrators with sticks and stones after he allegedly "shouted profanities and made fun" of the marchers; police intervened in the situation and reportedly detained some of the people involved. Witnesses to the march later said that some protesters threatened to invade and vandalise government buildings such as those of the Congress, of the Supreme Federal Court (STF), and of the Superior Electoral Court (TSE), citing cases of protesters shouting threats against government officials, politicians, police and public buildings. One of the demonstrators detained by police in the march later confirmed that some among the mob indeed had previous intent to confront police and attack the Congress building, as well as possibly other buildings (such as the previously mentioned Supreme Court, Electoral Court and Presidential Palace).

By the early afternoon, some demonstrators had reached the Three Powers Plaza, where around 100 people were concentrated. At around 14:00 BRT (UTC−03:00), a mob of protesters, some wearing masks and/or protective gear, as well as armed with sticks, stones, slingshots and sharp objects, broke through a ~30 men strong Military Police and Special Operations Battalion (BOPE) barrier near the Cathedral of Brasília, with physical confrontation breaking out between the protesters and policemen, who, while outnumbered, used pepper spray, batons and tasers in an unsuccessful attempt to disperse the initial riot. Another barrier around 200 meters from the Congress building was also broken through by ~14:40, with police beginning to deploy tear gas and stun grenades against the rioters (as per standard Brazilian riot control protocols); Officers inside of the Congress building later requested reinforcements, as protesters began to attack and vandalize the windows and exterior of the building by 15:00. Despite this, some members of the military police were seen being lenient with the attackers, with some being caught on camera smiling, taking photos of/with the protesters or even guiding the rioters instead of detaining them.

=== Attack on the Congress building ===
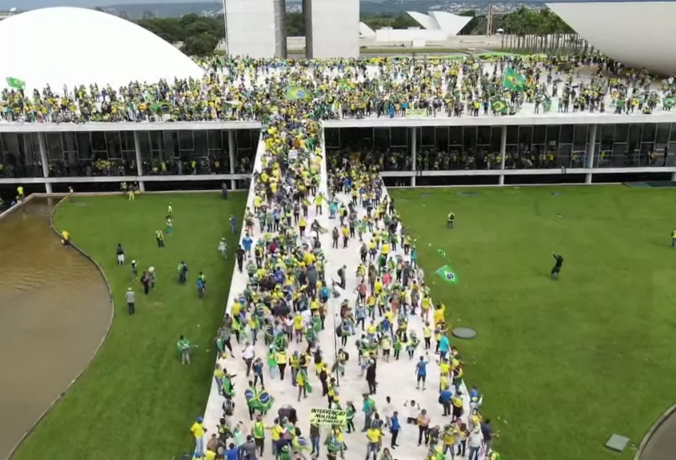
Protesters invade the National Congress of Brazil.

At around 15:10 BRT, the mob split into different groups. The first entered the National Congress building, and again clashed with police. Some time later, senator Veneziano do Rêgo confirmed to CNN Brazil that rioters had managed to enter the Congress building; according to him, they reached the upper floor, where the domes of the Federal Senate and the Chamber of Deputies are located, as well as the Green Hall of the Chamber of Deputies.

A group of protesters attempted to hang a green and yellow banner from the building during the invasion, but were prevented from doing so as the confrontations (as well as the police's response) grew increasingly violent, many rioters also allegedly left the protest or went inside the buildings to "avoid being hit by rubber bullets or tear gas launched by Police". This claim, however, is disputed, as many people who claimed to not have "taken part in any type of rioting, violence or vandalism" during testimonies or trials were later proven to having been indeed actively taking part in the attack.

Inside the Congress building, protesters clashed with the Legislative and Federal Senate Police; videos show the heavily outnumbered police officers engaging in physical combat with rioters, attempting to stop them from overtaking and vandalizing the building, although the barrier was later broken, as the rioters managed to take over and ransack most of the upper floor of the Congress building. Around 16:00, protesters broke through the glass in the Green Room of the Congress building and clashed with about 60 Legislative Police officers in the Deputies' Chamber and Senate, throwing rocks, small steel/tin spheres and water jets (as well as tear gas and stun grenades launched by police) at the police barricade, which responded by attacking the invaders with batons and pepper spray. Rioters also attempted to access the plenary of the Senate, but were temporarily fended off by police.

=== Attack on the Supreme Court and Presidential Palace ===
Footage captured by security guards of the Supreme Federal Court

Part of the mob later climbed the ramp of the Congress building by 15:15 and reached the Supreme Federal Court building and the Palácio do Planalto (Presidential Palace), where rioters attacked police and vandalised the exterior of the buildings. Between 15:30 and 16:00, after several confrontations, the protesters nearly managed to take over both buildings, with more vandalism and violence reported. In the Supreme Federal Court building, police arrested eight rioters who attempted to enter the offices inside the building. Protesters also extended a Brazilian flag in the windows of the building in an attempt to protect against the rubber bullets, water cannons, and stun grenades used by police. Inside the presidential palace, the mob clashed yet again with police, with many vandalizing and looting several areas of the building during the fighting. Some rooms were severely damaged, and a small group of invaders was able to get into restricted areas of the building, with some attempting to enter President Lula's office, although they were barred by security. Despite this, video later released by CNN Brazil shows members of the Institutional Security Bureau apparently being lenient with the invaders. Some were seen guiding them out of the building, and one official even distributed water to the rioters. Among those accused of leniency was then-secretary Marco Edson Gonçalves Dias, who can be seen in videos calmly talking with protesters and guiding them out of the area. No arrests were made by the bureau's security forces. Dias later resigned.

Rioters inside the Supreme Federal Court building

By 16:25 BRT, soldiers from the National Public Security Force reached the Ministries' Esplanade and began supporting the police forces there, with Ibaneis Rocha telling STF Minister Rosa Weber that he had "sent all security forces available to the region". A National Public Security Force vehicle was vandalised and, either by protesters or by the driver, pushed into the reflecting pool of the monument during the confrontations, with a man later attempting, unsuccessfully, to set fire to the vehicle. Troops from the Brazilian Army's presidential battalion also responded, with several soldiers and two helicopters being later dispatched from headquarters in an attempt to disperse the crowd. Also at 16:25 BRT, Augusto Aras, the Prosecutor-General of Brazil, asked the Prosecutor-General of the Federal District to open a criminal investigation.

Protesters vandalizing the Supreme Federal Court

By 16:40, the military police's riot and cavalry units had arrived at the plaza and begun dispersing rioters with batons, pepper spray, and stun grenades. Ibaneis Rocha later asked the secretary-executive of public security of Brasília, Fernando Sousa to retake control over the Congress building and "arrest as many as possible". At around the same time, small reinforcements sent by the Federal Police's Tactical and Aerial operations commands (such as helicopters and armored vehicles), as well as some officers and vehicles from the Civil Police of the Federal District (including its Special Operations unit) arrived to monitor the situation and support the military police in retaking the buildings (including with the use of rubber bullets and stun/tear gas bombs fired by anti-riot units). By around 17:00 BRT, security forces had regained control of the Congress building, and almost managed to retake the Supreme Court, though some rioters remained encamped in its parking garage.

At 17:08 BRT, the governor of the Federal District, Ibaneis Rocha, made assurances that he was "taking all measures to contain the anti-democratic riot in the Ministries' Esplanade"; in addition, he dismissed the secretary of security of the Federal District, Anderson Torres, who was still in Florida, replacing him with executive secretary Fernando Sousa. At 17:50 BRT, Lula announced that he had signed a decree authorising a federal public security intervention in Brasília, to continue until 31 January. Lula also blamed Bolsonaro for the attack during an interview. By 18:00, the Supreme Federal Court was declared clear of rioters, with many arrests still being made around the building.

Rioters attack the front of the Supreme Federal Court building.

Lula invoked Article 34, Subheading III of the Federal Constitution, which empowers the government to put an end to a serious impairment of public order. It was the third application of Article 34 of the 1988 Federal Constitution, which had previously been applied in Rio de Janeiro and Roraima during the Temer administration. Ricardo Cappelli, executive secretary of the Ministry of Justice and Public Security, was appointed as intervenor. The intervention relieved Federal District governor, Ibaneis Rocha, of the authority to oversee security in the district, and lasted until 31 January.

=== Arrests and end of the riots ===
Aftermath of the riots inside the Supreme Court building

At 18:20 BRT, protesters reportedly attempted to set fire to the lawn in front of the National Congress. Later, the Military Police of the Federal District (PMDF) reported it had begun to clear rioters out of the buildings. At 18:30 BRT, The Attorney General of the Union reported that he had filed a request for Torres's arrest.

The Brazilian Army arrived in military trucks in the late afternoon and ambushed the intruders in the presidential palace through the back door, the rioters had left the building by 18:45 BRT, with some being escorted out by the police. By 19:00 BRT, over 150 people had been arrested by the security forces, at least 30 of them in flagrante delicto in the Federal Senate, with police reporting that many more arrests would be made. By 20:00, police announced that all three buildings had been cleared, although some protesters were still being detained in an attempt to escape from the plaza, with the total amount of those arrested put at over 240; Around the same time, Interventor Secretary of Justice of the Federal District Ricardo Capelli also called for further reinforcements to the police to assist in detaining the rioters. Justice Minister Flávio Dino announced the end of the riot by 21:00 BRT, reaffirming that all three buildings had been cleared.

== Aftermath ==
=== Damage and theft ===
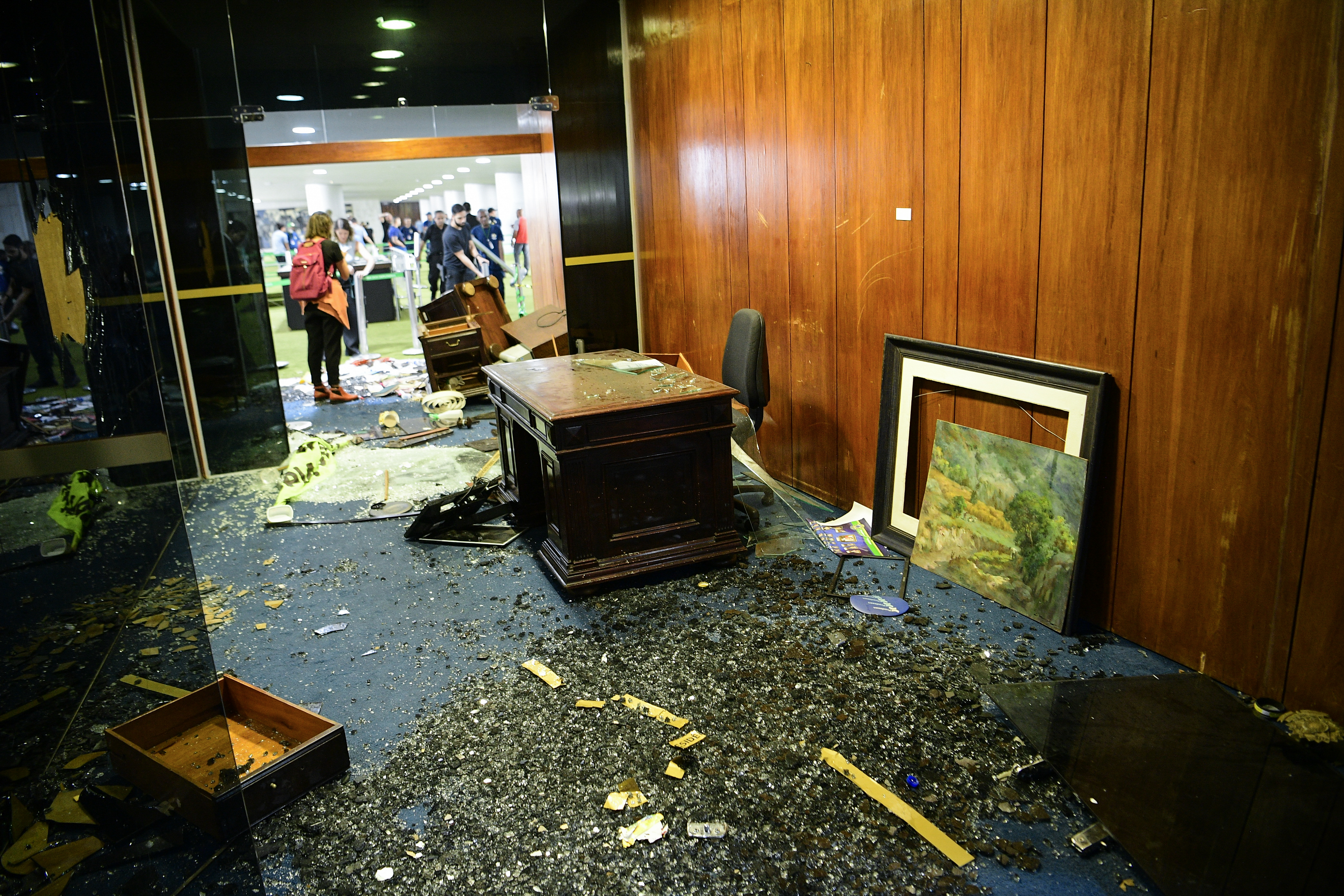
Painting and furniture damaged in the National Congress

A number of important spaces in the three stormed buildings were extensively vandalised and looted, including Noble Hall and the plenary chamber of the Federal Supreme Court, the Green, Blue, and Black Halls and the lobby of the Congress building, as well as the First Lady's office at the Planalto Palace. Many other spaces like corridors, windows, rooms and offices were also vandalised, and a large number of furniture, equipment and other objects were damaged. Several spaces were completely destroyed. The rioters destroyed fire hydrants to impede the fight against fires that broke out at various points of the invasion.

In addition to structural damage, several works of art, mainly paintings, vases, and historical objects such as chairs, clocks, carpets, and tables) were damaged, stolen or destroyed during the attack In the Planalto, the desk used by former president Juscelino Kubitschek was reportedly destroyed after it was used in a barricade, and As Mulatas, a painting by modernist Emiliano Di Cavalcanti, was stabbed repeatedly. "A Justiça", a statue by Alfredo Ceschiatti, was sprayed with graffiti, and "Araguaia", a stained glass window by Marianne Peretti, was damaged.

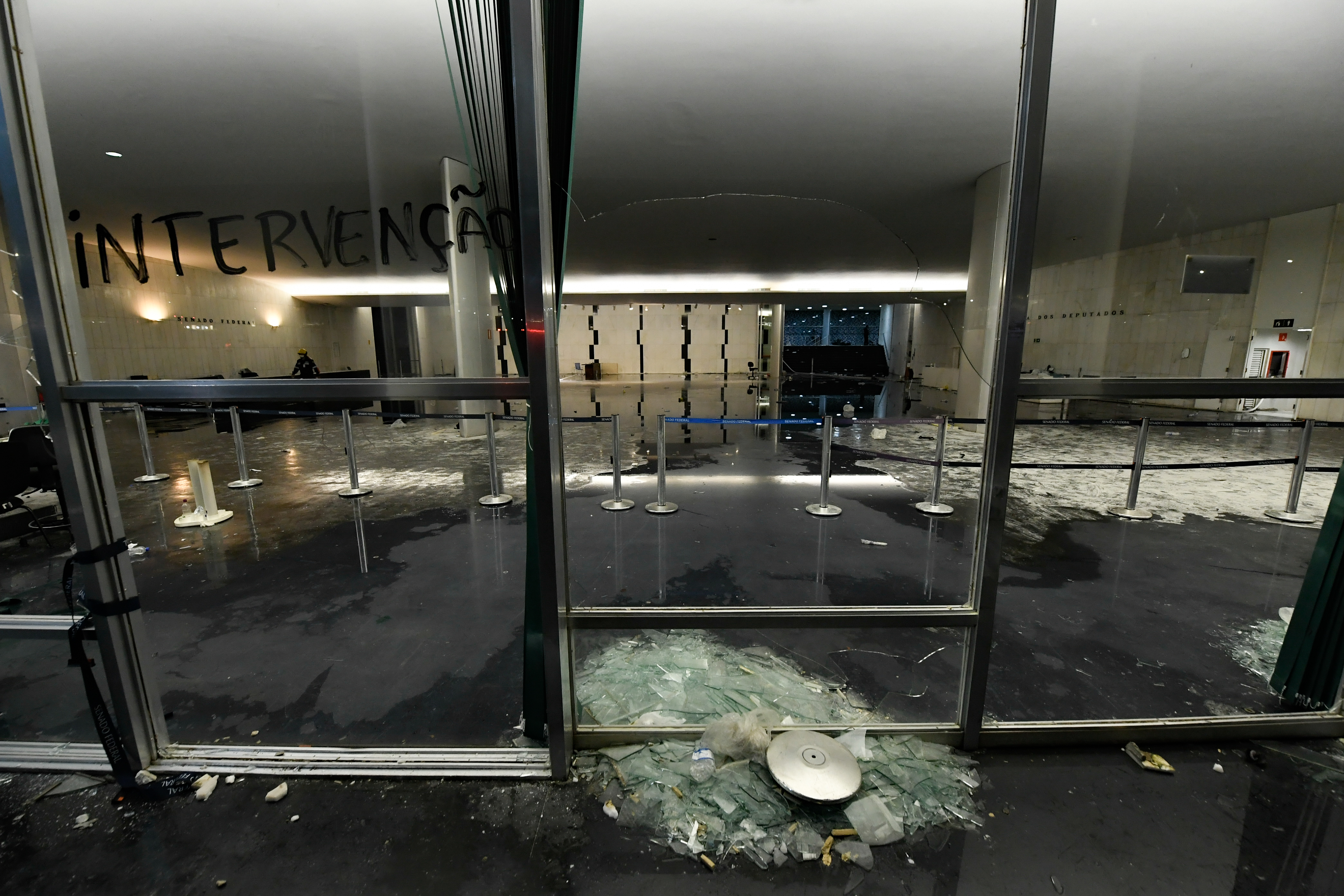
Entrance to the Chamber of Deputies after the attack

"A Bailarina", a sculpture by Victor Brecheret, was taken by a protester, but later found damaged on the ground. A rare clock made by Balthazar Martinot given by the French court to John VI of Portugal was thrown to the ground by a protester who was later arrested by police.

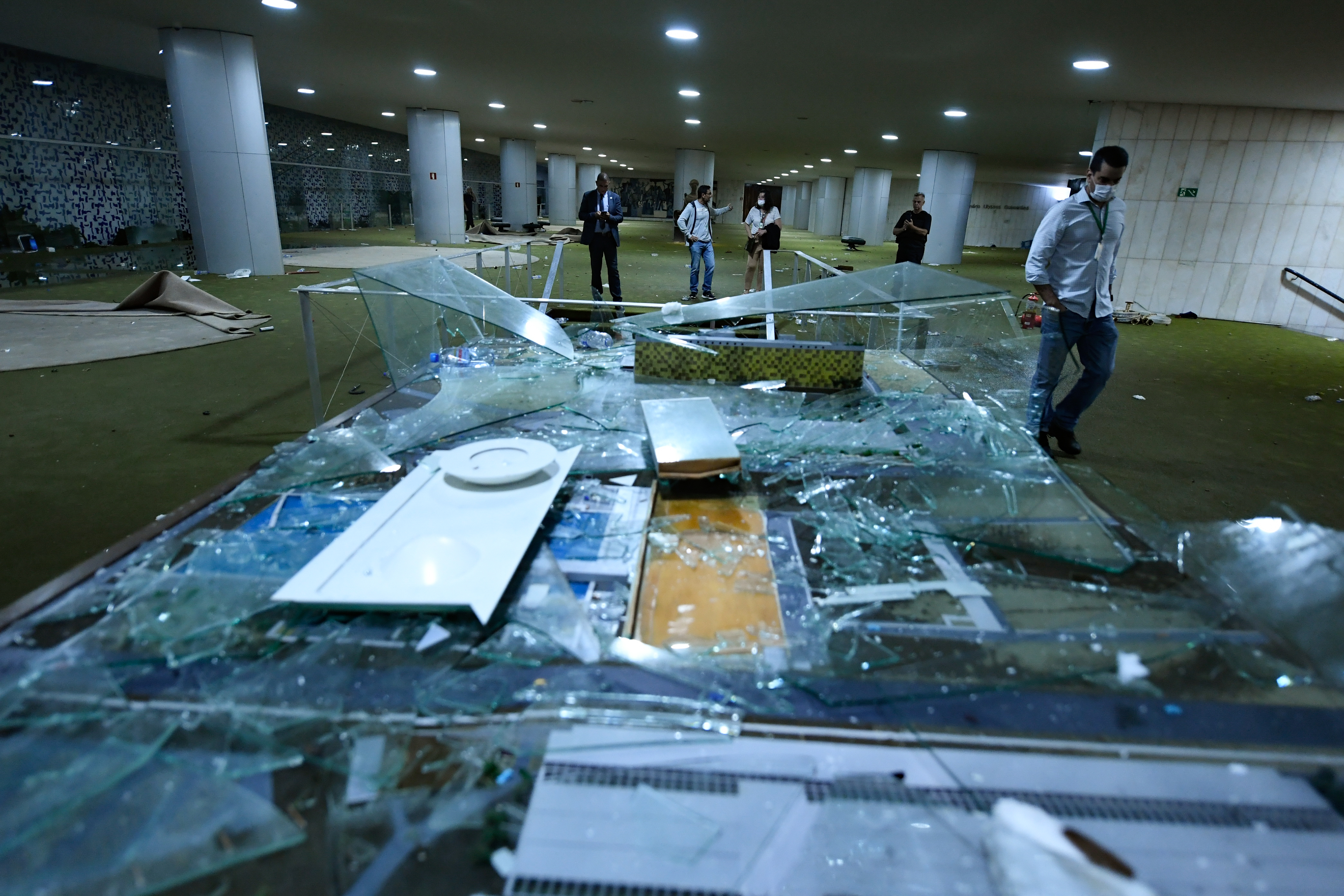
Showcase desk by designer Sérgio Rodrigues destroyed during the invasion

A soccer ball signed by Neymar was stolen by a protester, but later recovered by the Federal Police. A golden shell with a pearl, which was a gift from the Minister of Foreign Affairs and Deputy Prime Minister of Qatar, Mohammed bin Abdulrahman Al-Thani, was taken by rioters, while a decoration in the shape of an ostrich egg, a gift from Ahmed Ibrahim El-Tahir, the President of the Sudanese National Assembly, was destroyed; two vases, given by Lászlo Kövér, President of the National Assembly of the Republic of Hungary, and Wang Zhaoguo, Vice-chairman of the Standing Committee of the National People's Congress of the People's Republic of China, to Marco Maia, President of the Chamber of Deputies, were also destroyed during the attack. A bust of Ruy Barbosa, as well as a carpet that was owned by Princess Isabel (and several other carpets soaked by anti-fire systems) were also damaged. Furniture brought from the Monroe Palace was damaged, as well as an inkwell from the times of the Empire of Brazil, a Persian carpet, and the chair used by Rosa Weber, designed by Jorge Zalszupin.

Electronic devices – including laptops, phones, desktops, printers, photographic lenses and televisions – were also damaged or stolen by protesters; other items, such as an original of the 1988 constitution book and a Coat of arms of Brazil, were initially taken by the rioters, but later found among the rubble in the Supreme Federal Court building. The coat of arms was damaged, but the copy of the constitution was found intact. The offices of the Workers' Party and of the Brazilian Social Democracy Party in the Congress building were also invaded and vandalised by the mob. Inside the STF building, the ministers' chairs and a crucifix were taken or vandalised by the rioters, and the office of Alexandre de Moraes was ransacked; its door was sprayed with graffiti, and a closet's door was taken by a protester. Other offices were also vandalised, with some chairs and tables used in barricades. Rioters urinated and defecated in the press areas of the Congress building and Supreme Federal Court building, as well as in the Planalto Palace. Protesters also stole weapons, munitions and documents from the Office of Institutional Security in the Planalto. In an interview with CNN Brasil, Senator Randolfe Rodrigues said five grenades were found after the attack, three of them at the Supreme Court and two at the Congress complex.

==== Attacks on journalists and photographers ====
Several journalists were attacked during the protests. Folha de São Paulo photographer Pedro Ladeira was attacked and robbed by rioters. A journalist for Metrópoles was also attacked during the storming. Journalists and photographers from BandNews, O Tempo, AFP and Reuters were also attacked. Some were pushed to the ground and had their equipment stolen or damaged. At least ten journalists and photographers from different news outlets were attacked and/or robbed during the riot.

=== Power sabotage ===
On 9 January 2023 (one day after the Brasília attacks), three transmission towers in the states of Rondônia and Paraná (both of which are Bolsonaro's strongholds) were pulled down and cut off from Brazil's power grid. In the most serious incident, one tower connecting Brazil's Itaipu Dam to the country's grid was damaged by a tractor. According to the Brazilian National Electricity watchdog (ANEEL), no storm or natural disaster happened in those areas to sustain a natural cause for the towers collapse, which raised suspicions among government officials that some acts of sabotage by Bolsonaro supporters were underway to knock out power. An additional tower in the countryside of São Paulo state was damaged on 13 January. However, alternative towers were switched on and no effective power cut took place in all the incidents.

=== Arrests and legal action ===
During the attacks, Lula decreed federal intervention in the Federal District until 31 January 2023.

During the attack, Minister of Justice and Public Security, Flávio Dino, announced in a press conference that approximately 200 people had been arrested in flagrante delicto, and that new arrests were still being made. According to Dino, several buses to Brasília and their financiers had been identified. Federal District governor Ibaneis Rocha said in a publication on a social network that more than 400 people had been arrested. Some of those arrested before and during the attack were carrying knives, machetes, stilettos, scissors, pocket knives, small wooden stakes, slingshots with marbles and tin spheres, cloth soaked with vinegar (for use against tear gas and pepper spray), and even explosives such as grenades, materials for making Molotov cocktails, blowtorches and fireworks, among other weapons, with police reporting that some protestors could have been carrying firearms during the invasion; many also wore balaclavas, gas masks, gloves, ski masks, and protective equipment, possibly as an effort to hide their identities.

After the federal buildings were retaken, Justice of the Supreme Court (STF) judge Alexandre de Moraes suspended the governor of the Federal District, Ibaneis Rocha, for 90 days for shortcomings in security preparedness. He also ordered camps set up by protesters outside military bases cleared out within 24 hours, as well as all roads and buildings occupied by them, and removal of all anti-democratic posts by Bolsonaro supporters from Facebook, Twitter, and TikTok.

The police started clearing the protest camps near army bases throughout the country on 9 January. Soldiers backed by the police dismantled a camp outside the army headquarters in Brasília, which had been used as a base by those who had attacked the Three Powers Plaza and detained at least between 1,150 and 1,200 people there. An earlier attempt by federal government officials to arrest suspects involved in the attack at the camp on the night of 8 January was blocked by Brazilian Army commander Júlio Cesar de Arruda.

The total number of those detained by 9 January was at least 1,418, with ~222 detained in the Praça dos Três Poderes and around 1,196 in the camp in front of the Army Headquarters, according to the National Justice Council (CNJ); many of those arrested were taken to the Papuda Penitentiary Complex and the "Hive" women's penitentiary, of the total prisoners, 599 (mostly elderly, homeless people, people with physical or mental problems, and mothers accompanied by children) were later released on humanitarian grounds. Arrest warrants for around 50 people allegedly involved in the invasion were issued, according to Dino. As of March 2023, 2,182 people had been arrested for participation or connection to the attack. The federal government estimated that around 5,000 people had taken part.

The STF created a task force to hold hearings by federal judges and judges of the Federal District Court of Justice and sent it to Minister Alexandre de Moraes, who will decide on maintaining the prisons. Earlier, the Federal Public Defender's Office (DPU) defended the release of "hyper-vulnerable" people and the replacement of prison with precautionary measures, such as a ban on leaving their states of origin, frequenting barracks and military units, using social media, and maintaining contact with other demonstrators who are not related. Depending on the evidence, those involved may be charged with one or more crimes, including, but not limited to prevarication (for authorities and public security officials), insubordination (for authorities and servants in charge of public safety), crimes against democracy (such as attempted overthrow of a legitimately constituted government, also commonly known as a coup d'etat, and attempted violent abolition of the rule of law), terrorism (including preparation for terrorisma), criminal association, public incitement to commit a crime, persecution, intimidation, damage to private property, qualified damage such as damage to public property, historical and artistic heritage and protected buildings, or offenses to the bodily integrity or health of others. People who were not present but participated in orchestrating, financing, instigating, or collaborating in other ways would also be framed for the same crimes. If convicted of more than one crime, consecutive sentences could add up to 30 years in prison.

On 10 January, Moraes issued arrest warrants for the former public security secretary of Brasília Anderson Torres and the Federal District Military Police chief, Fabio Augusto Vieira. The Justice Ministry stated that the police had found a draft presidential decree authorising Bolsonaro to overturn the elections by implementing a "state of defense" on the Superior Electoral Court while searching the home of Torres. His lawyer claimed that the draft was a proposal by civilians and was never submitted to Bolsonaro, while Torres stated that it was taken out of context and was going to be eventually shredded. The National Congress meanwhile authorised Lula's decree for federal intervention in Brasília and deputy justice minister Ricardo Cappelli's appointment to oversee it.

President Lula announced a security review of officials posted at the presidential palace on 12 January. He said that he believed that doors had been deliberately left unlocked for the attack, and that no hardcore Bolsonaro supporter would be allowed to work in the building. Moraes on 13 January agreed to include Bolsonaro as part of the investigation into the riots because he had questioned the legitimacy of the elections on 10 January. Torres was arrested the following day after returning to Brasília.

The Prosecutor General of Brazil presented charges against the accused for the first time on 17 January, charging 39 people with armed criminal association, violent attempt to subvert the democratic state of law, staging a coup, and damage to public property. In an interview on 18 January, Lula blamed the intelligence services of the armed forces and the Brazilian Intelligence Agency for failing to alert him to the possibility of an attack. He dismissed Arruda from his post as commander of the army on 21 January, replacing him with Tomás Miguel Ribeiro Paiva. Lula also changed some Federal and Federal Highway police regional commands following the invasion after allegations of omission by these agencies.

On 19 April, Institutional Security Bureau commander Gonçalves Dias, as well as other members of the agency, resigned following the release of images showing alleged leniency by the members during the invasion of the Planalto Palace. He was replaced by Ricardo Cappelli, who became interim commander. Cappelli dismissed several members of the Bureau who were accused of leniency with the attackers. Marcos Antonio Amaro dos Santos was later appointed by Lula on 3 May as the commander of the GSI.

As of October 2023, Brazil's Public Prosecutor's Office had charged roughly 1,400 people with crimes such as vandalism against public property, participation in a criminal armed organization, or insurrection. And by 8 January 2024, the "anniversary" of the attack, over 2,000 people had been detained (~243 on the Three Powers Plaza on 8 January, 1,152+ on the morning of 9 January and hundreds more over the next months, totalling over 1,927 people detained on 2023 alone), of those, 1,430 had been sent to the "Papuda" and "Hive" penitential complexes, though only 73 of those remained in the penitentiaries, most having either been released or given other preventive measures. Only 8 of the arrested were charged, with most (~58) having only been accused (33 of those of participating in the acts and 25 for inciting, planning, or financing it); 7 police officers were also accused of negligence, thus being added to the total of 65 awaiting judgement. In addition, 2 of the arrested were sent to mental hospitals following their sentencing.

As of November 2024, 265 people had already been convicted and sentenced to jail terms ranging from 15 to 17 years by the Supreme Court of Brazil, therefore without any possibility of further appeal.

On 8 February 2024, the Brazilian Federal Police confiscated Bolsonaro's passport during a raid that also targeted numerous former and active officials, including former ministers and high-ranking Brazilian military officials. On February 25 Bolsonaro, himself investigated for his role in the 2023 attack, called for an amnesty for the convicts of the 8 January coup attempt during a rally in São Paulo.

==== Fines and damages ====
Since 9 January 2023, several lawsuits have been filed aiming to compensate and/or impose fines over the property damage caused by the attackers and their financers. Over $14 million BRL (nearly $2 million USD) in public property was lost during the attacks, according to the Attorney General of Brazil, who has successfully asked to freeze 18.5 million BRL (approximately US$3.5 million) from persons and companies who financed the perpetrators.

=== Participants ===
==== Analysis ====
The attack was widely reported by both the media and the rioters themselves in real time, with many people present (Journalists and rioters alike) posting livestreams, photos, selfies, videos, messages and/or audio from the attack online, including on platforms like Facebook, Twitter, Instagram, TikTok, Kwai, YouTube and Telegram. Some of the rioters were shown in videos (sometimes recorded by themselves) praying, screaming and/or crying during the attack, while some were gathering rocks (sometimes with the use of tools, such as pickaxes and hammers) to throw at police.

Several cases of violence against police, as well as vandalism, looting, and attempted arson were caught on both the buildings' security cameras and police body cameras. However, in some cases, rioters recorded themselves (or others) committing or admitting to these acts of violence. These images, audios and videos were later used by the authorities as proof for investigating, identifying, and prosecuting people involved, with some recordings later being released to the media by the government; Several people who were shown in the videos were later either detained, prosecuted, jailed, or put on the federal police's wanted list, including famous people and politicians such as Léo Indio, nephew of former president Jair Bolsonaro, who was arrested and later put on trial for participating in the riot.

Some flags present during the riot included the Empire of Brazil. Most rioters in general appeared to have no clear connection to any known or organized extremist group. Leadership was mostly decentralized and focused on the owners/leaders of the caravans which arrived earlier in Brasília; although some politicians, businessmen, and famous people were involved, none appeared to have any clear sign of being actual "organizers" of the protest, leading police to believe that the mob was mostly disorganized and united only through messages on Telegram, Facebook, and WhatsApp groups. Several organizers and financiers were, however, later identified, with many having been arrested or put on trial for financing, organizing and/or inciting the riot, while others remained wanted by the police.

== Reactions ==
Many journalists compared the events of the 8 January Brasília attacks to the January 6 United States Capitol attack almost exactly two years earlier. Several newspapers, including O Globo, Veja, and Folha de S.Paulo, characterised what happened as terrorism. O Estado de S. Paulo and El Mundo described the event as an attempted coup d'état. On 9 January, tens of thousands of people attended rallies against the rioters in many Brazilian cities. The Supreme Federal Court considered the attacks as terrorist acts.

== See also ==
- 2024 Brasília attack
