= List of Brazilian Federal Police operations =

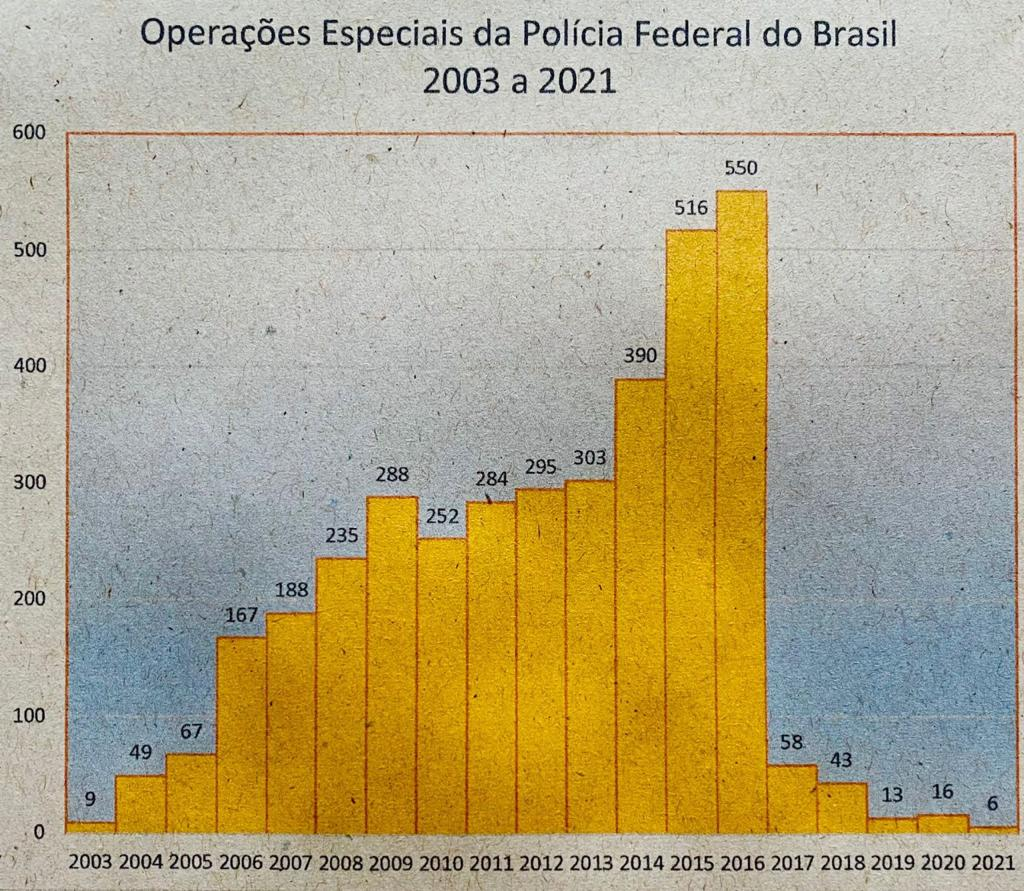
Number of special operations by the Federal Police of Brazil from 2003 to 2001

This is a list of the special operations conducted by the Federal Police of Brazil since 2003.

== 2003 - 2009 ==
=== 2003 ===
Number of Operations: 16

=== 2004 ===
Number of Operations:: 49

- Operation Feliz (January 22) - Operation Happy
- Operation Fraude Zero (February 10) - Operation Fraud Zero
- Operation Soro (March 5) - Operation Serum
- Operation Pandora (March 19) - Operation Pandora
- Operation Matusalém (April 15) - Operation Methuselah
- Operation Mamoré (April 20)
- Operation Barrilha (April 26)
- Operation Pindorama (May 13)
- Operation Shogun (June 1)
- Operation Rosa dos Ventos (June 5) - Operation Compass Rose
- Operation Tamar (June 19)
- Operation Lince II (June 23) - Operation Lynx
- Operation Pensacola (June 23)
- Operation Caso Unaí (July 27)
- Operation Orcrim Esa (August 5)
- Operation Zumbi (August 6) - Operation Zombie
- Operation Albatroz (August 10) - Operation Albatross
- Operation Farol da Colina (August 17) - Operation Lighthouse of the Hill
- Operation Cavalo de Troia II (October 20) - Operation Trojan Horse II
- Operation Pardal (October 25) - Operation Sparrow
- Operation Mucuripe (October 25)
- Operation Pororoca (November 4) -
- Operation Capela (November 5) - Operation Chapel
- Operation Poeira no Asfalto (November 8) - Operation Dust on the Asphalt
- Operation Cataratas (November 8) - Operation Waterfalls/Cataracts
- Operation Midas (November 10) -
- Operation Catuaba (November 12)
- Operation Faraó (November 18) - Operation Pharaoh
- Operation Águia II - Operation Eagle II
- Operation São José dos Campos (November 24)
- Operation Mascates (November 29) - Operation Merchants
- Operation Perseu (December 1) - Operation Perseus
- Operation Sentinela (December 2) - Operation Sentinel
- Operation Castelo (December 3) - Operation Castle
- Operation Mar Azul (December 7) - Operation Blue Sea
- Operation Cavalo de Aço (December 7) - Operation Steel Horse
- Operation Saia Justa (December 13) - Operation Tight Skirt
- Operation Chacal (December 13) - Operation Jackal
- Operation Fênix (December 15) - Operation Phoenix

=== 2005 ===
Number of Operations: 67

=== 2006 ===
Number of Operations: 167

=== 2007 ===
Number of Operations: 188

=== 2008 ===
Number of Operations: 235

=== 2009 ===
Number of Operations: 288

== 2010 - 2019 ==
=== 2010 ===
Number of Operations: 252

- Operação Maet
- Operação Voltante - Operation Steering Wheel

=== 2012 ===
Number of Operations: 295

- Operação Intolerância - Operation Intolerance
- Operation Porto Seguro - Operation Safe Harbor
- Operation Durkheim
- Operation Crackalves

=== 2013 ===
Number of Operations: 303

=== 2014 ===
Number of Operations: 390}

- Operation Car Wash

=== 2015 ===
Number of Operations: 516

=== 2016 ===
Number of Operations: 550

=== 2018 ===
- Operação Bravata

=== 2019 ===
- Operation Quinto Ano - Operation Fifth Year
- Operation Ad Infinitum, 60º fase da Operação Lava Jato - Operation Ad Infinitum
- Operation Disfaces de Mamom - Operation Mammon's Disguises
- Operation Inter Fratrem - Operation Among Brothers
- Operation Juntos e Shallow Now - Operation Together and Shallow Now
- Operation Escobar
- Operation Tergiversação - Operation Misrepresentation
- Operation Octopus
- Operation Alcatraz
- Operation Rock City
- Operation Chabu
- Operation Harpia Fase 1 - Operation Harpy Phase 1
- Operation Lamanai
- Operation Lobos I - Operation Wolves I
- Operation Faroeste - Operation Wild West

== 2020 - 2029 ==
=== 2020 ===
- Operation Último Lance
- Operation Narcos
- Operation Hórus
- Operation Calvário
- Operation Virus Infectio
- Operation Mercadores do Caos
- Operation Favorito
- Operation Dispneia
- Operation Placebo
- Operation Para Bellum
- Operation Probitas
- Operation Fiat Lux
- Operation Dark Side
- Operation Rei do Crime
- Operation Triângulo das Bermudas
- Operation Enterprise

=== 2022 ===
- Operation Contumácia - Operation Persistent Defiance
- Operation Galopeira

=== 2023 ===
- Operation Trapiche - Operation Pier
- Operation Lesa Pátria - Operation National Betrayal
- Operation Última Milha - Operation Last Mile

=== 2024 ===
- Operation Vigilância Aproximada - Operation Close Surveillance
- Operation Cheating
- Operation Acervo Illegal - Operation Illegal Archive
- Operation Harpia - Fase 2 - Operation Harpy - Phase 2
