= Renan Calheiros =

Brazilian politician

- Official portrait

Senator for Alagoas
- Incumbent
- Assumed office 1 February 1995
- Preceded by: Divaldo Suruagy

President of the Federal Senate
- In office 1 February 2013 – 1 February 2017
- Preceded by: José Sarney
- Succeeded by: Eunício Oliveira
- In office 14 February 2005 – 4 December 2007; Leave: 11 October 2007 – 4 December 2007
- Preceded by: José Sarney
- Succeeded by: Garibaldi Alves Filho

Minister of Justice
- In office 7 April 1998 – 1 July 1999
- President: Fernando Henrique Cardoso
- Preceded by: Iris Rezende
- Succeeded by: José Carlos Dias

Member of the Chamber of Deputies
- In office 1 February 1983 – 1 February 1991
- Constituency: Alagoas

Member of the Legislative Assembly of Alagoas
- In office 1 February 1979 – 1 February 1983
- Constituency: At-large

Personal details
- Born: 16 September 1955 (age 71) Murici, Alagoas, Brazil
- Party: MDB (since 1979)
- Spouse: Maria Verônica Rodrigues (m. 1973)
- Domestic partner: Mônica Veloso (Note: Extramarital relationship.) (2003–2007)
- Children: 3
- Parents: Olavo Calheiros Novais (father); Ivanilda Vasconcelos Calheiros (mother)
- Education: Federal University of Alagoas (UFAL)
- Nickname: Athlete / Justice

José Renan Vasconcelos Calheiros (Portuguese pronunciation: [ʁeˈnɐ̃ kaˈʎejɾus]; born 16 September 1955) is a Brazilian politician and former President of the Federal Senate of Brazil. He has represented the state of Alagoas in the senate as a member of the Brazilian Democratic Movement. since 1 February 1995. Renan's presidency of the Brazilian Senate, a term that started 1 February 2013, was revoked on 5 December 2016 by a minister of the Brazilian Supreme Court, Marco Aurélio Mello, who said that a person under investigation could not be in the line of succession for the presidency. However the Supreme Court decided 7 December 2016 that Renan could remain senate president, without being in the succession.

== Career ==
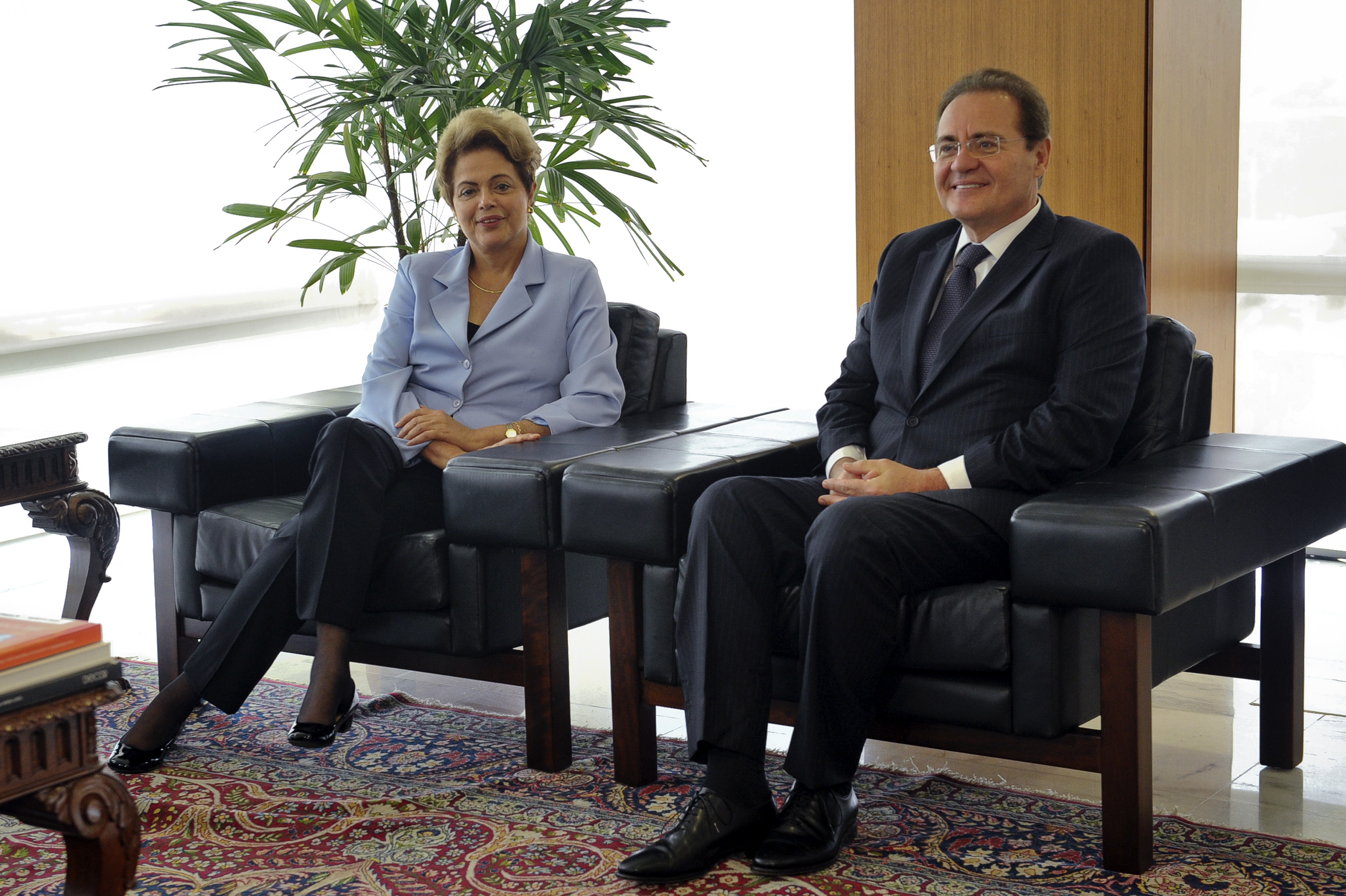
Calheiros meets with then-President Dilma Rousseff at the Planalto Palace in June 2015.

On 25 May 2007, Veja magazine accused Calheiros of accepting funds from a construction industry lobbyist, to pay child support for a child from a previous extramarital affair with broadcast journalist Mônica Veloso. In trying to justify the origin of the funds, subsequent investigations into Calheiros' business dealings led to other revelations of income tax fraud and the use of a proxy to buy a stake in a radio station. Calheiros was subject to a disciplinary inquiry by the senate's ethics committee on four different counts. On 12 September 2007, the senate voted by secret ballot against impeaching Calheiros on the lobbyist funds accusation. He still faces three separate inquiries on other charges. After the vote public outrage forced congress to eliminate secret ballot voting for ethics violations, meaning Calheiros' three other inquiries, if approved by the ethics committee, will be subject to an open ballot vote in the senate floor.

On 11 October 2007, Calheiros stepped down as president of the senate, taking a 45-day leave of absence from the position. The ethics inquiries continued to progress through the senate committees.

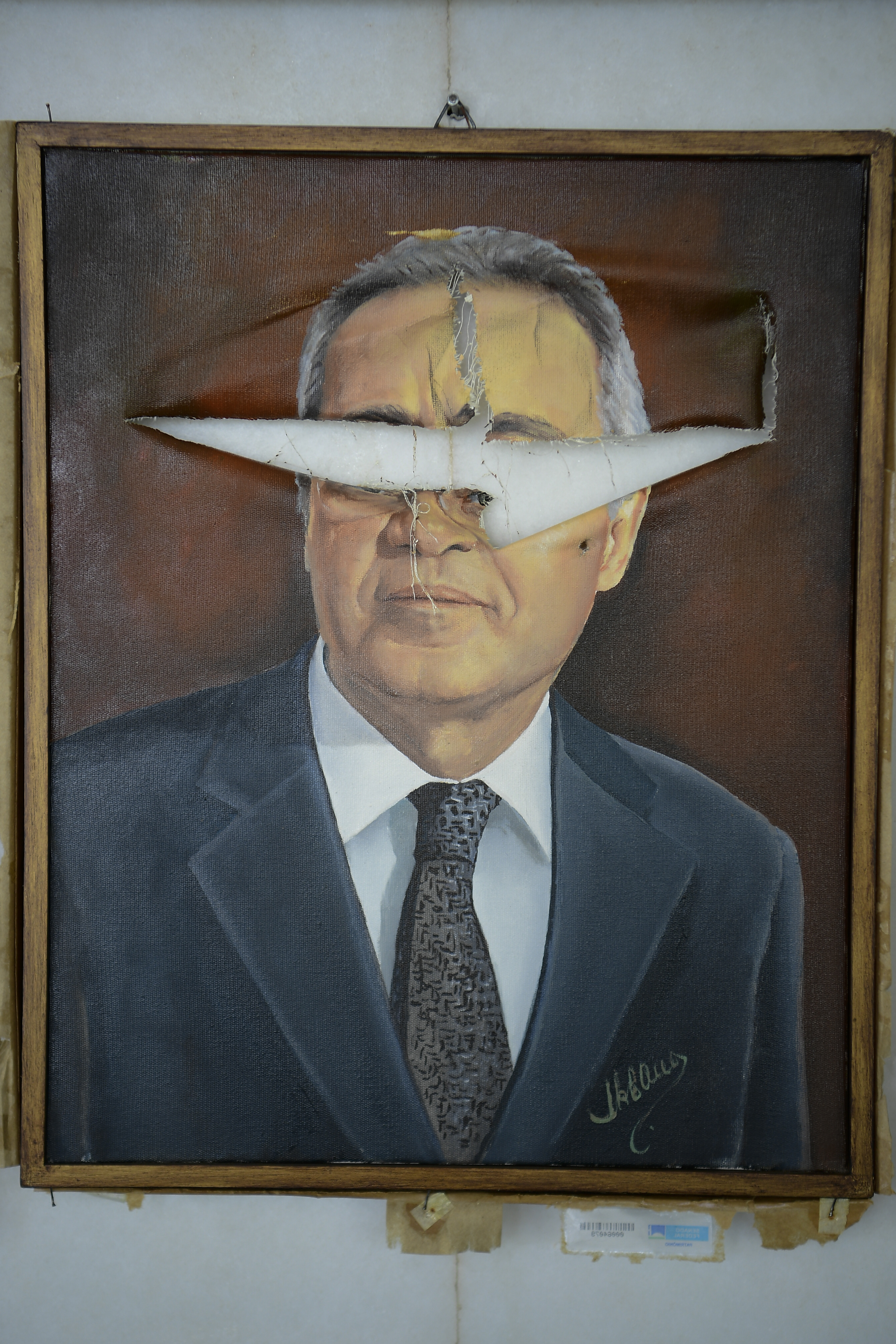
Portrait of Calheiros in the Palácio do Congresso Nacional, vandalized by Bolsonaro supporters during the 8 January Brasília attacks

Calheiros worked for both the Fernando Collor de Mello and Fernando Henrique Cardoso governments.

On 1 February 2013, he was again elected president of the Brazilian Senate. Due to the accusations mentioned above, many Brazilians became upset about his election and some started an online petition demanding Renan's impeachment. As of February 2013, it had been signed by more than 1.6 million Brazilians.

The Senate board (João Alberto, Sérgio Petecão, Zezé Perrella, Romero Jucá, Gladson Cameli, Vicentinho Alves) together with Renan Calheiros refused to obey an order from the Supreme Federal Court (Federal Supreme Court) to remove Calheiros from the presidency because he became defendant of embezzlement (peculation in the penal code). The Senate maneuvered so that the justice official could not handle the judicial notice and Calheiros refused to sign it.

The biggest implicated company, Odebrecht kept an entire department to coordinate the payment of bribes to politicians. In the Car Wash Operation, officers seized several electronic spreadsheets linking the payments to nicknames. Every corrupt politician received a nickname based on physical characteristics, public trajectory, personal infos, owned cars/boats, origin place or generic preferences. Renan Calheiro's nickname was 'Athlete' and 'Justice', referring to his morning routine of jogging and his position as president of Senate's Commission of Constitution and Justice.

== Notes ==
Political offices
Preceded by Jose de Jesus Filho	Minister of Justice; 1998–1999	Succeeded by José Carlos Dias
Preceded by José Sarney	President of the Federal Senate; 2005–2007; 2013–2017	Succeeded by Garibaldi Alves Filho
Preceded by José Sarney	President of the Federal Senate; 2005–2007; 2013–2017	Succeeded by Eunício Oliveira
