= Terrorism in Brazil =

Terrorism in Brazil has occurred since at least the 1940s.

== Definition ==
There is no legal or scientific consensus on the definition of terrorism. Various legal systems and government agencies use different definitions of terrorism, and governments have been reluctant to formulate an agreed-upon legally binding definition. Difficulties arise from the fact that the term has become politically and emotionally charged. A simple definition proposed to the United Nations Commission on Crime Prevention and Criminal Justice (CCPCJ) by terrorism studies scholar Alex P. Schmid in 1992, based on the already internationally accepted definition of war crimes, as "peacetime equivalents of war crimes", was not accepted.

Scholars have worked on creating various academic definitions, reaching a consensus definition published by Schmid and A. J. Jongman in 1988, with a longer revised version published by Schmid in 2011, some years after he had written that "the price for consensus [had] led to a reduction of complexity". The Cambridge History of Terrorism (2021), however, states that Schmid's "consensus" resembles an intersection of definitions, rather than a bona fide consensus.

The United Nations General Assembly condemned terrorist acts by using the following political description of terrorism in December 1994 (GA Res. 49/60):

Criminal acts intended or calculated to provoke a state of terror in the general public, a group of persons or particular persons for political purposes are in any circumstance unjustifiable, whatever the considerations of a political, philosophical, ideological, racial, ethnic, religious or any other nature that may be invoked to justify them.

== Terror organizations ==
=== Shindo Renmei ===
The Shindo Renmei were a Japanese-Brazilian terror organization whose attacks were focused on resistance to the Japanese surrender at the end of World War II; attacks were perpetrated against other Japanese-Brazilians.

=== Islamic terror groups ===
According to the Brazilian Federal Police, at least seven Islamic terror groups operate in Brazil:

- Al Qaeda
- Ansar al-Khilafah Brazil
- Jihad Media Battalion
- Hezbollah
- Hamas
- Islamic Jihad
- Al-Gama'a Al-Islamiyya
- Moroccan Islamic Combatant Group

These groups operate inside the national territory, and most are also known to operate on the border of Paraguay and Argentina with Brazil. According to author Jorge Lasmar, there are around 460 people linked to Hezbollah in the region since the 2000s.

== Under the Brazilian military government ==
During the Brazilian military government from 1964 to 1985, terrorism was a term frequently used by the state. All forms of opposition to the military regime were considered forms of terrorism; opposition members were deemed "terrorists."

Some groups engaged in urban guerrilla attacks against the regime; in a 1969 panflet, ALN members described themselves as ''Guerrillas, terrorists, and robbers, not men who depend on votes from other revolutionaries or whoeve to fulfill their duty to make the revolution.''

During this period groups like the Brazilian Anti-Communist Alliance (taking inspiration in the name and actions of the Argentine Anticommunist Alliance.) claimed a ring of bombing attacks against Brazilian Press Association, the Order of Attorneys of Brazil, the Brazilian Center for Analysis and Planning, Editora Civilização Brasileira and the residence of journalist Roberto Marinho. An incident of right-wing terrorism known as the Riocentro attack occurred in 1981, perpetrated by a sector of the military dissatisfied with the democratic opening of the regime.

== Recent history ==
On 21 July 2016, two weeks before the scheduled start of the 2016 Summer Olympics, the Brazilian Federal Police busted an Islamic jihadist terrorist ring plotting to wreak havoc in a manner similar to the 1972 Munich massacre, but they had rather poor preparation compared to their objectives. 10 people suspected to be allied with ISIS were arrested, and two more were on the run.

On 2 May 2017, Palestinian migrants threw a homemade bomb at far-right protesters, leaving several injured in São Paulo.

On 6 September 2018, the right-wing presidential candidate Jair Bolsonaro was stabbed during a political campaign in Juiz de Fora, Minas Gerais.

On 13 March 2019, two former students opened fire at a Brazilian school in Suzano, São Paulo. The pair killed at least five teenagers as well as two school officials before committing suicide in an attack that police said was inspired by the 1999 Columbine High School Massacre in the United States.

On 2 September 2021, a man who was planning Islamic terrorist attacks was arrested in Maringá.

On 8 November 2023, the Federal Police of Brazil arrested 2 men and carried out 11 search and seizure warrants in the states of São Paulo, Minas Gerais, and Brasília, in an operation against the terrorist group Hezbollah, which was planning attacks on synagogues in the country.

Several newspapers, including O Globo, Veja, and Folha de S. Paulo, characterised the 2023 invasion of the Brazilian Congress as terrorism.

In June 2024, Brazil deported a palestinian citizen, Muslim Abuumar, claiming he was a Hamas operative.

On 13 November 2024, a suicide bomber exploded a device in front of the Supreme Federal Court Palace and another one in his car at the National Congress parking lot. The Federal Police of Brazil and the Bomb Squad released the area and the Forensics Medical Institute removed the corpse only on the next morning.

On 21 March 2025, a man who had an arsenal of weapons and flags of ISIS and Al Qaeda was arrested in Porto Alegre.

On 3 May 2025, an adult and a teenager who planned to bomb Lady Gaga's free concert on Copacabana beach in Rio de Janeiro were arrested. The group that planned the attack were organizing on Discord, targeting children and LGBTQ+ people.

On May 28, 2026, the United States Department of State designated two of Brazil's largest criminal organizations, Comando Vermelho (CV) and the Primeiro Comando da Capital (PCC), as Specially Designated Global Terrorists (SDGTs) under the authority of Executive Order 13224, and announced its intention to formally classify both as Foreign Terrorist Organizations (FTOs). The State Department justified the action by highlighting that the groups command thousands of members and orchestrate brutal attacks against Brazilian police, public officials, and civilians. Furthermore, the designation responds to the syndicates' extensive involvement in drug production, weapons trafficking, and money laundering, with U.S. officials warning that their illicit networks directly threaten U.S. national security.

The U.S. government cited the protection of national security interests as the justification for this decision, following similar classifications made by Argentina and Paraguay in late 2025. This designation conflicts with Brazilian legislation, as under Brazil's 2016 Anti-Terrorism Law (Law No. 13.260/2016), an act is only considered terrorism if it is motivated by xenophobia, or by discrimination or prejudice based on race, color, ethnicity, or religion, with the intent to provoke social or generalized terror.

According to the newspaper Metrópoles, citing data from the Ministry of Justice and Public Security's Cyber Operations Laboratory (Ciberlab), at least 132 suspects involved in digital crimes linked to extremism, hate speech, and incitement to violence were identified across at least 10 police operations in 2026. These operations took place primarily in the states of São Paulo, Rio de Janeiro, and Minas Gerais.

In August 2026, the Ministry of Justice and Public Security announced the foil of a cell who was planning a series of attacks against government buildings in Brasilia during the 2026 Elections.

== Responses and counterterrorism efforts ==
Before the passing of the Anti-Terrorism Act, the Brazilian government had four pieces of terrorism legislation pending in Congress:

- Visa denials – in 2011, legislation was introduced to deny visas to persons and/or expel foreigners convicted or accused of a terrorist act in another country;
- Terrorism during the World Cup – in 2011, legislation was introduced that deals with specific crimes, including terrorism, during and preceding the 2014 FIFA World Cup;
- Penal code update – legislation in 2012 sought to update the Brazilian penal code to include sentencing guidelines for terrorism crimes;
- Terrorism definitions – legislation in 2013 sought to define terrorism under the Brazilian Constitution.

In 2016, Brazil passed the Anti-Terrorism Act (Law 13.260), imposing 12-30 years of reclusion for those convicted for acts of terrorism, including the usage or threat to use explosives, toxic agents or sabotaging public infrastructure motivated by xenophobia, discrimination or prejudice to cause social panic. Article 5 XLIII of the Brazilian Constitution declares that terrorism is a non-bailable crime.

=== Criticism ===
There is a large concentration of Middle Eastern immigrants in the area near the Paraguay, Argentina, and Brazil borders. Some authorities monitoring the area have stated that Brazil should participate more in the international fight against terrorism.

The Financial Action Task Force (FATF) noted that while the overall risk of terrorist financing in the country remains relatively low, Brazil still needs to significantly enhance its risk understanding, mitigation, and practical implementation of counter-terrorism measures. The assessment highlighted that despite some improvements in legal frameworks, the country suffers from critical gaps in execution and operational effectiveness regarding how it tracks, investigates, and prevents potential terroristactivities.

== See also ==
- Crime in Brazil
- Terrorism in the United States
- List of attacks on legislatures
- Islamic terrorism in Europe
- Hezbollah in Latin America
- List of terrorist incidents
- Hindu terrorism
  - Violence against Christians in India
  - Violence against Muslims in independent India
- Left-wing terrorism
- Right-wing terrorism
- Terrorist
- Suicide attack
- Narcoterrorism
