= Anderson Torres =

Former Minister of Justice of Brazil

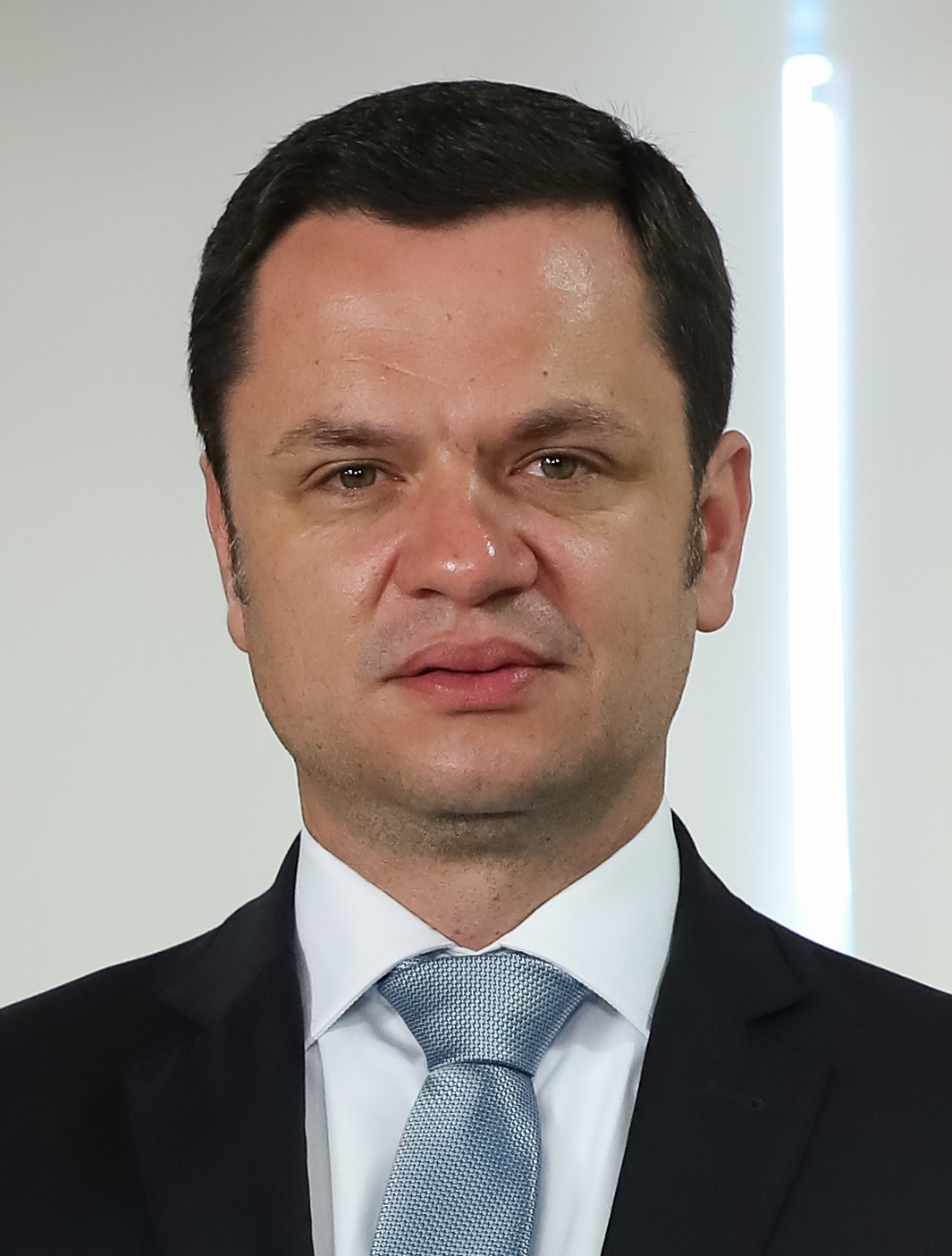
- Torres in April 2021

Minister of Justice and Public Security
- In office 30 March 2021 – 1 January 2023
- Preceded by: André Mendonça
- Succeeded by: Flávio Dino

Secretary of Public Security of the Federal District
- In office 2 January 2023 – 8 January 2023
- Governor: Ibaneis Rocha
- Preceded by: Júlio Danilo
- Succeeded by: Ricardo Cappelli (by federal executive decree)
- In office 1 January 2019 – 29 March 2021
- Governor: Ibaneis Rocha
- Preceded by: Cristiano Barbosa Sampaio
- Succeeded by: Júlio Danilo

Personal details
- Born: Anderson Gustavo Torres; 1976 (age 49–50) Brasília, Federal District, Brazil
- Party: UNIÃO (2022–present)
- Other political affiliations: PSL (2021–22)
- Education: University Center of Brasília (LL.B.)
- Profession: Chief of police (expelled)
- Criminal information
- Status: In prison
- Convictions: Attempted violent abolition of the democratic rule of law; Attempted coup d'état; Participation in an armed criminal organization; Qualified damage; Deterioration of protected heritage property
- Trial: Trial for the 2022–2023 Brazilian coup plot (8 – 11 September 2025)
- Penalty: 24 years in prison

Details
- Date apprehended: 25 November 2025
- Imprisoned at: 19th Military Police Battalion; Papuda Penitentiary Complex; Brasília, Federal District

Anderson Gustavo Torres (Brazilian Portuguese: [ˈɐ̃deʁsõ ɡusˈtavu ˈtoʁis]; born 1976) is a Brazilian chief of police of the Federal Police, who served as Minister of Justice and Public Security under Jair Bolsonaro. Following the 2023 invasion of the Brazilian Congress, Torres' arrest was ordered by the Supreme Federal Court.

== Early life and education ==
Torres holds a law degree from the Central University of Brasília, with a specialization in police science, criminal investigation and strategic intelligence at the Superior School of War. He was professor at the Civil Police Academy of Rondônia, Federal District Military Police Academy and the National Academy of Police.

== Early career ==
He was typistcopist at the Civil Police of the Federal District and is currently a police chief of the Federal Police. Coordinated the main investigations focused in the fight against the organized crime in the Superintendence of the Federal Police in Roraima, between 2003 and 2005. At the institution, he worked in Roraima and in operations at the Raposa Serra do Sol indigenous reserve, which arrested in 2008 the farmer Paulo César Quartiero, leader of the rice farmers of the regions.

In the Chamber of Deputies, Torres coordinated committees about subjects related to public security and fight against the organized crime, as well as he was chief of staff of deputy Fernando Francischini (PSL-PR).

From 2019 to 2021, he was State Secretary of Public Security of the Federal District, nominated by Governor Ibaneis Rocha.

== Minister of Justice and Public Security ==
On 29 March 2021, his nomination was announced by President Jair Bolsonaro for the office of Minister of Justice and Public Security. Torres was nominated and took office on the following day.

In April 2021, it was published that Torres filed his membership to the Social Liberal Party, aiming the 2022 elections and became President of the party in the Federal District. On January 2, 2023 Torres was again appointed as Secretary of Public Security of the Federal District.

=== 2023 dismissal and arrest ===
On January 8, 2023, Torres was dismissed from his position as Secretary of Public Security of the Brasilia Federal District due to the 2023 invasion of the Brazilian Congress. The Supreme Court of Brazil also issued an arrest warrant for alleged inaction and collusion with the rioters. Torres denied the allegations. On January 14, 2023, he was arrested upon his return to Brasília.

Political offices
Preceded by Cristiano Barbosa Sampaio	State Secretary of Public Security of the Federal District; 2019–21	Succeeded by Júlio Danilo
Preceded by André Mendonça	Minister of Justice and Public Security; 2021–2022	Succeeded by Flávio Dino
