= Cathedral of Brasília =

Roman Catholic cathedral in Brazil

Metropolitan Cathedral of Our Lady of Aparecida Catedral Metropolitana Nossa Senhora Aparecida
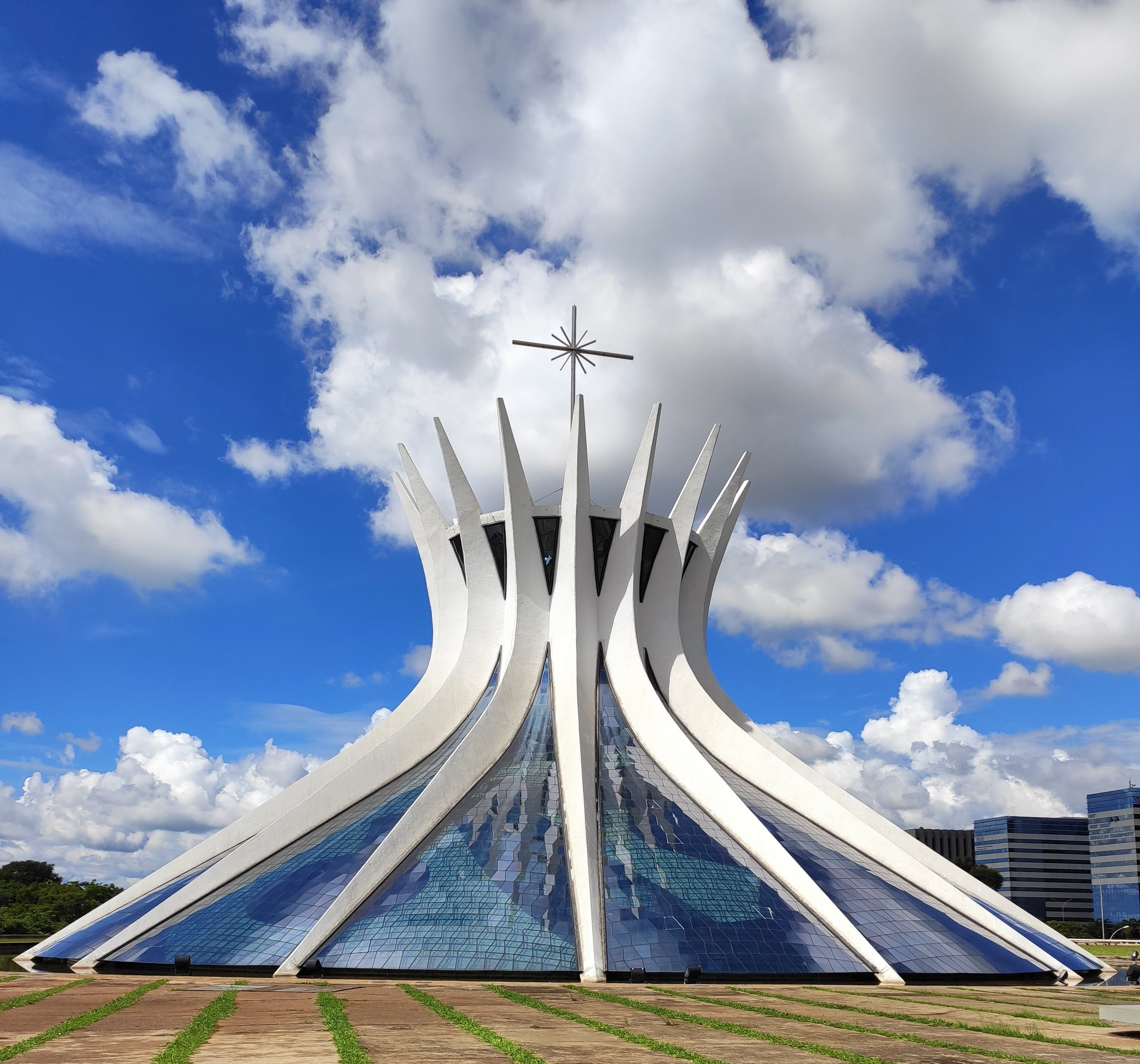

Religion
- Affiliation: Roman Catholic
- Diocese: Archdiocese of Brasília
- Ecclesiastical or organizational status: Cathedral

Location
- Location: Brasília, Brazil
- Interactive map of Metropolitan Cathedral of Our Lady of Aparecida; Catedral Metropolitana Nossa Senhora Aparecida
- Coordinates: 15°47′54″S 47°52′32″W

Architecture
- Architect: Oscar Niemeyer
- Type: Church
- Style: Modernist
- Groundbreaking: September 12, 1958; 67 years ago
- Completed: May 31, 1970; 56 years ago
- Capacity: 4000

The Cathedral of Brasília (Portuguese: Catedral Metropolitana de Brasília, "Metropolitan Cathedral of Brasília") is the Roman Catholic cathedral serving Brasília, Brazil, and serves as the seat of the Archdiocese of Brasília. It was designed by Brazilian architect Oscar Niemeyer and engineered by Brazilian structural engineer Joaquim Cardozo, and was completed and dedicated on May 31, 1970.

== Description ==
The cathedral is a hyperboloid structure constructed from 16 concrete columns weighing 90 tons each.

In the square access to the cathedral are four 2.5-meter (8 ft 2 in) tall bronze sculptures representing the four Evangelists, created by sculptors Alfredo Ceschiatti and Dante Croce in 1968. Also outside the cathedral, to the right as visitors face the entrance, stands a 20-meter (66 ft) tall bell tower containing four large bells donated by Spanish residents of Brazil and cast in Miranda de Ebro. At the entrance of the cathedral is a pillar with passages from the life of Mary, mother of Jesus, painted by Athos.

A 12-meter (39 ft) wide, 40-centimeter (16 in) deep reflecting pool surrounds the cathedral roof and helps cool the building. Visitors pass under this pool when entering the cathedral.

The cathedral can hold up to 4,000 people. The oval baptistery is to the left of the entrance, and can be entered either from the cathedral or via a spiral staircase from the entrance plaza. The walls of the baptistery are covered in ceramic tiles painted in 1977 by Athos Bulcão. Offices for the Archdiocese of Brasília were completed in 2007 next to the cathedral. The 3,000-square-metre (32,000 sq ft) building connects directly to the cathedral underground.

Visitors enter into the cathedral through a tunnel and emerge into a bright space with a glass roof. The outer roof of the cathedral is composed of 16 pieces of fiberglass, each 10 meters (33 ft) wide at the base and 30 meters (98 ft) long inserted between the concrete pillars. Under this is suspended a 2,000-square-meter (22,000 sq ft) stained glass work created in 1990 by Marianne Peretti in shades of blue, green, white and brown.

Over the nave are sculptures of three angels suspended by steel cables. These were created in 1970 by Alfredo Ceschiatti with the collaboration of Dante Croce. The shortest is 2.22 meters (7 ft 3 in) long and weighs 100 kilograms (220 lb), the middle 3.4 meters (11 ft) long and weighs 200 kilograms (440 lb), and the largest is 4.25 meters (13.9 ft) long and weighs 300 kilograms (660 lb). The altar was donated by Pope Paul VI and the image of the patron saint Our Lady of Aparecida is a replica of the original which is in Aparecida, São Paulo. The Way of the Cross is a work of Di Cavalcanti.

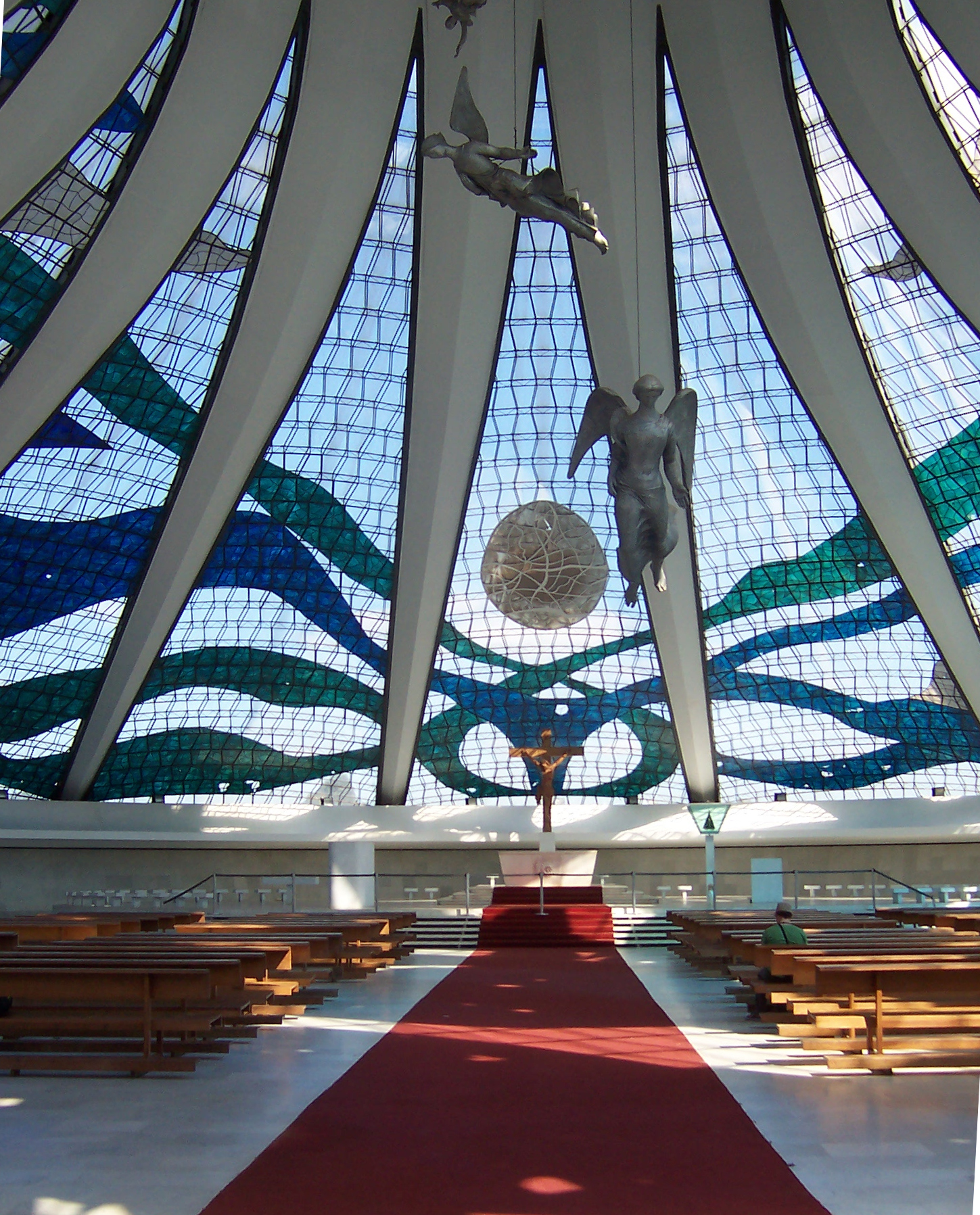
Interior with angel sculptures

Under the main altar is a small chapel accessible by steps from on either side of and behind the altar.

== Artistic interpretation ==
The Cathedral of Brasília, officially the Metropolitan Cathedral of Our Lady of Aparecida (Catedral Metropolitana Nossa Senhora Aparecida), dedicated to the Blessed Virgin Mary under her title of Our Lady of Aparecida, proclaimed by the Church as Queen and Patroness of Brazil, was designed by the architect Oscar Niemeyer and projected by the structural engineer Joaquim Cardozo.

This concrete-framed hyperboloid structure appears with its glass roof to be reaching up, open, to heaven. Most of the cathedral is below ground, with only the 70-meter (230 ft) diameter 42-meter (138 ft) roof of the cathedral, the ovoid roof of the baptistry, and the bell tower visible above ground. The shape of the roof is based on a hyperboloid of revolution with asymmetric sections. The hyperboloid structure consists of 16 identical concrete columns assembled on site. These columns, having hyperbolic section and weighing 90 tonnes (99 tons), represent two hands moving upwards to heaven.

== History ==
The cornerstone was laid on September 15, 1958, and the structure was finished on April 21, 1960, with only the roof structure visible above ground. Once the presidential term of Juscelino Kubitschek ended, the big push to finish many structures in Brasília stalled. Although it is likely that Kubitschek intended the cathedral as an "ecumenical cathedral" to be paid for by the state and open to all faiths, governments after that did not provide funding and the building was eventually turned over to the Catholic Church to complete. The cathedral was consecrated on October 12, 1968 (still with no roof), and was officially opened by Cardinal D. Eugenio Salles on May 31, 1970. The ovoid baptistry was dedicated on October 5, 1977, and the cathedral was declared a national historic and artistic monument on July 15, 1990.

The cathedral sees some 1,000,000 visitors each year.

Coinciding with the 50th anniversary of Brasília, major renovations were begun on April 21, 2012 to update and repair the building and infrastructure, and address issues with the roof. The exterior glazing is being replaced, and the original stained glass designed by Marianne Peretti (which used hand made glass and thus varied widely in thickness) is being replaced by uniform glass cut and assembled in Brazil from plates manufactured in Germany. In addition to the roof repairs, all marble surfaces will be polished, concrete repaired and painted, the angels in the nave will be cleaned and re-mounted, and the bell mechanisms will be replaced. The cathedral will be open to the public during renovation.
