= Jihad Media Battalion =

South American terrorist organization

Jihad Media Battalion is a jihadist organization active in South America. The group is among a number of Jihadi groups active in the Tri-Border Area (TBA) of Brazil, Paraguay and Argentina.

== Founding ==
The group was founded following the 2003 invasion of Iraq. The group's primary aim was to disseminate videos of insurgents in Iraq, including videos of suicide bombings as well as messages from leaders of the insurgency. Jihad Media Battalion's video messages are understood to have been of somewhat better quality than the videos produced in Iraq.

== Leadership ==
According to the Brazilian Federal Police, the head of the group is a Lebanese national known as K. H. Ali who was arrested by the Brazilian authorities in 2009. Ali, who was based in Brazil, was suspected of financing terrorism. According to the Brazilian magazine Veja, Ali ran an internet cafe in São Paulo while running what is described as "Al-Qaeda's online communications arm." They reached 17 countries, disseminating communications from Al-Qaeda's leadership and publicizing terror attacks.
