= Brazilian Anti-Communist Alliance =

Far-right terrorist organization of Brazil

The Brazilian Anti-Communist Alliance (AAB) (Note: Brazilian Portuguese: Aliança Anticomunista Brasileira) was a far-right terrorist organization that operated during the military dictatorship in Brazil. It was responsible for several bomb attacks in 1976, including against the Brazilian Press Association, the Order of Attorneys of Brazil, the Brazilian Center for Analysis and Planning and the residence of journalist Roberto Marinho.

== Origin ==
In the early 1960s, the first anti-communist civil-military groups that used violent tactics emerged in Brazil, the main ones being the Anti-Communist Movement (MAC) and the Command for Hunting Communists (CCC). These groups practiced, still under the João Goulart government, acts of terrorism that extended until the early 1970s. At first, the focus of these groups was on stopping the advance of the left in Brazil, during the Cold War in that fear of communism was widespread. After the Coup of 64, the focus shifted to the formation of "security communities" where civilians and military members of the official intelligence and repression bodies split into several paramilitary groups, including AAB, to identify, pursue and torture opponents of the regime. The AAB was inspired by the Argentine death squad Triple A.

== See also ==
- Anti-communism
