= Jorge Zalszupin =

Polish-Brazilian architect (1922–2020)

Jorge Zalszupin (1 June 1922 – 17 August 2020) was a Polish-Brazilian architect and designer noted for modern design. He was born in Warsaw, Poland. In the 1950s Zalszupin founded L'Atelier, a furniture design manufacturer in Sao Paulo, Brazil. Zalszupin's one-off designs were included by Oscar Niemeyer in the Palácio da Alvorada and Palácio do Planalto.
