= Athos Bulcão =

Brazilian painter and sculptor (1918–2008)

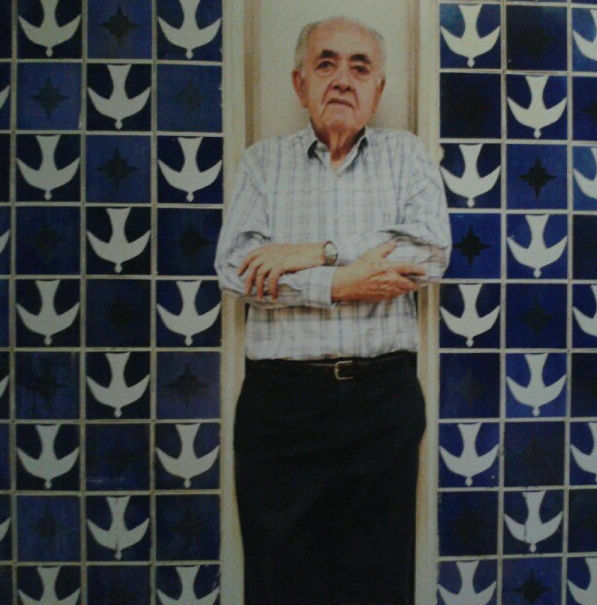
- Born: July 2, 1918; Rio de Janeiro, Brazil
- Died: July 31, 2008 (aged 90); Brasília, Brazil
- Known for: Creating tile patterns
- Style: Patterns and shapes

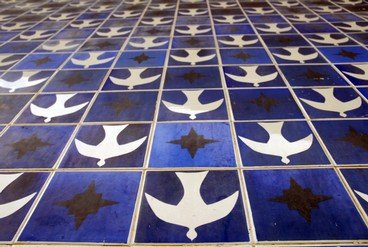
An example of Bulcão's art.

Athos Bulcão (July 2, 1918 – July 31, 2008) was a Brazilian painter and sculptor. He was born in Rio de Janeiro.

== Biography ==
Athos Bulcão was born in Rio de Janeiro on July 2, 1918.

In the 1940s he assisted Cândido Portinari with the "São Francisco de Assis" painting at the Pampulha Church, in Belo Horizonte. Later he moved to Paris, where he lived until 1949.

Returning to Brazil, he became one of the collaborators of the construction of Brasília, taking part in several of Oscar Niemeyer's projects. In 1958 he moved to Brasília, where he lived until his death in 2008.

Athos Bulcão died in Brasília on July 31, 2008, due to complications from Parkinson's disease.
