= Civil Police of the Federal District =

Police force in the Federal District, Brazil

Civil Police of the Federal District Polícia Civil do Distrito Federal
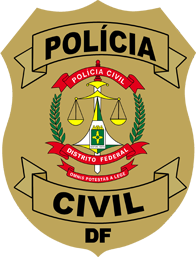
- Abbreviation: PCDF

Agency overview
- Formed: 1808; 218 years ago

Jurisdictional structure
- Operations jurisdiction: Federal District, Brazil
- Legal jurisdiction: As per operations jurisdiction

Operational structure
- Headquarters: Complexo da PCDF, Brasília - DF

The Civil Police of the Federal District (Portuguese: Polícia Civil do Distrito Federal) is the investigative police force for the Federal District of Brazil, which contains the capital Brasilia. The Civil Police report to the Governor of the Federal District and is linked to the State Secretariat of Public Security.

== History ==
In 1808, following the French invasion of European Portugal, the Portuguese Royal Family and Government transferred to Brazil and established Rio de Janeiro as the new capital of the Portuguese Empire. In Rio, the government established the General Intendency of the Police of the Court and of the State of Brazil, modelled after the similar body existing in Lisbon, as the central judiciary police organization. This organization was the forerunner of the Civil Police of Rio de Janeiro.

In 1960, with the creation of the new capital in Brasilia, the government created the Civil Police of the Federal District, using officers from the Rio police.

== Main institutional functions ==
Practice, with exclusivity, all the necessary acts for the investigation of criminal offenses and preparation of the police investigation; To promote the recruitment, selection, training, improvement and professional and cultural development of the civil police; Organize and execute the registration of civil and criminal identification; Maintain the police statistical service in compliance with statistical and research institutes in order to provide accurate and up-to-date information on crime, violence and traffic infractions; Collaborate with the Criminal Justice, providing for the enforcement of the arrest warrants issued by the judicial authorities, providing the necessary information for the investigation and prosecution of the cases and to carry out the actions, reasonably requested by the judge and members of the Public Prosecutor's Office in the police investigation files

== Careers ==
- Chief Police Delegate
- Medical-Legal Expert
- Forensics expert
- Police Papilopscopist expert
- Police Agent
- Police clerk
- Custody agent
