= Balthazar Martinot =

French master clockmaker

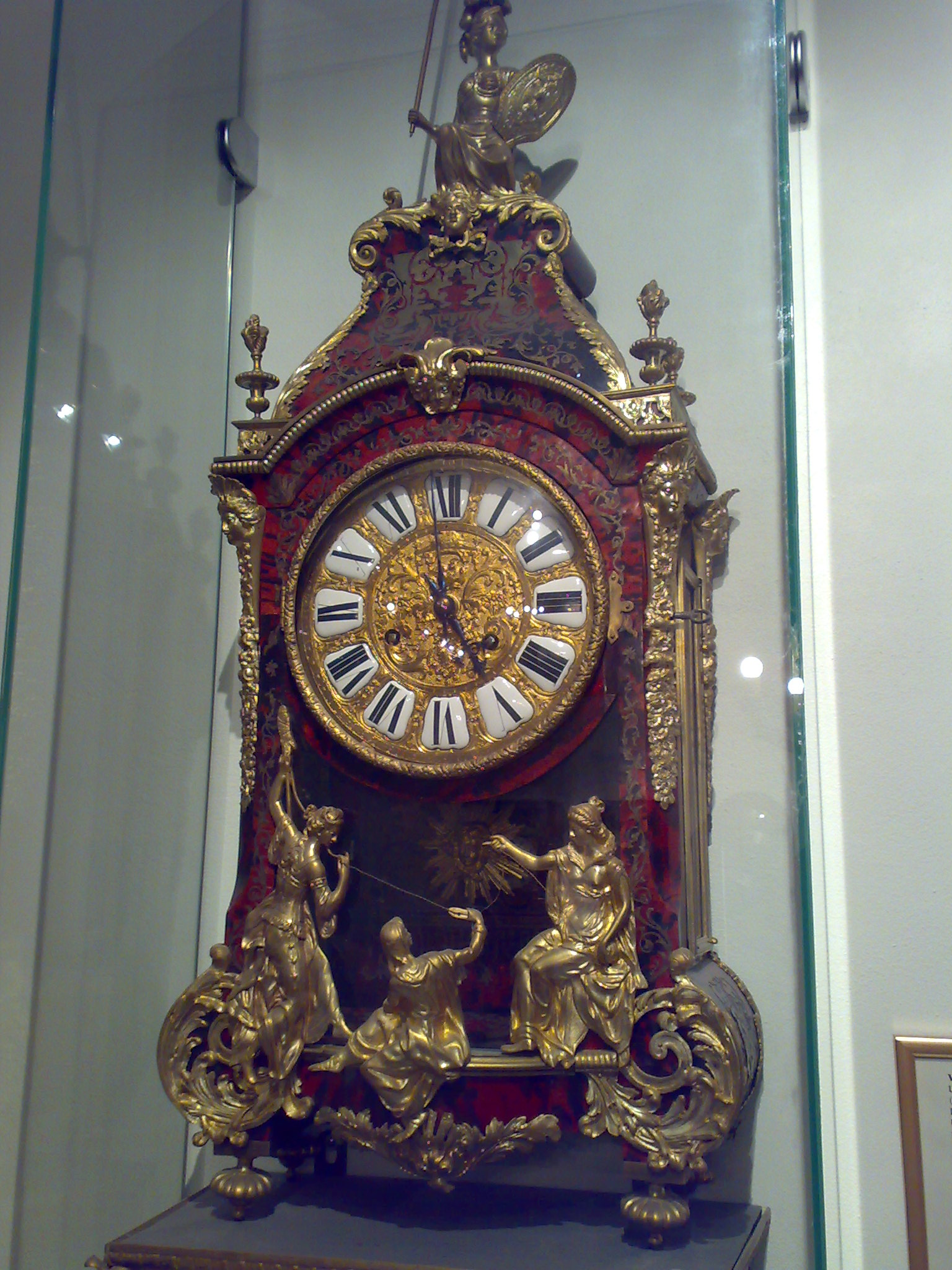
A clock made by Balthazar Martinot, 1678

Coat of arm of the family of the clockmakers Martinot.

Balthazar Martinot (1636–1714) was a French clockmaker, and valet de chambre of the Queen and the King. Martinot was considered one of the most famous clockmakers in Europe of his time. He made clocks for the French, European and East Asian markets.

== Biography ==
Balthazar Martinot was born in Rouen, the son of Balthazar Martinot I (1610–1697), Gouverneur du Gros Horloge in Rouen. His brothers, Claude (1637-after 1697), Etienne (1639–1702) and Gilles (1658–1726) were also clockmakers of repute and in turn Martinot II sired Balthazar-Louis Martinot, who became Ecuyer and Valet de la Garde-Robe du Roi. Unlike his father, Balthazar Martinot worked in Paris from circa 1660, where he was established at rue Galande in 1683 and Quai des Orfèvres in 1697.

His daughter Anne Martinot married the king's goldsmith Philippe Van Dievoet. He retired to Saint-Germain-en-Laye in 1710, a few years before his death.

== Clockmaking career ==
In 1665 he succeeded his father-in-law, Pierre Belon, as Valet de Chambre-Horloger Ordinaire de la Reine, Anne of Austria. He was later appointed Horloger Ordinaire du Conseil du Roi, Garde-Visiteur, 1678–79 and 1693-95. His eilte clients included Louis XIV, the Grand Dauphin, the Ducs d’Aumont and de La Trémoille, the Prince de Rohan, the Marquis d’Argenson, the Comtesse de Polignac, the Cardinal de Gesvres, the Présidents du Harlay, de Lamoignon, de Maison and many others.

He also sold several clocks to the King of Siam in 1685 and supplied a number to Constantinople. An inventory of 1700 revealed that he held the largest stock of clocks in Paris, while five years previously he had organized a significant lottery in association with his colleague, Nicholas Gribelin.

His clocks were housed in cases made by Jean-Michel Ziegler and André-Charles Boulle. His works are now installed in collections including the Musée du Louvre, Musée de Cluny and Musée National des Techniques, Paris; the Musée des Arts Décoratifs, Lyons; Musée de Saint-Pierre; Musée de Pau and Château de Champs; the Museum der Zeitmessung Beyer, Zurich; Musée d’Horlogerie de La Chaux-de-Fonds; the Mathematisch-Physikalischer Salon, Dresden; the Victoria and Albert Museum, London and the Museum of Art, Cleveland, Ohio.'

The Clock of Brasília's Palácio do Planalto was destroyed, during the Invasion of the Brazilian Congress on 8 January 2023.
