= Marianne Peretti =

French-Brazilian artist (1927–2022)

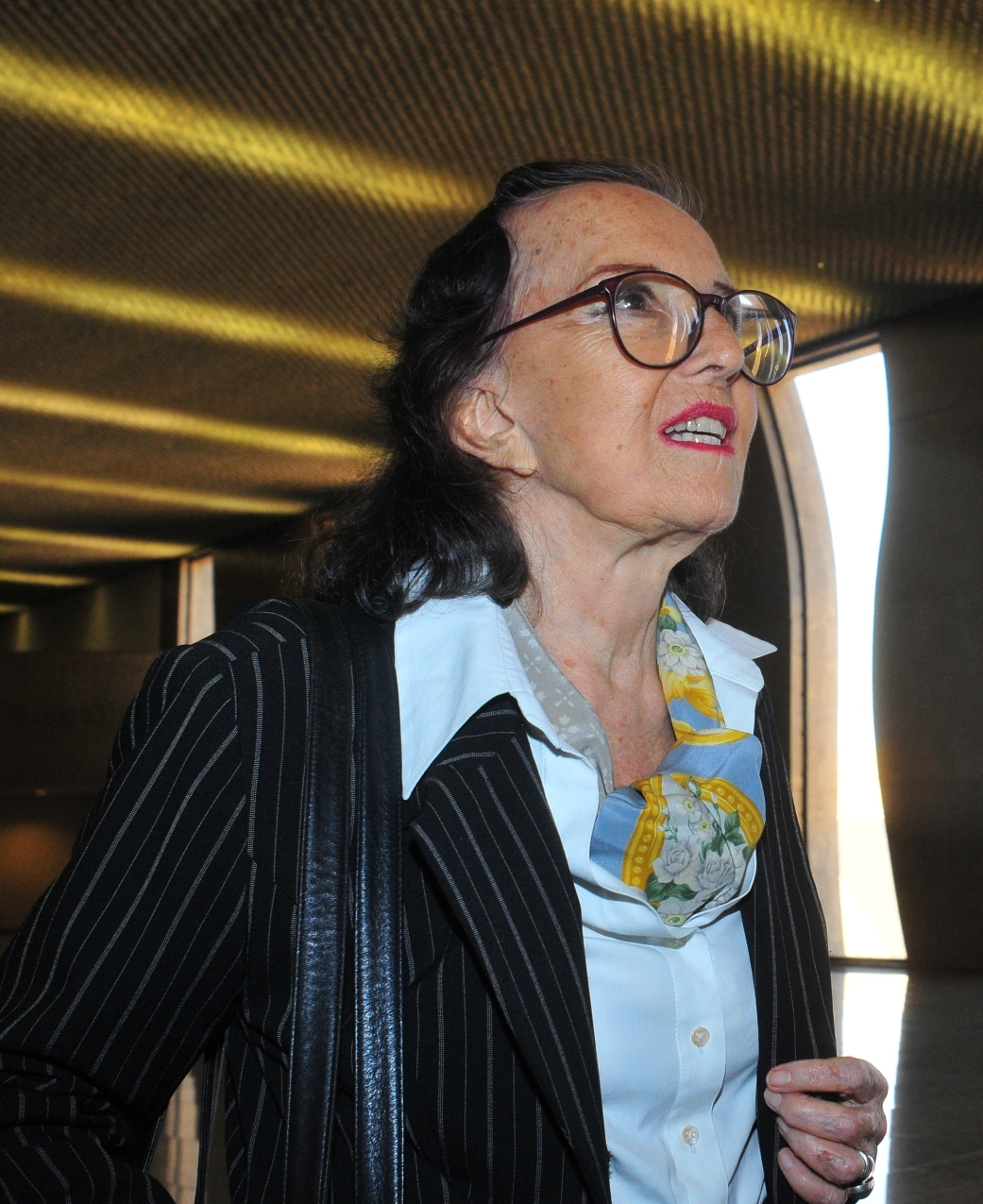
- Peretti in 2011
- Born: Marie Anne Antoinette Hélène Peretti; December 13, 1927; Paris, France
- Died: April 25, 2022 (aged 94); Recife, Brazil
- Education: École nationale supérieure des arts décoratifs Académie de la Grande Chaumière

Marie Anne Antoinette Hélène Peretti (13 December 1927 – 25 April 2022) was a French-Brazilian artist.

== Biography ==
Peretti was born in Paris. Her mother was the French model Antoinette Louise Clotilde Ruffier, and her father was João de Medeiros Peretti, a Brazilian historian. In France, Peretti studied at the École nationale supérieure des arts décoratifs and Académie de la Grande Chaumière. Still in France, she illustrated various books and magazines and made her first exposition.

Peretti has lived in Brazil since 1953, when she moved to São Paulo. There, she won the award for best book cover at the São Paulo Art Biennial. Since then, she has made various independent exhibitions and worked with various architects.

== Main works ==
There are several Peretti works in various cities. In Brasília, she designed the stained glasses of the Cathedral of Brasília, Panteão da Pátria, Palace of the Jaburu, Chamber of Deputies of Brazil and Federal Senate of Brazil, Superior Court of Justice and Memorial JK.

In Recife the stained glass for the chapel of the Federal Court of the 5th Region (TRF/5ª), of the Court of Justice of Pernambuco (TJPE) and the bronze sculpture at the hall of the Professor Barreto Guimarães School of Public Accounts of the Court of Auditors of Pernambuco are her works.

She made a transparent sculpture for the library of the Memorial of the Latin America, and a big bronze sculpture for the old Latin American Parliament building, in São Paulo.

In Rio de Janeiro, Peretti made the mural of the Museum of Samba at Sambadrome Marquês de Sapucaí. The stained glass at the Cabanagem Memorial, in Belém, is also her work.

== Partnership with Oscar Niemeyer ==
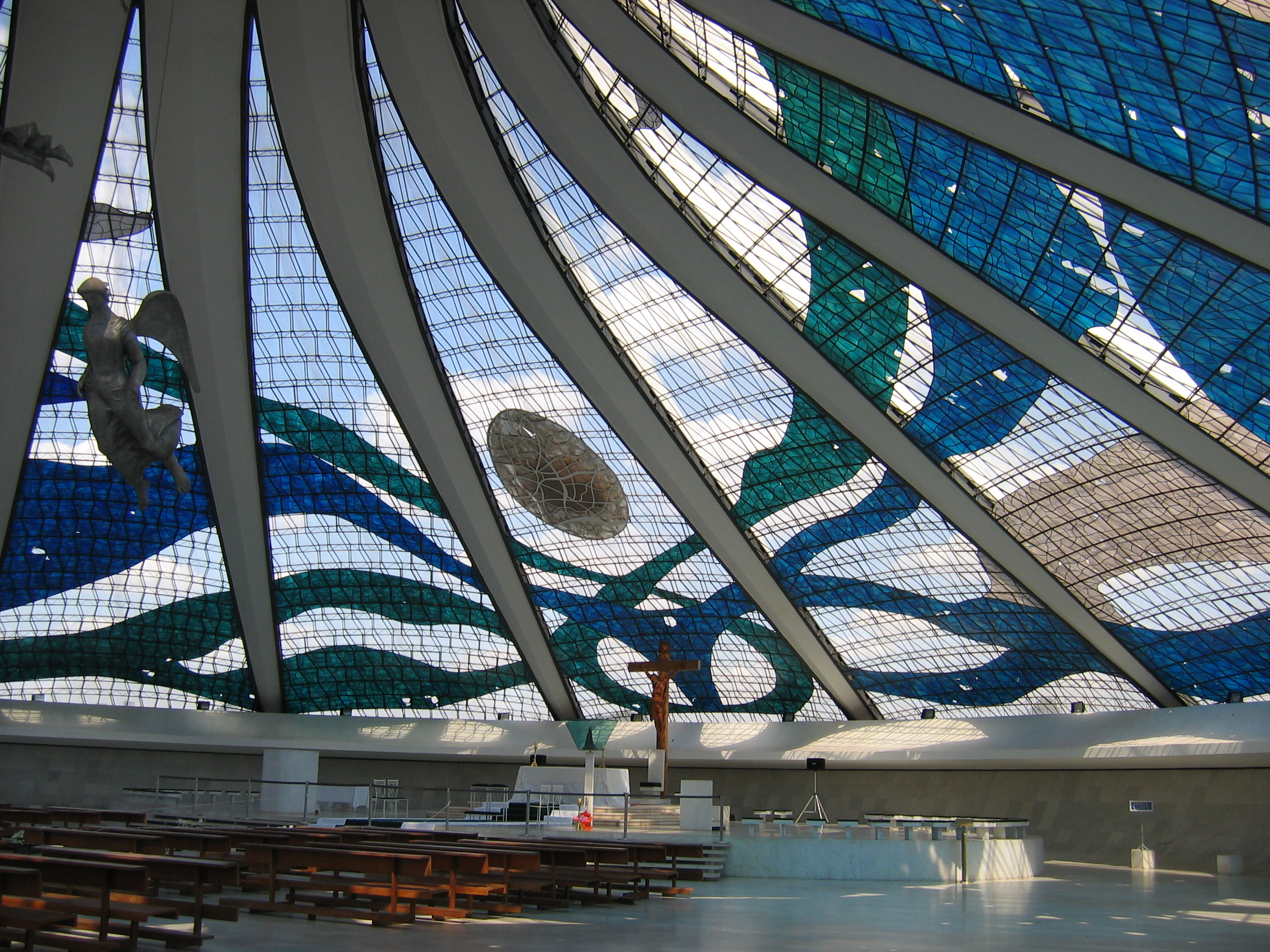
Stained glasses at the Cathedral of Brasília interior

In Brazil, Peretti met architect Oscar Niemeyer. Since then, her works have been part of several Niemeyer buildings, such as the stained glass at the Cathedral of Brasília.

== Death ==
Peretti died on 25 April 2022, at the Real Hospital Português in Recife. The cause of death was not given. Five days later, she was buried at Cemitério Campo da Esperança, in Asa Sul, Brasília.
