= 2022–2023 Brazilian coup plot =

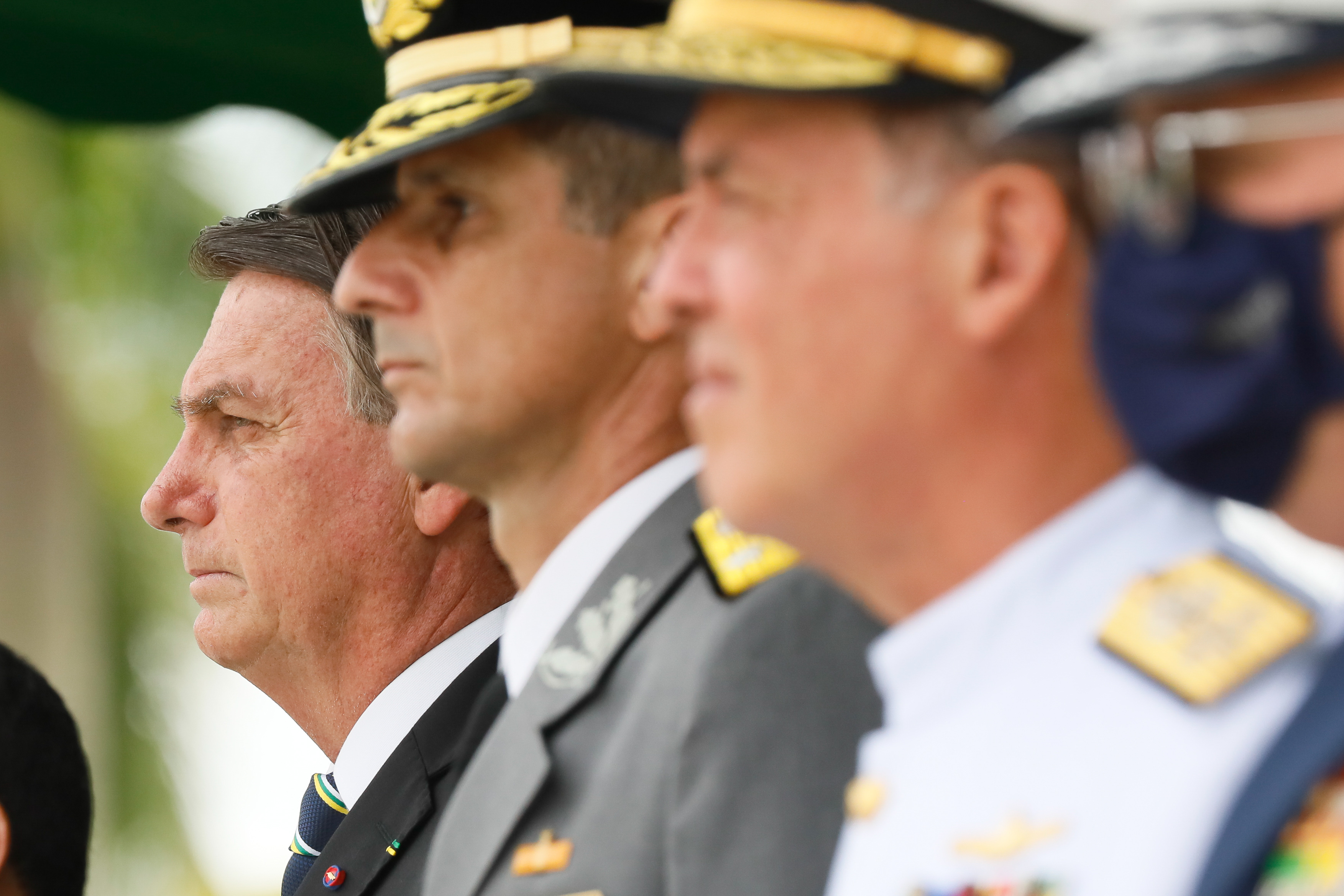
- Jair Bolsonaro and military authorities in December 2020
- Date: 30 October 2022 – 8 January 2023
- Location: Brazil
- Caused by: False allegations of electoral fraud in the 2022 Brazilian general election promoted by former President Jair Bolsonaro and his allies; Denial of the 2022 presidential election results; Far-right extremism in Brazil
- Goals: Pressure military and government officials to instigate a coup d'état against President Luiz Inácio Lula da Silva's government; Keep Bolsonaro in power; Reinstate Jair Bolsonaro as President of Brazil after the end of his term
- Result: Coup attempt failed: 8 January Brasília attacks; Detainment en masse of rioters by law enforcement; Jair Bolsonaro and his running mate Walter Braga Netto are declared ineligible following an Electoral Court ruling on 30 June 2023; Bolsonaro and his close allies are sentenced by the Supreme Court on 11 September 2025 for their role in a coup plot against then president-elect Luiz Inácio Lula da Silva

Lead figures
Jair Bolsonaro; Walter Braga Netto; Anderson Torres; Augusto Heleno	Lula da Silva; Geraldo Alckmin; Alexandre de Moraes; Flávio Dino

Casualties
- Charged: 34 criminally charged (31 faced trial and 29 were convicted)

During and after the 2022 Brazilian general election, a network of members of former president Jair Bolsonaro's government and of the Brazilian Armed Forces allegedly planned to subvert the transition of power to newly elected president Luiz Inácio Lula da Silva, arrest Supreme Federal Court (STF) justice Alexandre de Moraes and Federal Senate president Rodrigo Pacheco, and shut down several government institutions, such as the National Congress, the Superior Electoral Court and the STF, in an attempt to keep Bolsonaro in power and consolidate his control over the federal government. The plans, evidence, and individuals involved in planning a coup d'état were gradually revealed in investigations conducted by public agencies and the press in 2023 and 2024.

After the 8 January Brasília attacks, more than 1,400 people were charged for their alleged role in the riots. Valdemar Costa Neto, head of the Liberal Party, and three aides to Bolsonaro were arrested on 8 February 2024. On 21 November 2024, the Federal Police formally accused Bolsonaro and 36 people of an attempt to overthrow Brazil's democratic institutions, including a plot to assassinate Lula, Vice President-elect Geraldo Alckmin and Supreme Court Justice Moraes. On 14 December 2024, Bolsonaro's 2022 running mate and former Chief of Staff, General Walter Braga Netto, was arrested. On 18 February 2025, Prosecutor General Paulo Gonet formally indicted Bolsonaro and 34 others for an attempted coup d'état. On 26 March, the Supreme Court accepted the Prosecutor General's complaint and considered Bolsonaro and seven other allies as defendants in the case.

The trial of the leadership group took place between 2 and 11 September 2025 before the First Panel of the Supreme Federal Court and resulted in the conviction of all the defendants, with Jair Bolsonaro being sentenced to 27 years and 3 months in prison. Overall, 31 of the 34 individuals indicted by the Prosecutor General became defendants and stood trial. Of these, 29 individuals were convicted.

Beginning in July 2025, the Trump administration in the United States began openly clashing with Brazilian authorities, claiming Bolsonaro was the victim of a witch hunt without presenting solid grounds. As a result, the US imposed a 50% tariff on all Brazilian imports, revoked the visas of eight Brazilian Supreme Court justices, and applied the Magnitsky Act against Moraes. In response, Brazil's president Lula published an article in The New York Times saying that he wants to "establish an open and frank dialogue with the president of the United States", but stated that "Brazilian democracy and sovereignty are non-negotiable". Following subsequent diplomatic contacts between Lula and Trump, tensions gradually eased toward the end of 2025, with the Trump administration lifting the additional tariffs and revoking the sanctions against Moraes. On 16 June 2026, the Supreme Court sentenced Eduardo Bolsonaro to 4 years and 2 months in prison for coercion in judicial proceedings after finding that he had lobbied the Trump administration to impose sanctions aimed at influencing the trial of his father, Jair Bolsonaro.

== Context ==
=== Civilian–military relations in Brazil ===
The relationship between the Armed Forces and politics in Brazil has been a significant aspect of the country's history. Since the proclamation of the Republic in 1889, the military has played an important role in political affairs, including direct intervention during the military dictatorship from 1964 to 1985. Even after the democratic transition, the Armed Forces have continued to exert influence in national debates, often presenting themselves as guarantors of stability and order.

In the 21st century, the military's role in politics resurfaced with greater intensity during the presidency of Jair Bolsonaro (2019–2022), a former army captain who appointed a large number of active and retired military officers to government positions. This development renewed discussions about the politicization of the Armed Forces and their place within Brazil's democratic framework. Tensions peaked during the 2021 military crisis, when the commanders of the Army, Navy, and Air Force collectively resigned following the dismissal of the Minister of Defense.

=== Fake news and attempts to discredit the electoral system ===
Fake news was an element with special prominence in the elections in Brazil in 2014, 2018 and 2022, and was used by various actors with the objective of convincing and manipulating the electors and their votes. Although fake news is not a new phenomenon, widespread access to digital communication tools and the ease with which messages were massively spread gave false information, in 2022, a leading role in electoral debates and were the focus of containment actions by courts, legislators and media companies.

=== 2022–2023 Brazilian election protests ===
Protests relating to the 2022 Brazilian general election transpired in the lead-up to it, and dramatically increased shortly after the conclusion of its second round on 30 October, in which Luiz Inácio Lula da Silva was elected president. The protestors held mass protests and roadblocks nationwide. Supporters of Jair Bolsonaro, alleging election fraud, began blocking roads and highways in the country. At least 23 Brazilian states, plus the Federal District, recorded roadblocks as of 1 November, adding up to at least 267 roadblocks according to data from Federal Highway Police (PRF).

The protesters have in common the rejection of the election result, allegation of frauds and call for a coup or a federal or military intervention to reassess the elections results and even to prevent the president inauguration, which affronts the Brazilian Constitution. These blockades have been widely criticized by entities, politicians, and authorities due to the fact that they have caused disruptions to the food supply, paralysis of the supply of products such as fuel and medicines, impediment of the citizen's right to transit, cancellation of flights, crashes, and deaths. They have also been called attacks against democracy, as they contest the electoral process and its legitimacy. The protests have since been characterized as domestic terrorism by part of the Brazilian media.

On 8 January 2023, pro-Bolsonaro demonstrators stormed the Praça dos Três Poderes, assaulting the Chamber of Deputies and the Federal Senate halls of the National Congress of Brazil, the Supreme Federal Court palace and the Palácio do Planalto in an attempt to overthrow the Federal Government. The insurrection failed and the Praça was cleared by law enforcement after a few hours; several thousand Bolsonaro supporters were arrested following the event.

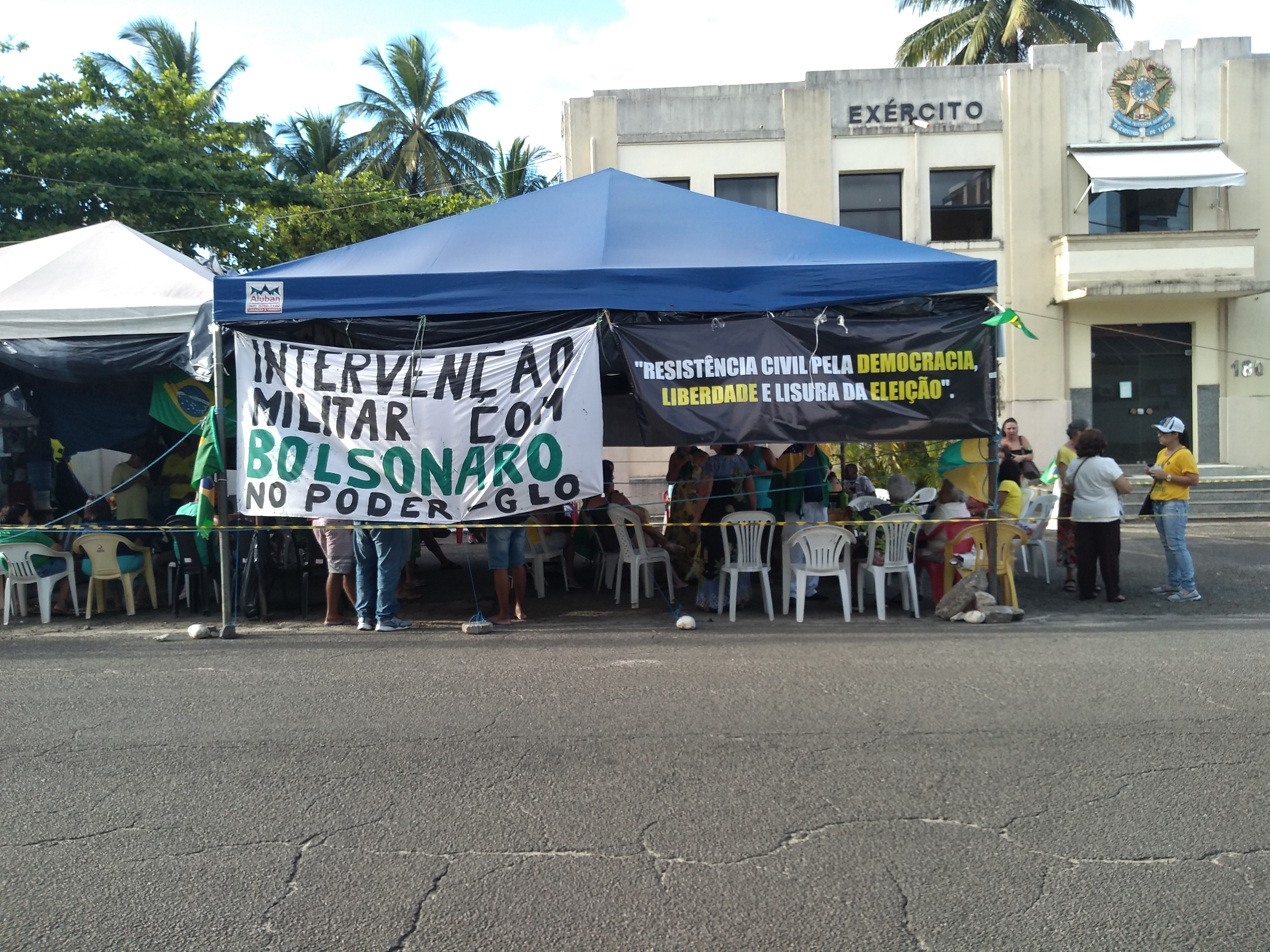
Protest in front of the Brazilian Army barracks in Ilhéus, Bahia

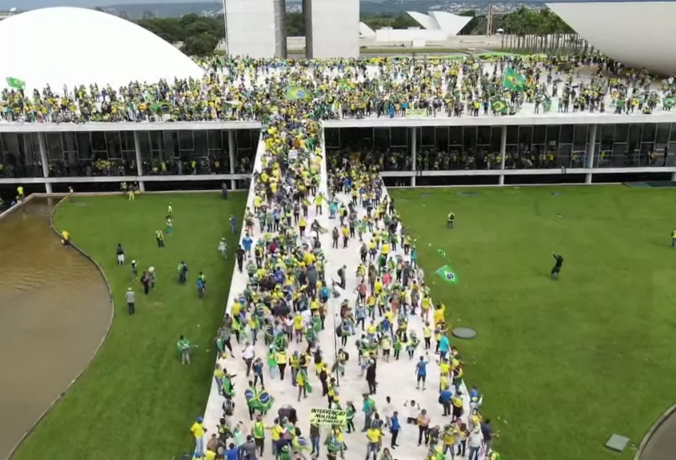
Protesters storming the National Congress of Brazil during the 8 January Brasília attacks

== Investigation ==
=== "Coup draft" ===
On 12 January 2023, the Federal Police found a draft announcement of a coup in a search of former justice minister Anderson Torres's home. The document outlined a plan to implement a state of defense (estado de defesa) (Note: The "state of defense" (estado de defesa) is defined in Article 136 of the Brazilian Constitution and aims to "preserve or promptly re-establish, in restricted and determined places, public order or social peace threatened by serious and imminent institutional instability or affected by major natural disasters".) that would annul the 2022 election results. It also leveled a series of accusations, such as abuse of power and lack of impartiality, (Note: Impartiality: that is, "suspeição", a situation provided for in Brazilian law in which a judge has a "subjective relationship" with any of the parties (i.e. friendship, grievances, debt etc.), and thus must abstain from taking part in the trial. The law also provides for cases of "impedimento": when a judge has an "objective relationship" with any of the parties (i.e. kinship). (see TJDFT)) against the Superior Electoral Court (TSE), which had been investigating Bolsonaro and his allies while he was in office.

==== Anderson Torres's testimony ====
Upon his return to Brazil, Anderson Torres was arrested and detained for four months while Supreme Court justice Alexandre de Moraes investigated his role in the riots. (Note: Brazil has a civil law legal system under which judges play an important role in criminal investigations. Brazilian constitution determines that if the accused holds a position in the executive or legislative branches at the time of the accusation, or held one at the time of allegedly committing the acts alleged by the accusation, the court responsible for the trial is the Supreme Federal Court, and not a common court.)

In his testimony to the Federal Police on 2 February 2023, Torres sought to dismiss the coup draft found in his residence as a document "without legal viability", disposable, according to him. He also stated that it was not he who had placed the draft decree in a folder on his shelf, and that he believed his domestic worker had done so while house cleaning. Torres reaffirmed that he had not drafted the document and did not know who did.

To the accusation of negligence or complicity with the 2022–2023 Brazilian election protests that culminated in the attack on Congress on 8 January, Torres, who took office on 2 January as head of security for the Federal District, claimed he had fulfilled all necessary verification and security measures, relying on reports that did not foresee radical actions by Bolsonaro supporters. Since he thought he had fulfilled his duties, he said, he deemed it appropriate to proceed with a planned family trip to the United States, where he stayed in Orlando, the same city as Bolsonaro, with whom he said he had not met nor coordinated his plans.

Ricardo Cappelli, the intervenor Lula put in charge of Brasília's public security after the riots, called 8 January "a structured sabotage operation" adding: "Torres took over as secretary for security (in Brasília), dismissed the whole chain of command and then took a trip. If that's not sabotage, I don't know what is."

===== Anderson Torres's cellphone =====
Regarding the whereabouts of his phone, Torres claimed to have turned it off after his arrest was ordered, due to the number of calls he received, and lost it shortly afterward. He said he did not know where it was but he said he had not left it in the United States. Torres offered to provide the password to his cloud storage account.

==== Marcos do Val's account ====
On 15 June 2023, the Federal Police, authorized by Supreme Court justice Alexandre de Moraes, searched residences linked to Senator Marcos do Val, who was investigated for obstructing investigations of the 8 January coup attempt in Brasília. The senator's Twitter account was also blocked.

O Globo had access to the federal police report, revealing that do Val had boasted in a number of WhatsApp groups that he had the fate of two presidents of the republic in his hands: "I have a bomb in hand to destroy Bolsonaro and another one to destroy Lula." He also said he was responsible for Bolsonaro taking refuge in the United States after he lost the 2022 election: "I was invited by him [Bolsonaro] to do this. As member of CCAI [Mixed Intelligence Activities Control Commission], I started to wind it up to see how far it would go. When it was about to happen, I informed him that he would be committing a very serious crime against democracy and, from there, I reported it to the responsible authority. It was because of this that he fled to the USA."

Do Val returned to the Senate on 3 August 2023.

==== Ailton Gomes's audio recordings ====
Audio recordings from 15 December 2022, of former major and Liberal Party (PL) candidate, Ailton Gomes, record instructions to then-Army Commander Freire Gomes to do "(...) o que tem que fazer" (what needs to be done), setting the deadline for the following day for him to make a statement in support of the coup; otherwise, it added, the statement would come from Jair Bolsonaro.

==== Bolsonaro's coup meetings ====
In a statement proferred as part of a plea deal approved by Justice Alexandre de Moraes, Mauro Cid stated that Jair Bolsonaro met with the commanders of the Armed Forces' three branches to assess the possibility of carrying out a coup, whose draft declaration had been prepared by his advisors, with the purpose of preventing the change of government. The draft was allegedly delivered by Filipe Martins, advisor for international affairs. Its content anticipated the arrest of political opponents and justice Alexandre de Moraes.

The plan was allegedly accepted by the commander of the Brazilian Navy, Admiral Almir Garnier Santos. However, General Marco Antônio Freire Gomes of the Brazilian Army reportedly refused to participate, leading to abandonment. Bolsonaro's defense team has said that the statements are slanderous.

In addition to the military, Cid would have said that Bolsonaro received, in meetings at the presidential palace, various people with coup plans that involved, among other things, using a misinterpretation of article 142 of the Federal Constitution to entrust the armed forces with exercising the moderating power. Warned about the risks, the then-president would have assumed the sad expression that marked his first public appearance after the end of the elections.

==== Reactions ====
The discovery of the draft caused widespread repercussions in Brazilian politics, society, and judiciary. Jurists debated the inherent illegality of possessing of such a document, regardless of its use or the success of its use. Senator Randolfe Rodrigues called for an inquiry by the Supreme Federal Court into the "attempted coup d'état".

During the media uproar that occurred after the draft's discovery, Torres said on social media that the draft was "most likely" a document that was meant to be discarded and shredded by the Ministry of Justice and Public Security. According to him, the draft was taken without his knowledge and used out of context, fueling "false narratives" against him. Conversely, his lawyers said that the draft had been handed to him by a "citizen", though some of the material in the document indicates that it was prepared by someone familiar with the case.

Jair Bolsonaro's defense team moved to exclude the document from a parallel investigation of his attempt to discredit the electoral system. This investigation arose from a speech against the Superior Electoral Court, delivered at a meeting with ambassadors in 2022. The request was denied, and the document remained part of the evidence.

On 30 June 2023, a majority at the Superior Electoral Court declared Jair Bolsonaro ineligible to hold political power until 2030 for his abuse and misuse of communication media during this meeting.

==== Investigation ====
The Federal Police conducted several forensic examinations and investigations regarding the document to trace its circulation among government authorities, among other purposes. According to information gathered by investigators, the draft reached Bolsonaro's aides, as well as members of his reelection committee. An analysis of the various fingerprints found on the document was carried out by the Federal Police. Efforts were made to trace the printer that originated the document via documentology, mainly aiming to verify whether the draft originated from a public agency. The forensic technique in use is only effective for tracing medium or large sized printers, and is less accurate for consumer printers.

=== 8 January Parliamentary Inquiry Committee ===
On 26 April 2023, the Chamber of Deputies and the Federal Senate jointly established a Parliamentary Inquiry Committee to investigate the 8 January attacks. The investigation concluded on 18 October 2023, following the approval of Senator Eliziane Gama’s report by a 20–11 vote, which formally charged 61 individuals, including former president Jair Bolsonaro.

=== Operation Tempus Veritatis ===
On 8 February 2024, the Federal Police executed thirty-three search and seizure warrants and four preventive detention warrants in Operation Tempus Veritatis ("time of truth", in Latin). Former special advisor to Bolsonaro, Filipe G. Martins, retired colonel Marcelo Câmara, and major Rafael Martins were arrested. The targets of the search and seizure measures included the president of the Liberal Party, Valdemar Costa Neto, generals Braga Netto, Augusto Heleno, and Paulo Sérgio Nogueira, Admiral Almir Garnier Santos, former minister Anderson Torres, and Bolsonaro himself, who had his passport seized.

The following day, on 9 February 2024, a video from a meeting held on 5 July 2022 involving Bolsonaro and constituent ministers was released. President Bolsonaro was recorded instructing ministers on the need to act before the elections to avoid a possible "guerrilla" war in Brazil. The video, found on Mauro Cid's computer, was released by journalist Bela Megale, of the newspaper O Globo. Bolsonaro allegedly ordered the dissemination of fraudulent information to try to reverse the situation in the electoral dispute, alleging supposed electoral frauds that were never proven. The meeting also involved other ministers, including the serving minister of defense, who reportedly stated that the Superior Electoral Court (TSE) was an "enemy" of the Bolsonarist group. The recording is part of an investigation into an attempted coup involving military personnel and former ministers.

During the same meeting, the minister of the Institutional Security Bureau (GSI), General Augusto Heleno, expressed the intention to infiltrate agents from the Brazilian Intelligence Agency (Abin) into both Bolsonaro's and Lula da Silva's electoral campaigns. Heleno mentioned the importance of acting before the elections as to avoid possible upheavals, using terms such as "turning the table" and highlighting the need for decisive action before the ballot. President Bolsonaro interrupted Heleno to express concern about leaks and suggested that such matters be discussed in a private meeting.

=== Operation Counter-coup ===
On 19 November 2024, the Federal Police launched Operation Counter-coup, investigating a plan called "Green and Yellow Dagger", drawn up in 2022 to prevent the inauguration of president-elect Lula da Silva and vice president-elect Alckmin. The plan included the murder of Lula, Alckmin and Supreme Court Justice Moraes. Five suspects were arrested, including four Army special forces soldiers – known as "black kids" – and a federal police officer. Notable among the military arrests was the reserve general Mario Fernandes, a former member of the Bolsonaro government and parliamentary adviser to Eduardo Pazuello. The operation also involved searches and seizures, suspension of public functions of those involved and other precautionary measures.

==== Green and Yellow Dagger plan ====
The investigation found that the plan relied on detailed military tactics, such as clandestine monitoring and illicit use of public resources. According to the investigation, the "Green and Yellow Dagger" plan – which foresaw the assassination of Lula, Alckmin, and Moraes – began to be elaborated on 12 November 2022, at Braga Netto's home, at the time the defeated vice-presidential candidate on the ticket headed by Jair Bolsonaro. Evidence was recovered from the electronic devices of Colonel Mauro Cid, Jair Bolsonaro's former aide-de-camp. The operation was part of a larger investigation into anti-democratic acts linked to the 2022 elections and the 8 January 2023 attacks, including violations of the rule of law and embezzlement of public assets.

==== Operation 142 ====
Operation 142 was an action plan devised between November and December 2022 to halt the presidential transition process, prevent Lula da Silva from taking office, annul the 2022 elections and decisions of the Supreme Court (STF), prepare a new vote, extend Bolsonaro's mandate, and replace all members of the Supreme Court. The Federal Police found the operation's planning document at the headquarters of the Liberal Party (PL), on the desk of Colonel Flávio Botelho Peregrino, who was then an aide to Braga Netto. The name of the coup plan refers to the thesis of constitutional military intervention, which misinterprets Article 142 of the 1988 Brazilian Constitution as granting a "moderating power" to the Armed Forces.

==== Formal accusation by the Federal Police ====
On 21 November 2024, the Federal Police formally accused Bolsonaro and 36 people for an attempt to overthrow Brazil's democratic institutions, which included planning and ordering the assassination of President-elect Lula, Vice-president-elect Geraldo Alckmin and Supreme Court Justice Alexandre de Moraes in 2022 to keep Bolsonaro in power after the legal end of his term. Most of the accused are top ranking Brazilian military officers who were appointed to government positions during Bolsonaro's presidency. The report submitted to the Court by the police stated that Bolsonaro had "full knowledge" about an assassination plot against Lula. That same day, Lula acknowledged that he was thankful that an attempt to "poison" him failed.

==== Arrest of Braga Netto ====
On 14 December 2024, retired army general Walter Braga Netto, who was also Jair Bolsonario's running mate in the 2022 Brazilian presidential election, was arrested and held in Rio de Janeiro after being accused of hindering an investigation, as well as having a role, in the 2022 coup attempt. Leading up to his arrest, searches were carried out at Braga Netto's residence in Rio de Janeiro and also the home of retired colonel Flavio Botelho Peregrino in Brasília.

== Pro-Bolsonaro demonstrations ==
Pro-Bolsonaro demonstrations on Paulista Avenue in 25 February 2024
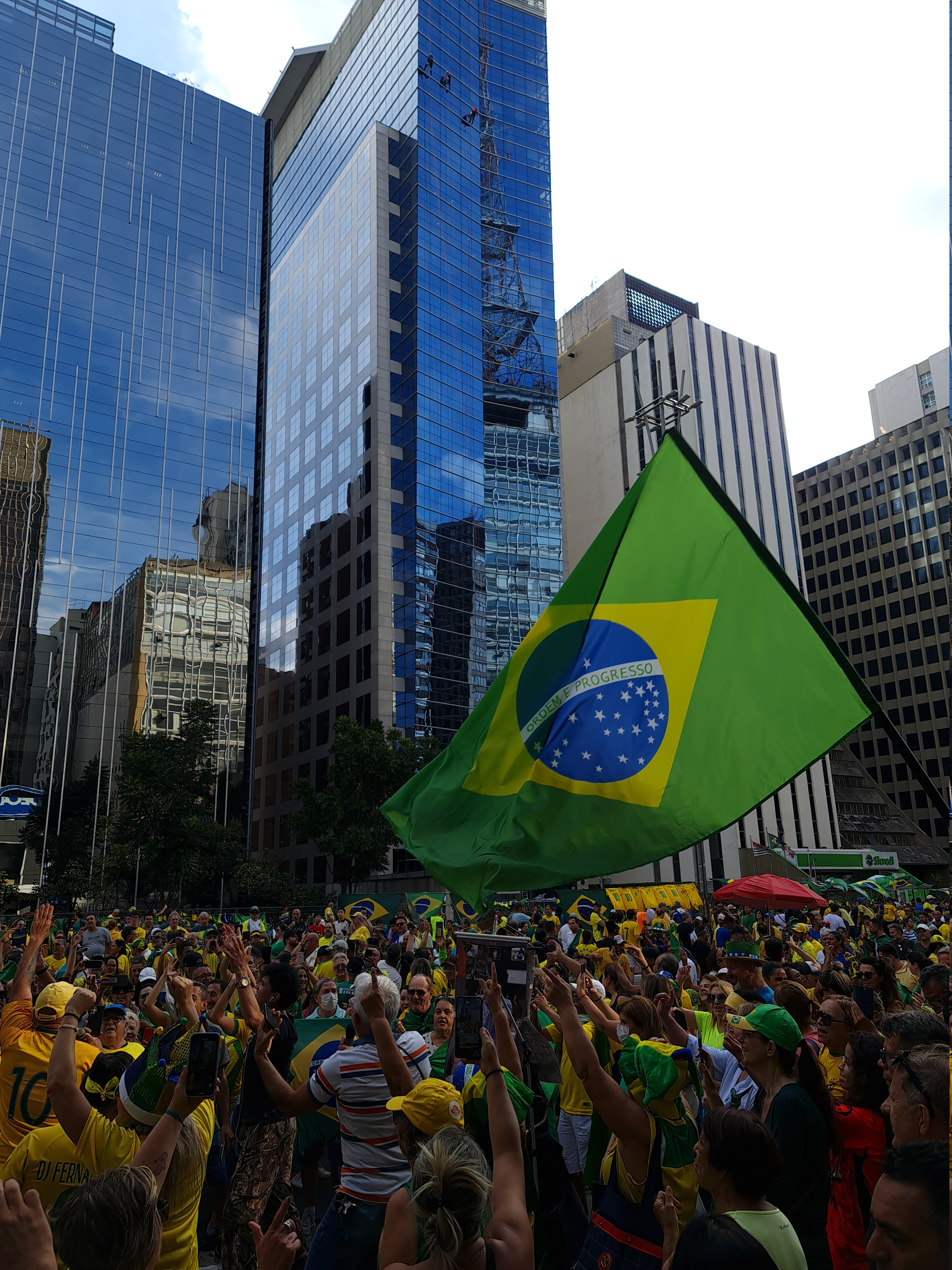
- Date: 25 February 2024
- Location: Paulista Avenue, São Paulo, Brazil
- Cause: Federal Police of Brazil investigation on alleged coup plot involving former president Jair Bolsonaro and the high military command
- Participants: About 100,000 people, according to the PM

Pro-Bolsonaro demonstrations took place on Paulista Avenue on 25 February 2024, convened by former President Jair Bolsonaro, weeks after the Federal Police launched Operation Tempus Veritatis as part of investigations into an alleged coup plot involving the former mandatary and high-ranking military officials. The declared objective of the event was to defend "the Democratic Rule of Law and Freedom" and counter the accusations against Bolsonaro.

The act was attended by about 2,000 military police, two electric trios, flags of Brazil and Israel, and political and religious leaders combined with Bolsonaro, such as the governor of São Paulo, Tarcísio de Freitas (Republicans), the mayor of Campo Grande, Adriane Lopes (Patriota), the mayor of São Paulo, Ricardo Nunes (MDB), Pastor Silas Malafaia, and the Senators Magno Malta (PL-ES) and Rogério Marinho (PL). The demonstration was opened by former first lady Michelle Bolsonaro, who said a prayer and said a few words of support to her husband.

The speeches of the speakers were marked by compliments to Bolsonaro, criticism of former President Lula and the left, and defense of national sovereignty, the traditional family, and Christian values. Bolsonaro was the last to speak and spoke for about 40 minutes, with no time limit. He reaffirmed his innocence in the investigations, accused STF Minister Alexandre de Moraes of political persecution, and said he would not accept "fraud" in the 2024 elections, which he will compete for PL.

The demonstration was broadcast live by various media and social networks of Bolsonaro and his supporters. According to PM estimates, the act gathered about 100,000 people on Paulista Avenue, but there was no record of incidents or clashes with groups contrary to the former president. The demonstration was considered a Bolsonaro political force test, which seeks to recover his popularity and his electoral base after leaving office in January 2023, under pressure from protests, complaints, and court proceedings.

== People involved ==
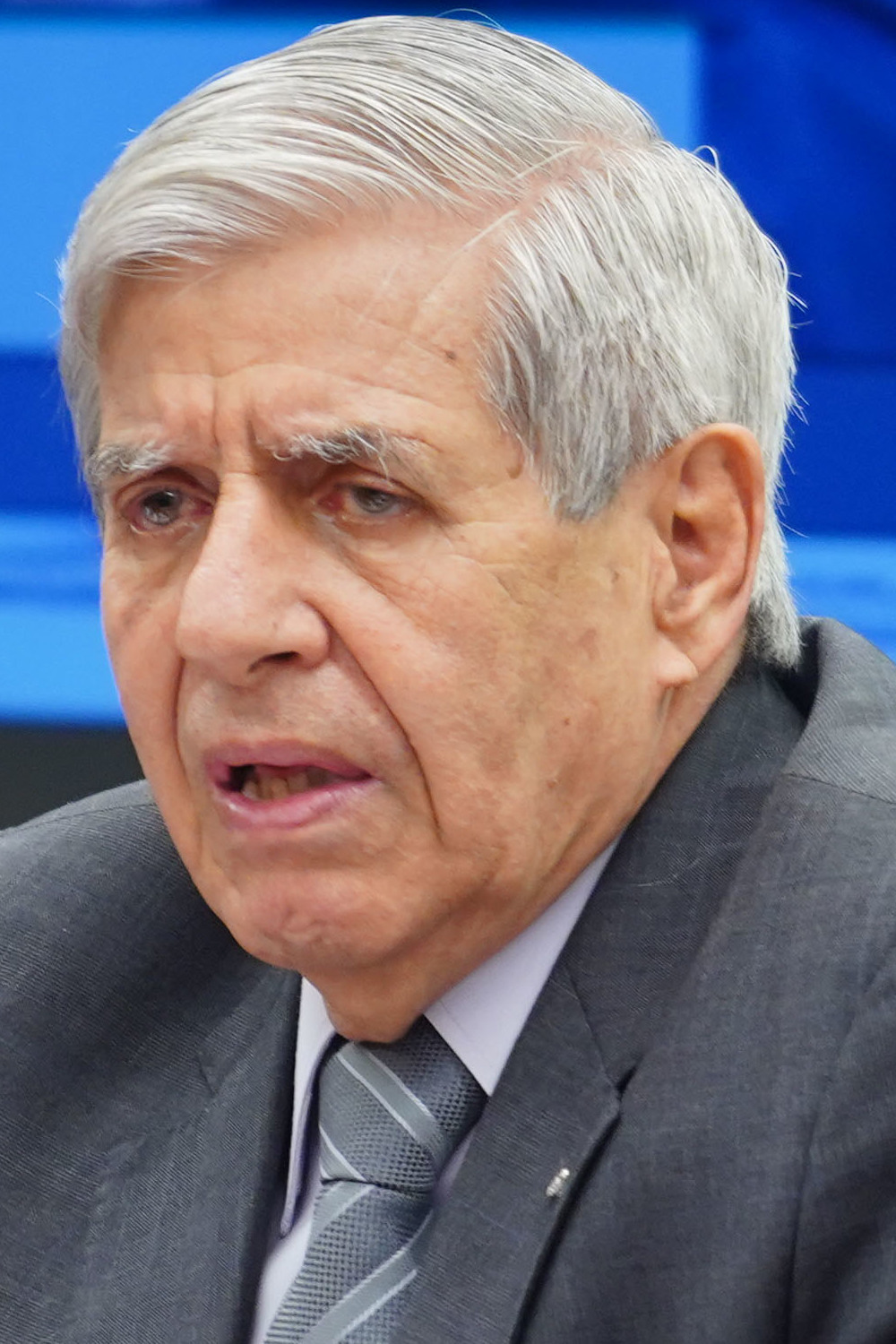
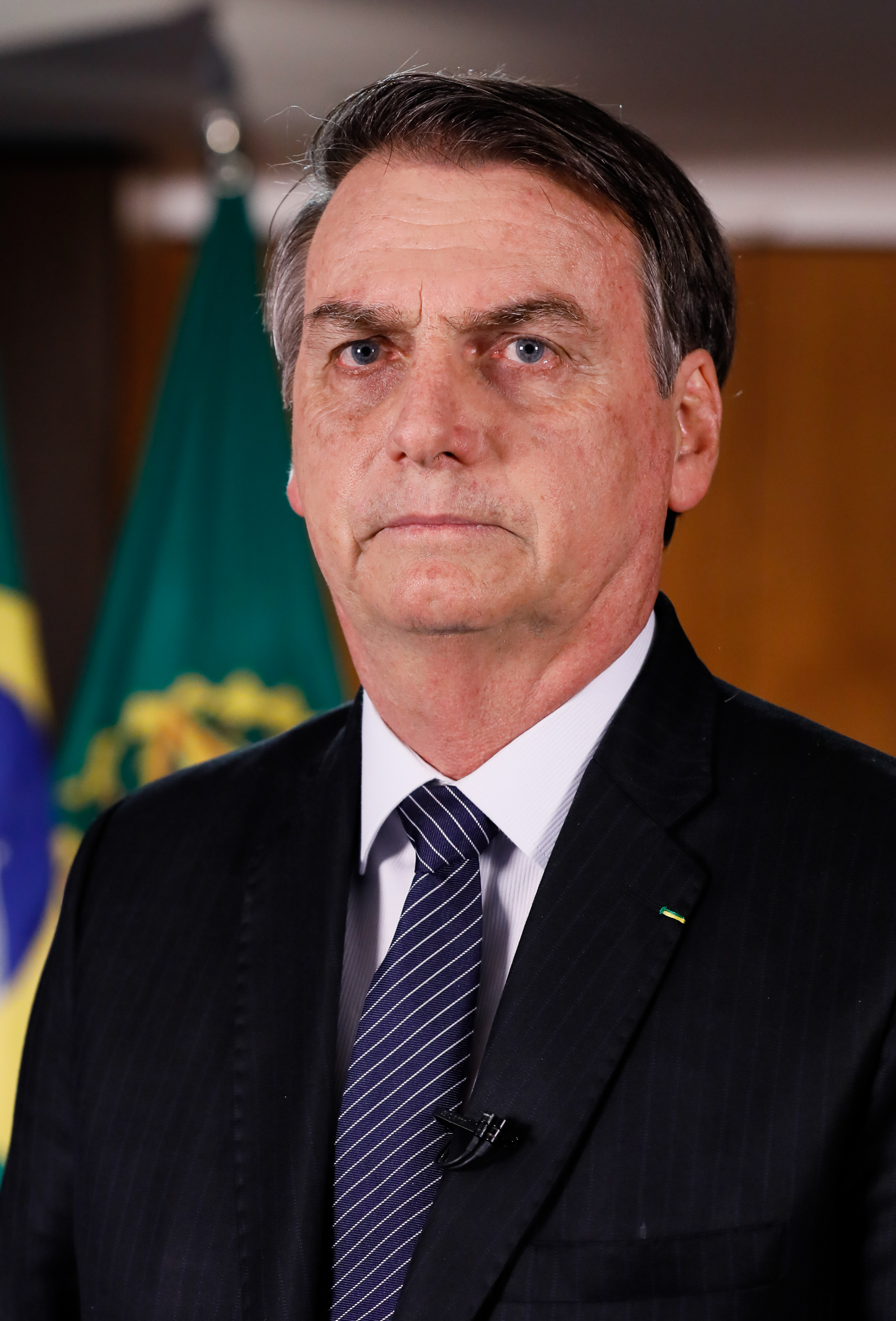
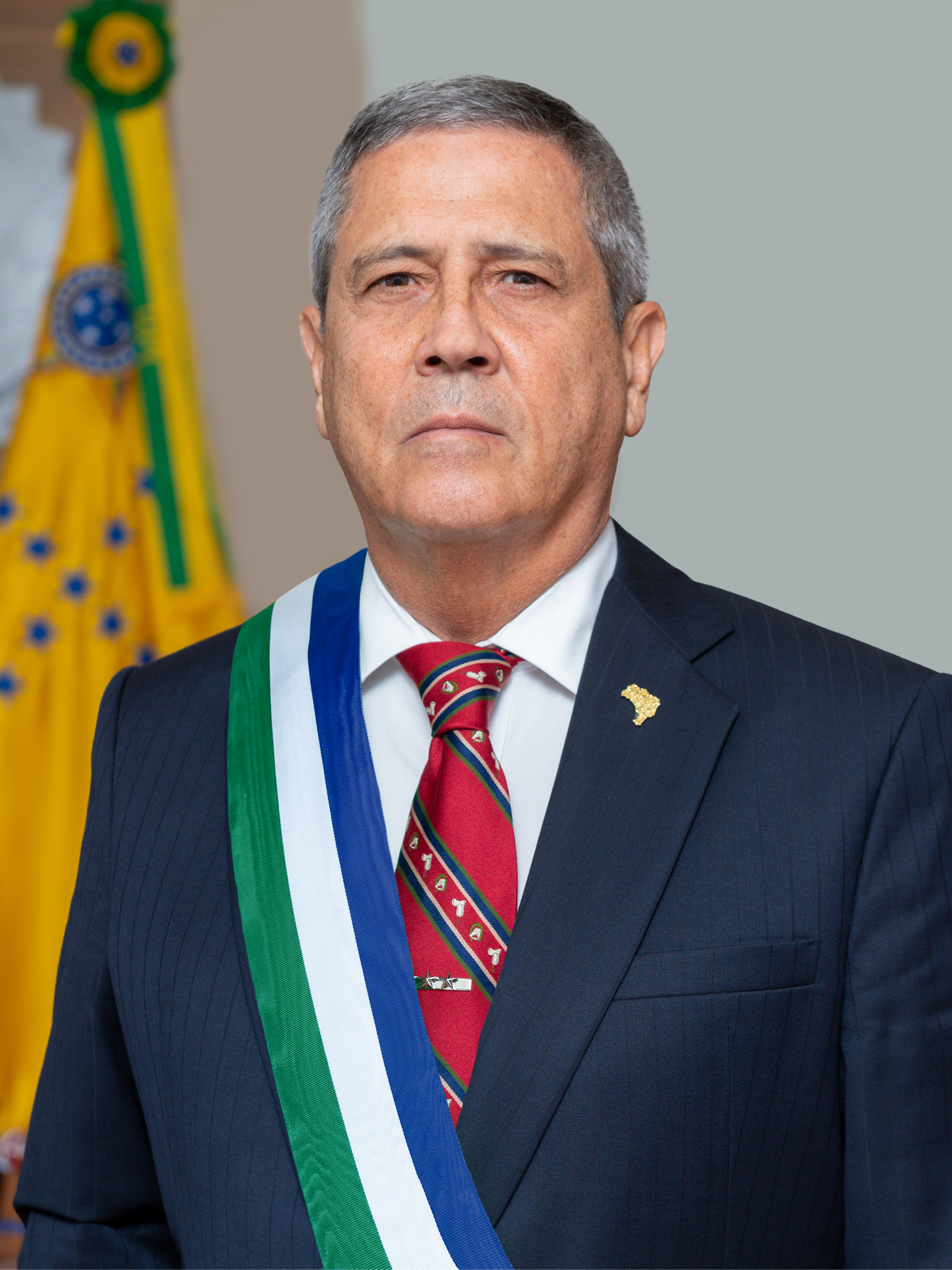
Augusto Heleno (left), Jair Bolsonaro (center) and Walter Braga Netto (right) are among the main figures involved in coup d'état attempt.

The Federal Police and the Prosecutor General identified four organizational groups in the coup plot.

=== Group 1: Leadership and Command ===
- Jair Bolsonaro, former President of the Republic
- General Walter Braga Netto, former Minister of Defense and former Chief of Staff
- Anderson Torres, former Minister of Justice
- Admiral Almir Garnier, former Commander of the Navy
- General Augusto Heleno, former Chief Minister of the Institutional Security Office (GSI)
- General Paulo Sérgio Nogueira, former Minister of Defense
- Alexandre Ramagem, former Head of the Brazilian Intelligence Agency (Abin)
- Lieutenant Colonel Mauro Cid, former aide-de-camp to Bolsonaro

=== Group 2: Management of Operation Actions ===
- General Mário Fernandes, former Deputy Secretary of the Presidential Chief of Staff's Office
- Silvinei Vasques, former Director-General of the Federal Highway Police
- Filipe Garcia Martins Pereira, former Special Advisor for International Affairs to Bolsonaro
- Fernando de Sousa Oliveira, former Executive Secretary of the Public Security Secretariat of the Federal District
- Colonel Marcelo Costa Câmara, former advisor to Jair Bolsonaro
- Marília Ferreira de Alencar, former Director of Intelligence at the Ministry of Justice

=== Group 3: Execution of Actions ===
- General Estevam Theófilo Gaspar de Oliveira
- Lieutenant Colonel Hélio Ferreira Lima
- Lieutenant Colonel Rafael Martins de Oliveira
- Lieutenant Colonel Rodrigo Bezerra de Azevedo
- Colonel Bernardo Romão Corrêa Netto
- Colonel Fabrício Moreira de Bastos
- Colonel Marcio Nunes de Resende Júnior
- Lieutenant Colonel Sérgio Cavaliere de Medeiros
- Lieutenant Colonel Ronald Ferreira de Araújo Júnior
- Wladimir Matos Soares, Federal Police agent

=== Group 4: Production and Dissemination of Disinformation ===
- Former Major Ailton Gonçalves Moraes Barros
- Major Angelo Martins Denicoli
- Carlos César Moretzsohn Rocha, president of the Instituto Voto Legal
- Sub-lieutenant Giancarlo Gomes Rodrigues
- Lieutenant Colonel Guilherme Marques Almeida
- Marcelo Araújo Bormevet, Federal Police agent
- Colonel Reginaldo Vieira de Abreu.

== Trial ==
=== Summary table ===
Defendants	Criminal charges					Sentence	Loss of military rank (Note: The Superior Military Court must decide on the loss of rank of all the convicted military officers with a prison sentence exceeding 2 years. The trial is expected to take place in the first half of 2027.)
Defendants	Abolition of the democratic rule of law	Coup d'état	Criminal organization	Qualified damage	Deterioration of protected heritage property	Sentence	Loss of military rank
Jair Bolsonaro	Guilty; 4–1	Guilty; 4–1	Guilty; 4–1	Guilty; 4–1	Guilty; 4–1	27 years, 3 months (Note: Under arrest since 4 August 2025: 4 August – 25 November 2025: Provisional detention; Since 25 November 2025: Serving the sentence; Place of Imprisonment: 4 August – 22 November 2025: House arrest; 22 November 2025 – 15 January 2026: Federal Police Regional Headquarter (Brasília, DF); 15 January – 27 March 2026: 19th Military Police Battalion (Brasília, DF); Since 27 March 2026: House arrest) (Note: Since being arrested, Jair Bolsonaro has been hospitalized several times. Notably, he was admitted on the following occasions: 25 December 2025 – 1 January 2026: Surgery to correct a bilateral inguinal hernia; 13 – 27 March 2026: ICU hospitalization for bacterial bronchopneumonia (after which he was granted 90 days of temporary house arrest, which was later extended); 1 – 4 May 2026: Arthroscopic surgery on the right shoulder for rotator cuff repair; Since 20 November 2026: ICU hospitalization for acute intestinal obstruction)	TBD
Walter Braga Netto	Guilty; 5–0	Guilty; 4–1	Guilty; 4–1	Guilty; 4–1	Guilty; 4–1	26 years (Note: Under arrest since 14 December 2024: 14 December 2024 – 25 November 2025: Provisional detention; Since 25 November 2025: Serving the sentence; Place of Imprisonment: Since 14 December 2024: 1st Army Division (Rio de Janeiro, RJ))	TBD
Anderson Torres	Guilty; 4–1	Guilty; 4–1	Guilty; 4–1	Guilty; 4–1	Guilty; 4–1	24 years (Note: Under arrest: 14 January – 11 May 2023: Provisional detention; Since 25 November 2025: Serving the sentence; Place of Imprisonment: 14 January – 11 May 2023 and since 15 November 2025: 19th Military Police Battalion (Brasília, DF))	—N/a
Almir Garnier	Guilty; 4–1	Guilty; 4–1	Guilty; 4–1	Guilty; 4–1	Guilty; 4–1	24 years (Note: Under arrest since 25 November 2025: Serving the sentence; Place of Imprisonment: Since 25 November 2025: Navy Radio Station (Brasília, DF))	TBD
Augusto Heleno	Guilty; 4–1	Guilty; 4–1	Guilty; 4–1	Guilty; 4–1	Guilty; 4–1	21 years (Note: Under arrest since 25 November 2025: Serving the sentence; Place of Imprisonment: 25 November – 22 December 2025: Planalto Military Command (Brasília, DF); Since 22 December 2025: House arrest) (Note: On 22 December 2025, Augusto Heleno was granted humanitarian house arrest after a Federal Police medical report confirmed a diagnosis of Alzheimer’s disease.)	TBD
Paulo Sérgio Nogueira	Guilty; 4–1	Guilty; 4–1	Guilty; 4–1	Guilty; 4–1	Guilty; 4–1	19 years (Note: Under arrest since 25 November 2025: Serving the sentence; Place of Imprisonment: Since 25 November 2025: Planalto Military Command (Brasília, DF))	TBD
Alexandre Ramagem	Guilty; 4–1	Guilty; 4–1	Guilty; 4–1	charges temporarily suspended (Note: The Supreme Court ordered the partial suspension of the criminal case against Alexandre Ramagem only with regard to those two crimes allegedly committed after his inauguration as a congressman. These charges will be brought to trial after the end of his term.)		16 years, 1 month (Note: Arrest warrant issued on 21 November 2025: Alexandre Ramagem fled to the United States shortly after his conviction; Under arrest between 13 – 15 April 2026: Alexandre Ramagem was arrested by ICE in the United States)	—N/a
Mauro Cid	Guilty; 5–0	Guilty; 4–1	Guilty; 4–1	Guilty; 4–1	Guilty; 4–1	2 years (Note: Serving the sentence in open regime since 30 October 2025)	—N/a

=== Criminal Trial before the Supreme Federal Court ===
The trial of Group 1 took place between 2–11 September 2025 before the First Panel of the Supreme Federal Court. The charges submitted to trial were:

- Attempted violent abolition of the democratic rule of law (Article 359-L of the Penal Code)
- Attempted coup d'état (Article 359-M of the Penal Code)
- Participation in an armed criminal organization (Article 2 of Law No. 12,850/2013)
- Qualified damage (Article 163 of the Penal Code)
- Deterioration of protected heritage property (Article 62 of Law No. 9,605/1998)

The justices presiding over the case voted in the following order:

- Alexandre de Moraes (rapporteur)
- Flávio Dino
- Luiz Fux
- Cármen Lúcia
- Cristiano Zanin (president of the First Panel)

Justices Alexandre de Moraes, Flávio Dino, Cármen Lúcia and Cristiano Zanin voted for the conviction of Jair Bolsonaro and all the other defendants on every charge brought against them, with Dino voting for lighter sentences for Paulo Sérgio Nogueira, Augusto Heleno, and Alexandre Ramagem, on the grounds that they had a lesser degree of involvement in the scheme. Moraes also highlighted the importance of Jair Bolsonaro as the leader of the criminal organization, as well as its cohesion, hierarchy, division of tasks, and unity of purpose.

Justice Luiz Fux, in a vote that lasted more than 13 hours, decided to uphold some preliminary objections raised by the defense, such as the Supreme Court's lack of jurisdiction over the case, the First Panel's lack of jurisdiction vis-à-vis the Full Bench, and the violation of the right to defense due to the practice of document-dumping. On this basis, he argued for the annulment of the case. Nevertheless, he voted to uphold the validity of Mauro Cid's plea bargain. He also advocated for suspending the proceedings on all charges against Alexandre Ramagem until the end of his term as congressman. He further held that the crime of Coup d'État automatically absorbs the crime of violent abolition of the democratic rule of law, with the merits to be assessed only in relation to the former. As for the merits, he voted only to convict Mauro Cid and Braga Netto for attempted violent abolition of the democratic rule of law and to acquit all the other defendants on all charges.

In the sentence, the justices took into account the degree of participation of each convicted defendant in each crime, as well as mitigating and aggravating circumstances. Owing to his plea bargain agreement, the justices decided to apply the minimum sanction of two years in an open regime to Mauro Cid. By contrast, due to his leadership role in the criminal organization, Jair Bolsonaro was sentenced to 27 years and 3 months in prison. The justices also declared all the defendants ineligible to run for office for eight years after serving their sentences according to Ficha Limpa (Clean Record Act) and decided to revoke Alexandre Ramagem's congressional mandate, as well as Ramagem and Torres position of delegate in the Federal Police (both are licensed Federal Police officers) according to the rule expressed in the Brazilian constitution. Finally, they sent an official notice to the Superior Military Court so that it may decide on the loss of rank of all the convicted military officers with a prison sentence exceeding 2 years.

On 7 November, the First Panel unanimously (Note: Justice Luiz Fux requested to be transferred to the Second Panel after Justice Luís Roberto Barroso's retirement and, for that reason, did not take part in the analysis of the appeals.) rejected the first appeals filed by the defendants’ defense teams. On 25 November, Moraes ruled that the second set of appeals filed by the defense was not admissible, declared the case to have reached res judicata and ordered the beginning of the enforcement of the prison sentence for all the defendants in Group 1.

The trials of the other three groups took place before the First Panel over the course of late 2025. The trial of Group 4 was held between 14 and 21 October and resulted in the conviction of all defendants. The trial of Group 3 took place between 11 and 18 November and led to the conviction of 9 of the 10 defendants, with only General Estevan Theophilo being acquitted. Finally, the trial of Group 2 was held between 9–16 December and resulted in the conviction of 5 of the 6 defendants, with only Fernando de Sousa Oliveira being acquitted. Overall, 31 of the 34 individuals indicted by the Prosecutor General became defendants and stood trial. Of these, 29 individuals across the four groups were convicted.

=== Honor Trial before the Superior Military Court ===
On 3 February 2026, the Prosecutor General of Military Justice, Clauro Roberto de Bortolli, formally requested the Superior Military Court to strip the ranks and expel from the Armed Forces Captain Jair Bolsonaro, Generals Walter Braga Netto, Augusto Heleno and Paulo Sérgio Nogueira, and Admiral Almir Garnier. If convicted, in addition to the loss of rank, the expelled military officers would also forfeit their pensions, as well as the privilege of being detained in military facilities. A different reporting justice was randomly assigned to each of the defendants. This will be the first time in history that the Court tries members of the military for crimes against democracy, as well as the first time that general officers will be tried. The trial is expected to take place in the second half of 2026.

The court is composed of 15 justices — including 4 Army generals, 3 Navy admirals, 3 Air Force brigadier generals, and 5 civilians — all appointed by the President of the Republic and approved by the Senate. The court’s presiding justice, the civilian Maria Elizabeth Rocha, votes only in the event of a tie and is required to cast her vote in favor of the defendant. The justices appointed as reporting judge and reviewing judge for each case are as follows:

Case of Captain Jair Bolsonaro:

- Reporting Justice: Carlos Aquino (Air Force – appointed by Temer, 2018)
- Reviewing Justice: Verônica Sterman (Civilian – appointed by Lula, 2025)

Case of General Braga Netto:

- Reporting Justice: Flávio Marcus Lancia (Army – appointed by Lula, 2025)
- Reviewing Justice: Arthur Vidigal (Civilian – appointed by Dilma, 2010)

Case of Admiral Almir Garnier:

- Reporting Justice: Verônica Sterman (Civilian – appointed by Lula, 2025)
- Reviewing Justice: Guido Amin (Army – appointed by Lula, 2025)

Case of General Augusto Heleno:

- Reporting Justice: Celso Luiz Nazareth (Navy – appointed by Bolsonaro, 2020)
- Reviewing Justice: Aurélio Lima de Queiroz (Civilian – appointed by Dilma, 2016)

Case of General Paulo Sérgio Nogueira:

- Reporting Justice: Barroso Filho (Civilian – appointed by Dilma, 2014)
- Reviewing Justice: Flávio Marcus Lancia (Army – appointed by Lula, 2025)

On 5 March 2026, Jair Bolsonaro's defense requested the disqualification of Justice Francisco Joseli Parente. According to the former president's attorneys, Parente had previously expressed support for punishing military personnel involved in the 8 January riots and was therefore biased in ruling on the possible revocation of Bolsonaro's military rank. On 24 June, the Court unanimously rejected the motion and upheld Parente's eligibility to participate in the trial.

=== Criminal Review efforts ===
On 8 May 2026, former President Jair Bolsonaro's defense filed a criminal review petition before the Supreme Federal Court challenging his conviction. A criminal review is a legal action that may be filed by the defense at any time after the conviction has become final and unappealable, with the purpose of annulling the conviction, changing the legal classification of the offenses, or reducing the sentence. The action may only be admitted when the conviction is contrary to the express wording of criminal law or to the evidence in the case file; when it is based on testimony, examinations, or documents proven to be false; or when, after the conviction, new evidence of the convicted person's innocence is discovered.

Bolsonaro’s defense argues that the case should have been tried by the Court’s full bench rather than by the First Panel, and that the plea bargain agreement of Lieutenant Colonel Mauro Cid is null and void because it was entered into involuntarily, functioning as a “mechanism to implicate the former president.” Another argument is that there was “late, massive, and functionally ineffective access” to evidence, which allegedly compromised the exercise of adversarial proceedings and the right to a full defense. In addition, the defense argues that acts that were allegedly “mere acts of contemplation and, at most, preparation” were criminalized, and that there would not even be “indications” that Bolsonaro had knowledge of the facts for which he was convicted.

On 12 May 2026, Justice Kassio Nunes Marques was randomly selected as the rapporteur of the case. The Court’s Internal Rules provide that, when a criminal review stems from a decision issued by one of the Panels, the rapporteur must be selected from among the justices of the other Panel. Regardless of the rapporteur’s decision, the review must ultimately be judged by the Court’s full bench, composed of all the justices. If the review is ultimately granted, the defendant may be acquitted, or the Court may alter the classification of the offense, modify the sentence, or annul the proceedings. Under no circumstances, however, may the sentence be increased.

On 16 June 2026, Prosecutor General Paulo Gonet formally recommended that Justice Nunes Marques reject Jair Bolsonaro's petition for criminal review. Gonet argued that Bolsonaro's conviction was supported by a "robust body of evidence" and that the petition amounted to nothing more than an expression of "dissatisfaction" with the Court's ruling.

On 25 September 2026, former President Jair Bolsonaro's defense team filed a new petition for criminal review and withdrew its earlier petition. In the new filing, Bolsonaro's lawyers reiterate their arguments for annulling the trial and add "new facts" based on what they consider new positions taken by the Court and the Prosecutor General's Office in the Banco Master scandal case. According to the defense, the arguments presented at the 15 September 2026 session, which began considering a request to open an investigation into Justice Alexandre de Moraes over his ties to Daniel Vorcaro, "proved to be in absolute contradiction with what was decided in the criminal case that convicted President Bolsonaro." His defense team also requested an injunction for his provisional release from prison while the petition is pending. On 1 October 2026, Justice Nunes Marques was assigned as rapporteur of the new petition because he was already overseeing the previous one. On 12 November 2026, Prosecutor General Paulo Gonet told the Supreme Federal Court he also opposes Jair Bolsonaro’s second request for criminal review. He argued that the defense had shown no grounds to overturn the conviction or any harm suffered during the coup plot trial, and that the verdict rested on ample evidence.

== Amnesty efforts ==
Following the convictions of thousands of people in connection with the 8 January 2023 attacks, Bolsonaro supporters and allies began to promote the idea of a broad amnesty. These efforts intensified after the former president himself was convicted in connection with the coup plot. Supporters framed the measure as a form of "national reconciliation" while critics denounced it as an attempt to erase accountability for an attempted coup.

Several potential candidates in the 2026 elections — including former First Lady Michelle Bolsonaro and the governors Tarcísio de Freitas, Romeu Zema, Ronaldo Caiado, and Ratinho Júnior — publicly urged Congress to approve the amnesty. Tarcísio also said that, if elected, he would sign a pardon for Jair Bolsonaro on his first day in office. Caiado claimed Bolsonaro's trial had been "anticipated" by the court and described amnesty as essential for pacification. Zema likewise accused the Supreme Court of persecuting right-wing figures and suggested that granting amnesty would restore political balance, drawing comparisons with previous pardons in Brazil's history.

The Supreme Court signalled that such a measure would be unconstitutional, stressing that the 1988 Constitution forbids amnesty or pardon for crimes committed by armed groups against the democratic order and citing precedents where similar pardons were struck down.

=== Legislative history ===
After Bolsonaro's conviction, his allies began drafting an alternative amnesty proposal that would not be struck down by the Supreme Court and would be accepted by the Senate, where resistance to the measure is stronger. Several alternatives were under discussion, including the possibility of reducing the carceral sentences of those convicted. On 17 September 2025, the Chamber of Deputies approved, by 311 votes to 163, the fast-track procedure for the amnesty bill. On 18 September, the President of the Chamber of Deputies Hugo Motta chose Congressman Paulinho da Força as the rapporteur for the bill in the House.

On 9 December, after months of political deadlock, rapporteur Paulinho da Força presented his report, which does not pardon the penalties but reduces the sentences of those convicted in the coup plot and the 8 January rioters. Just past midnight on 10 December, the Chamber of Deputies approved the bill by 291 votes to 148. The bill establishes that the crimes of Attempted Coup d’État and Attempted Abolition of the Democratic Rule of Law shall be considered in formal concurrence, meaning that only the most severe penalty will apply, increased by one-sixth to one-half. The bill also reduces the sentence-progression requirement from one-quarter to one-sixth of the prison term for moving from a closed regime to a semi-open regime. Finally, the bill provides that these crimes, when committed in a "crowd context," shall have their penalties reduced by one-third to two-thirds, ensuring that this reduction applies only to the 8 January rioters and not to their leaders and financiers.

On 17 December, the bill was approved by the Federal Senate by 48 votes to 25. The Senate made minor changes to the text to ensure that the changes to the calculation of sentence progression do not apply to crimes outside the context of the coup plot and the 8 January events. If signed into law, the bill could reduce Bolsonaro's sentence from 27 to about 21 years, and his time in a closed-regime prison from 7 to approximately 3 years. On 8 January 2026, President Lula officially vetoed the sentence-reduction bill.

On 30 April 2026, Congress partially overrode President Lula’s veto by 49–24 votes in the Senate and 318–144 votes in the Chamber of Deputies. The override was partial because Senate President Davi Alcolumbre removed from consideration the portion of the bill concerning the new regime progression thresholds, arguing that it conflicted with the recently approved anti-organized crime law, which imposed harsher penalties for such offenses. As enacted, the law now unifies the penalties for those convicted of attempted coup d’état and attempted violent abolition of the democratic rule of law, by applying the higher penalty increased by one sixth to one half. It also provides for reducing the sentence-progression requirement for those convicted of these two crimes from one quarter to one sixth of the prison term for transfer from a closed to a semi-open regime. The reduction in sentences is not automatic, and the Supreme Court will have to recalculate the sentences of all convicted individuals on a case-by-case basis under the new legislation.

=== Supreme Court rulings ===
On 9 May 2026, Justice Alexandre de Moraes suspended the immediate enforcement of the Sentence-Reduction Act until the Supreme Court rules on the constitutionality of the legislation. Moraes granted a request from a constitutional challenge filed by the PSOL–Rede Federation. On 18 June, Prosecutor-General Paulo Gonet formally presented his opinion to the Supreme Court in defense of the constitutionality of the Sentence-Reduction Act, urging the Court to reject the requests seeking to suspend the law. Gonet argued that the Legislative Branch has constitutional autonomy and a "margin of discretion" to define the country's criminal policy and sentencing criteria.

== Timeline ==
=== Military leaders under Bolsonaro ===
Minister of Defense	Commander of the Army	Commander of the Navy	Commander of the Air Force
Fernando Azevedo e Silva (2019–2021)	Edson Pujol (2019–2021)	Ilques Barbosa (2019–2021)	Antonio Carlos Moretti Bermudez (2019–2021)
Walter Braga Netto (2021–2022)	Paulo Sérgio Nogueira (2021–2022)	Almir Garnier Santos (2021–2022)	Carlos de Almeida Baptista Júnior (2021–2022)
Paulo Sérgio Nogueira (Apr – Dec 2022)	Marco Antônio Freire Gomes (Apr – Dec 2022)	Almir Garnier Santos (2021–2022)	Carlos de Almeida Baptista Júnior (2021–2022)

Color key

Commanders who resigned during the military crisis in 2021.
Commanders who agreed to the coup attempt in 2022.
Commanders who resisted the coup attempt in 2022.

=== Detentions and custodial status ===
Timeline of detentions and custodial status of defendants from Group 1 Pre-trial detention Pre-trial house arrest House arrest Imprisonment after conviction Fugitive Serving in open regime

== Reactions ==
Harvard political scientist Steven Levitsky assessed the trial of former president Jair Bolsonaro as a milestone of institutional resilience in Brazil, arguing that by holding an authoritarian leader accountable, the country demonstrates a degree of democratic maturity surpassing that of the United States in some respects.

The Economist likewise emphasized the solidity of Brazil's judiciary in the face of external pressures, viewing Washington's application of the Magnitsky Act as excessive and noting that, in contrast to authoritarian trends in other democracies, Brazil offers an example of institutions committed to operating within the rules and upholding the rule of law. At the same time, the magazine portrayed Justice Alexandre de Moraes as "the judge who would rule the internet", recognizing his central role in curbing far-right online speech but cautioning that judicial overreach could erode public trust in Brazil's democracy.

The Washington Post similarly framed Bolsonaro's trial as unprecedented in Brazilian history, noting that for the first time a former president had been brought to justice for an attempted coup and underscoring the judiciary's role in confronting such threats despite diplomatic frictions with the United States.

== See also ==
- Operation Lesa Pátria
- Operation Counter-coup
- 2021 Brazilian military crisis
- List of coups and coup attempts by country
- 1937 Brazilian coup d'état
- 1945 Brazilian coup d'état
- 1964 Brazilian coup d'état

== Notes ==
Notes
