= Truck patriot =

2022 Internet meme in Brazil

Truck patriot or truck Bolsonarista (Portuguese: patriota do caminhão) is a 2022 Internet meme featuring a supporter of Brazilian president Jair Bolsonaro hanging from the windshield of a moving truck. Following the 2022 Brazilian election, protestor Junior Cesar Peixoto climbed onto the windshield of a truck to prevent it from passing the protests on the BR-232 highway. However, the truck driver did not stop and continued for several kilometers with the protester hanging on.

Recordings of the incident went viral on social media, with memes depicting the truck patriot at tourist spots around the world. The truck patriot became a political symbol of ridicule against Bolsonarism. Peixoto did not like the response and deleted his profiles from social networks.

== Origin ==
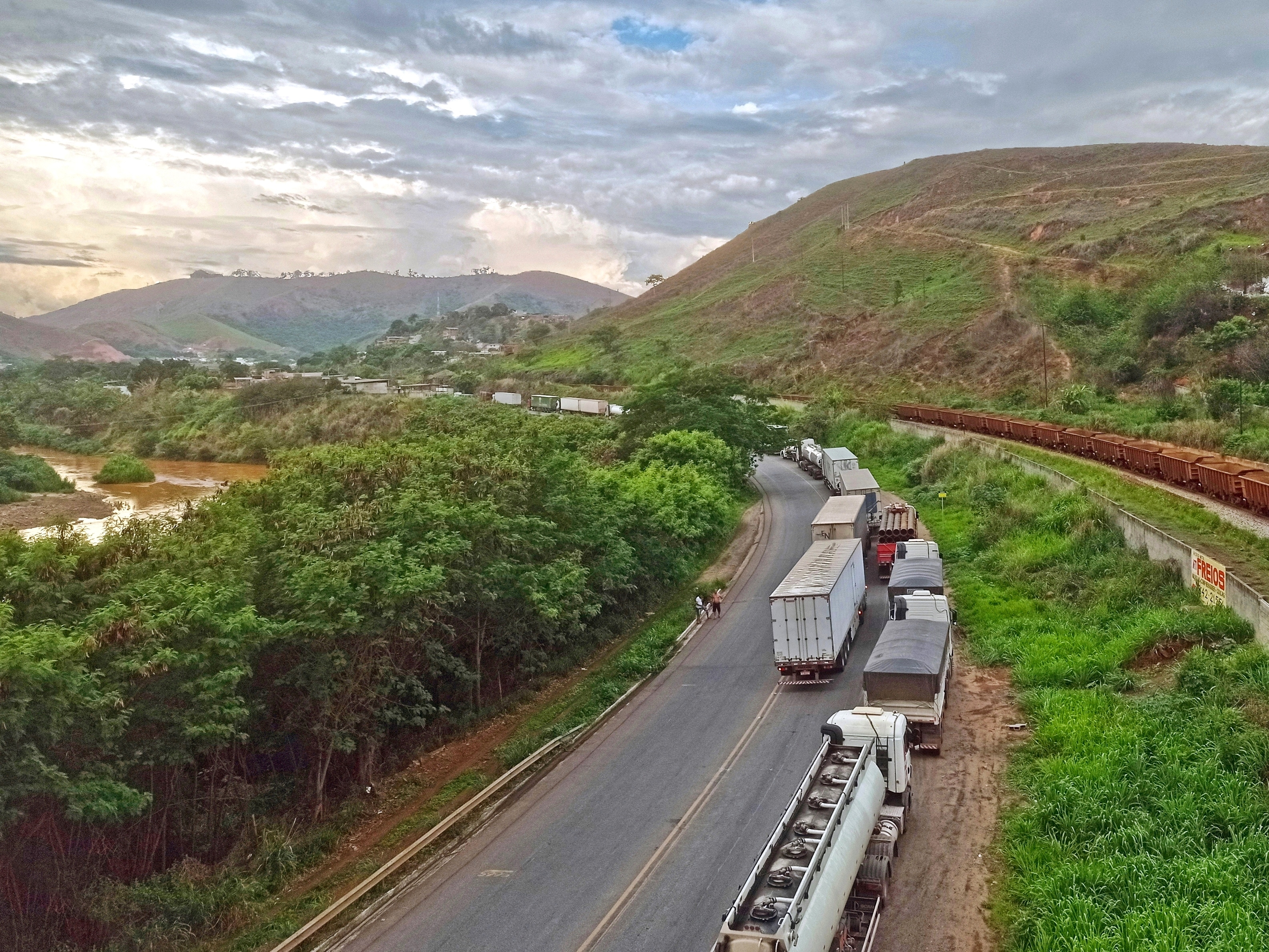
A back up trucks is seen on BR-381 when supporters of Jair Bolsonaro blocked highways to protest his loss in the 2022 Brazilian presidential election.

On October 30, 2022, Luiz Inácio Lula da Silva was elected president of Brazil, defeating incumbent, Jair Bolsonaro. In response, Bolsonaro supporters blocked highways and roads across the country and called for a coup d'état in a movement known as the 2022–2023 Brazilian election protests.

On a section of the BR-232 highway near the city of Caruaru, a local protester named Junior Cesar Peixoto climbed onto a truck's windshield to prevent the vehicle from passing the protesters' blockade. The driver, however, did not stop and Peixoto remained hanging for several kilometers.

== Spread and impact ==
The case quickly became an internet meme and was shared on social networks such as Facebook, Instagram and Twitter. Social media users added soundtracks to the videos and made numerous montages with the truck at tourist spots around the world and scenes from movies. The meme's popularity was noted in various Brazilian newspapers such as Estado de Minas, Folha de S.Paulo, G1, and Metrópoles, and was featured in an illustration by cartoonist Genildo Ronchi.

Peixoto did not like the reaction, stating that he felt "very exposed" on social media, where he demonstrated support for Bolsonaro. As a result of the meme, he deleted his social media profiles.

Folha de S.Paulo columnist Tony Goes wrote that the truck patriot epitomized the protests' shameful nature, writing "in the absence of humorous programs on open TV, we laugh at the clowns of real life". The incident was described as entertaining, and an aesthetic representation of the failed coup.

Traffic infractions were committed by those involved. Traffic law expert Alex Monteiro stated that the driver could be fined for endangering the life of the pedestrian who was on a public road, according to article 170 of the Brazilian Traffic Code and article 132 of the Penal Code, and the Bolsonaro supporter could be punished for obstructing traffic without authorization from the authority responsible for the road.
