= Operation Counter-coup =

Investigation of 2022 Brazil coup plot

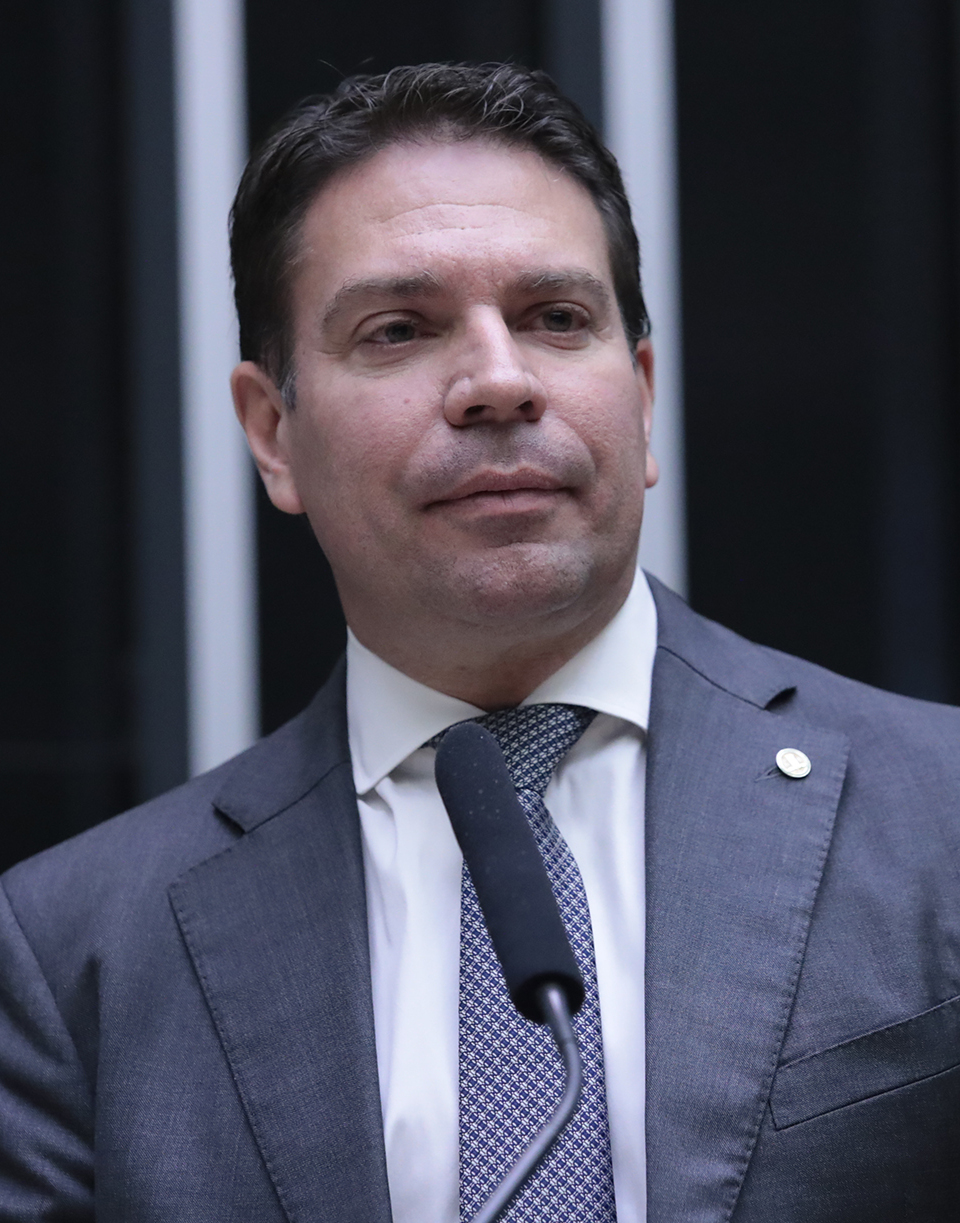
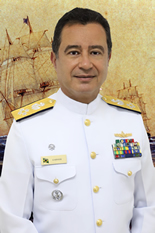
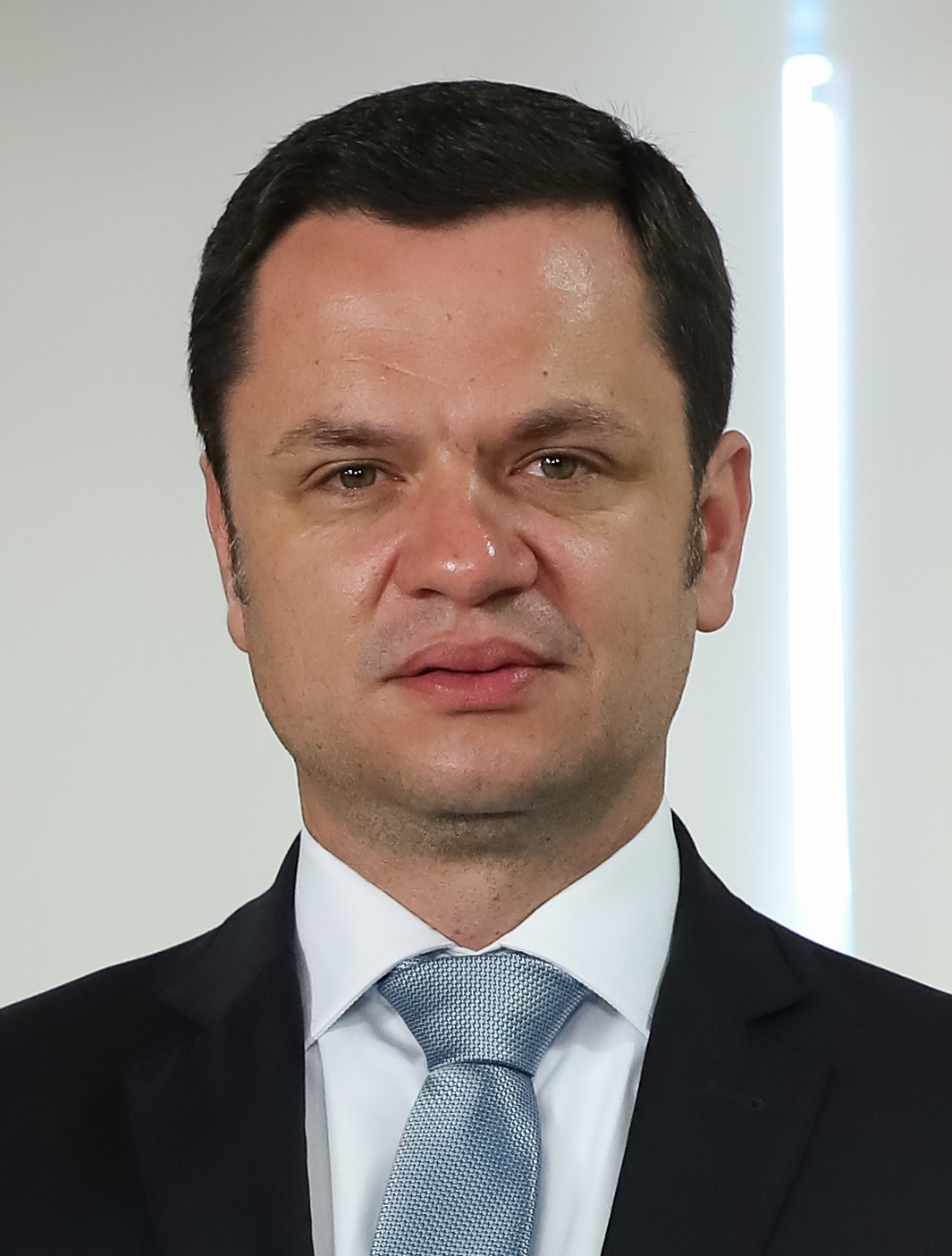
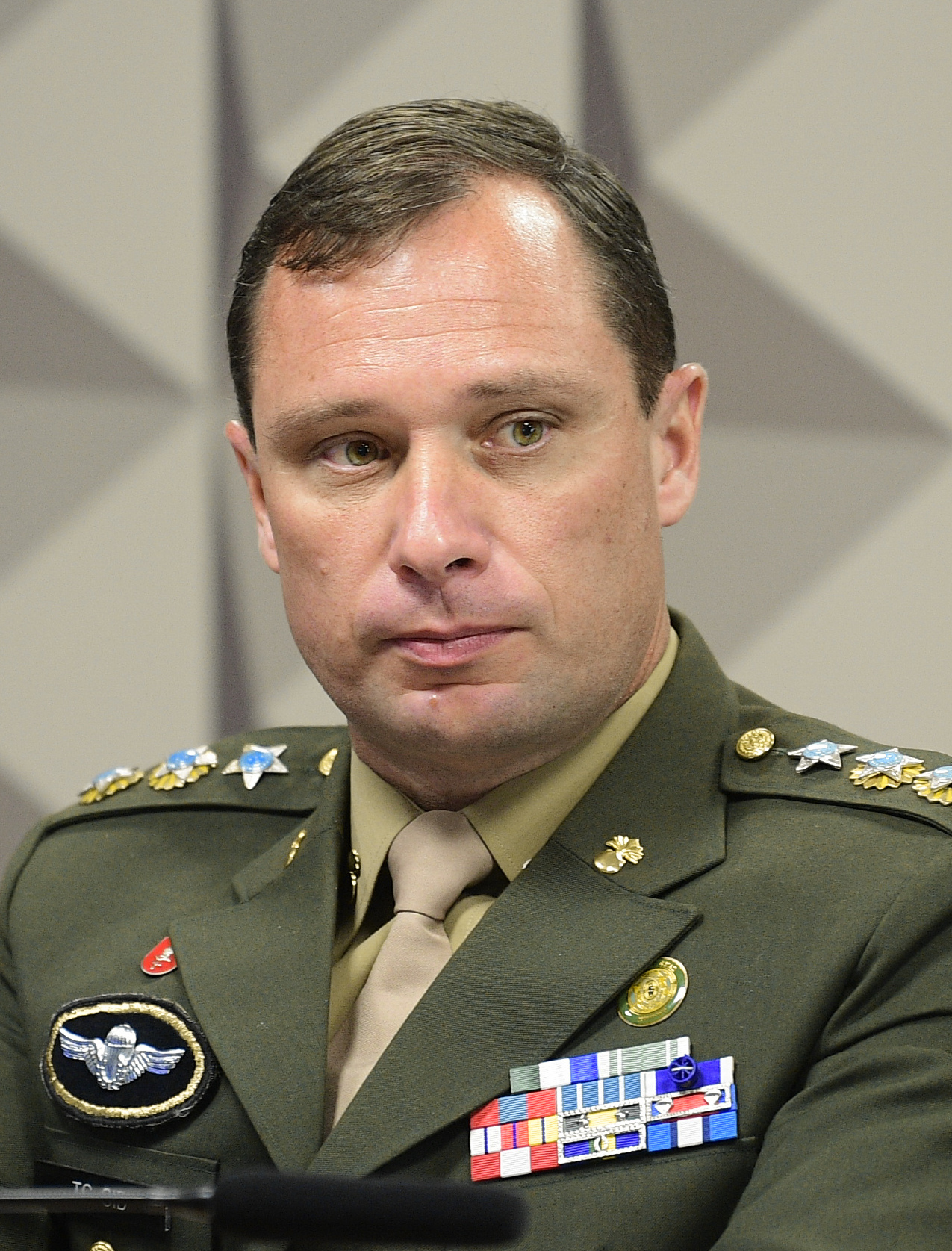
Alexandre Ramagem, Almir Garnier Santos, Anderson Torres, and Mauro Cid were some of the targets of Operation Counter-coup.

Operation Counter-coup (Portuguese: Operação Contragolpe, Brazilian Portuguese pronunciation: [opeɾɐˈsɐ̃w kotɾaˈɡɔwpi]) was an investigation started by the Federal Police of Brazil on 19 November 2024, authorized by the Supreme Federal Court, to investigate crimes related to the 2022 Brazilian coup plot which aimed to prevent the inauguration of Luiz Inácio Lula da Silva and Geraldo Alckmin, president and vice president-elect of Brazil in 2022, respectively. The group under investigation, consisting of Brazilian Army Special Forces personnel and a federal police officer, allegedly planned to carry out assassinations and kidnappings of high-ranking officials using military and terrorist tactics. The operation was authorized by the Supreme Court justice Alexandre de Moraes, who emphasized the "extreme danger" posed by the individuals involved.

== Operation details ==
The investigation unveiled details of a plan by the group to monitor and assassinate Supreme Court justice Alexandre de Moraes, the then President-elect Luiz Inácio Lula da Silva, Vice-president elect Geraldo Alckmin, and an unknown fourth person, rumored to be former Justice Minister Flávio Dino, using methods such as poisoning, shooting, and explosives. Among the suspects arrested were four military personnel from a special forces unit known as "black kids" and a federal police officer. One of the officers, Brigade General Mario Fernandes, had served as executive secretary of the Secretariat-General of the Presidency when the ministry was headed by General Luiz Eduardo Ramos. He also served as acting secretary during cabinet reshuffles. According to the Supreme Court ruling, the plan involved using official Command Action Battalion vehicles for monitoring and intelligence activities against the targets.

As reported by the Brazilian Federal Police, the organization consisted of five operational cores:

- Virtual attacks (mainly through social media) against opponents
- Delegitimization of institutions such as the Supreme Court and the Superior Electoral Court
- Coup d’état planning
- Opposition to sanitary measures during the COVID-19 pandemic
- Misappropriation of public funds

The Federal Police highlighted that the group began monitoring authorities' activities after a meeting at the residence of former Defense Minister Walter Braga Netto in November 2022. Aide-de-camp Mauro Cid allegedly offered R$ 100,000 (approximately US$17,000 as of November 2024) to finance the assassination plot.

Among the considered plots was the simultaneous assassination of Lula and Alckmin to extinguish the winning ticket of the 2022 election. For this, they considered using chemical substances to cause organic collapse, exploiting Lula's vulnerable health. The group accepted the possibility of the perpetrators' deaths during the operations, demonstrating a willingness to take extreme measures in favor of the coup.

On 2 December 2024, Supreme Court justice Alexandre de Moraes authorized the transfer of brigade general Mário Fernandes and lieutenant colonel Rodrigo Bezerra, accused of planning a coup d'etat, to the Planalto Military Command. On 4 December, justice Moraes also authorized the transfer of Army lieutenant colonel Hélio Ferreira Lima to Brasília, one of the military personnel arrested in Operation Counter-coup.

On 14 December, general Walter Braga Netto was arrested by the Federal Police under the accusation of being the head of the coup planning, under the command of Jair Bolsonaro, and responsible for giving support to the plan.

On 30 December, justice Alexandre de Moraes suspended visits to lieutenant colonel Rodrigo Bezerra. His ruling occurred after Bezerra's sister was caught hiding electronic equipment in a panettone box. On the evening of 28 December, she tried to visit Bezerra with headphones, a USB cable and a memory card in the Army Police Battalion (BPEB), where Rodrigo Bezerra was arrested.

== Repercussions ==
In addition to gaining significant attention on social media and in local news, the case was covered extensively by international media outlets. Supporters of Lula expressed strong approval of the operation, but Bolsonaro allies, including his sons Flávio and Eduardo, sought to downplay the significance of the case, calling it a "smoke screen" and an attempt to attack the reputation of former president Jair Bolsonaro. They also questioned whether the "planning of a crime" could even be considered a crime under Brazilian law.

The international press also covered the indictment of former President Bolsonaro and 36 others for their alleged involvement in an attempted coup in Brazil.

== Indicted list ==
The Federal Police indicted 37 people for the crimes of violent abolition of the democratic state of law, coup d'etat and criminal organization:

1. Ailton Gonçalves Moraes Barros, retired Army captain
2. Alexandre Castilho Bitencourt da Silva, Army colonel
3. Alexandre Rodrigues Ramagem, former ABIN director
4. Almir Garnier Santos, former Navy commander
5. Amauri Feres Saad, lawyer
6. Anderson Gustavo Torres, former Justice Minister
7. Anderson Lima de Moura, Army colonel
8. Angelo Martins Denicoli, Army major
9. Augusto Heleno Ribeiro Pereira, former head of the Institutional Security Bureau
10. Bernardo Romão Corrêa Netto, Army colonel
11. Carlos Cesar Moretzsohn Rocha, engineer
12. Carlos Giovani Delevati Pasini, retired Army colonel
13. Cleverson Ney Magalhães, Army colonel
14. Estevam Cals Theóphilo Gaspar de Oliveira, Army general
15. Fabrício Moreira de Barros, Defense attaché in Tel Aviv
16. Filipe Garcia Martins, former special advisor to the Presidency
17. Fernando Cerimedo, Argentinian influencer
18. Giancarlo Gomes Rodrigues, Army sub-lieutenant
19. Guilherme Marques de Almeida, Army lieutenant-colonel
20. Helio Ferreira Lima, Army lieutenant-colonel
21. Jair Messias Bolsonaro, former president of Brazil
22. José Eduado de Oliveira e Silva, priest
23. Laercio Vergílio, retired Army general
24. Marcelo Bormevet, federal police officer
25. Marcelo Costa Câmara, retired Army colonel
26. Mario Fernandes, Army brigade general
27. Mauro Cesar Barbosa Cid, former aide-de-camp
28. Nilton Diniz Rodrigues, Army general
29. Paulo Renato de Oliveira Figueiredo Filho, blogger
30. Paulo Sérgio Nogueira de Oliveira, former Defense Minister
31. Rafael Martins de Oliveira, Army lieutenant colonel
32. Ronald Ferreira de Araújo Júnior, Army lieutenant colonel
33. Sergio Ricardo Cavaliere de Medeiros, Army lieutenant colonel
34. Tércio Arnaud Tomaz, former special advisor to the Presidency
35. Valdemar Costa Neto, president of the Liberal Party
36. Walter Souza Braga Netto, former Defense Minister
37. Wladimir Matos Soares, federal police officer

In December, three other military were also indicted:

1. Aparecido Andrade Portela, retired Army lieutenant and first substitute of senator Tereza Cristina
2. Reginaldo Vieira de Abreu, Army colonel
3. Rodrigo Bezerra Azevedo, Army lieutenant colonel

== See also ==
- 2022 Brazilian coup plot
- AP 2668
