= 2022–2023 Brazilian election protests =

- Part of the 2022 Brazilian coup plot
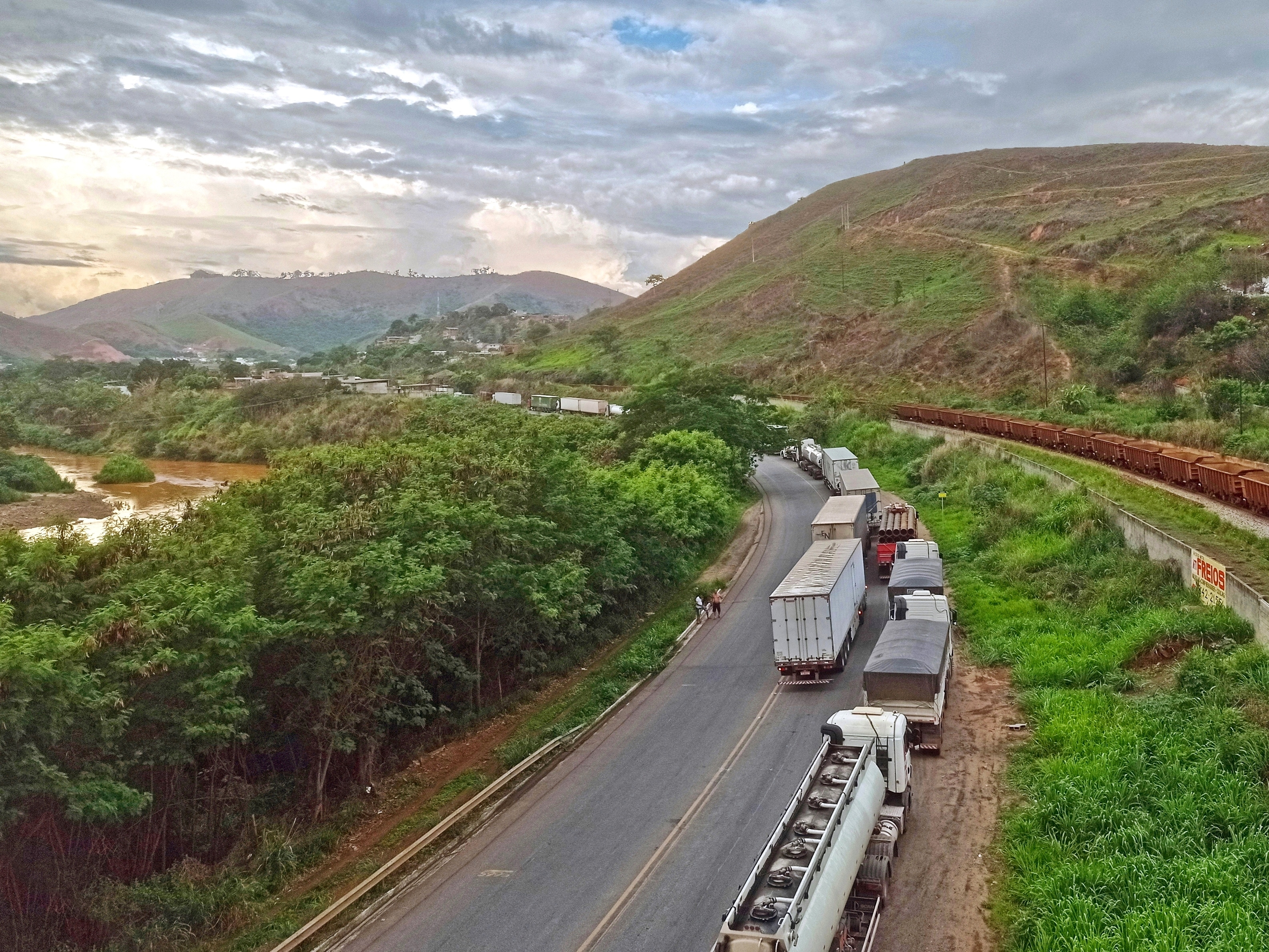
- Truckers protesting against the result of the 2022 presidential elections in the BR-381, Timóteo, Minas Gerais
- Date: 2022 – 8 January 2023 (2 months, 1 week and 2 days)
- Location: Brazil: 25 states and the Federal District
- Caused by: Victory of Luiz Inácio Lula da Silva in the 2022 Brazilian general election; False claims of electoral fraud made by then-president Jair Bolsonaro and his allies; Distrust in the electoral process, congress and judiciary; Right-wing extremism in Brazil
- Goals: Contest or overturn President-elect Luiz Inácio Lula da Silva's victory in the election; Interfere with the transition of the presidency to Lula da Silva; Maintenance, or return, of Jair Bolsonaro as President of Brazil; Military intervention against president-elect Lula da Silva
- Methods: Protest: picketing, political demonstrations, Internet activism, barricades, roadblocks and street blockades; direct action: strikes, civil disobedience and civil resistance; Civil disorder: Political violence, riots, vandalism, arson, occupation of public buildings and looting; Terrorism: bomb threats and attempted bombing
- Result: Protests concluded: Attempts to overturn the 2022 presidential election failed; Protesters fail to organize large-scale dissent or affect the transition of power; Congress, Supreme Court and Electoral Court certify Lula's victory in the 2022 election; Protests, blockades and camps eventually subsided or dismantled; Increased security in government buildings during and after the 2023 presidential inauguration; Luiz Inácio Lula da Silva becomes President of Brazil for his third mandate; Rioters storm the Praça dos Três Poderes in Brasília; Mass arrests and dismantlement of blockades and camps in response to violent attacks by protesters; Jair Bolsonaro acknowledges defeat in the 2022 presidential election and formally condemns the 8 January attacks; Instauration of the 8 January CPMI and federal investigations against ex-president Jair Bolsonaro and close allies; Small-scale protests continue into the Lula presidency

Parties
Pro-Bolsonaro groups and sympathizers: Pro-gun activists	Law enforcement: Federal Highway Police; Riot Police Component; Military Police; Riot police; Federal Police; National Public Security Force; Anti-Bolsonaro counter-protesters: Homeless Workers' Movement; Torcidas organizadas; Gaviões da Fiel; Galoucura; Império Alviverde

Casualties
- Deaths: 4 (2 Lula supporters killed by Bolsonaro supporters, 2 motorists killed in crashes due to roadblocks by Bolsonaro supporters)
- Injuries: 18
- Arrested: 2,000+

Protests relating to the 2022 Brazilian general election transpired in the lead-up to it, and dramatically increased shortly after the conclusion of its second round on 30 October, in which Luiz Inácio Lula da Silva was elected president. The protestors held mass protests and roadblocks nationwide. Supporters of Jair Bolsonaro, alleging election fraud, began blocking roads and highways in the country. At least 23 Brazilian states, plus the Federal District, recorded roadblocks as of 1 November, adding up to at least 267 roadblocks according to data from Federal Highway Police (PRF).

The protesters have in common the rejection of the election result, allegation of frauds and call for a coup or a federal or military intervention to reassess the elections results and even to prevent the president inauguration, which affronts the Brazilian Constitution. These blockades have been widely criticized by entities, politicians, and authorities due to the fact that they have caused disruptions to the food supply, paralysis of the supply of products such as fuel and medicines, impediment of the citizen's right to transit, cancellation of flights, crashes, and deaths. They have also been called attacks against democracy, as they contest the electoral process and its legitimacy. The protests have since been characterized as domestic terrorism by part of the Brazilian media.

On 8 January 2023, pro-Bolsonaro demonstrators stormed the Praça dos Três Poderes, assaulting the Chamber of Deputies and the Federal Senate halls of the National Congress of Brazil, the Supreme Federal Court palace and the Palácio do Planalto in an attempt to overthrow the Federal Government. The insurrection failed and the Praça was cleared by law enforcement after a few hours; several thousand Bolsonaro supporters were arrested following the event.

== Background ==
The protests were motivated by the belief that the 2022 Brazilian general election suffered from widespread electoral fraud causing Jair Bolsonaro's loss. During his presidency, Bolsonaro fueled distrust in the electoral system of Brazil. This was further fueled by Bolsonaro supporters alleging fraud of the electronic voting machines malfunctioning and of voting patterns they deemed suspicious, and who mistrust election officials; the military helped oversee the election and found no signs of fraud. Another reason for the protests was dislike for Luiz Inácio Lula da Silva, who had defeated Bolsonaro in the elections after his controversial convictions in Operation Car Wash had been annulled. Additionally, Bolsonaro did not recognize or accept his loss and pave the way for a peaceful transfer of power. Social media was used by supporters of Bolsonaro to spread misinformation about electoral fraud, motivating the protesters.

A video published on 16 October was one of several attempts by Marcos Koury, a member of the military reserve, to incite a general strike of truckers before the second round of elections. The idea was that drivers should paralyze Brazil to show support for Bolsonaro, who would have time to publish a provisional measure that would institute printed voting. Koury's video about the shutdowns was shared in several Bolsonaro groups on Telegram, and days later members of these same groups started advocating roadblocks after the elections. Calls for the shutdown were also made on TikTok and YouTube.

== Timeline ==
=== Road and highway blockades ===
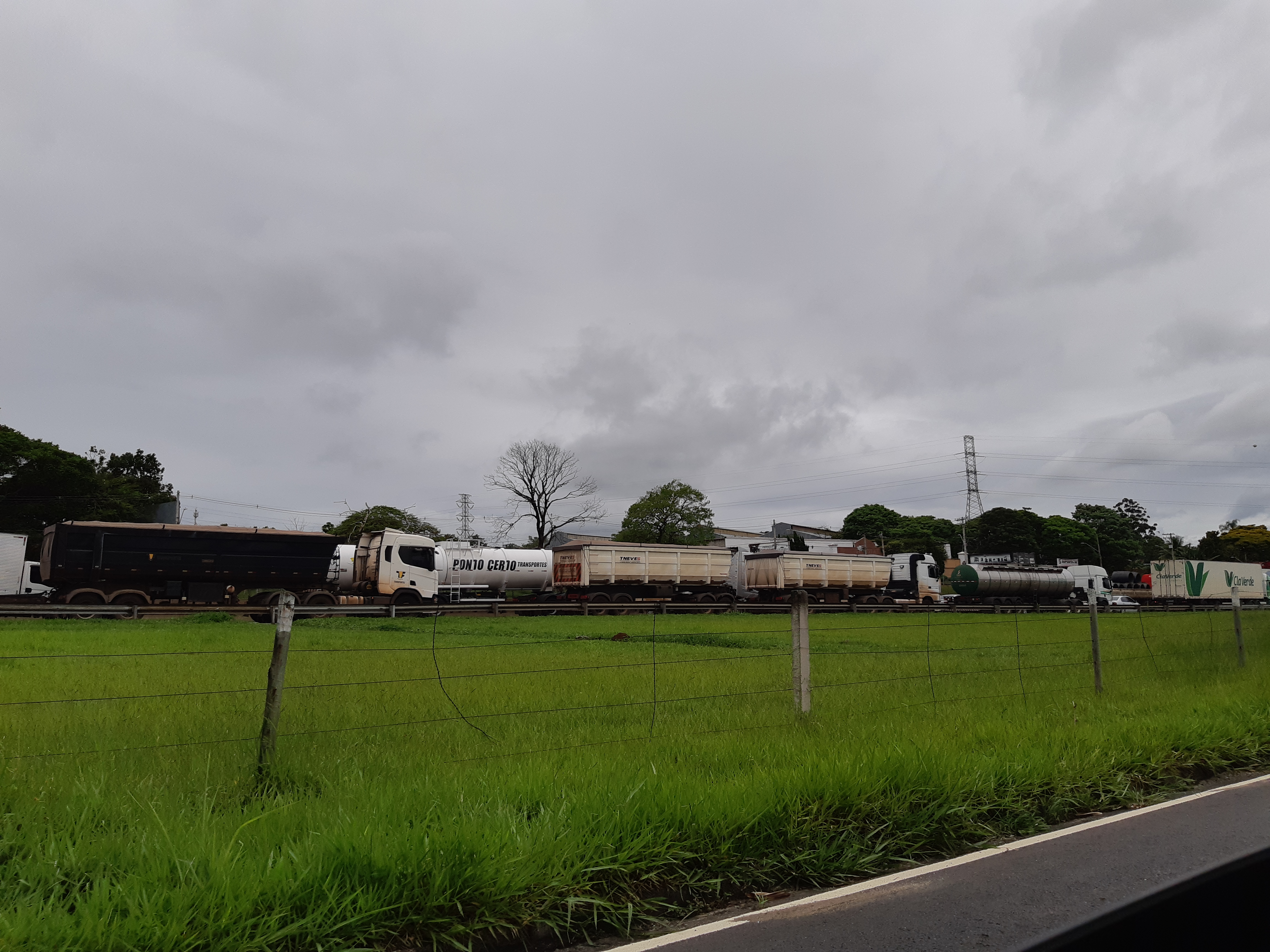
Blockade in the Presidente Dutra Highway (BR-116), Taubaté, São Paulo.

Supporters of President Jair Bolsonaro, including truck drivers, started blockades across the country on the night of 30 October, when the election results were announced. Until the night of 31 October, the PRF (Federal Highway Police) had registered 321 points of blockages or agglomerations on roads in 25 states and the Federal District. The state with the highest number of blocks was Santa Catarina.

The Federal Highway Police announced on 9 November that all federal highways had been cleared of roadblocks and interdictions with a total of 1,087 demonstrations being broken up. Truckers again started blockading roads on 18 November. The Federal Highway Police later stated that the new blockades were different from the previous ones, noting that protesters adopted violent methods which occurred mostly at night.

==== Assassination of Marcelo de Arruda ====
On 10 July, Worker's Party treasurer Marcelo de Arruda was assassinated while celebrating his 50th birthday when a Bolsonaro supporter stormed the event and shot de Arruda three times while screaming support for Bolsonaro. de Arruda himself shot his assassin back, leaving him in critical condition, however, de Arruda died of injuries.

==== Attempted invasion of the Guarulhos Airport ====
On the night of October 31, at 8:00 pm, around 50 Bolsonaro supporters closed the two runways of the Hélio Smidt Highway, which provides access to Guarulhos International Airport, which caused delays and flight cancellations. In the early hours of November 1, protesters invaded the runway, a video captured a man wearing a Federal Highway Police uniform cutting the fence to allow Bolsonaro supporters to enter. The following day, PRF agents cleared the highway. In all, 25 flights were canceled. An internal investigation by the PRF confirmed that some agents of the corporation were in fact helping the protesters.

==== Standoffs with organized football club fans ====
On 1 November, members of the Gaviões da Fiel, organized fans of Corinthians dispersed protesters that were interdicting the Marginal Tietê, the main highway in São Paulo, and unfurled a banner saying "We are for democracy". The following day, more fans mobilized against the blockade on the Presidente Dutra Highway (BR-116), which connects São Paulo to Rio de Janeiro, dispersing the demonstrators and removing signs and flags that called for federal intervention.

Members of Galoucura, organized association football fans of Atlético Mineiro, also broke through roadblocks on 1 November, when fans put out tires and cleared traffic on Rodovia Fernão Dias (BR-381), which connects Belo Horizonte to São Paulo.

Two days later, on November 3, Império Alviverde, organized team fans from the Coritiba Foot Ball Club, broke through blockades in the cities of Mafra and Papanduva, on the way back from Caxias do Sul to Curitiba, after departure. The Federal Highway Police had to intervene in the conflicts.

==== Attacks against police and civilians ====
On 9 September, 42-year old Lula supporter, Benedito Cardoso dos Santos was stabbed to death by 24-year-old Bolsonaro supporter, Rafael Silva de Oliveira in Mato Grasso.

On 1 November, protesters threatened to burn alive students from the Federal University of Rio de Janeiro (UFRJ) on the grounds that they were supposedly supporters of president-elect Lula.

===== Novo Progresso riots =====
Novo Progresso was the most pro-Bolsonaro municipality in Pará in 2022, with Jair Bolsonaro winning 79.60% of the votes in the first round of the elections. The municipality was also known for its high deforestation rates. In 2011, part of the population entered into conflict with the Ibama to defend Ezequiel Antônio Castanha, the greatest deforester of the Amazon rainforest of all time. On November 1, the Federal Public Ministry (MPF) had already requested that the PF investigate and arrest the organizers and participants of the protests in the state.

Protests began in the city on October 30, the day that Jair Bolsonaro's defeat at the polls was announced. On November 2, Ruan Carlos Rodrigues Porto, deputy commander of the Military Police (PM) in the city, was fired for refusing to comply with the unblocking order. 2 days later, on November 4, protesters cut down several trees to block km 332 of the BR-163, including a chestnut tree at risk of extinction that was over a hundred years old and 30 meters tall. The highway was cleared by the PRF the following day, and the MPF asked police officers and the Ibama to investigate the case. During the standoff, police used pepper spray to disperse the population, the blockade had affected fuel supplies and the city council had cancelled classes and rubbish collection.

On 7 November, Federal Highway Police officers attempted to negotiate a peaceful demobilization of the protest, but were attacked by protesters. The protesters threw stones and shot at four vehicles while shouting profanities, a child was poisoned by gas thrown by the police to contain the protesters and had to be hospitalized, one police officer was also injured during the standoff. The Shock Troops of the police were later called to participate in the unblocking.

On the 19th, the highway was completely blocked again. And on the 24th, the Federal Police carried out operation 163LIVRE, which was responsible for 10 temporary arrest warrants and another 11 search and seizure warrants for those involved in the protests for the crimes of illegal coercion, qualified damage, attacks on freedom of work, disobedience and contempt. Six people were temporarily arrested and four became fugitives, one of the fugitives, Claudia Kummer, a 48-year-old teacher and civil servant, was identified as the organizer of the protests, her defense argued that she was innocent and was not in Novo Progresso at the time of her arrest because she was undergoing surgery in Sinop, even though on November 2, she had recorded a video calling for violent protests. On the 29th, the arrested were released.

Later, on January 8, 2023, after the riots in Brasília, protesters yet again closed the BR-163 and set fire to tires, though the protest was later dispersed by Federal Highway and Military Police.

==== Salute similar to the Nazi salute during protests ====
External videos
- Protestors from São Miguel do Oeste make a sig heil-like salute as they sing the national anthem

On 2 November, in the blockade carried out on the SC-163 highway, in São Miguel do Oeste, Santa Catarina, the protesters held a solemn moment to celebrate the Brazilian National Anthem, during which they made gestures similar to the Nazi salute. Videos of the event were widely shared, and caused numerous reactions of astonishment and condemnation. The state of Santa Catarina has already registered a large expansion of neo-Nazi groups in recent years. Earlier that year, in an operation carried out in October, members of the neo-Nazi group Nova SS de SC (New SS of Santa Catarina) were arrested. The group had melee weapons, handcrafts and 3D printers intended for the manufacture of weapons. The current deputy governor of the state, and elected federal deputy, Daniela Reinehr, is the daughter of Altair Reinehr, a notorious propagator of Nazi ideas, which the parliamentarian refuses to publicly condemn. A letter was later sent to the Federal Police to investigate the threats that Reinehr began to suffer after the act.

The German Embassy issued a note saying that the gesture was an "attack against Brazilian democracy". The Israeli Embassy also issued a note saying that it was concerned about the action and asked the authorities to take the necessary measures. The State Public Ministry and the Prosecutor's Office of Santa Catarina launched an investigation into the case. However, it had already informed, in a preliminary investigation, that it does not see the practice of crime, and claimed that the gesture was only an "oath to the flag".

==== Consequences ====
The blockades of roads and highways have affected various sectors of society, such as the meat and milk industries, partial paralysis of the meat industry, and the supply of supermarkets and gas stations. Several hospitals were also affected. There was general concern about the supply of oxygen and other supplies. Some hospitals had to cancel surgeries. The Butantan Institute informed that a load of eggs that will be used to produce vaccines against the flu is stuck in a blockade near Jundiaí, 47 km from São Paulo. If the cargo does not arrive at Butantan, which is located in the west zone of São Paulo, the production of 1.5 million doses of the immunizer against H3N2 may be compromised.

By 9:30 UTC−3 on 1 November, around 25 flights had been canceled at the São Paulo/Guarulhos International Airport due to the blockade of the Helio Smidt highway by Bolsonarists. The blockades have caused fatal accidents, as in Várzea Grande, Mato Grosso, where a driver died when his car collided with a truck stopped at a roadblock on BR-364. In Ipatinga, Minas Gerais, a motorcyclist died and a woman on the back was injured after crashing into a tanker truck on the urban stretch of BR-381. At the time of the collision, the truck was maneuvering to return after being blocked at a roadblock. In Mirassol, São Paulo, a driver ran over protesters on the Washington Luís Highway, leaving 17 injured, including two children.

=== Street protests ===
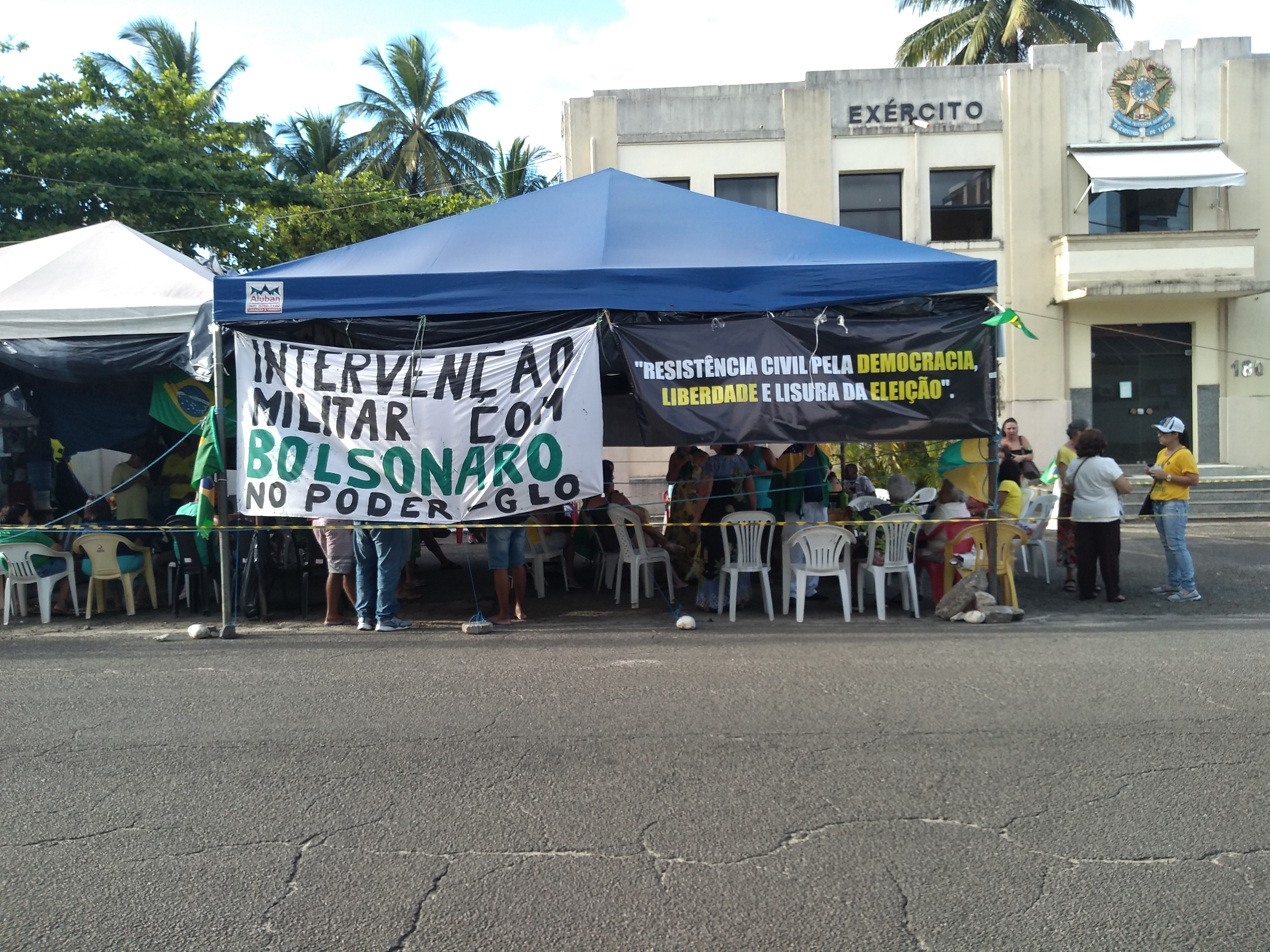
Protest camp in front of the Brazilian Army's barracks in Ilhéus, Bahia.

The protests on the roads lost strength on 3 November, But supporters of Jair Bolsonaro started concentrating in the vicinity of Brazilian Armed Forces facilities, such as Military barracks and Tiro de Guerra buildings, in acts and vigils against the victory of Luiz Inácio Lula da Silva since then. The movement is spread across the country and has no defined national leaders. Demonstrations were recorded at military installations in the cities of São Paulo, Rio de Janeiro, Brasília, Florianópolis, Recife, Salvador, among other Brazilian cities and regions.

Protesters camped to call for a military coup to prevent the inauguration of Luiz Inácio Lula da Silva in some cities. Reports sent by the Military, Civil and Federal Police and by Public Ministries in the states and in the Federal District to the Federal Supreme Court (STF) indicate that politicians, police, unionists and ruralists encourage and finance the protests and that most of the demonstrators are elderly, with a small presence of young people and families.

During the Republic Proclamation Day on 15 November, Bolsonaro supporters held protests across the country. The federal government stated on 11 January that it had prepared for more protests, after messages appeared on pro-Bolsonaro social media channels calling for large protests in Brazilian cities to "retake power". No major protests were however held.

==== Fake news ====
External videos
- Protesters cry after hearing a fake news about the supposed arrest of Alexandre de Moraes

False or old images of battle tanks on the streets were spread. Bolsonaro supporters protesting in front of the Eastern Military Command (RJ) celebrated and cried after hearing that a "federal intervention" was decreed and that TSE's minister Alexandre de Moraes was "arrested for fraud in the electronic voting machines", this was later confirmed as being fake news.

The false information that Lady Gaga would actually be the "prime minister" of the International Criminal Court located in The Hague went viral on Twitter. The hoax was accompanied by a montage in which the singer appeared to participate in a videoconference with Jair Bolsonaro and claimed that Stefani Germanotta, which is Gaga's real name, was analyzing cases of electoral fraud in Brazil. The International Criminal Court does not hold that post, and Gaga is not a part of the International Criminal Court. False information about the alleged death of Luiz Inácio Lula da Silva were also spread online.

=== Violence and attempted terrorist attacks ===
On 12 December, after Lula's electoral victory was officially ratified by Brazilian courts, militant hard-right Bolsonaro supporters stormed the Federal Police headquarters in Brasilia and torched vehicles on the street after one of the protesters was arrested for inciting violence to prevent the swearing-in of Lula. The police used stun grenades and tear gas to disperse them.

A bombing attempt near the Brasília International Airport was prevented by the police on 23 December, and the suspect was arrested a day later. According to his testimony, he was motivated by Bolsonaro casting doubts at the integrity of the election process in past. On 29 December the police tried removing protestors from around the Brazilian Army headquarters, but were forced to withdraw after they turned violent.

A man carrying an explosive device (presumably fireworks) and a knife was arrested on 1 January 2023 while trying to enter the esplanade of Brasília, where government officials and Lula supporters were attending his inauguration.

Bolsonaro supporters stormed the buildings of the National Congress, Palácio da Alvorada and the Supreme Federal Court on 8 January and clashed with the police. The rioters smashed some of the property inside the three buildings, publicly urinated and defecated, while the police used pepper spray and tear gas against them. President Lula was not present at the presidential palace when it was stormed. The federal government estimated the total number of intruders in the three buildings as around 5,000. All three federal buildings were later cleared with more than 1,500 people arrested. 684 of them were later released on humanitarian grounds.

== Financing ==
Demands for an investigation into possible funding for the blockades and demonstrations have grown, mainly due to the circulation of videos of organized stalls serving drinks and food, including barbecues. there are suspicions of hidden funding enabling, or even demanding, the stoppage of truck drivers involved in the demonstrations. The Attorney General of Justice of São Paulo also affirmed the suspicions of financing by businessmen, adding that there are already suspects and evidence.

Businessmen from several states financed caravans to Brasília to reinforce the protests calling for a military intervention in front of the army's headquarters in the city, more than 70 trucks with the Brazilian flag arrived on November 6 and 7, entrepreneurs from the municipality of Água Boa, in Mato Grosso, organized a joint action by sending 23 trucks, twelve trucks bore the name of Agritex, a reseller of agricultural machinery, parts and equipment, another seven vehicles displayed the logo of Grupo Comelli, from Rio Verde, in Goiás, a company specialized in biomass processing, in all, vehicle license plates are from at least four states: Mato Grosso, Goiás, Bahia and Santa Catarina.

On 3 November, the Military Police of Alagoas delivered a report to the STF identifying WhatsApp and Telegram groups and the leaders involved in the state's acts. The police concluded that the leaderships are not centralized; The leadership of Kayo Gustavo Fragoso Carneiro da Cunha stands out, candidate for federal deputy in the general elections of 2022. On November 8, the Public Ministries of São Paulo, Santa Catarina and Espírito Santo also made complaints to the TSE about financing part of businessmen, municipal buses that transported the demonstrators and financing by Pix. In Espírito Santo, businessmen sold their products during the protests. In Santa Catarina, there was the participation of politicians, including a councilor. On the same day, the Civil Police of Paraná sent a report denouncing a councilor and several former councillors, a municipal attorney, an advisor to a federal deputy and numerous businessmen in organizing and financing the protests. Among them are Aurélio Ramos de Oliveira Neto, Sandro Nascimento Ferreira Branco and Éder Mauro.

On 12 November, the MPF asked the Minister of Defense, Paulo Sérgio Nogueira de Oliveira, to identify those responsible for calling and financing the protests. On 17 November, Minister Alexandre de Moraes decided to block 43 bank accounts of individuals and legal entities suspected of financing anti-democratic acts. The magistrate explained:

In this case, there has been repeated abuse of the right to assemble, illicitly and criminally directed to propagate non-compliance and disrespect for the result of the election for President and Vice-President of the Republic, whose result was proclaimed by the Superior Electoral Court on 30/10/2022, with the consequent disruption of the Democratic State of Law and the installation of an exception regime.

— Alexandre de Moraes

=== Luciano Hang ===
Initially, rumors circulated linking businessman Luciano Hang to the organization and financing of the demonstrations, mainly due to the preference of the protesters to carry out concentrations in front of chain stores Havan, the businessman denied contributing to the organization of the movement.

However, it was confirmed in a report by Agência Pública, which had exclusive access to documents from the Federal Highway Police, that the chain of stores Havan sent its service trucks to the roadblocks roads, along with Transben Transportes, a company named after his wife, Andrea Benvenutti Hang, Hang's sister-in-law and father-in-law, and Premix Concreto. The companies organized the trucks to KM 83 of the BR-101, in Barra Velha, for a protest that took place in front of the Maiochi gas station, close to a Havan store. In Palhoça, an Havan store even offered chairs, benches, access to the bathroom and electrical connection for the speakers to the protesters.

=== Emílio Dalçoquio Neto ===
The businessman and founder of the "Lux Institute", Emílio Dalçoquio Neto, has been pointed out by reports from the Federal Highway Police that were publicized by the media, as a leader of the blockades and organized acts in the state of Santa Catarina, also participating in national mobilization networks. Dalçoquio is identified in several videos making speeches to encourage protests, as he also owns several vehicles used in the blockades. Emílio is already known for his participation in the Truck drivers' strike in 2018, which led to an investigation of the carrier Dalçoquio by the Federal Police for preventing the return of the company's activities as a way to influence the negotiations and context of the strike, a crime known as "locaute". The company had even sent a letter supporting the strikes.

== Criticism of the responses by the Military and Federal Highway Polices ==
External videos
- Federal Highway Police agent saying "the only order we have is to be here with you, that's all."

On the day of the blockades, the PRF activated the Office of the General Counsel for the Union (AGU) to ensure the flow of roads, but the AGU responded that the PRF could act without authorization from the agency. The PRF released a statement saying that it "has adopted all measures to return the flow to normal", and that it is prioritizing dialogue to ensure the right to protest. Some people criticized the apparent inaction of the PRF, which the day before conducted operations considered illegal throughout the country. Several videos were released in which the policemen said that they would not do anything about the blockade. In one, the policeman states that the order was only to monitor the demonstrations.

The Supreme Federal Court (STF) ordered that the PRF immediately unblock the roads under penalty of R$100,000 per hour to General Director Silvinei Vasques. Minister Alexandre de Moraes issued a note on 31 October, urging the PRF to take "all necessary and sufficient measures" to open the roads. The determination cites the "omissive" and "inert" posture of Director-General Silvinei Vasques. The letter states the possibility of removal of the director if he fails to comply with the determination. Besides the PRF, the president of the TSE demanded the collaboration of other public security forces to clear the roads.

Videos circulated of PRF officers allying themselves with the protesters. Newspapers reported that the tone of the policemen is one of leniency. The PRF directorate said that it did not send any support orders and that procedures will be opened to investigate the cases of police officers who did so. The police officers have not been removed, as the organization believes it needs as many people as possible to act during the protests.

In December 2022, members of the Military Police of Mato Grosso who were eating in a camp set up by Protesters in front of the 13th Motorized Infantry Brigade of the Military Command West, in Cuiabá, approached and detained students who filmed them without clear accusation.

== Reactions ==
=== Politicians and social movements ===
Bolsonaro's first public speech after being defeated by Lula

Deputies Nikolas Ferreira of the Liberal Party (PL), Daniel Silveira of the Brazilian Labour Party (PTB), and Carla Zambelli of the PL supported and encouraged the actions of the Bolsonarists who are blocking the roads. Ferreira wrote that "a soldier who goes to war and is afraid to die is a coward". Senator Simone Tebet of the Brazilian Democratic Movement, who was defeated in the first round, said that roadblocks by supporters of Bolsonaro are "antidemocratic" and that the "moment now is for peace and unity". Brazil's incoming president, Luiz Inácio Lula da Silva, has vowed to punish protesters who stormed into Congress, The Supreme Court, and the Presidential Palace.

45 hours after the end of the second round, Bolsonaro gave a brief speech, saying: "Peaceful demonstrations will always be welcome, but our methods cannot be those of the left, which have always harmed the population, such as invading property, destroying heritage, and curtailing the right to transit." The next day, he recorded a video for supporters asking for the clearing of highways. The vice president, Hamilton Mourão, recognized the legitimacy of the election result, discarded the "possibility of fraud", repudiated the demonstrations and advised the participants to "put the ball down", and concluded that "it's no use crying anymore".

The Homeless Workers' Movement (MTST) has instructed its militants to organize demonstrations to unblock the main access roads, and also not to clash with the protesters. The PT president Gleisi Hoffmann said that the state is the one that should deal with the protests, and declared that the new government would maintain dialogue with the truck drivers.

=== Superior Electoral Court ===
The Superior Electoral Court sent several court orders to shut down the Telegram and WhatsApp groups, as well as the TikTok and YouTube channels, which were used to organize protests urging the military to invoke article 142 of the Constitution of Brazil to stage a coup. The orders were heeded by the technology companies. Among those who had their social networks blocked are Carla Zambelli, Adrilles Jorge, Cabo Gilberto Silva, José Medeiros, Monark and Nikolas Ferreira. Zambelli created new accounts, which were also taken down. Then said that she would report the case to the Inter-American Commission on Human Rights (IACHR). The social network Gettr asked the STF for access to the process that determined the blocking of Zambelli on the platform.

=== Supreme Federal Court ===
The STF held Bolsonaro responsible for the protests and ordered the immediate unblocking of the roads. Moraes also considered the actions of the PRF as omissive and inert.

=== Truck drivers ===
Leaders of organizations of the truckers category made different statements about the movement. Wallace Landim, also known as Chorão, president of the Brazilian Association of Drivers of Motor Vehicles (Abrava), repudiated the blockades. The president of the Parliamentary Mixed Front for the Defense of Independent and Full-Time Truck Drivers, Nereu Crispim, affirmed that there are no plans to paralyze the category as a whole. The president of the Ourinhos Truck Drivers Union confirmed the mobilization of the category for strikes. The mobilization has taken place mainly through Telegram groups, and counts on independent leaders from the main entities of the category.

=== Engineering Society of Rio Grande do Sul ===
On 30 November 2022, the Engineering Society of Rio Grande do Sul issued a note calling for a military coup and the suspension of the inauguration of the elected president, Due to the note, considered by many to be anti-democratic, the Society was denounced to the STF.

=== International media ===
The roadblocks have had great repercussions in the international media, being highlighted as "disturbances". The French newspaper Le Monde highlighted the "potentially deleterious consequences" that these blockades will cause to Brazil's economy, British broadcaster BBC cited the protests as causing "considerable disturbance" to the daily lives of Brazilians, The Italian La Repubblica pointed to Bolsonaro's "absolute silence" while Brazil was "in flames", American newspaper The New York Times said that the road protests "echoes Bolsonaro's baseless claims before the election", while The Washington Post reported the fact that the roadblocks have been organized by pro-Bolsonaro Telegram channels.

== See also ==
- 2022–2023 Peruvian political protests
- 2022 Brazilian attempted coup plot
- Police operations in the 2022 Brazilian general election
