= Francisco Joseli Parente Camelo =

Brazilian judge (born 1953)

His Excellency Francisco Joseli Parente Camelo
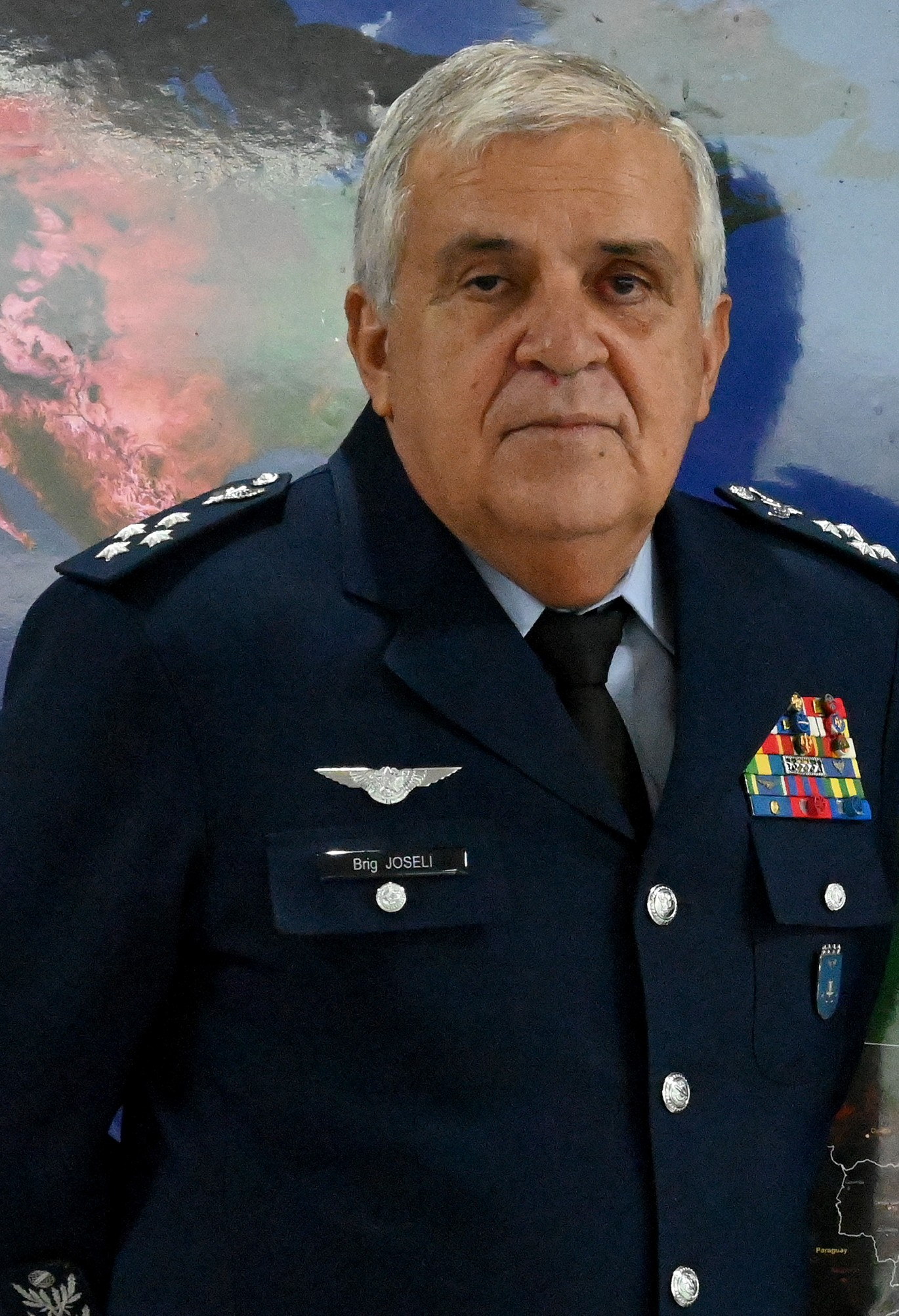

Justice of the Superior Military Court
- Incumbent
- Assumed office 7 May 2015
- Nominated by: Dilma Rousseff

President of the Superior Military Court
- In office 16 March 2023 – 12 March 2025
- Preceded by: Lúcio Mário de Barros Góes
- Succeeded by: Maria Elizabeth Rocha

Vice President of the Superior Military Court
- Incumbent
- Assumed office 12 March 2025
- Preceded by: José Coelho Ferreira

Personal details
- Born: 25 April 1953 (age 73) Fortaleza, Ceará, Brazil

Military service
- Allegiance: Brazil
- Branch/service: Brazilian Air Force
- Years of service: 1969–present
- Rank: Lieutenant-Brigadier

Francisco Joseli Parente Camelo (born 25 April 1953) is a general officer in the Brazilian Air Force. He serves as a justice and the current Vice President of Brazil's Superior Military Court (STM), having previously served as its President from 2023 to 2025. In June 2023, he was awarded the Grand Cross of the Order of Defense Merit by President Luiz Inácio Lula da Silva.
