= Superior Military Court (Brazil) =

The Superior Military Court (Brazilian Portuguese: Superior Tribunal Militar, STM) is a body of Brazil's Military Justice system, composed of fifteen life-tenured justices appointed by the president of the Republic after approval by the Federal Senate. Of the fifteen members, three are selected from among general officers of the Navy, four from among general officers of the Army, and three from among general officers of the Air Force — all on active duty and at the highest rank of their respective careers — while five are civilians.

The civilian ministers are appointed by the president of the Republic from among Brazilian citizens over thirty-five and under seventy years of age. Three must be lawyers of notable legal knowledge and unblemished reputation with more than ten years of effective professional activity, and two are chosen, on a parity basis, from among military judges (auditor judges) of the Military Justice system and members of the Military Public Prosecutor's Office.

The STM has jurisdiction to hear appeals and other legal remedies against decisions issued by first-instance military judges, in accordance with Article 124 of the Federal Constitution. At the state level, a state military justice system may be established, composed in the first instance of judges of law and Councils of Justice, and in the second instance by the respective Court of Justice or by Military Courts of Justice in states whose military forces exceed twenty thousand members, in accordance with Article 125, paragraph 3 of the Federal Constitution.

The current president is Maria Elizabeth Rocha, and the vice-president is Francisco Joseli Parente Camelo, since 12 March 2025. This is the first time the court has been presided over by a woman.

== Current members ==
Incumbent president Incumbent vice president
Order of seniority	Justice	Initial date (inauguration)	Branch	Appointed by	Limite date (retirement)	Observations
1	Maria Elizabeth Rocha (born 1960)	27 March 2007	Civilian	Luiz Inácio Lula da Silva	29 January 2035	President (2014–2015; 2025–2027 term)
2	Artur Vidigal de Oliveira (born 1960)	11 May 2010	Civilian	Luiz Inácio Lula da Silva	6 October 2035	
3	José Barroso Filho (born 1967)	10 April 2014	Civilian	Dilma Rousseff	15 February 2042	
4	Francisco Joseli Parente Camelo (born 1953)	7 May 2015	Air Force	Dilma Rousseff	25 April 2028	Vice-President (2025–2027 term) President (2023–2025)
5	Péricles Aurélio Lima de Queiroz (born 1955)	1 June 2016	Civilian	Dilma Rousseff	25 February 2030	
6	Carlos Vuyk de Aquino (born 1956)	27 November 2018	Air Force	Michel Temer	8 May 2031	
7	Leonardo Puntel (born 1958)	2 October 2020	Navy	Jair Bolsonaro	27 November 2033	
8	Celso Luiz Nazareth (born 1957)	2 October 2020	Navy	Jair Bolsonaro	7 April 2032	
9	Carlos Augusto Amaral Oliveira (born 1960)	19 October 2020	Air Force	Jair Bolsonaro	13 May 2035	
10	Cláudio Portugal de Viveiros (born 1959)	5 August 2021	Navy	Jair Bolsonaro	2 February 2034	
11	Lourival Carvalho Silva (born 1958)	17 August 2022	Army	Jair Bolsonaro	10 December 2033	
12	Guido Amin Naves (born 1962)	24 February 2025	Army	Luiz Inácio Lula da Silva	8 June 2037	
13	Verônica Sterman (born 1984)	30 September 2025	Civilian	Luiz Inácio Lula da Silva	22 March 2059	
14	Anisio David de Oliveira Junior (born 1963)	4 December 2025	Army	Luiz Inácio Lula da Silva	27 October 2038	
15	Flavio Marcus Lancia Barbosa (born 1964)	9 December 2025	Army	Luiz Inácio Lula da Silva	28 February 2039	
