= Electoral system of Brazil =

Voting
- Universal, secret and direct
- Mandatory: Literate people aged 18 to 70
- Optional: People aged 16-17 or over 70 years old and illiterate people aged 18 to 70

Candidacy
- Mandatory party affiliation (independent candidacies not allowed); Possibility of non-verticalized coalitions; Gender quota (from 30% to 70%); Possibility of one only consecutive reelection (only for executive offices)

Elective offices
- Executive offices: President, governor and mayors
- Legislative offices: Senators, federal representatives, state representatives, district representatives and city councillors
- Term length: 8 years for senators and 4 years for all other offices.
- Frequency: Biennial alternation between municipal elections and federal and state elections

Campaign financing
- Private: Limited self donations and limited individual donations
- Public: Federal Party Fund and party political broadcast

Voting method and ballot
- Two-round system: President, governors and mayors in cities with more than 200,000 inhabitants
- First-past-the-post: Senators (alternating every 4 years) and mayors in cities with less than 200,000 inhabitants
- Plurality block voting: Senators (alternating every 4 years)
- Open list proportional representation: Federal, state and district representatives and city councillors
- Ballot: Electronic

The electoral system of Brazil is the set of means used to choose representatives and government members of the Federative Republic of Brazil. The current system is defined by the 1988 Constitution and the Electoral Code (Law No. 4,737 of 1965), in addition to being regulated by the Superior Electoral Court (Portuguese: Tribunal Superior Eleitoral, TSE) as delegated by law. The Constitution itself already defines three distinct electoral systems, which are detailed in the Electoral Code: proportional elections for the Chamber of Deputies, mirrored in the legislative branches at the state (Legislative Assemblies) and municipal (City Council) levels, majority elections with one or two elected representatives to the Federal Senate and majority elections in two rounds for president and other executive heads in other spheres.

== Plurality and majoritarian systems ==
The majority or plurality system is used in Brazil to elect the chief executive of all spheres (president, governors and mayors), and also for elections to the Federal Senate.

In presidential elections, the system employed is the two-round system to achieve absolute majority, where a person needs to obtain more than 50% of the valid votes, disregarding scratch and spoilt votes, to be elected. In order to ensure that this majority is obtained in a multi-party system, the election is held in two rounds. The first one is disputed by all the candidates, and the second is disputed only by the two best placed candidates in the first round. The second round only takes place if no candidate reaches an absolute majority in the first round of the election. This system is also used in elections for state governors and mayor of municipalities with more than 200,000 voters. In case of a tie, the age of the candidates is taken into account, and the oldest is elected.

The Federal Senate is renewed every four years in proportions of one third in one election and two thirds in the following, using first-past-the-post voting and plurality block voting respectively. Each state has three senators, regardless of its population size. Senators serve staggered terms. As the position of senator lasts eight years, each state elects one or two senators every four years. The election for the Senate takes place within each state, to choose the senators who will represent that state.

When only one member must be chosen, the candidate with a plurality of votes is used with separate elections for each state. In this system, known as First-past-the-post, each voter votes for only one candidate and the one who obtains the largest number of votes wins the election, without the need for a second round even if he does not obtain a majority. This system is also used to elect mayors of municipalities with less than 200,000 voters.

When two members are chosen, block voting is used -- each voter has two votes and the two candidates with the most votes are elected even if they do not have a majority.

== Proportional system ==
In elections for the Chamber of Deputies and for state and municipal legislative bodies, the Constitution provides for the use of a proportional system. In addition, at the federal level, the election must be held separately in each of the states and territories. Candidates for the Chamber of Deputies can only be voted in the state where candidates are launched, and will run only for seats reserved for that state. In addition to these restrictions, the Constitution also imposes a minimum limit of 8 and a maximum of 70 deputies for each state, defined in proportion to the population of each one.

The Brazilian Electoral Code determines that the proportional system used is an open list system, where the votes are nominal to the candidates and the party lists are composed of the most voted members of each party. In this type of system, each party obtains a number of seats proportional to the sum of the votes of all its candidates, and these seats are distributed, in order, to the most voted candidates of that party. In 2017, the Federal Constitution was amended with regard to party autonomy, resulting from Constitutional Amendment No. 97, which prohibited the formation of coalitions between parties for proportional elections, ensured only within the scope of majority elections, as provided for in the new wording of Article 17, § 1 of the Federal Constitution.

== See also ==
- Elections in Brazil
- Electronic voting in Brazil
- Politics of Brazil
