= Maria Elizabeth Rocha =

Brazilian judge (born 1960)

Her Excellency Maria Elizabeth Rocha
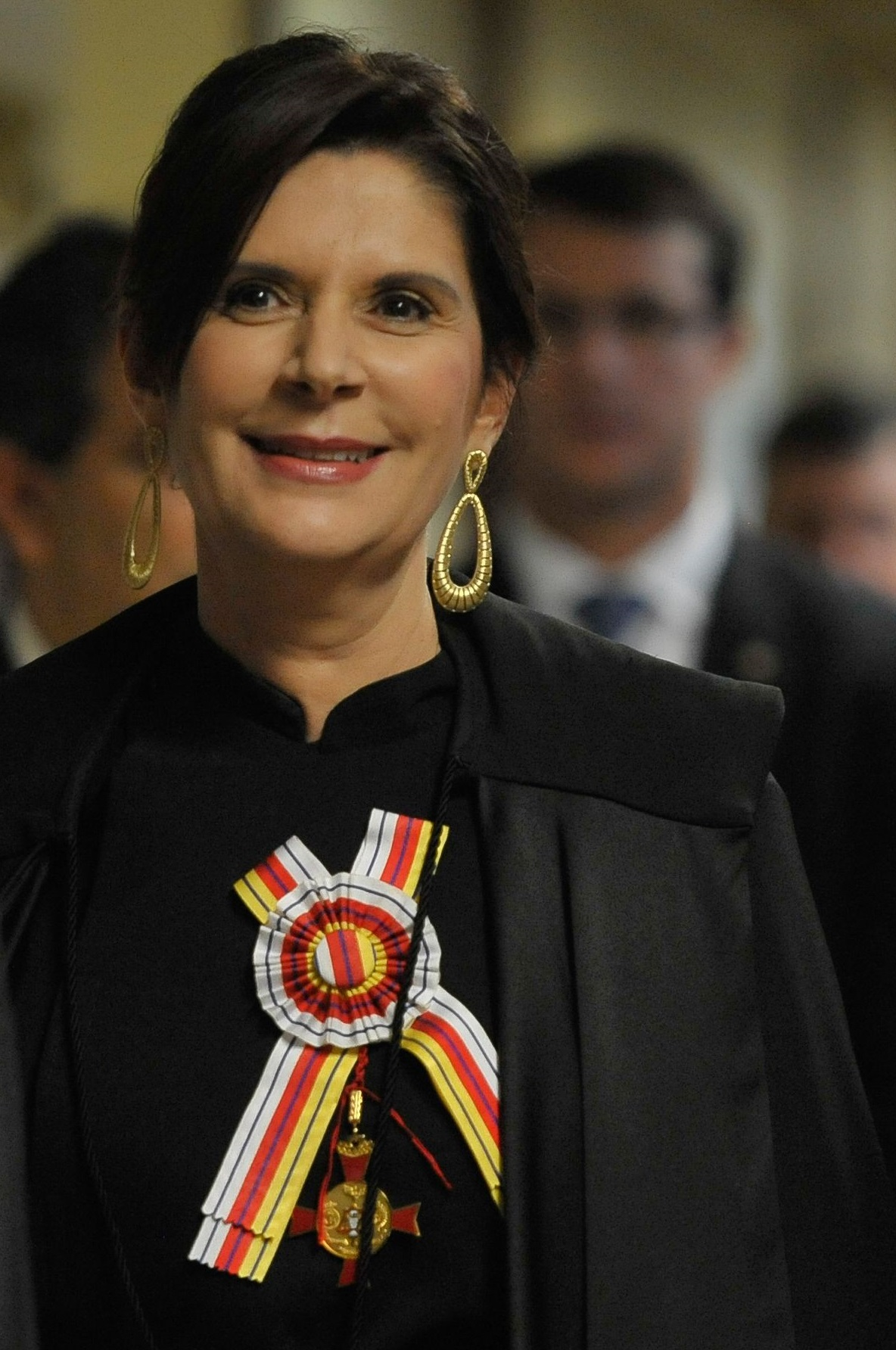

Justice of the Superior Military Court
- Incumbent
- Assumed office 27 March 2007
- Nominated by: Luiz Inácio Lula da Silva
- Preceded by: Antônio Carlos de Nogueira

President of the Superior Military Court
- Incumbent
- Assumed office 12 March 2025
- Preceded by: Francisco Joseli Parente Camelo
- In office 16 June 2014 – 15 March 2015
- Preceded by: Raymundo Nonato de Cerqueira Filho
- Succeeded by: William de Oliveira Barros

Personal details
- Born: 29 January 1960 (age 66) Belo Horizonte, Minas Gerais, Brazil
- Education: Pontifical Catholic University of Minas Gerais

Maria Elizabeth Guimarães Teixeira Rocha (born 29 January 1960) is a Brazilian magistrate who has served as a justice of the Superior Military Court (STM) since 2007 and as president of the court since 2025, a position she previously held from 2014 to 2015. She was the first woman appointed as a justice of the STM and the first woman to assume the presidency of the court in its 206-year history.

Previously, she worked as a lawyer and was a member of the Office of the Attorney General of the Union (AGU) from 1985 to 2007, in the career of federal attorney, and also held various legal advisory positions within the federal public administration.
