= Federal Police of Brazil =

Brazilian federal police

Federal Police of Brazil Polícia Federal do Brasil
- Federal Police emblem

- Federal Police flag
- Common name: Federal Police
- Abbreviation: PF

Agency overview
- Formed: 28 March 1944; 82 years ago
- Employees: 17,658 (2023)
- Annual budget: R$ 8.7 billion (2023)

Jurisdictional structure
- Federal agency: Brazil
- Operations jurisdiction: Brazil
- General nature: Federal law enforcement; Civilian police

Operational structure
- Headquarters: Setor Comercial Norte, Quadra 4, Bloco A, Torres B, C e D, Edifício Multibrasil Corporate, Asa Norte, Brasília, Distrito Federal, Brazil
- Agency executive: Andrei Rodrigues, Director-General
- Parent agency: Ministry of Justice and Public Security
- Units: 15: - Tactical Operations Command (COT); - Police Intelligence Direction (DIP); - Operational Aircraft Coordination (CAOP); - Bomb Disposal Unit; - Cyber-Crime Repression Service; - National System of Firearms (SINARM); - Immigration Police Coordination (CGPI); - Public Resources Deviation Repression Service (SRDP); - Witness Protection Program (DDH); - National Police Academy (ANP); - National Criminalistics Institute (INC); - National Identification Institute (INI); - Immigration Police Unit (CGPI); - Maritime Police Unit (NEPOM); - Technical-Scientific Unit (DITEC)

Website
- gov.br/pf

The Federal Police of Brazil (Portuguese: Polícia Federal do Brasil) or Department of Federal Police (Portuguese: Departamento de Polícia Federal) is a federal law enforcement agency of Brazil and one of the most well-known nationwide police forces of the executive branch of Brazil. The other nationwide police forces are the Federal Highway Police, the Federal Prisons Police (Polícia Penal Federal) and the police of the capital, Brasília, which is also organized and maintained by the federal government. In addition, Brazil has the Federal Legislative Police (Polícia Legislativa Federal), the Federal Prosecutor’s Office Police (Polícia do MPU) and the Judicial Police of the Federal Judiciary. From 1944 to 1967 it was called the Federal Public Safety Department (Portuguese: Departamento Federal de Segurança Pública).

The Federal Police Department is responsible for combating crimes against federal institutions, international drug trafficking, terrorism, cyber-crime, organized crime, public corruption, white-collar crime, money laundering, immigration, border control, airport security and maritime policing. It is subordinate to the Ministry of Justice and Public Security.

== Legal authority ==
The DPF's mandate was established in the first paragraph of the Article 144 of the Brazilian Constitution, which assigns it the following roles:

1. To investigate criminal offenses against political and social order, or against goods, services and interests of Brazilian federal government, its organs and companies, as well as interstate and international crime in a need of uniform repression in Brazil;
2. To prevent and repress smuggling and drug trafficking;
3. To be Brazil's maritime police, air transport enforcement agency, immigration agency and border patrol;
4. To combat federal and interstate crime.

Other federal statutes give the Federal Police the authority and responsibility to:

- Prevent and combat terrorism;
- Ensure the safety of foreign heads of state and heads of international organizations when visiting Brazil;
- Investigate cyber crime;
- Represent the International Police (Interpol) in Brazil;
- Prevent and repress crime against indigenous people;
- Investigate and repress public corruption and white-collar crime;
- Investigate and repress organized crime
- Regulate, via licensing, the sale, possession, and transportation of firearms and ammunition by civilian people in Brazil;
- Prevent crimes against the environment.
- Manage the national database of criminal's genetic profiles;
- Prevent and process the violation of human rights and civil rights;
- Investigate and repress money laundering;
- Assist the other Brazilian's police on investigations, when requested
- Run a witness protection program

== History ==
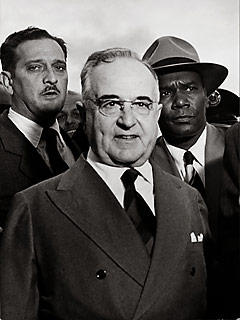
The former President of Brazil, Getúlio Vargas, and his personal guard from the DFSP

On 28 March 1944, the Police Department of the Federal District in Rio de Janeiro was transformed into the "Departamento Federal de Segurança Pública" (Federal Department of Public Safety), or DFSP. The aim was to create a police with jurisdiction in the whole country, not just in its original state. Despite its name change, initially the DFSP only served in the Federal District, but acted at the national level as the maritime police.

In the first half of 1946, the DFSP was given national jurisdiction, especially in cases of the illegal narcotics trade and crimes against public faith, and in the interest of national finance. However, a new constitution drafted on September 18 gave states the power to meet their needs of government and administration.

When the federal capital moved in 1960, the DFSP moved to Brasília, providing Guanabara State with their public security services and personnel. Due to a shortage of staff, the DFSP had to be restructured, merging its staff with another local security agency from Brasilia, called the Special Guard of Brasilia (GEB). Afterwards, the DFSP improved its structure to mimic the model of the United States FBI and police forces in England and Canada, as well as to expand operations throughout the whole Brazilian territory. Also in 1967, the new Brazilian Constitution changed the agency name to Departamento de Policia Federal (Department of Federal Police) through art.210 of Decree-Law No. 200 of February 25, 1967. As a federal investigation agency, the idea after the 1960s was to mold the Federal Police into the shape and effectiveness of the American FBI. In 1996, all positions in the Federal Police came to require a bachelor's degree.

== Organization ==
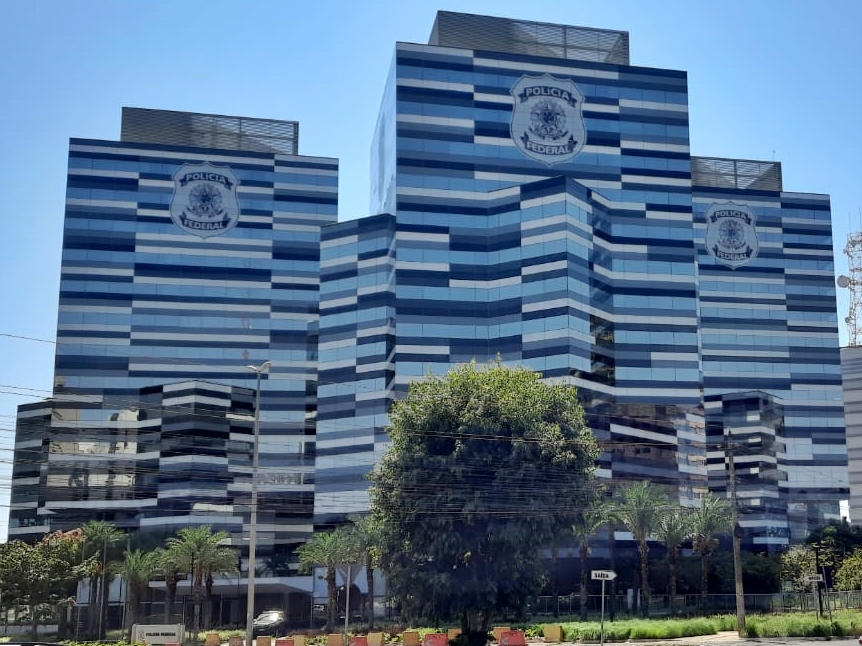
New headquarters of the Federal Police of Brazil in Brasília

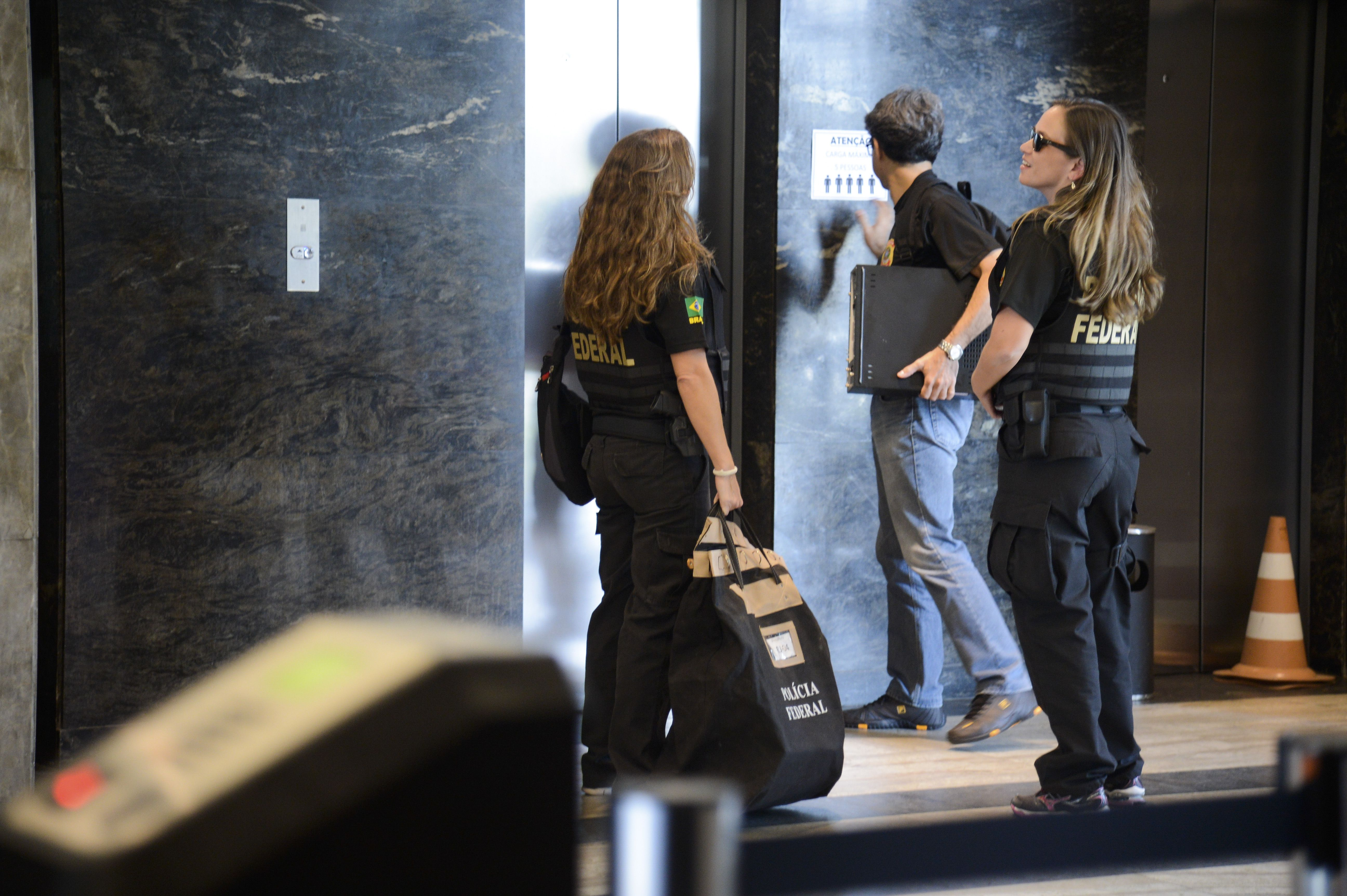
Federal Police Agents in operation

With an area of expertise that covers all national territory, the Federal Police adopts a structure similar to that of the state Civil Police forces throughout the country, but with an administrative structure that allows planning, coordination and centralized control with decentralized execution. Integration with the other federal and state government agencies on a routine basis occur through formal requests, but eventually there is a high level of coordination. The Director-General provides accounting and technical support agencies in Brasília, entrusted with the tasks of planning, coordination and control.

For the operational activities, the PF has 27 regional superintendents (the office in a state capital), 95 Federal Police offices (called Delegacias), 12 border outposts, 12 maritime (or riverine) bases and 2 bases on inland waterways.

The Federal Police Commissioners command investigations, request search and arrest warrants, decide on the arrest of a criminal etc. The field investigations and operational services are performed by the Federal Agents (Agentes de Polícia Federal). The agency also has Forensic specialists (Peritos Criminais Federais), Notary Agents (Escrivães de Polícia Federal) and fingerprints specialists (Papiloscopistas Policiais Federais). A bachelor's degree is required for candidates to apply for any position in Federal Police. Commissioners must have a law degree and also at least three years of legal practice. No previous police experience is required for any jobs. Candidates applying for a position as Federal Agent, Notary Agent and Fingerprints specialist, are required to have a bachelor's degree in any area. Candidates applying for Forensics specialists should have specific degrees, depending on their area of expertise, such as Civil Engineering, Veterinary, Accounting and Chemistry degrees.

Admission tests for the Federal Police have one of the highest candidates per spot ratio in the country.

== Tactical Operations Command ==
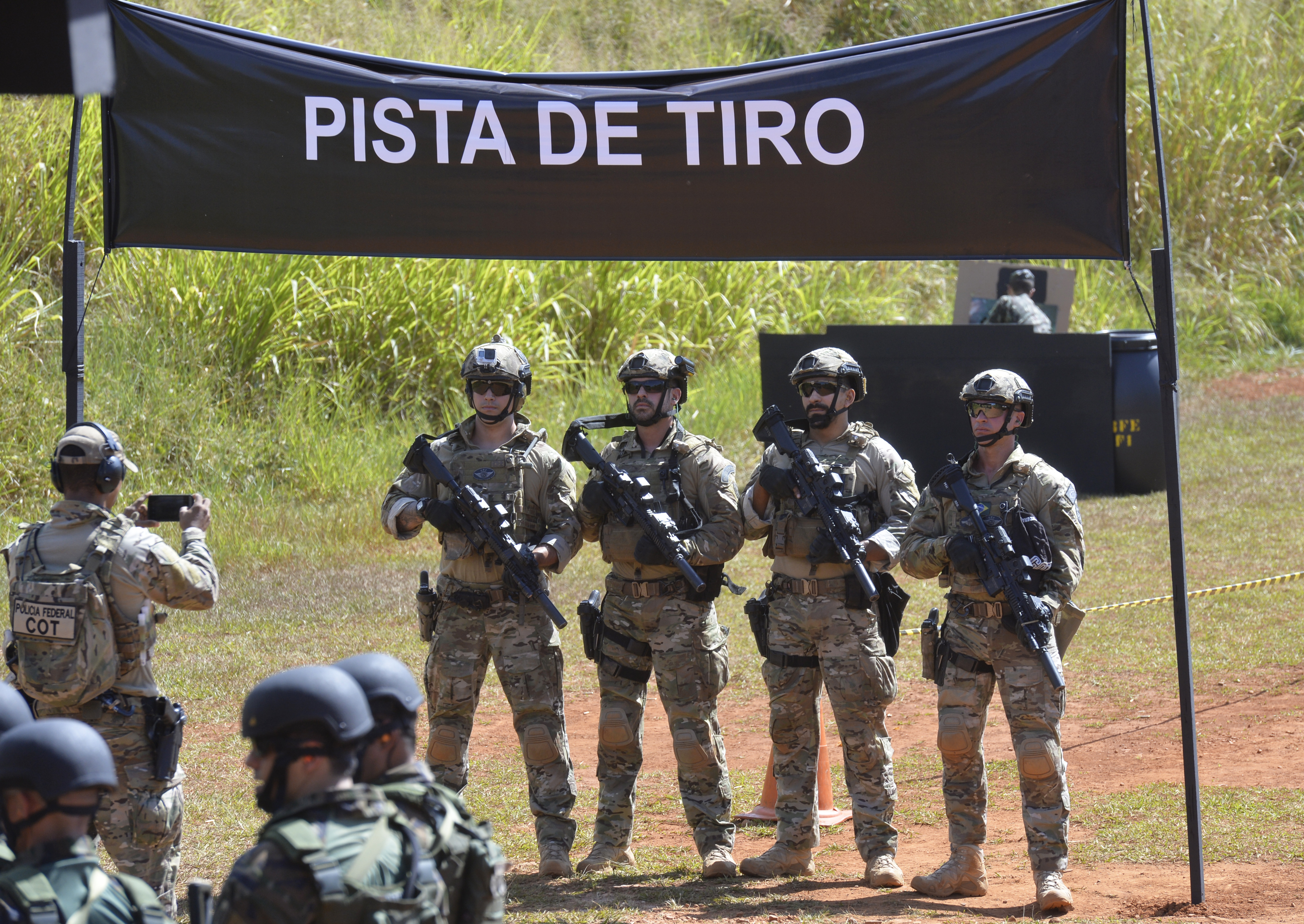
Members of the COT during an anti-terrorism exercise

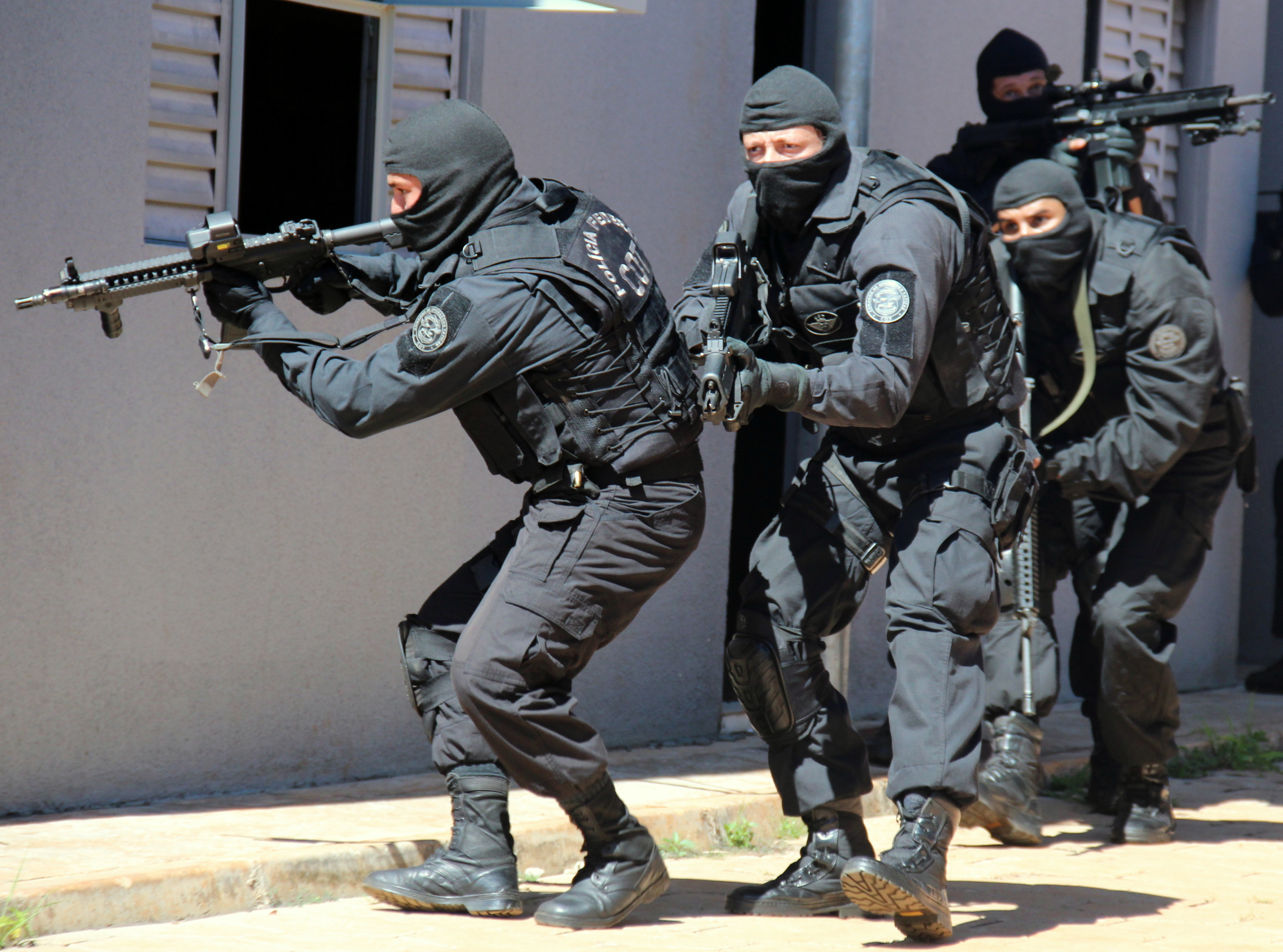
Field agents of the Federal Police's Tactical Operations Command

The Comando de Operações Táticas (COT; English: Tactical Operations Command) of the Federal Police was created in 1987 by the Ministry of Justice through the Federal Police Department – DPF with a mission of responding to terrorist attacks inside the country. To do so, its members were trained in technical and tactical units of the Special Armed Forces in Brazil and abroad – in special units in the U.S., France and Germany (especially by GSG 9). Today, this elite force for armed action plays a large range of operations.

Throughout its existence, the COT has participated in several high risk missions such as drug seizures in the country, expropriation actions, rural conflicts, VIP security, dismantling of criminal organizations, and is commonly used to escort high risk prisoners.

To belong to the COT the applicant must be in the ranks of the Federal Police. The training involving tactical and physical disciplines are practiced with the same intensity of the Training Course of the National Police Academy – ANP, including training by other specialized forces in the country, such as Rio de Janeiro's Military Police elite group called Batalhão de Operações Policiais Especiais (BOPE) specialized in urban operations.

The headquarters of the COT is in Brasília, in an area of 40 thousand square meters, located in Police Sector South, from where they send operators for missions throughout the country.

== Marine Police ==
The Special Center of Maritime Police (Núcleo Especial de Polícia Marítima – NEPOM) was created in twelve Brazilian cities in response to the high rate of crime in Brazilian ports, as well as the need to ostensibly patrol to prevent the occurrence of criminal offenses in Amazonian rivers and Brazilian borders (especially Itaipu Lake on the Brazil-Paraguay border). The maritime policing has the latest equipment, recently acquired by the Brazilian government in order to meet the country to the ISPS Code standards (International Ship and Port Facility Security Code). In addition to the routine patrolling, surveillance is carried out in the international traffic in dozens of ships docking and undocking in major Brazilian ports. Agents of action is also taken around the clandestine coming on board vessels. The Nepom the police receive special training in the Navy of Brazil, and is enabled in the category of Crew of State vessel.

== Operational Aviation Coordination ==
The CAOP (Coordenação de Aviação Operacional – Aviation Operational Coordination) is a unit of federal police agents, responsible for transporting policeman to anywhere in the country, besides the air support operations to the Federal Police.

Was established in 1986, because the demand for transportation to any place, quickly, and the need for air support in the actions and tactics without having to depend on the Armed Forces.

In 1995 the corporation had the name of advising operational issues when he received three aircraft, two Bell 412s and an HB-350 Squirrel. Already in 1996 the Office became the Division of Aviation Operations. In the year 1999 the unit won these assignments and in 2001 finally received the current designation of the CAOP.

The unit is divided into two squadrons, one fixed-wing and the other rotorcraft.

Its current fleet includes:

Photo	Aircraft	Quantity	Comments
	Airbus AS350 B2 Squirrel	3	
	Airbus AS355 N Squirrel	2	
	Bell 412	2	
	AgustaWestland AW139	2	
	Embraer ERJ-145	2	PR-DPF & PR-PFN
	Embraer ERJ-175	2	PS-DPF & PS-CAV ex Flybe Leasing
	Cessna C-208B Grand Caravan	2	
	Beech King Air 350i	1	
	IAI Heron	3	

== Equipment ==
Model	Type	Origin
Glock 17	Semi-automatic pistol	Austria
Glock 19	Semi-automatic pistol	Austria
Glock 22	Semi-automatic pistol	Austria
Glock 26	Semi-automatic pistol	Austria
SIG Sauer P320	Semi-automatic pistol	United States
Heckler & Koch MP5	Submachine gun	Germany
Colt M4A1	Assault rifle	United States
Bushmaster XM-15	Assault rifle	United States
HK G36K	Assault rifle	Germany
HK416	Assault rifle	Germany
SG 550	Assault rifle	Switzerland
HK417	Battle rifle	Germany
Blaser R93 Tactical	Sniper rifle	Germany
FN MAG	Machine gun	Belgium

== Vehicles ==
Name	Origin	Type	Quantity	Photo
Sherpa Light	France	Armored vehicle	3	
STREIT Scorpion	United Arab Emirates/Canada	Armored vehicle	8	

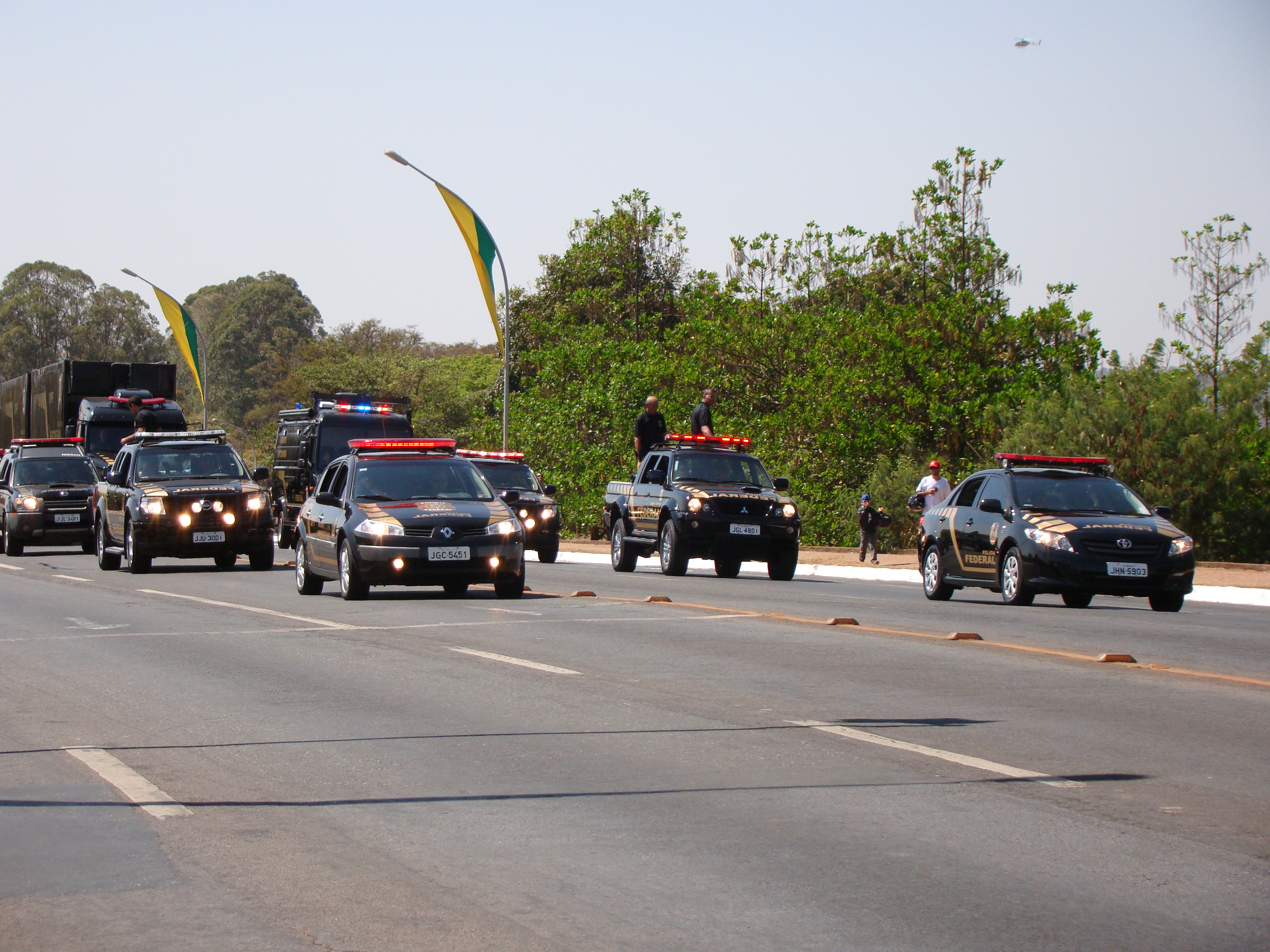
Independence Day parade

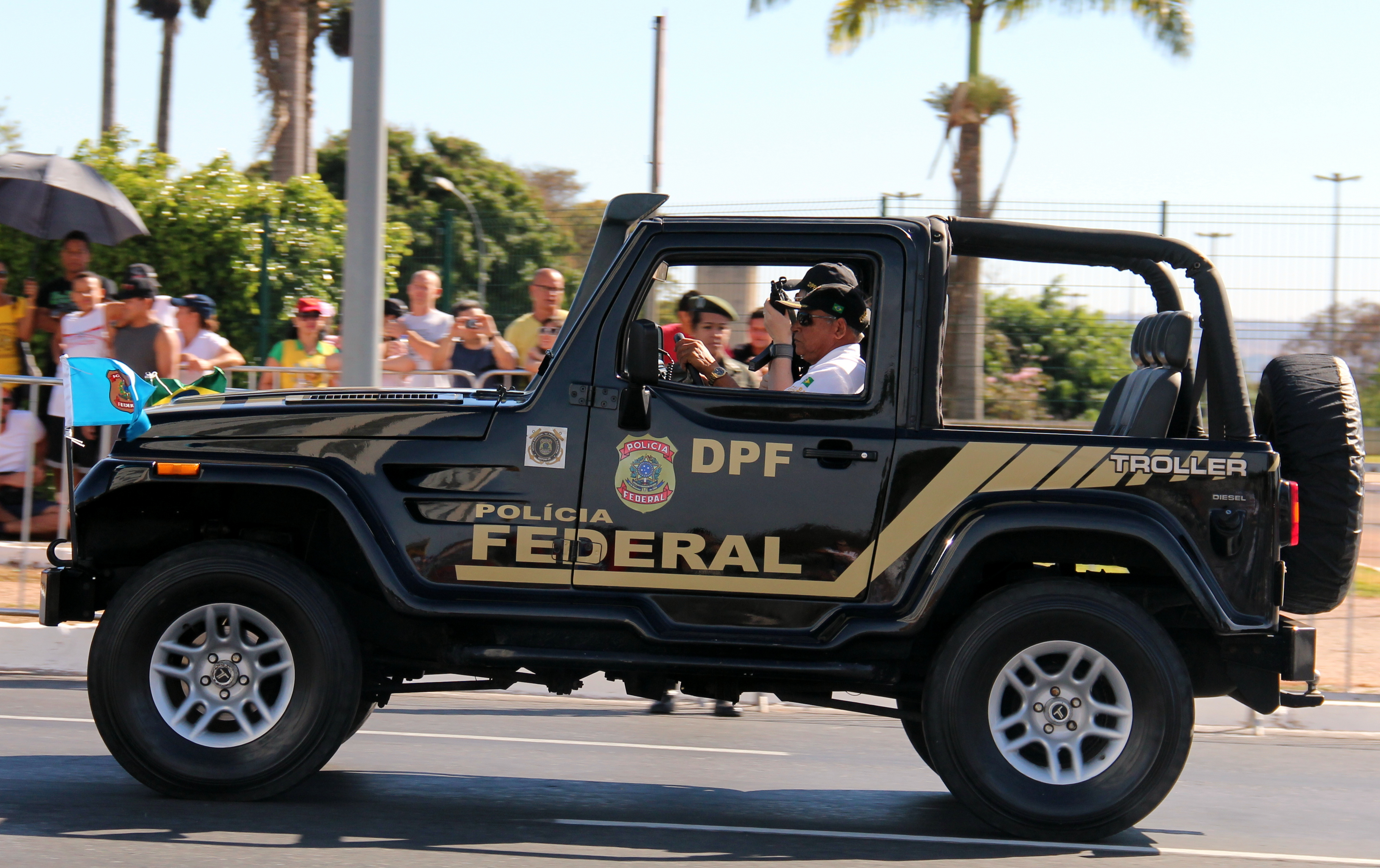
Troller PF

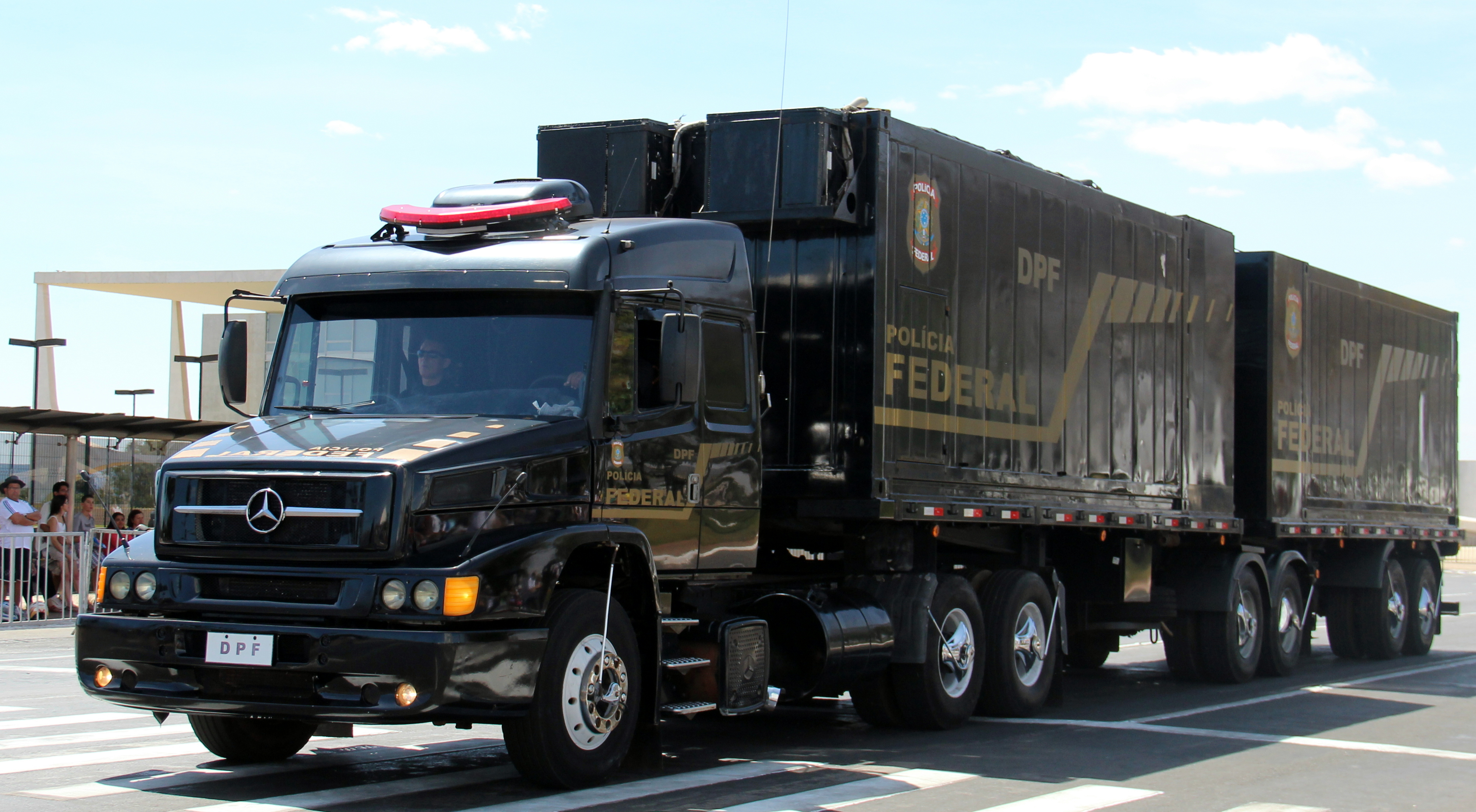
Truck PF

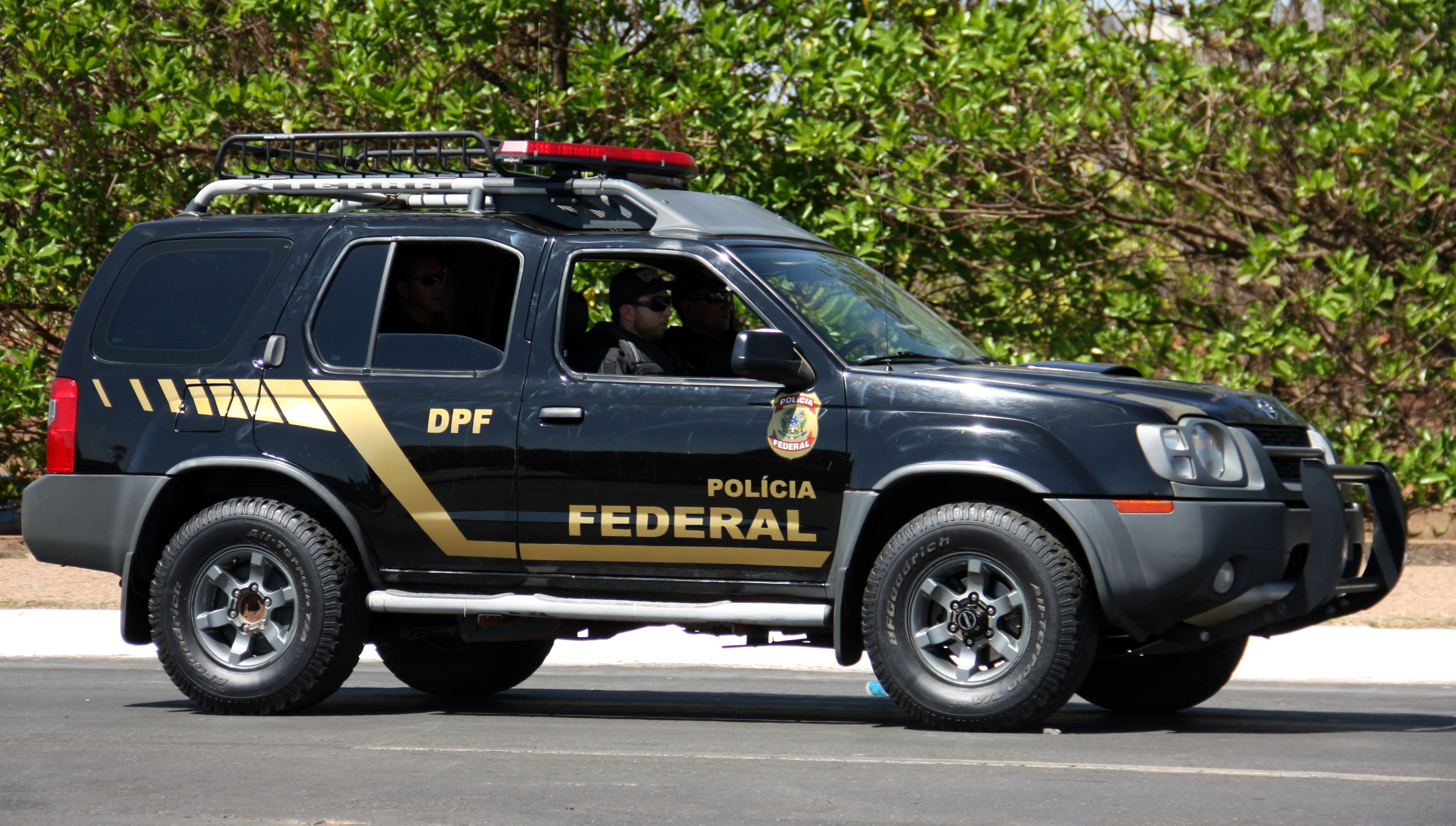
Nissan Xterra

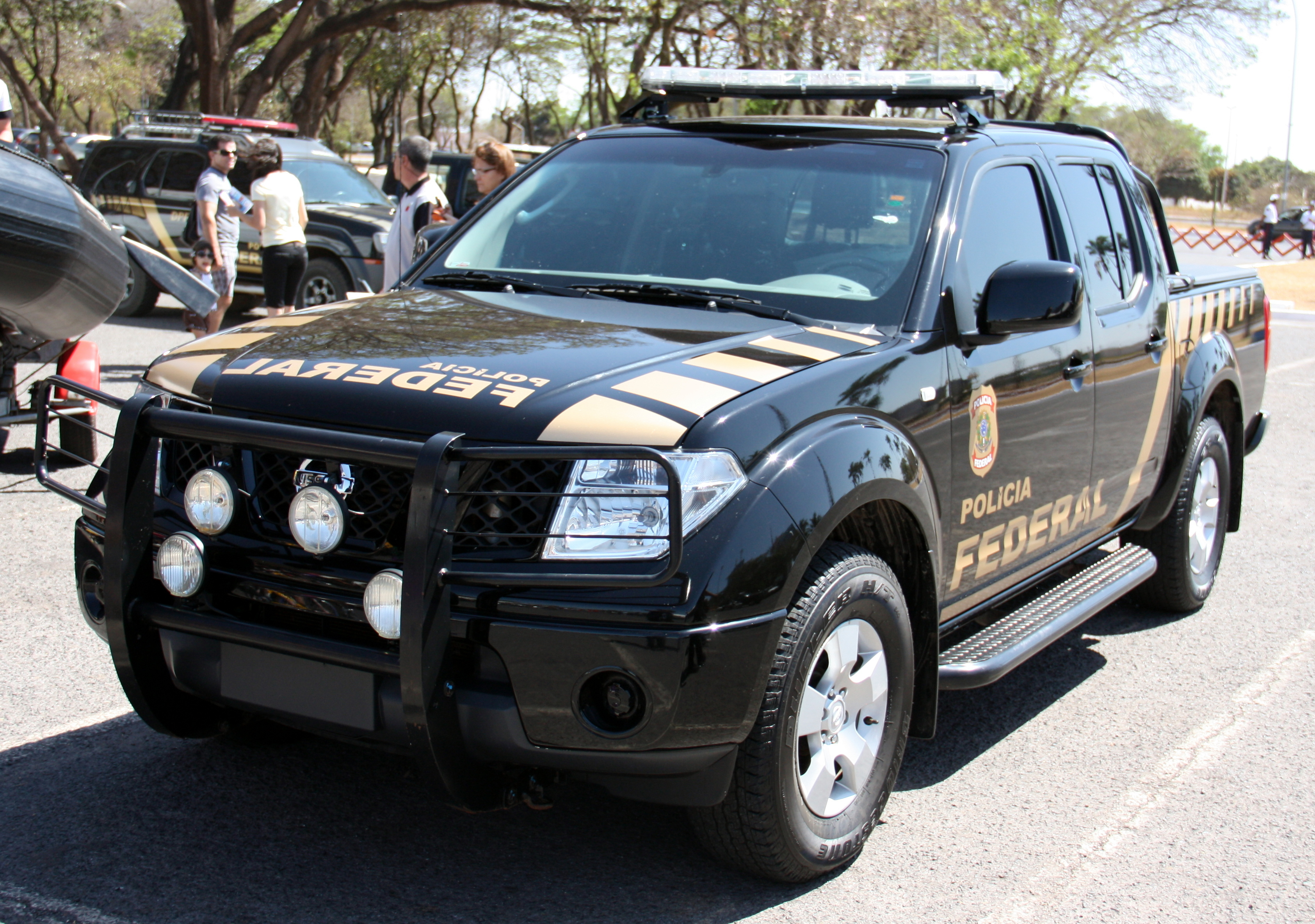
Nissan Frontier

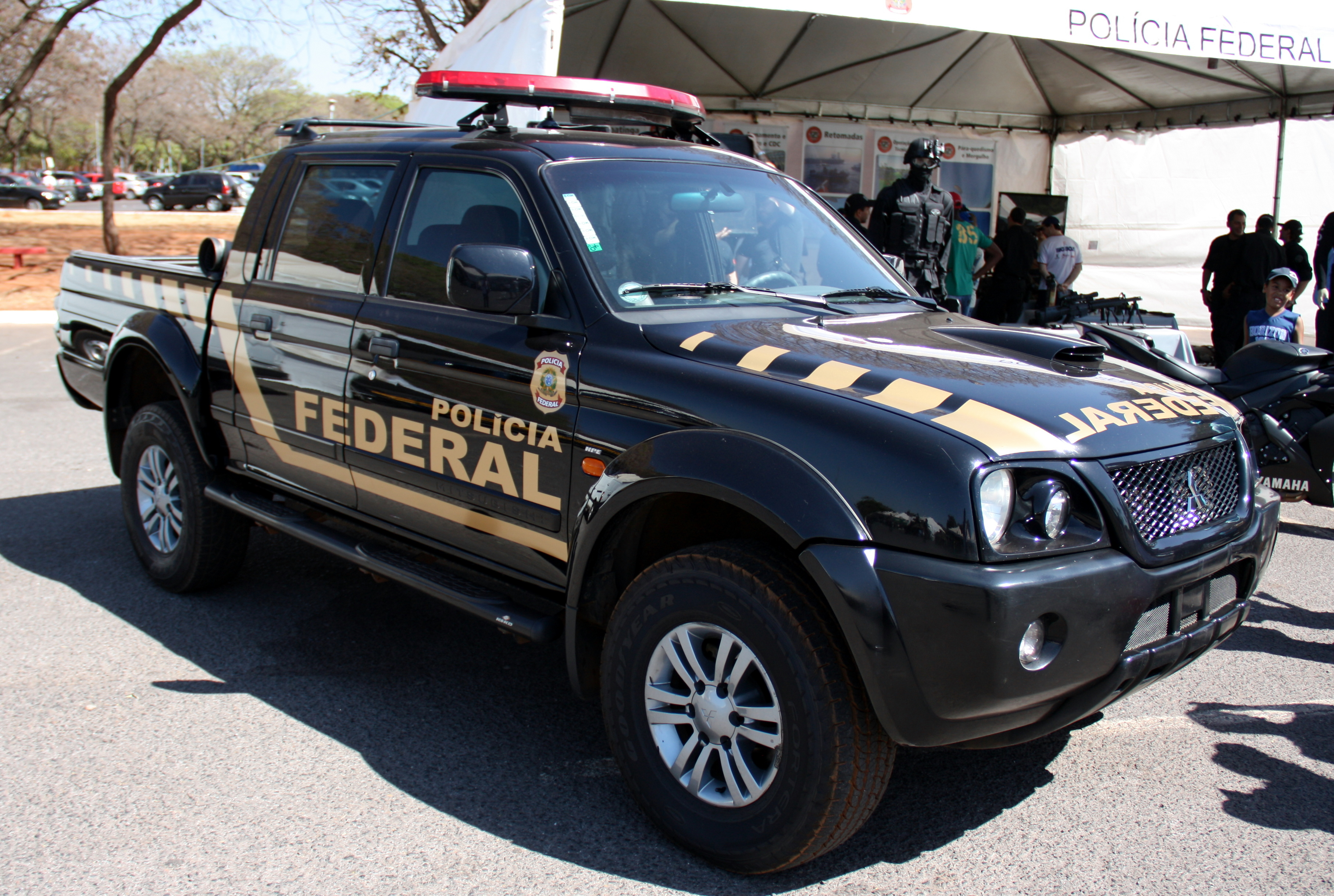
Mitsubishi L200

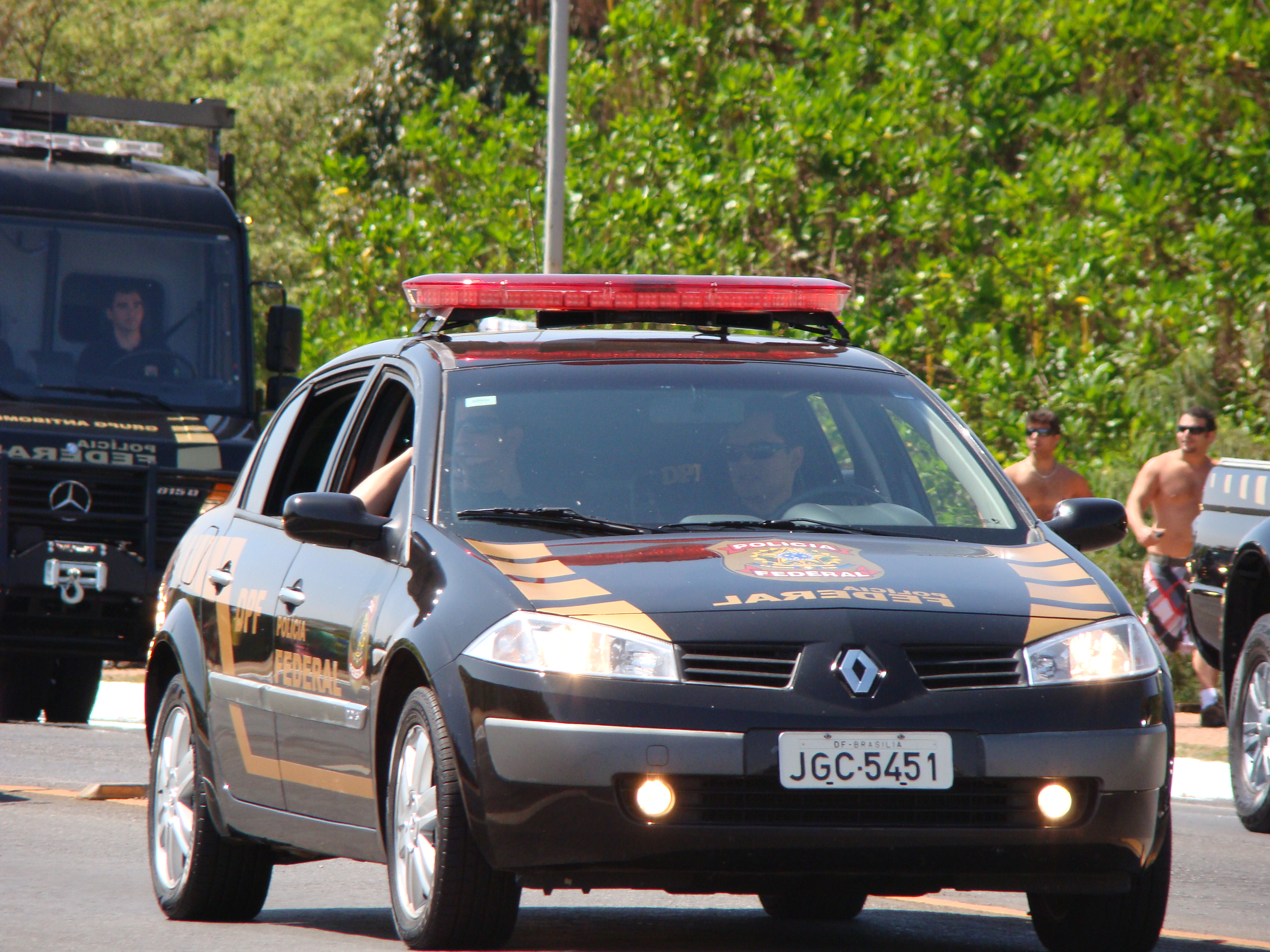
Renault Mégane

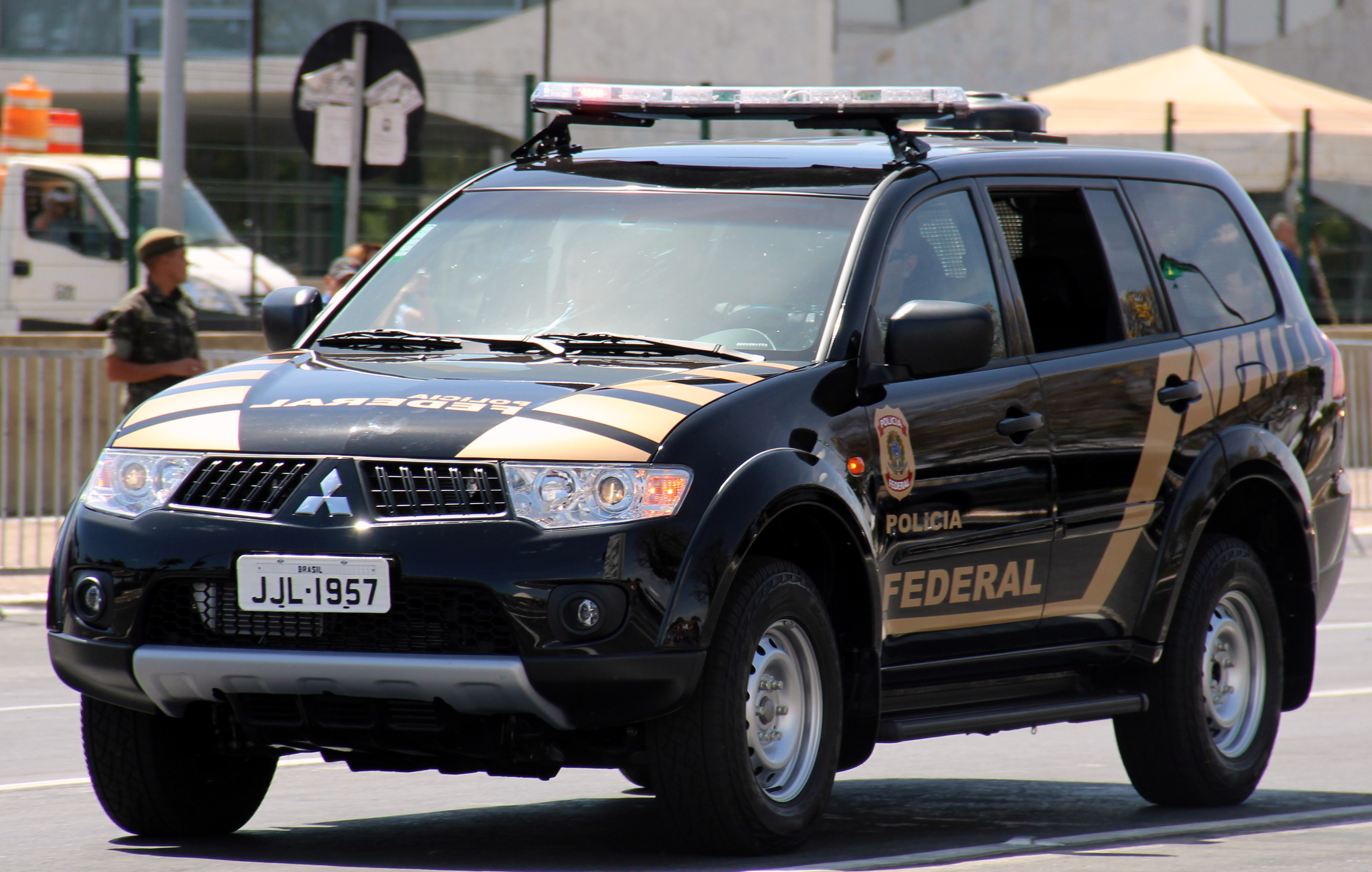
Mitsubishi Pajero

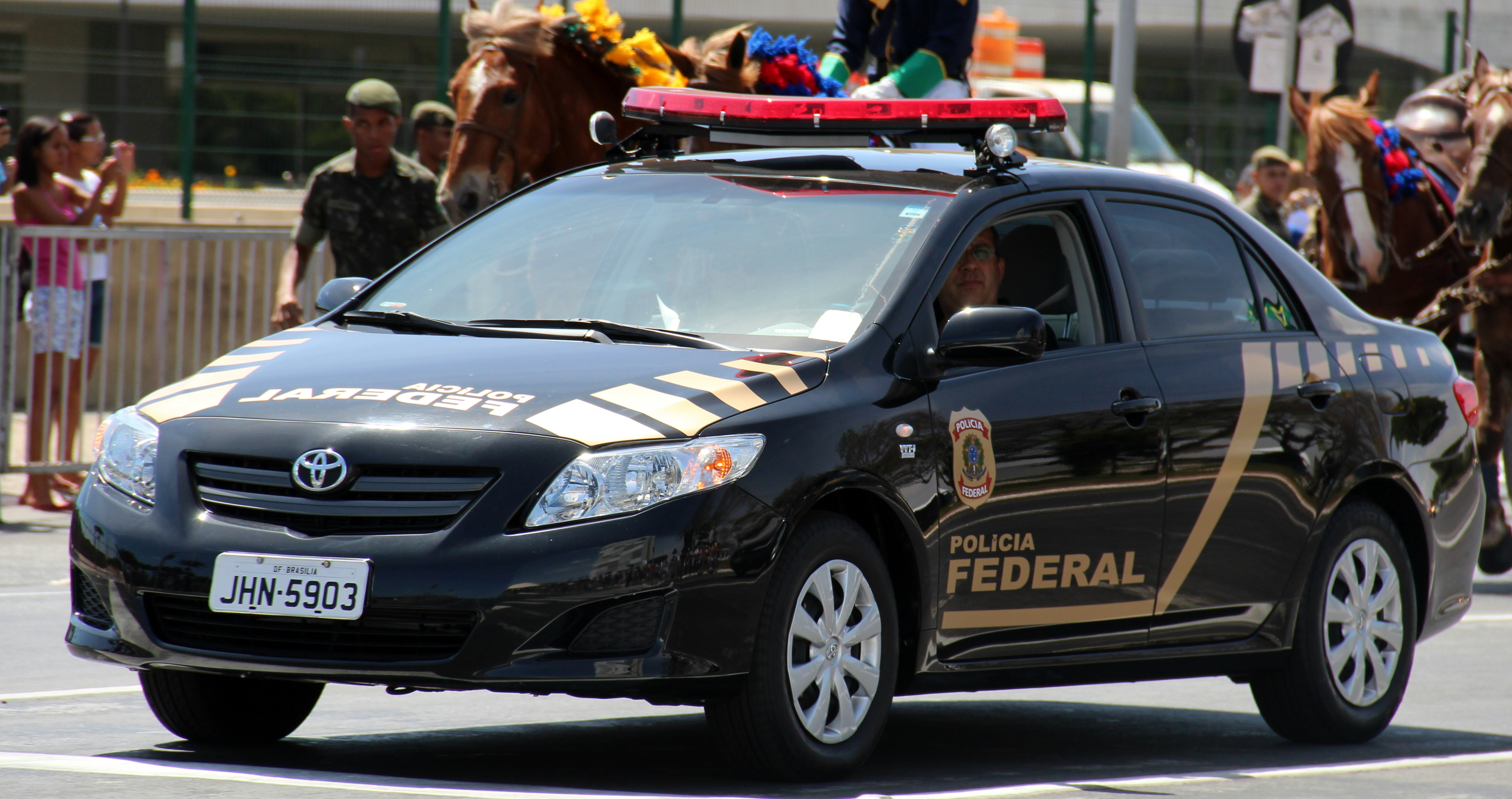
Toyota Corolla

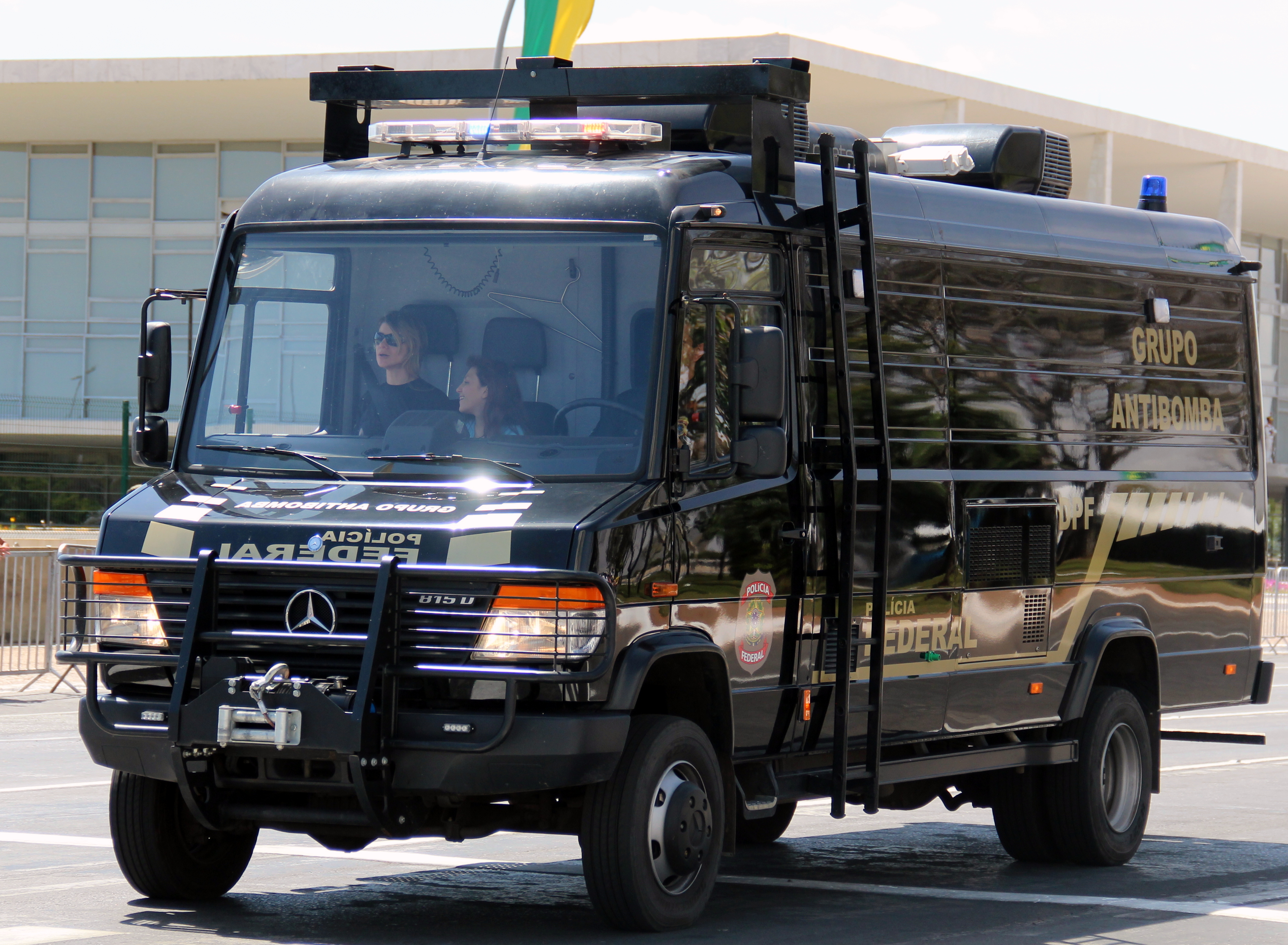
Mercedes-Benz Vario

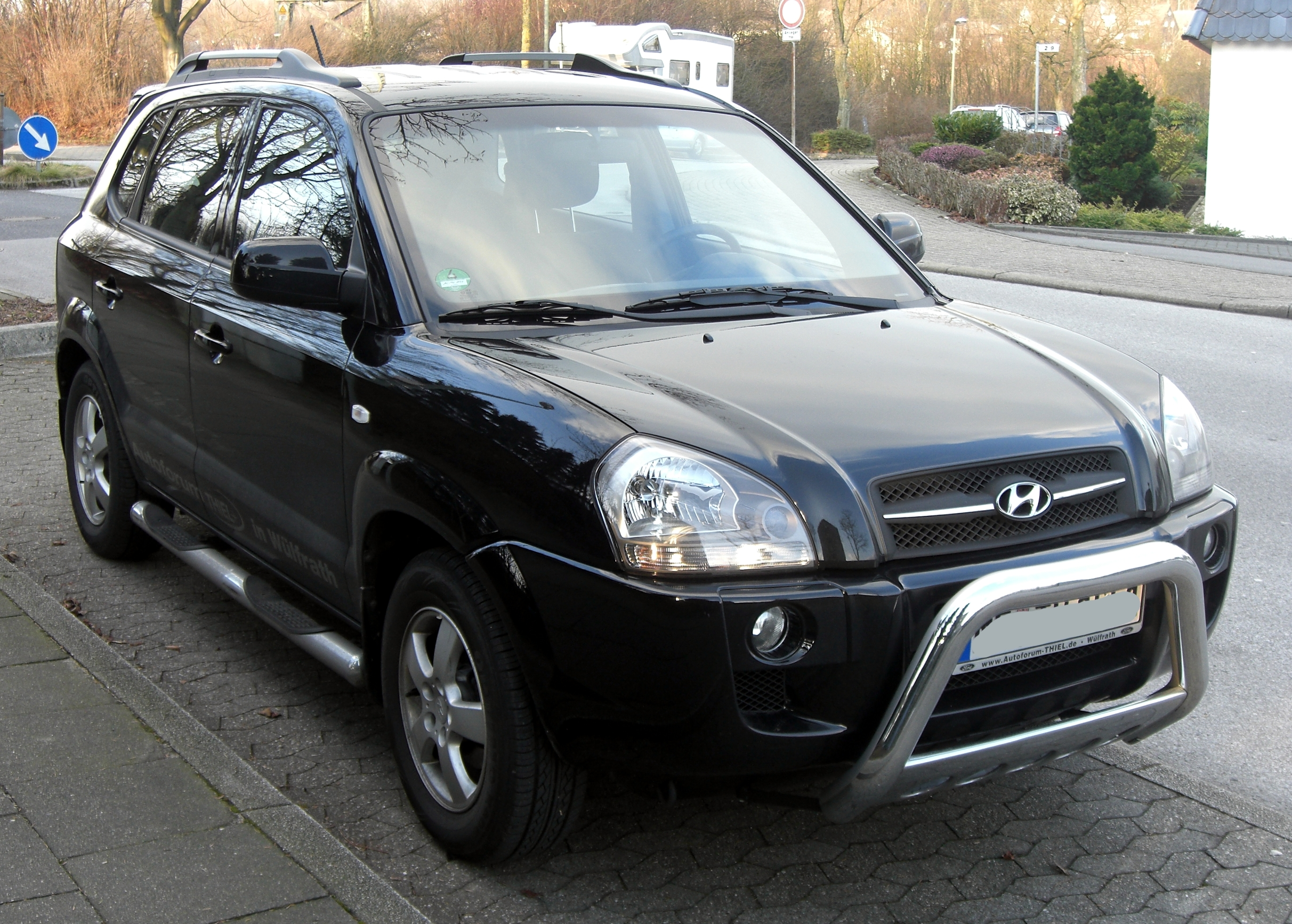
Hyundai Tucson

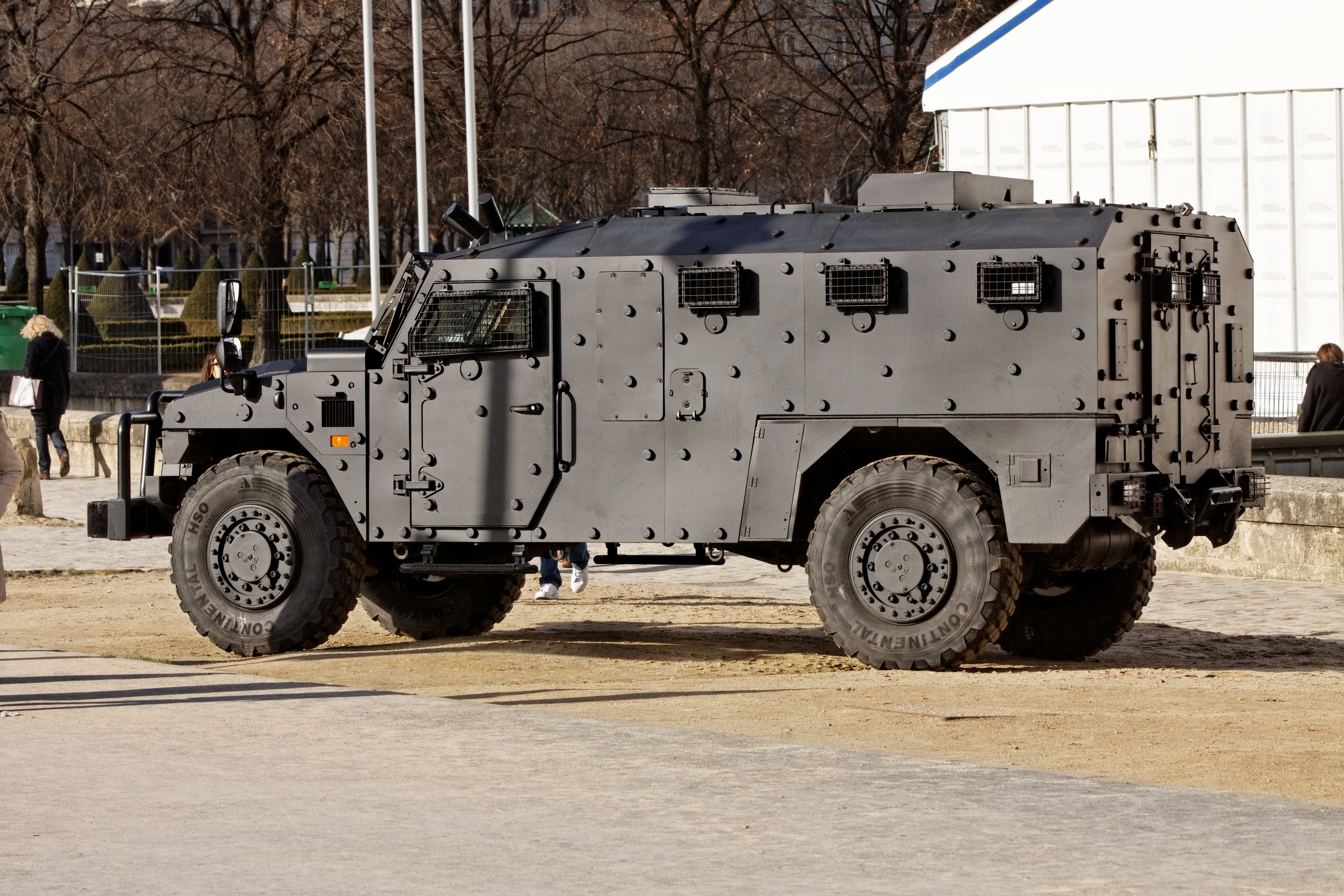
Sherpa Light

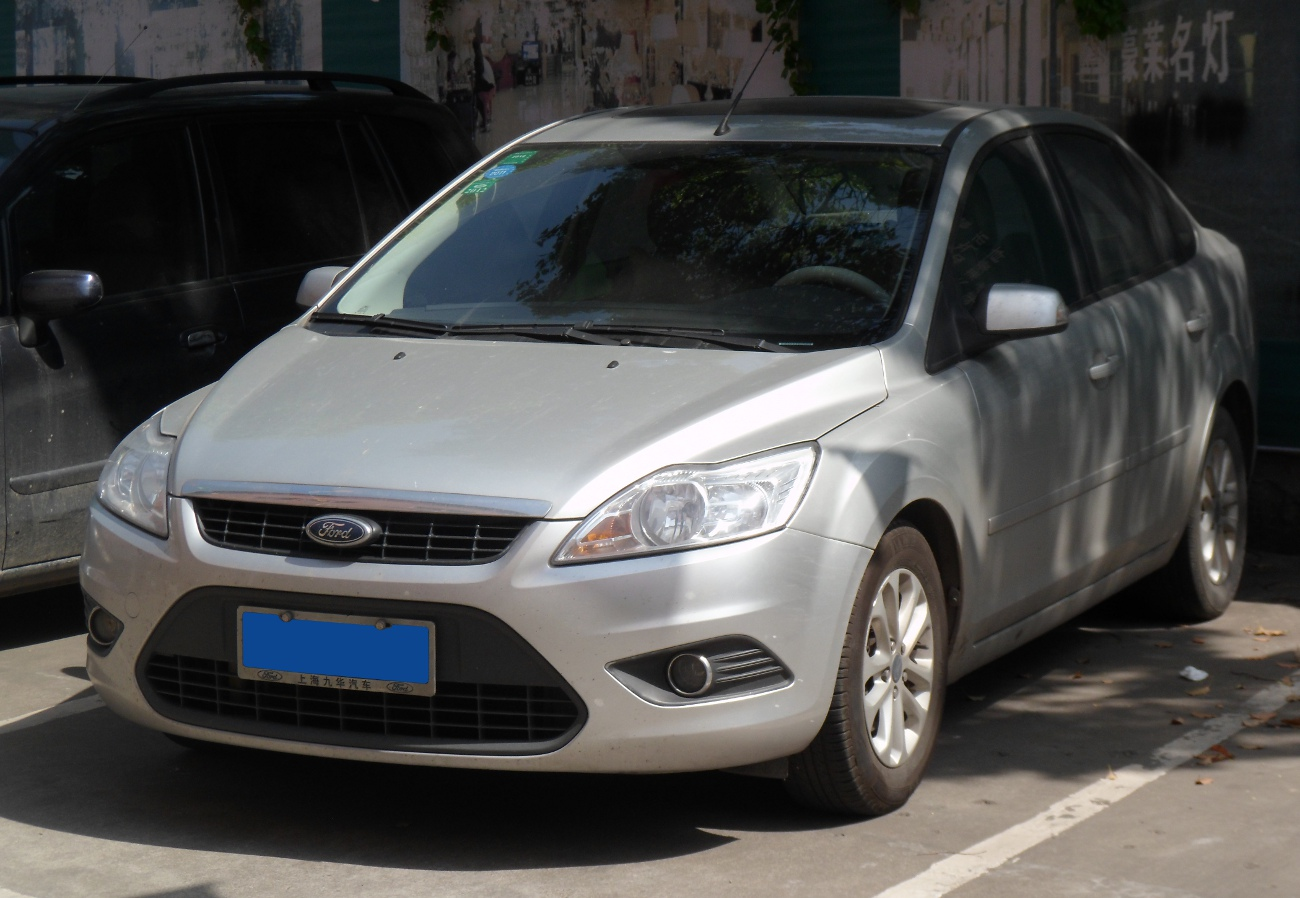
Ford Focus

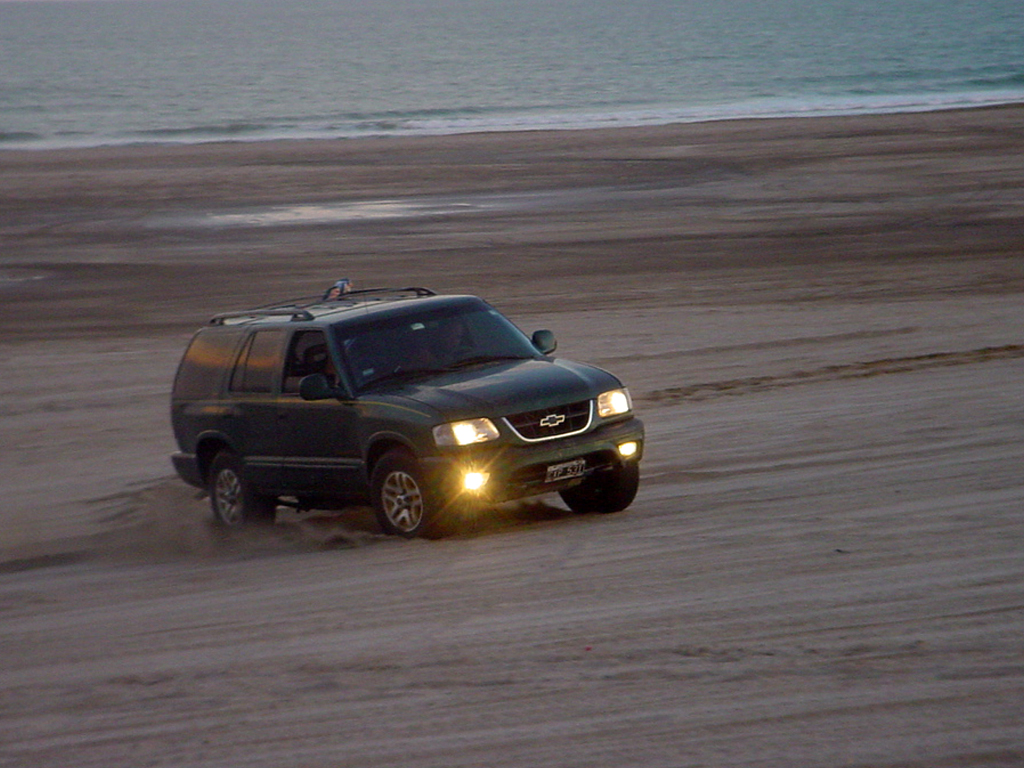
Chevrolet Blazer

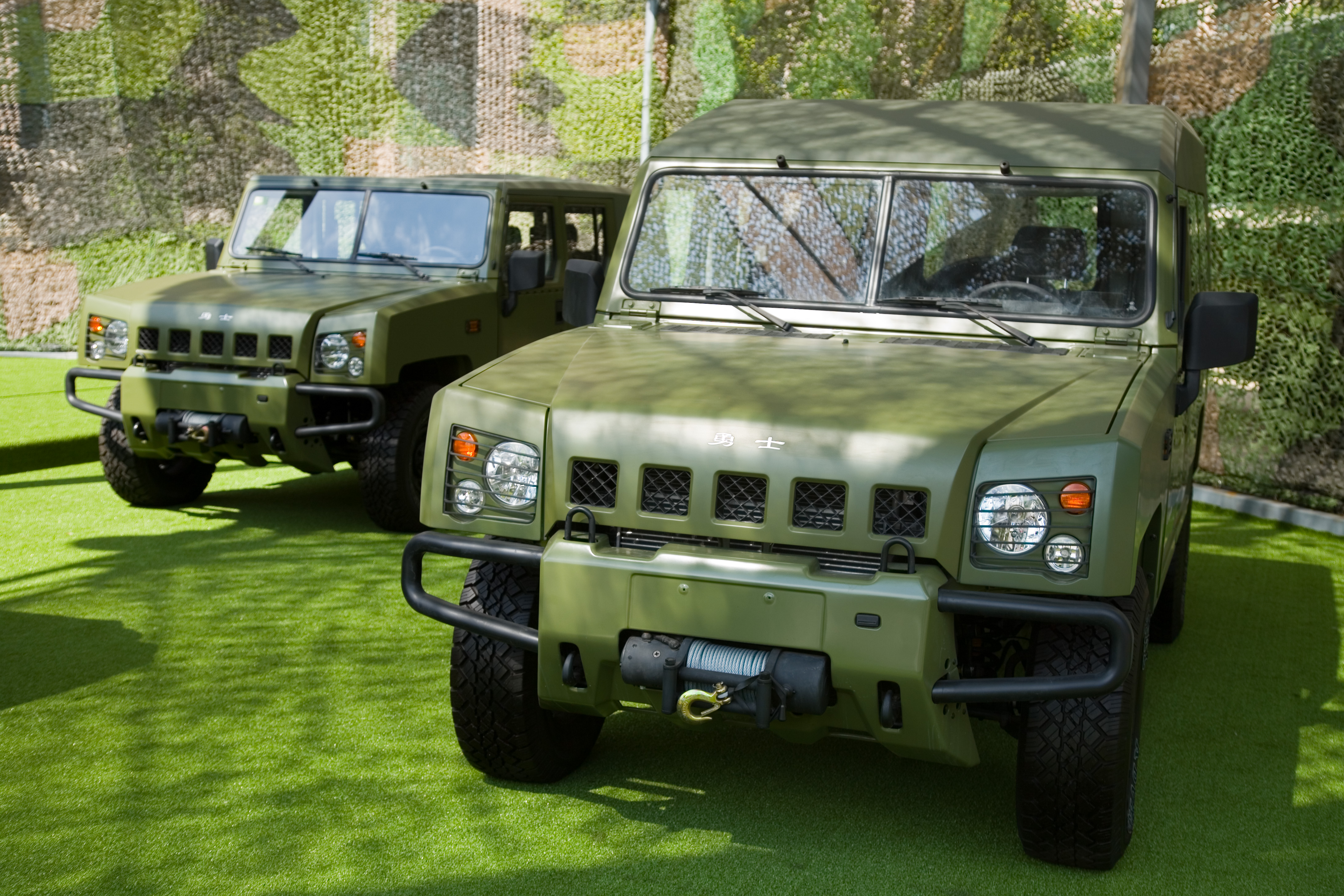
BJ2022

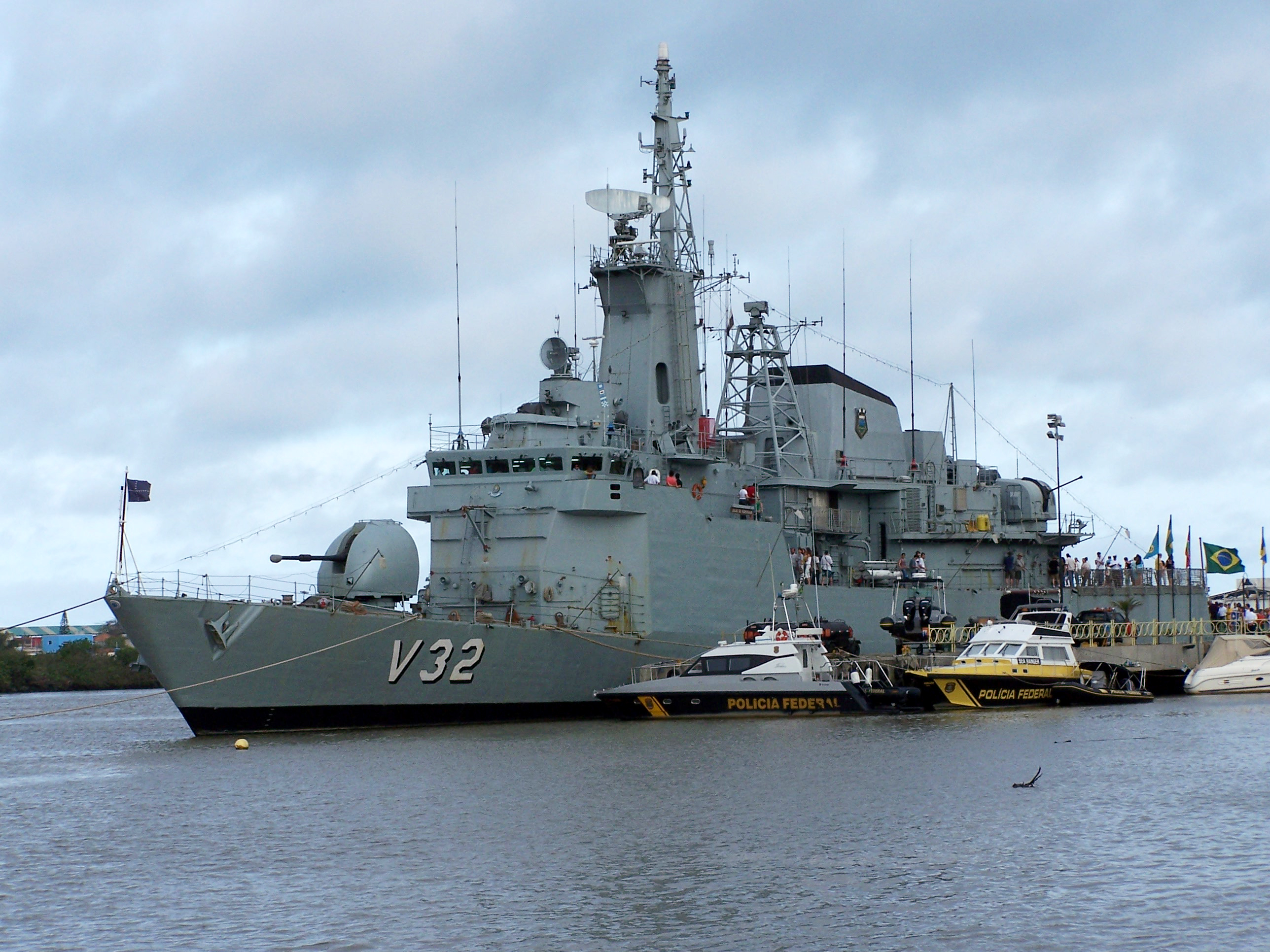
Two Federal Police patrol boats alongside the Brazilian Naval ship Júlio de Noronha

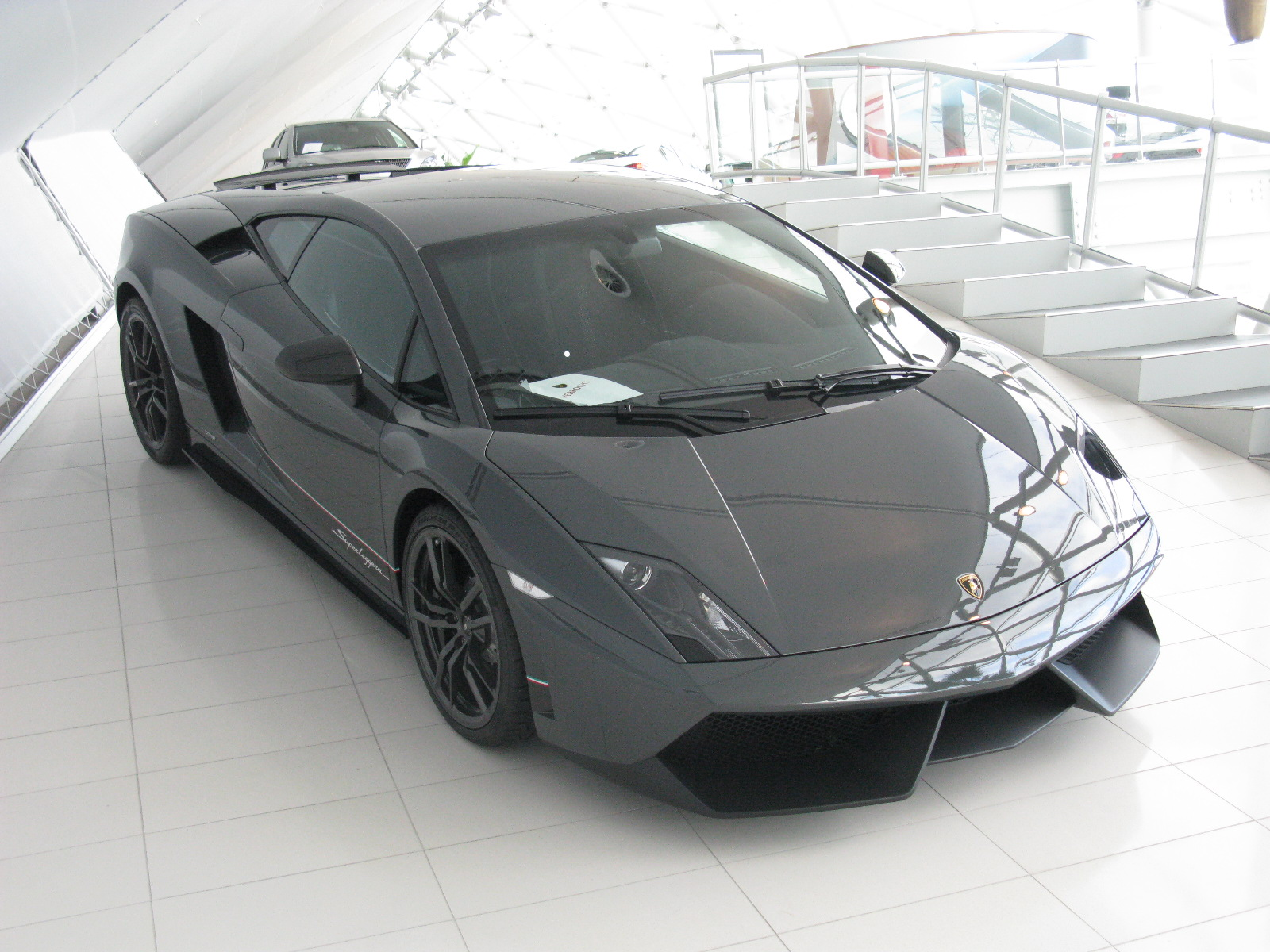
Lamborghini Gallardo

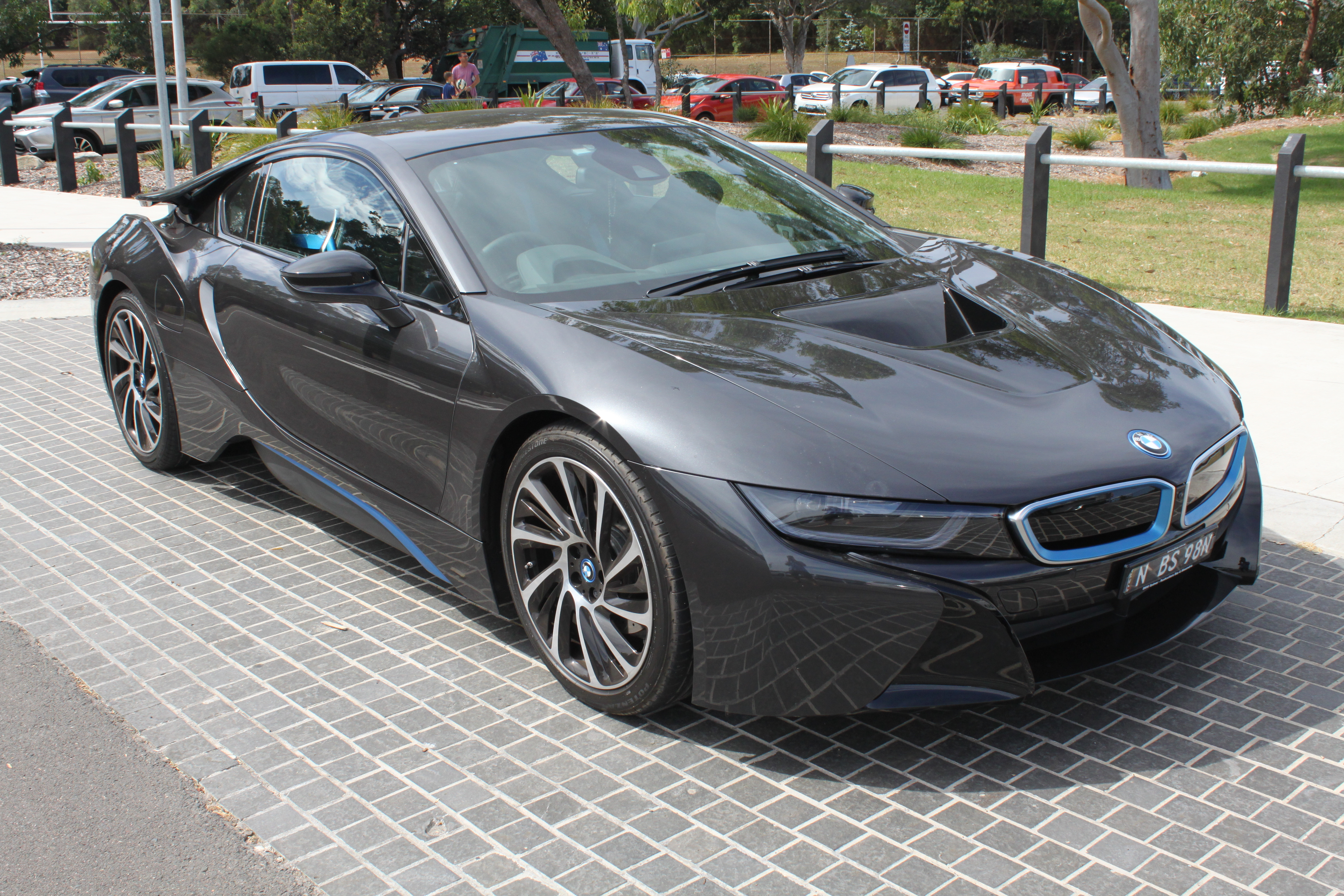
BMW i8 in Tocantins

== See also ==
- National Prison Department
- Military Police of Brazilian States
- Military Police of São Paulo State
- Military Police of Rio de Janeiro State
- Law enforcement in Brazil
- Federal Highway Police (Brazil)
- Civil Police of Brazilian States
- Batalhão de Operações Policiais Especiais (BOPE)
- Civil Police of Rio de Janeiro State

== Notes ==
This article incorporates text from this source, which is in the public domain. Country Studies. Federal Research Division.
