= Prison Department =

Prison Department may refer to:

- Department of Prisons (Sri Lanka)
- Malaysian Prison Department
- National Prison Department (Brazil)
- Prison Department, Scotland
