= Blaser R93 Tactical =

Blaser R93 LRS2
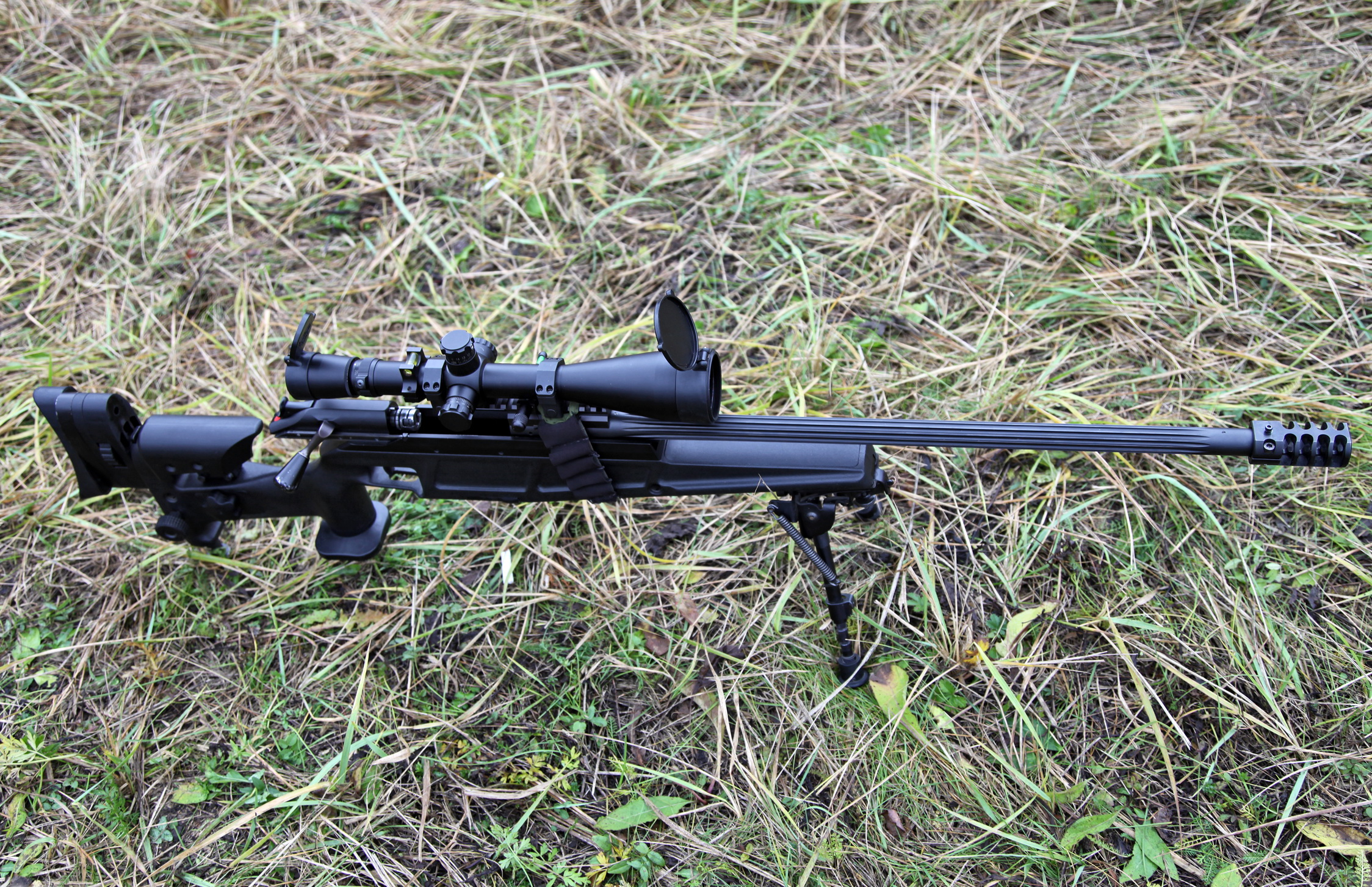
- Blaser R93 LRS2 .308 Winchester
- Type: Sniper rifle
- Place of origin: Germany

Service history
- Used by: See Users

Production history
- Designed: 1993
- Manufacturer: Blaser
- Produced: 1993–2017
- No. built: 200,000+
- Variants: Blaser LRT; Blaser LRS 2 Blaser Tactical 2

Specifications
- Mass: 5.4 kg (12 lb) (empty)(.223 Rem., .308 Win., .300 Win Mag); 5.8 kg (13 lb) (empty) (.338 Lapua Mag)
- Barrel length: 25 in (635 mm) (.223 Rem, .308 Win, .300 Win Mag); 26.3 in (668 mm) (.338 Lapua)
- Caliber: 7.62×51mm NATO, .300 Winchester Magnum, .338 Lapua Magnum, 6.5×55mm
- Action: Radial locked straight-pull bolt action
- Feed system: 5-round detachable box magazine (4 for .300 Win), Original LRT 10-rounds
- Sights: detachable aperture-type iron sights or day or night optics

The Blaser R93 Tactical is a German bolt action sniper rifle, based on the Blaser R93 design. It has as variants the Blaser LRS 2 and Tactical 2. It is used by German and Dutch police forces as well as the Australian military and special police units. The rifles were manufactured by the German firearms manufacturer Blaser.

== Design ==
The LRT (Long Range Tactical), LRS 2 (Long Range Sporter 2), and Tactical 2 rifles are straight-pull bolt-action take down sniper rifles. The straight-pull action design was introduced in the Blaser R93 hunting rifle line. These actions allows for faster follow-up shots compared to traditional turn bolt actions. The rifles are designed to fire small groups (sub 0.07 mrad (7 mm at 100 m; 0.25 moa) with factory match ammunition.

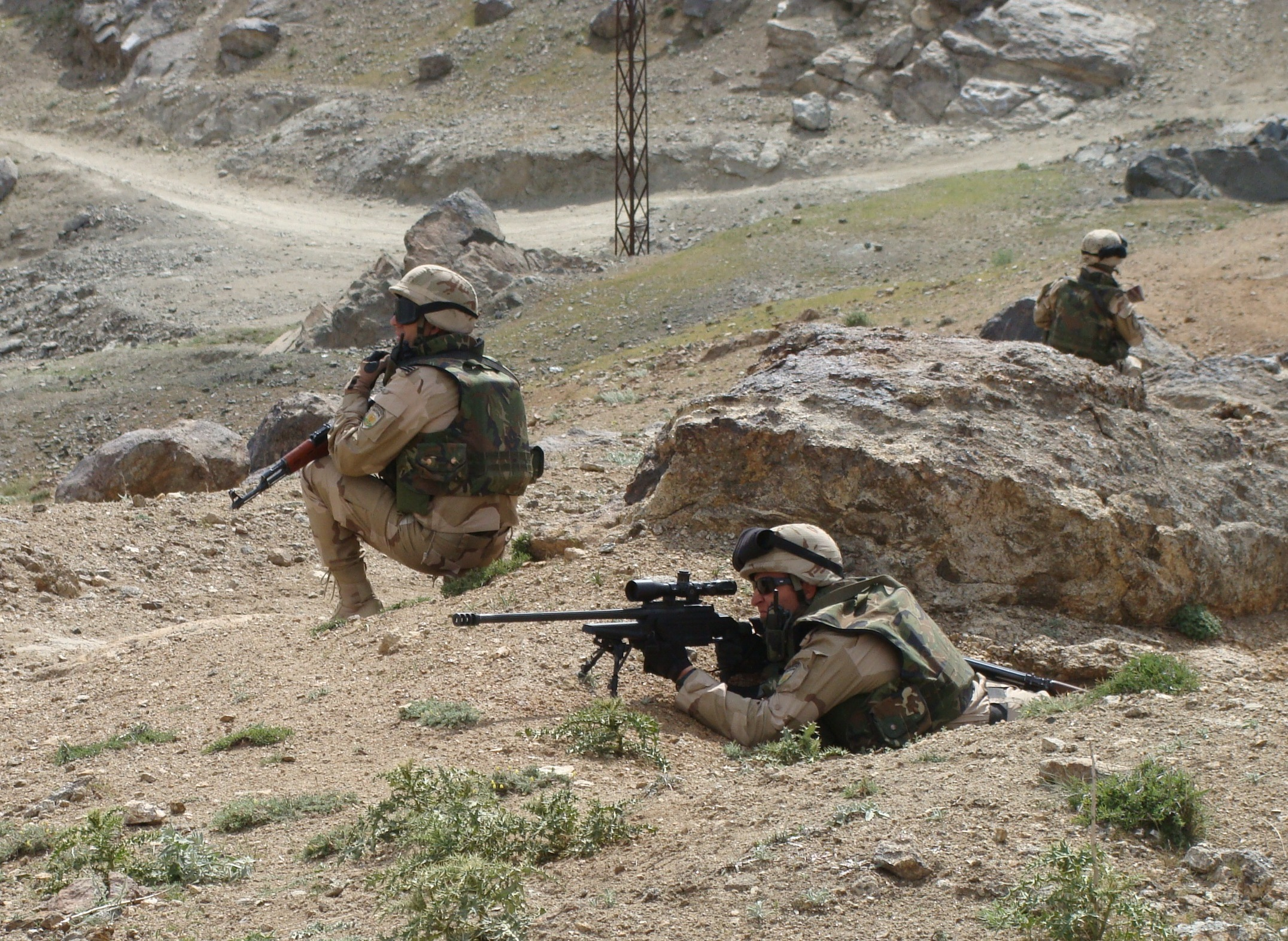
Bulgarian Army snipers.

The LRS 2 version, comes chambered in .223 Remington, 6mm Norma BR, 6.5×55mm, .308 Winchester and .300 Winchester Magnum.

An uncommon part of its design is that it is a straight-pull bolt-action rather than a turn-bolt, which allows for much faster follow-up shots. The 14-lug radial collet ensures the centering of the cartridge when fed into the chamber assisting in its accuracy. Barrel changes by an experienced person can take place in under 60 seconds.

The Tactical 1 (very low production) or 2 version is available in .223 Remington, .308 Winchester, .300 Winchester Magnum and .338 Lapua Magnum and has a larger frame, action and barrel to accommodate the use of the .338 Lapua Magnum chambering. The sight is mounted directly to the barrel as normal, however, the design allows the barrel and sight to be removed from the body of the rifle by undoing the two hex screws with a hex key accessed from under the body. This allows the rifle to be carried in a more compact fashion and can be reassembled easily in less than 30 seconds. The safety catch is mounted on the rear of the bolt and reveals a large red dot when pushed forward and up to the "fire" position. One feature of the bolt is that when unloaded and no magazine inserted, the safety has to be pushed forward slightly in order to pull the bolt back. The 5 round magazines in .308 calibre sit flush with the underside of the body when inserted.

=== Variants ===
R93 Tactical (1st gen) (1993-1997)
Synthetic body model. Also available under the designations R93 UIT made for UIT competitions (later ISSF) and R93 CISM made for CISM competitions. Detachable staggered feed double stack 10-round box magazine. Chassis and barrel compatible with the regular R93. UIT and CISM versions came with diopter sights.
R93 Tactical LRS2 (1997-2005)
Detachable box magazine, Single Stack (5-round). The 2nd gen is a ruggeriezed version, also known as Long Range Sporter 2 (LRS-2). New magazine design. Some of the different calibers may require different magazines. LRS stands for Long Range Sporter, but the model is sometimes also referred to as LRT for Long Range Tactical.
R93 Tactical LRS2 .338LM
Large chassis version to facilitate .338 Lapua Magnum.
Blaser R93 Tactical 2 (2005-)
Large chassis version, available in .223 Rem, .308 Win, .300 WinMag, .338LM.
R93 Duo Mod. Hamed
Double barreled side by side rifle made to order for Hamed bin Zayed Al Nahyan.
R93 Handgun Hunting System
An ultra short R93 with a 36 cm barrel and only a pistol grip (no buttstock).

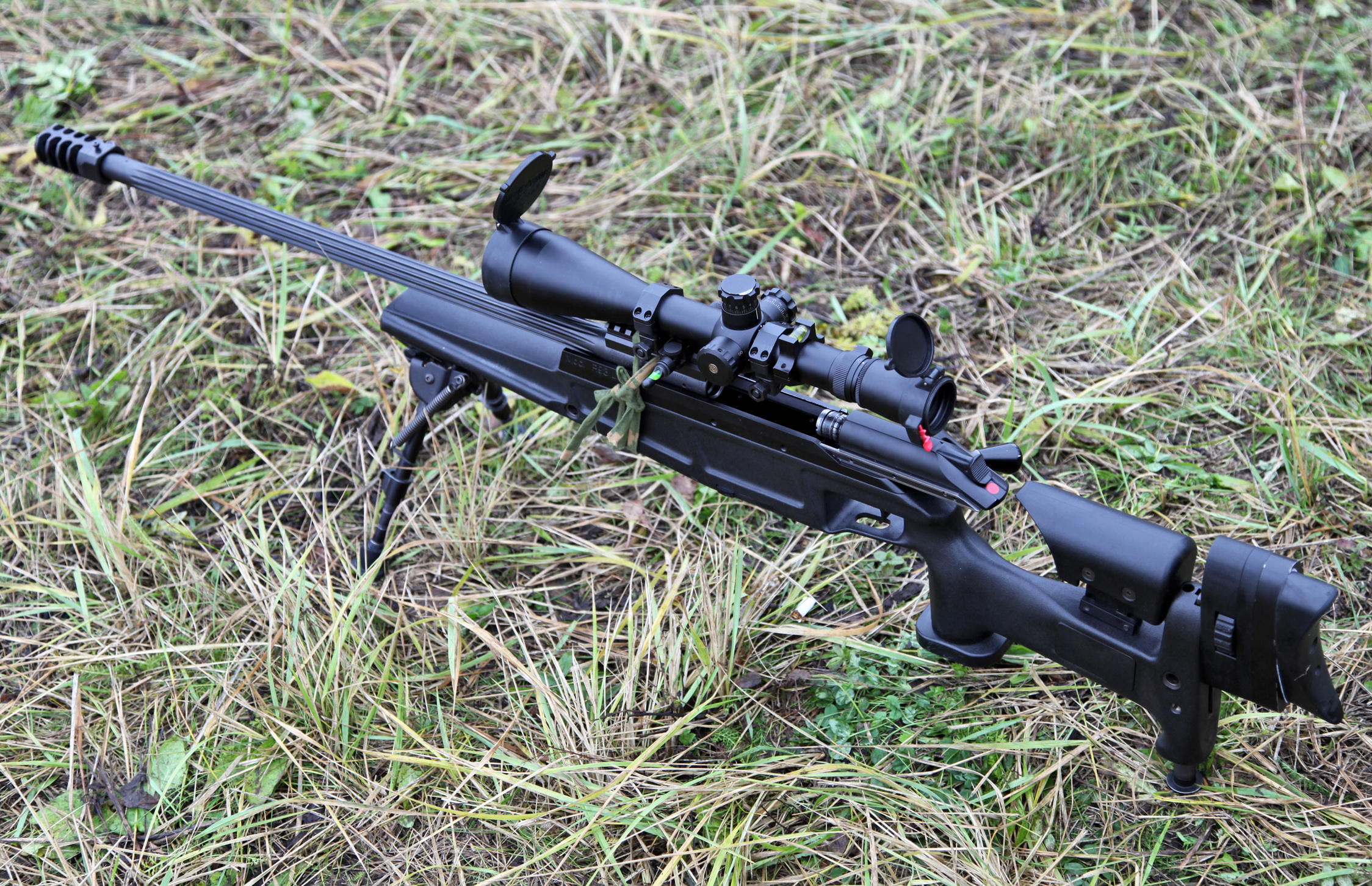

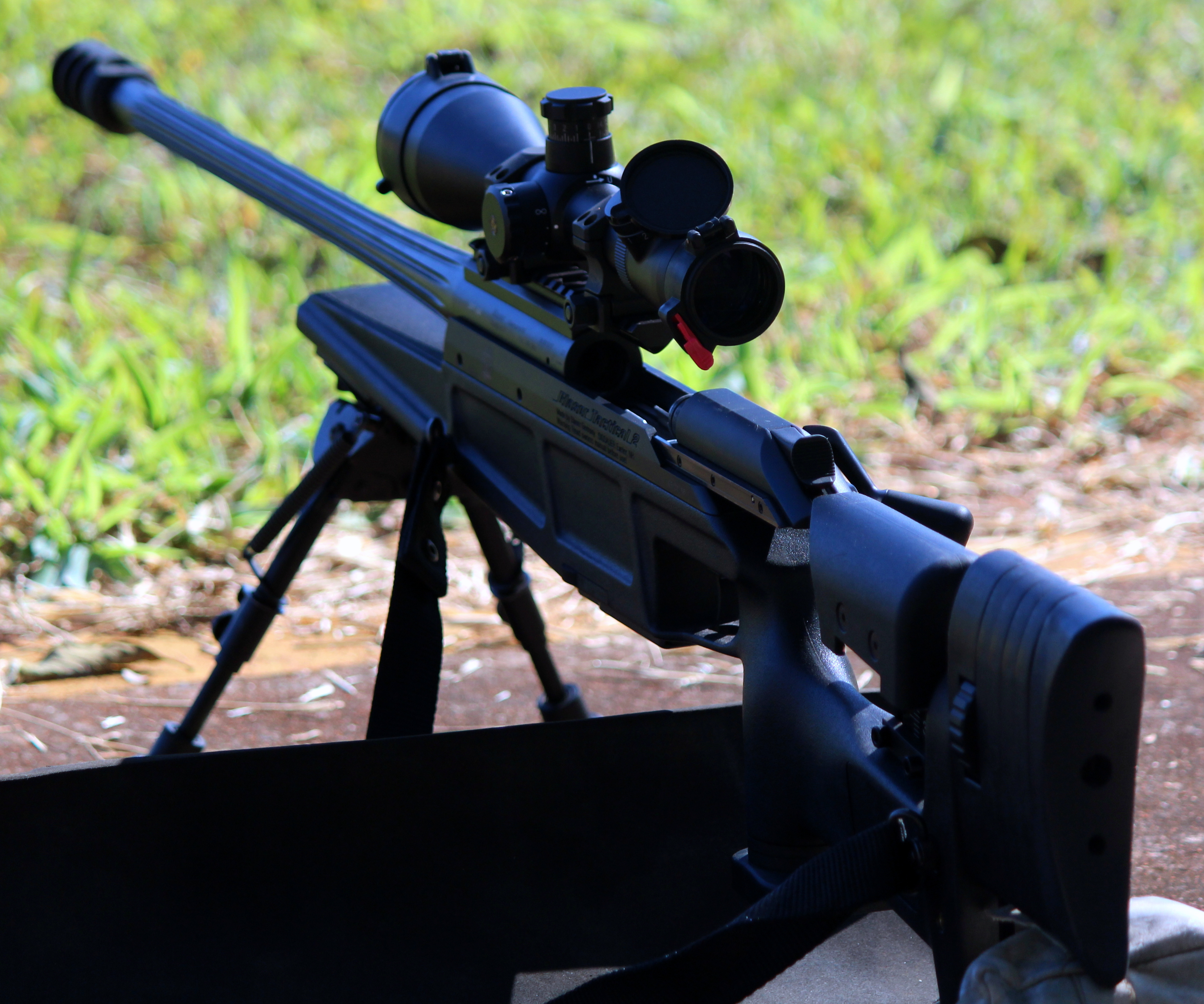

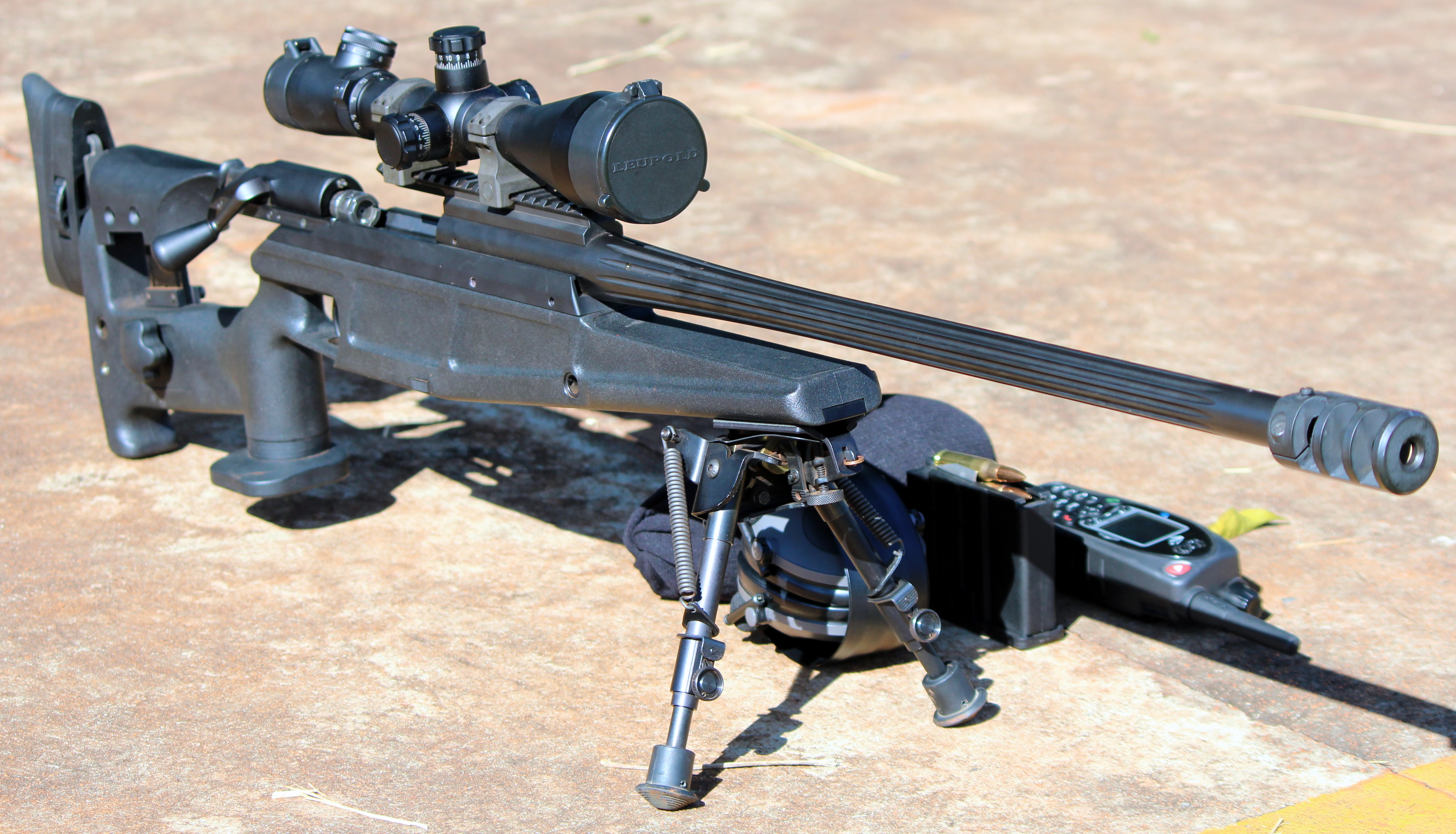

== Users ==
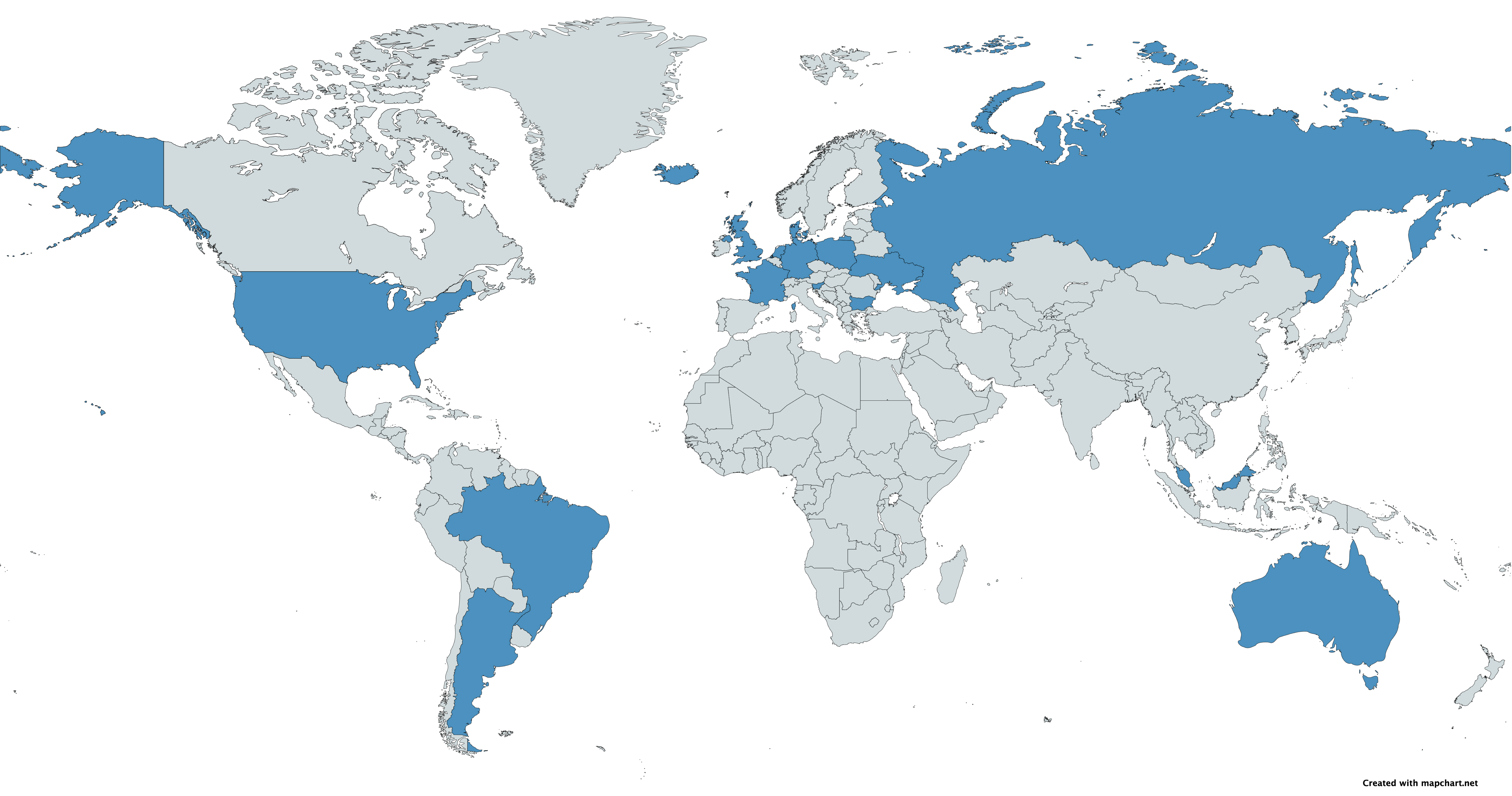
Map with Blaser R93 Tactical users in blue.

- Argentina: Used by the Law enforcement in Argentina.
- Australia: Used by the Australian Defence Force and various Police Tactical Groups.
- Brazil: Used by Comando de Operações Táticas (COT) Counter-Terrorism Forces of the Federal Police.
- Bulgaria: Used by the Joint Special Operations Command.
- Denmark: Used by the Danish AKS [Special police force].
- France: Used by special unit of Prefecture de Police de Paris named "Brigade d'Intervention"
- Germany: Used by German Police.
- Iceland: Used by Icelandic Police.
- Malaysia: Used by the Pasukan Khas Udara (PASKAU) Counter-Terrorism Forces of the Royal Malaysian Air Force and Special Task And Rescue Malaysian Maritime Enforcement Agency
- Netherlands: Used by Dutch Police.
- Poland: Used by Polish Border Guard.
- Russia: Used by Federal Protective Service and FSB.
- Slovenia: Used by Slovenian Police Special Forces.
- Ukraine: Used by special unit of Security Service of Ukraine named "A Group".
- United Kingdom: Used by at least one UK Police Force - notably Avon and Somerset Police.
- United States: Used by New Jersey State Police.
