= Comando de Operações Táticas =

Counter-terrorism force

Command for Tactical Operations Comando de Operações Táticas
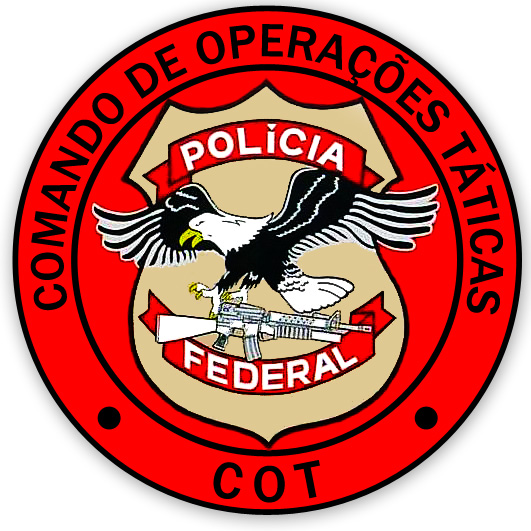
- Federal Special Forces Insignia
- Abbreviation: COT

Agency overview
- Formed: 1987

Jurisdictional structure
- Federal agency: Brazil
- Operations jurisdiction: Brazil
- General nature: Federal law enforcement

Operational structure
- Headquarters: Brasília, DF
- Agency executive: Anderson Rui Fontel de Oliveira
- Parent agency: Federal Police of Brazil

The Comando de Operações Táticas (Portuguese for Command Of Tactical Operations), mostly known by its acronym COT, is the tactical unit of the Federal Police of Brazil. It was created after Brazilian parliament recommendations, in an attempt to have a specialized counter-terrorism force. It was placed in service in 1987.

== Selection and process ==
COT is staffed by federal agents of the Brazilian Federal Police. Applicants volunteer for selection; participation is neither compulsory nor based on external recruitment.

The selection process is highly competitive and includes preliminary physical and psychological assessments. Approximately 60% of candidates are eliminated during this initial phase. Those who pass then enter an extended training program lasting more than one year, which includes the 20-week Tactical Training Course and further specialized instruction.

Candidates who pass the final examination are admitted to COT. They immediately begin training alongside established team members on a probationary status. During probation, they are assessed on their ability to integrate with the unit, responsiveness during tactical police operations, and performance throughout continued training.

== Activities ==
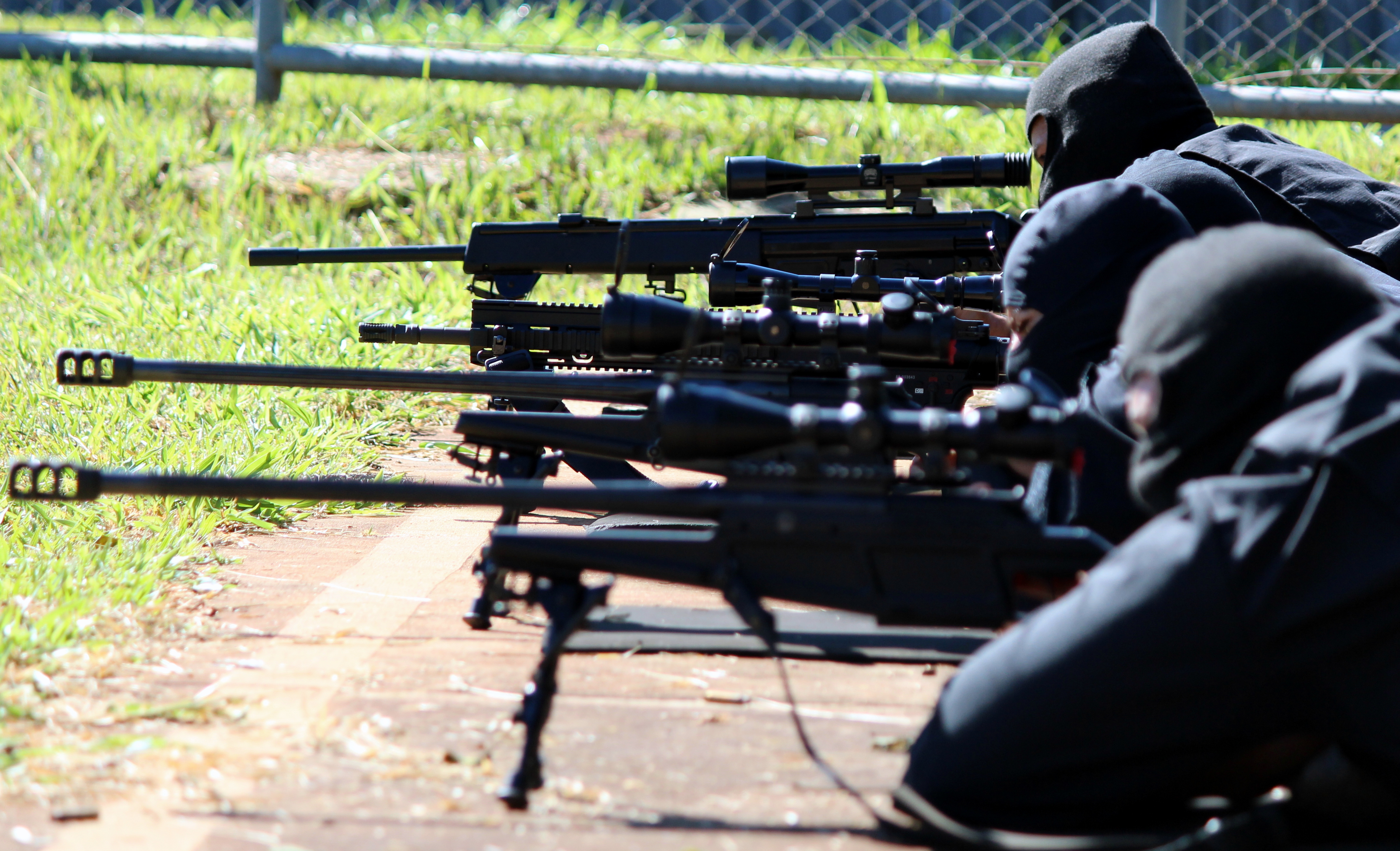
COT's snipers during a training section.

The COT is the elite unit of the Federal Police and is responsible for high-risk and complex interventions that require preparation beyond the conventional police forces. All COT officers are only employed in situations of high or very high risk, differentiated from non-specialized federal police officers.

Over the years, the COT adapted and evolved its training program based on the Brazilian reality; In addition to training common to the special operations units of other police in the world, COT has specific training to deal with operations against drug trafficking, terrorism and in biomes typical of Brazil, such as tropical forest, caatinga (desertic), marshland and cerrado. The COT is also responsible for resolving cases of seizure of civil aircraft within Brazil, with or without hostages.

The COT performs, on average, 110 operations per year throughout Brazil, distributed among sub-teams. In the interval of time they are not performing an operation, the members of the COT are in uninterrupted training at the Brasília base, being available and being able to be activated for an operation at any time.

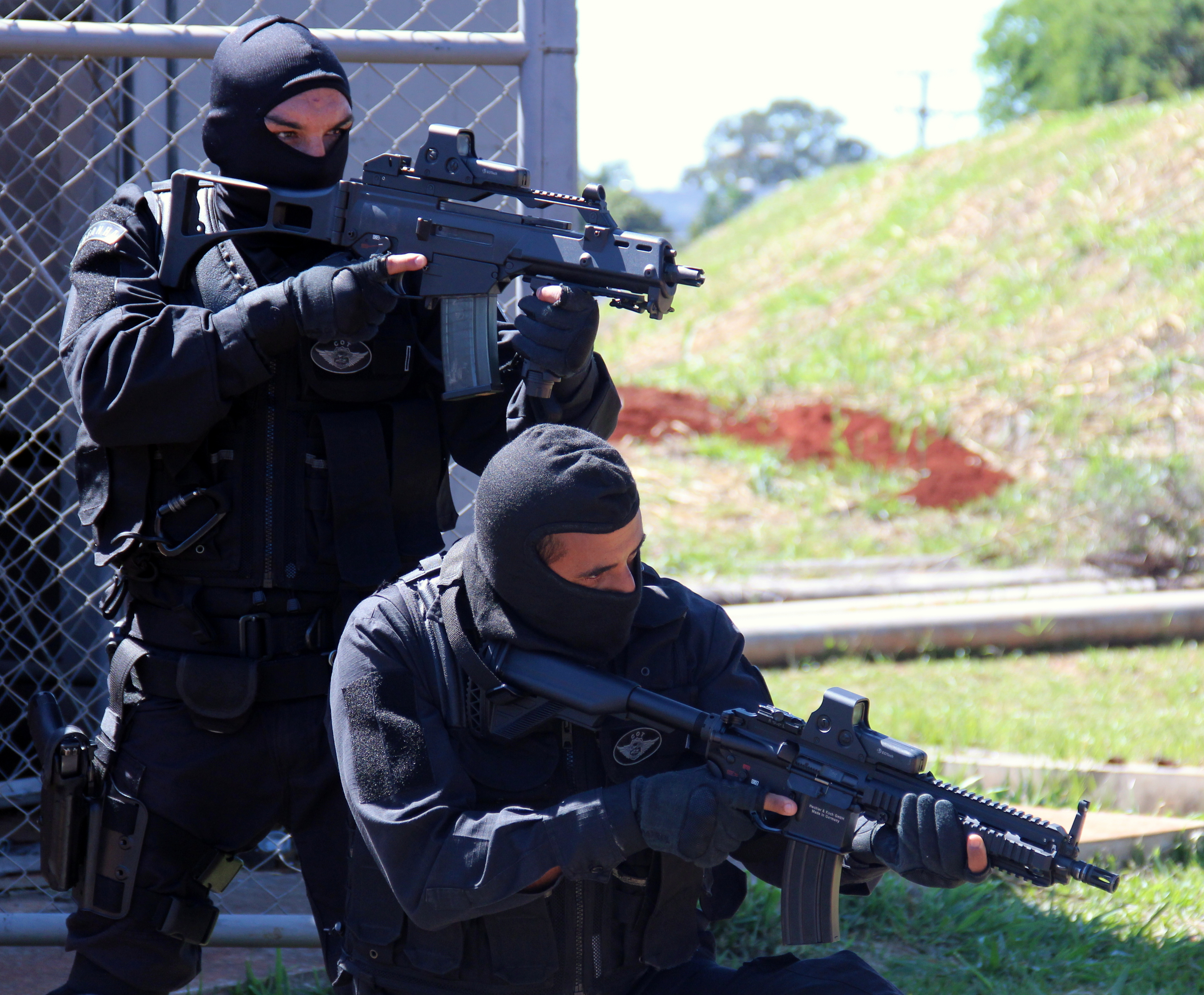
Members of the COT during a training exercise.

Since its inception, COT has never had a police officer killed in combat or any case of corruption among members of its staff.
