= National Prison Department (Brazil) =

- Departamento Penitenciário Nacional

Department overview
- Website: Official website, in Portuguese

Coat of arms of Brazil

The National Prison Department (DEPEN, Departamento Penitenciário Nacional in Portuguese) is the Brazilian government agency responsible for the security and administration of the Brazil federal prison system (Sistema Penitenciário Federal). This agency was reorganized in 2006, with the passage of several new laws and the construction of new prisons.

== Federal prisons ==
There are five prisons in the system.

- Porto Velho, Rondônia
- Mossoró, Rio Grande do Norte
- Campo Grande, Mato Grosso do Sul
- Brasília, Distrito Federal
- Catanduvas, Paraná

== See also ==
- Federal Police of Brazil
