= 2024 Brasília attack =

Car bombing in Brazil

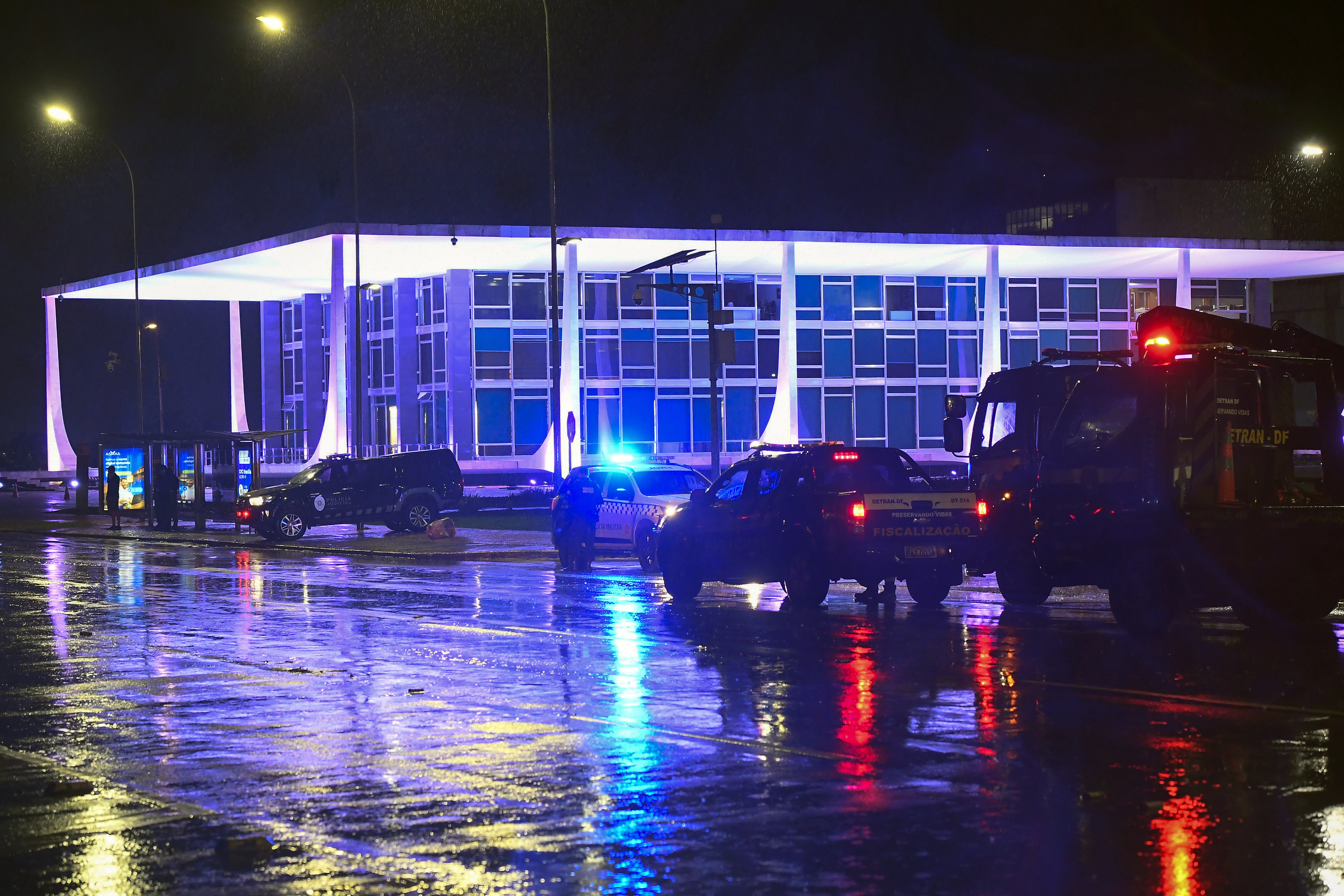
- Location: 15°48′03″S 47°51′41″W; Praça dos Três Poderes, Brasília, Brazil
- Date: 13 November 2024; 19:30 (UTC-3)
- Target: Supremo Tribunal Federal (STF) and Alexandre de Moraes
- Attack type: Suicide bombing
- Deaths: 1 (the perpetrator)
- Injuries: 0
- Perpetrator: Francisco Wanderley Luiz
- No. of participants: 1
- Motive: Far-right extremism

On 13 November 2024, the Praça dos Três Poderes in Brasília was struck by two explosions, leading to the isolation of the area and the mobilization of security forces to investigate possible threats to the seat of Brazilian powers. The area, where the National Congress of Brazil Palace, the Supreme Federal Court Palace and the Palácio do Planalto are located, was surrounded to carry out inspections and guarantee the protection of the facilities.

Francisco Wanderley Luiz, candidate for councilor not elected by the right-wing Liberal Party (PL) and perpetrator of the attack, died at the scene. Authorities are investigating the circumstances of the incident, which indicate that the author was acting under the influence of fake news based on defamatory statements that former president Jair Bolsonaro and allies used in his government, electoral campaign, speeches and publications on social networks.

== Bombings ==
"The individual had a backpack with him and was in a suspicious attitude in front of the statue, he placed the backpack on the ground, took out a fire extinguisher, took a blouse from inside the backpack and threw it at the statue. The individual removed some artifacts from his backpack and as the STF security guards approached, the individual opened his shirt and warned them not to get closer".

— Excerpt from the Civil Police Incident Report

At 19:30 local time on 13 November 2024, two explosions occurred in the Praça dos Três Poderes within 20 seconds of each other, with one occurring outside the Supreme Federal Court, while the other occurred near the National Congress. The former explosion resulted in the evacuation of the justices of the Supreme Court. The President, Luiz Inácio Lula da Silva, was not in the nearby Palácio do Planalto at the time of the explosions.

At the time of the attack, Francisco was wearing clothes designed with images of playing cards. He then laid down on the ground and waited for the bomb to explode. When he died, his face and right hand were completely disfigured, and his remains were thrown meters away. His backpack was found at the scene. The vehicle with fireworks that exploded near Annex IV of the Chamber of Deputies belonged to him.

== Reactions ==
The Chamber of Deputies suspended its session due to the explosions. Attorney General of the Union Jorge Messias condemned the attacks, and said that the federal police would investigate them in order to determine their motivation.

== Perpetrator ==
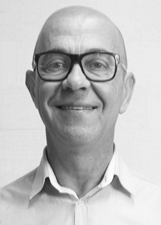
Official photo of Francisco Wanderley Luiz's candidacy for the position of councilor of Rio do Sul for the Liberal Party in 2020

The body found in Praça dos Três Poderes was identified as that of Francisco Wanderley Luiz, 59 years old, a candidate for councilor who was not elected in Rio do Sul, Santa Catarina, in the 2020 election for the Liberal Party (PL), known as Tiü França (lit. 'Uncle França' or 'Uncle France'). According to the Federal Police of Brazil, he was responsible for causing the explosions. In 2012, he was arrested on misdemeanor bail. His case was reported to the Public Prosecutor's Office in 2013, leaving him free for a period and then in open custody. His conviction was overturned in 2014.

Investigations showed that he had rented a house in the Federal District, in Ceilândia. Before the attack, he posted cryptic messages on his Facebook profile with bomb threats against targets he called "fucking communists"; the profile was taken down after the explosions. Luiz also posted a photograph of himself inside the Supreme Federal Court, where he was on 24 August 2024, and threatening messages to the presidents of the Chamber of Deputies and the Federal Senate, Arthur Lira and Rodrigo Pacheco, and the presidents generals Tomás Paiva and Freire Gomes. Among his publications made that day, one said: "They let the fox into the henhouse. [...] Either they don't know the size of their prey or it's just stupidity. Proverbs 16:18 (Pride comes before a fall)".

In the house rented by Luiz in Ceilândia, the Federal Police found inscriptions with references to the attacks of 8 January 2023 in Brasília and a bomb plan. A drawer in the room exploded when it was opened by a bomb disposal robot. In addition to the house and car, federal police located a trailer rented by the perpetrator of the explosions, which was also in the Annex IV parking lot of the Chamber of Deputies. Inside the vehicle, the Federal Police found, in addition to clothes, money, tools and other objects, a cell phone, more explosives and a cap with Jair Bolsonaro's campaign slogan, "Brazil above everything, God above everyone". The searches of the residence and trailer were authorized by the STF minister, Alexandre de Moraes.

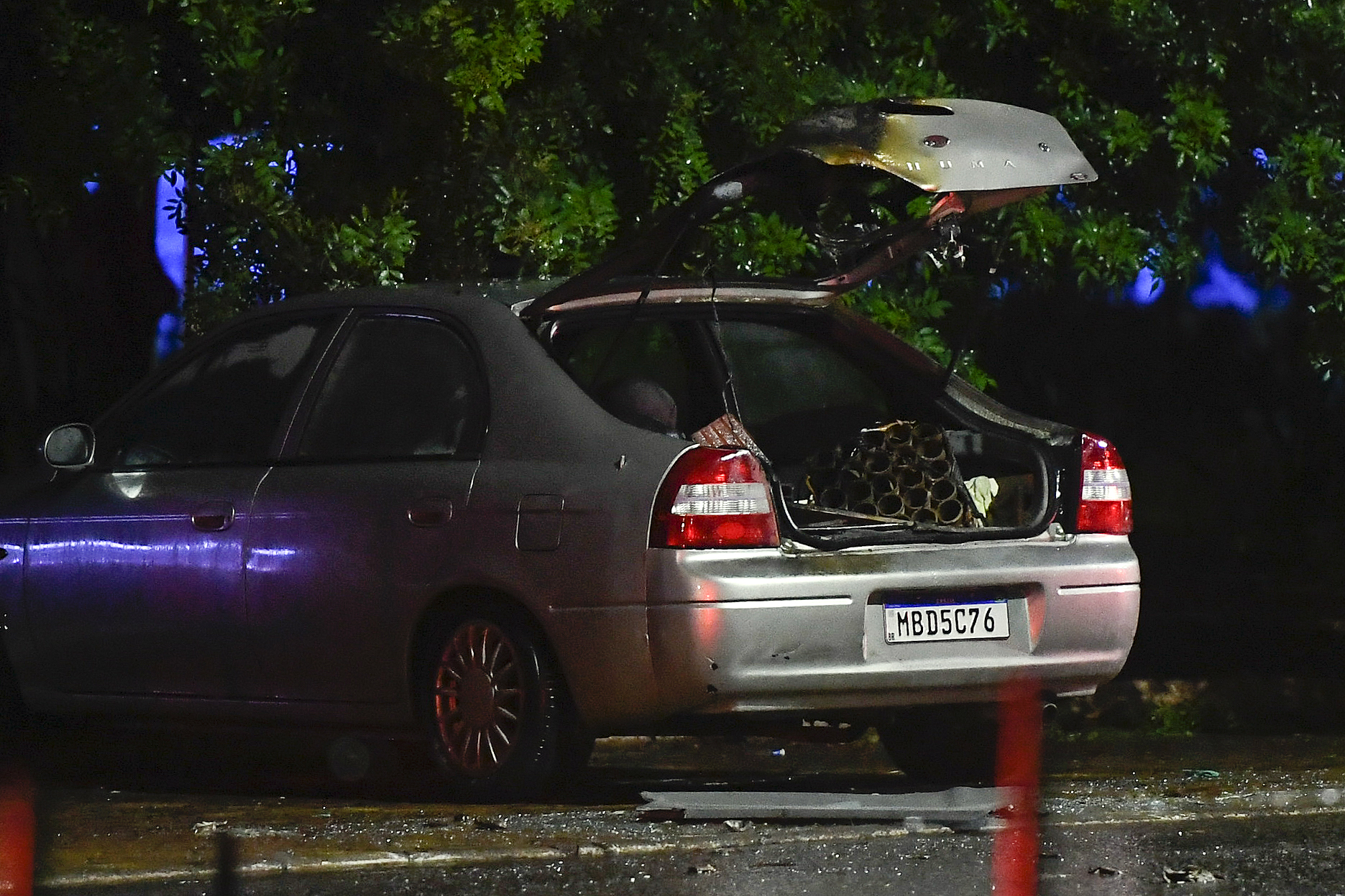
The vehicle that detonated close to Annex IV of the Chamber of Deputies

On 13 November, one of Luiz's sons told the Federal Police that he had received "farewell" messages from his father in recent days.

Luiz's ex-wife stated that his objective was to kill ministers of the Federal Supreme Court, especially Moraes. His brother also confirmed a process of political radicalization in the two years prior to the incident, and Eduardo Marzall, president of the PL municipal directory in the election in which Luiz ran, described him as "extremely bolsonarista, a staunch supporter and fanatic of Bolsonaro".

Andrei Rodrigues, director general of the Federal Police, stated that "extremist groups are active" and added that the episode "is not an isolated event" and is "connected with several other actions that the PF has investigated in recent times".

On the morning of the following day, on Thursday, the STF received a threatening message by email, also referencing Luiz.

== Inquiry ==
On 14 November, the president of the Supreme Federal Court (STF), minister Luís Roberto Barroso, appointed minister Alexandre de Moraes as rapporteur of the investigation into the case. Moraes assumed the role of rapporteur based on the prevention rule, as he is already responsible for investigations related to similar topics. The minister also stated that the explosions represent a reflection of the political hatred that has taken hold in Brazil in recent years, highlighting that this episode is not an "isolated fact in the context".

On the morning of 17 November, a fire broke out at a property owned by Luiz in Santa Catarina. His ex-wife, Daiane Dias, was suspected of setting the fire. She was injured in the incident and was rescued by a neighbor. The family reportedly confirmed her responsibility in the incident.

A witness told police Dias had intentionally remained inside the burning property in an attempted suicide. She reportedly also stated in a video that she had planned the Brasília attack with her ex-husband. On 3 December she died from the burns she sustained.

== See also ==
- Bolsonarism
- Right-wing terrorism
- Domestic terrorism
