= Márcio Schiefler Fontes =

Brazilian Auxiliary Judge Supreme Court

Councillor of the National Council of Justice
- In office 10 October 2017 – 10 October 2019
- Appointed by: Michel Temer

Personal details
- Born: Márcio Schiefler Fontes; 29 September 1980 Florianópolis, Santa Catarina, Brazil
- Education: Law School, Federal University of Santa Catarina
- Occupation: Judge
- Awards: "Order of Judicial Military Merit".

Márcio Schiefler Fontes is a Brazilian judge and jurist. From a judicial career in Santa Catarina, he became auxiliary judge and the main assistant to Justice Teori Zavascki, who oversaw at the Supreme Federal Court the massive investigation known as Operation Car Wash, a landmark anti-corruption probe in Brazil and other Latin American countries, until the latter's death in a plane crash in 2017.

After that, the Supreme Federal Court decided to nominate him Councillor of the National Council of Justice, in which he served as supervisor to the national prison system.

In 2022, he was summoned to act as auxiliary judge to the then new Chief Justice of the Supreme Federal Court, Justice Rosa Weber, in whose tenure a mob stormed the Presidential offices, the Supreme Court building, and the National Congress in Brazil’s capital, Brasilia.
