= Structural dump =

Dump in the Federal District, Brazil

Coordinates: 15°46′25″S 47°59′55″W

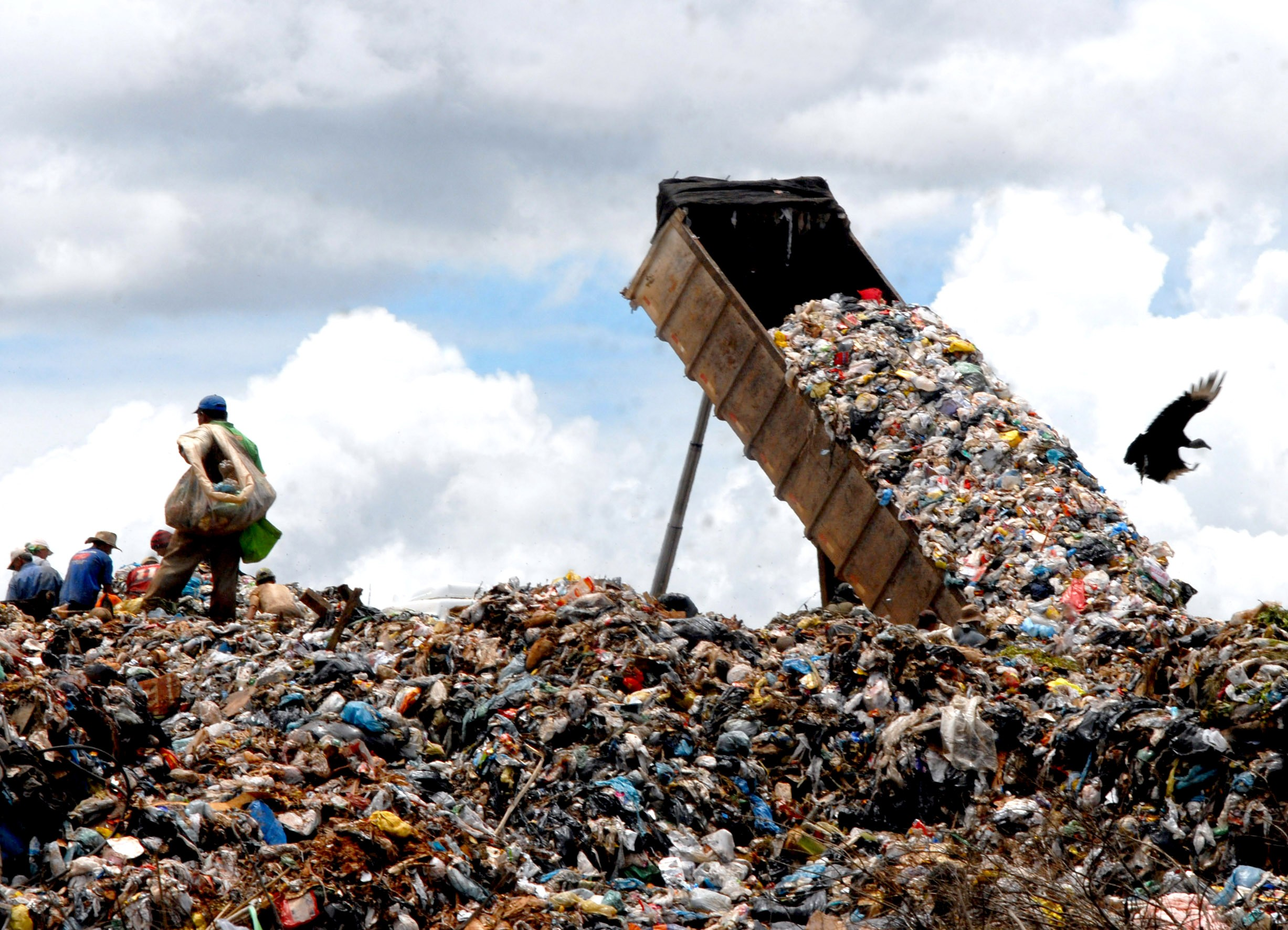

The structural dump (Portuguese: Lixão da Estrutural), is a dump in the Federal District, Brazil. It is one of the largest on the continent of America. It was in operation for (67) years and was officially closed on 19 January 2018.

== Location and description ==
The dump is located west-north-west of the centre of Brasília, around 12 kilometers from Palácio do Planalto. The total area is around 1.75–2 km^{2}. It contains approximately 50 Gg of waste.

== Operation and closure ==
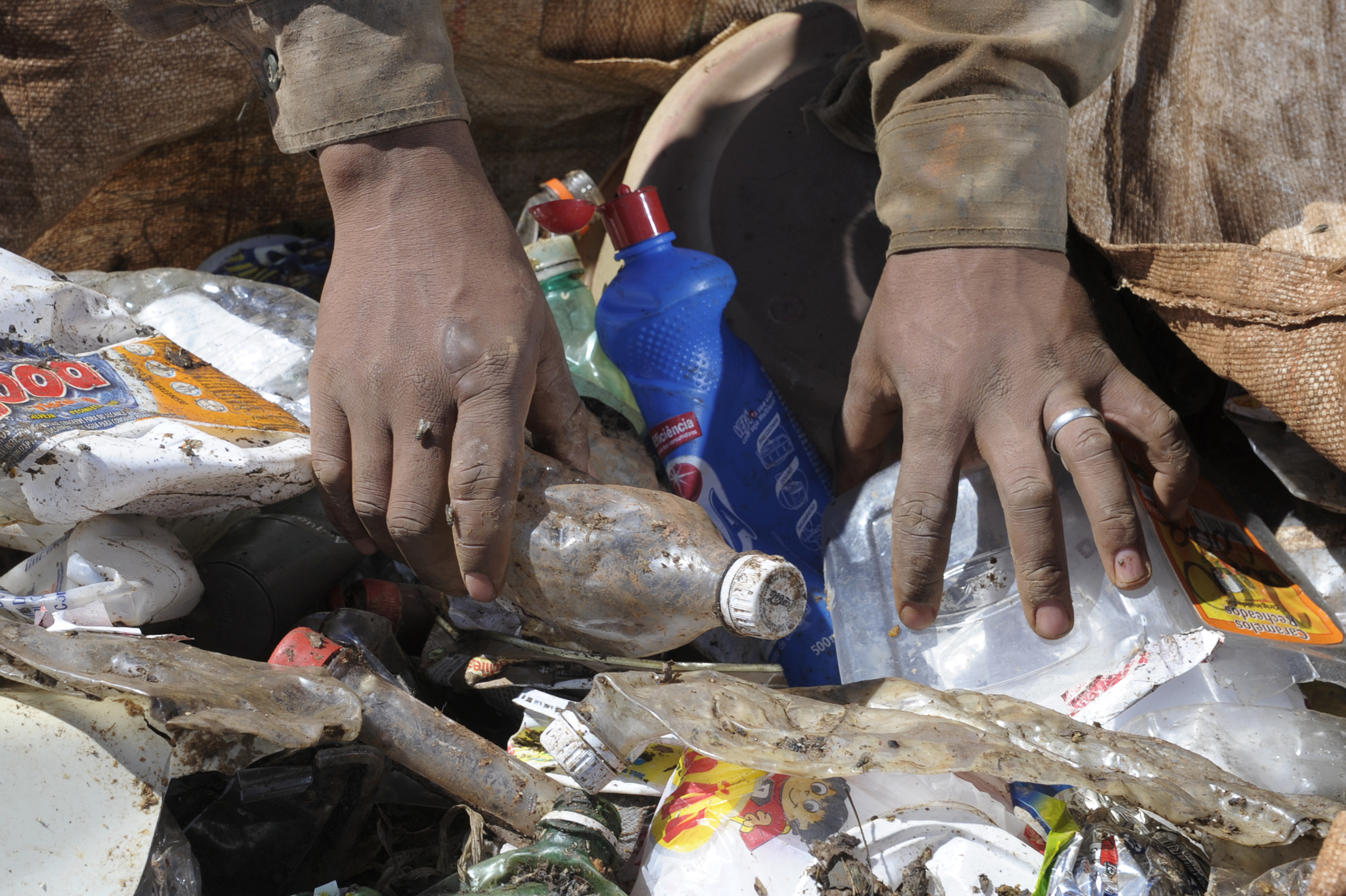
Picking through rubbish for recyclables

While in operation, around 3,000 people picked through the garbage for recyclable plastic, metal, paper, and other items of value to sell. The dump processed around 1,000 tonnes of garbage every day. According to Rodrigo Rollemberg, governor of the Federal District, the rubbish scavengers who once worked there are expected to receive paid employment in a recycling centre.

A new landfill, located further from the centre of Brasília, has opened to take its place.
