= Praça dos Três Poderes =

Plaza in Brasília, Brazil

Coordinates: 15°48′03″S 47°51′41″W

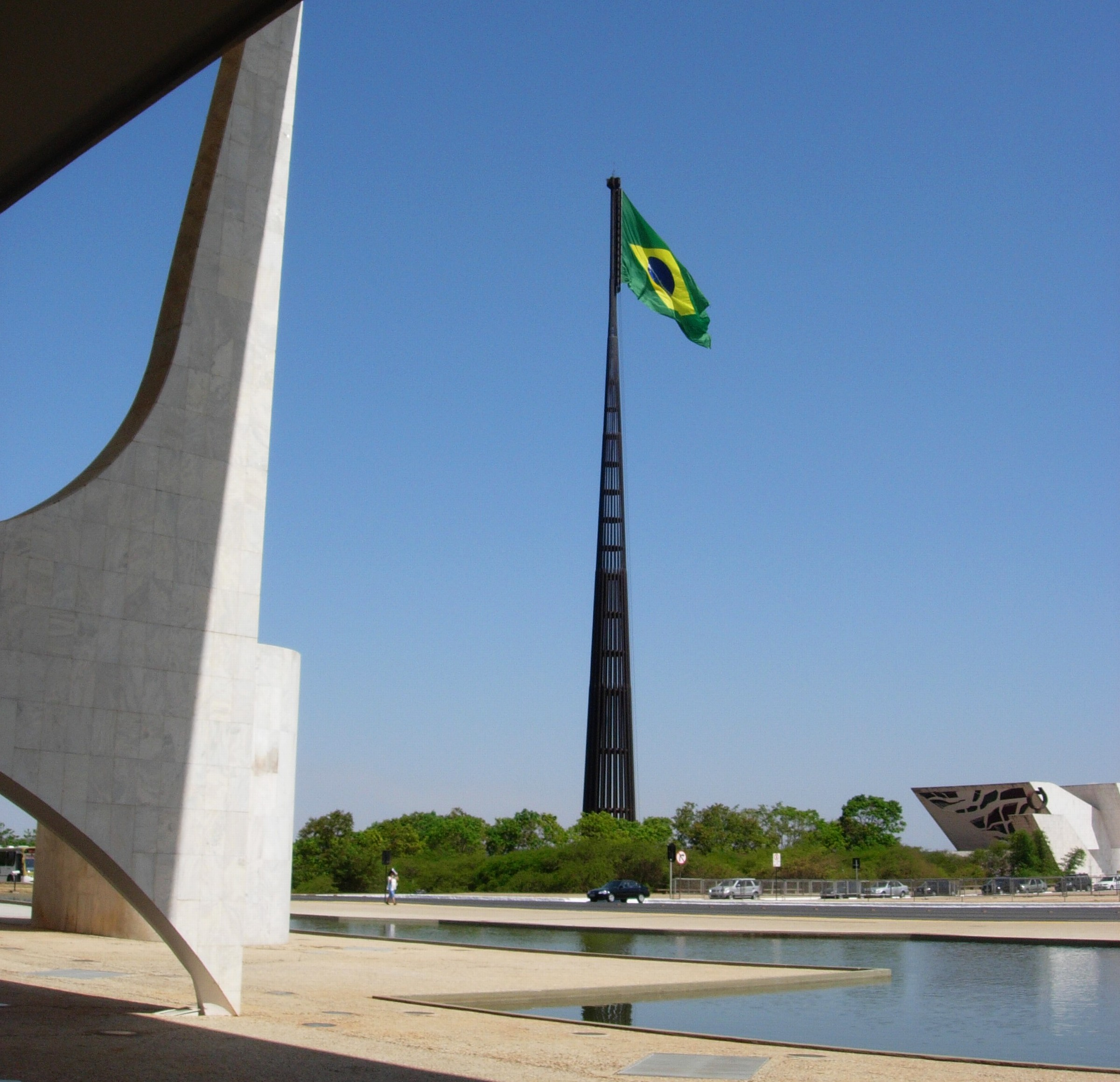
The Brazilian flag flying above the plaza

Praça dos Três Poderes (Portuguese pronunciation: [ˈpɾasɐ dus ˈtɾe(j)s poˈdeɾis]) or Three Powers Plaza (more idiomatically Three Branches Plaza) is a plaza in Brasília, the capital of Brazil. The name is derived from the presence of the three branches of government around the plaza: the Executive, represented by the Palácio do Planalto (presidential office); the Legislative represented by the National Congress of Brazil; and the Judiciary, represented by the Supreme Federal Court.

The plaza was designed by Lúcio Costa and Oscar Niemeyer as a place where the three powers would meet harmoniously. It is now also a tourist attraction.

The plaza is home to the largest flag in the world to be flown regularly (in this case, continuously). The Brazilian flag hoisted weighs about 90 kilograms (200 pounds) and has never been taken down (not counting monthly replacements) since the capital was inaugurated on 21 April 1960. The flag is changed monthly in the presence of Presidential Guard Battalion, Independence Dragoons, other troops and sometimes the President of Brazil.

On 8 January 2023, the plaza was stormed by supporters of former president Jair Bolsonaro.

On 13 November 2024, there was a pair of explosions near the plaza. One death was recorded, that of the suspect, and there were no injuries.

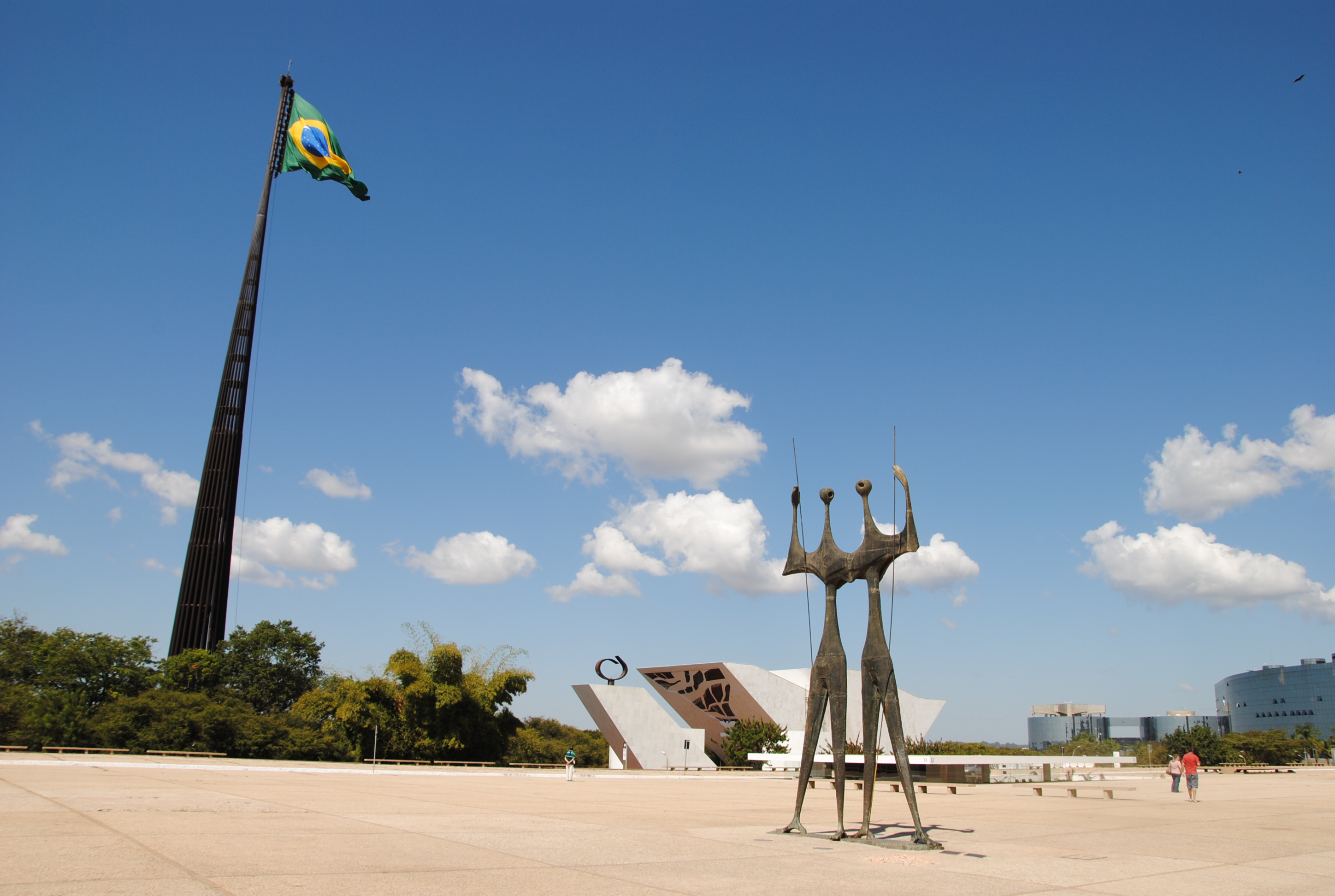
Partial view of the Praçados Três Poderes with the Brazilian flag and Os Candangos sculpture

== History ==
The transfer of the Brazilian capital to a central region of the country was conceived in the 19th century by José Bonifácio de Andrada e Silva, patron of Brazilian Independence, with the aim of protecting it from potential foreign attacks via the coast.

The Three Powers Plaza conceived by Lúcio Costa in his project submitted to the National Competition for the Pilot Plan of the New Capital of Brazil. In his explanatory report, which is considered the major factor that led Lúcio to victory, guideline number 9 deals, among other sectors, with the Three Powers Plaza, where it is named as such for the first time.

== Characteristics ==
Three Powers Square
	Numbers in image correspond to numbers in list of landmarks, museums and other features below.
1	Visitor Center
2	Dovecote by Oscar Niemeyer
3	Supreme Federal Court Palace
4	Sculpture The Justice by Alfredo Ceschiatti
5	Espaço Lúcio Costa Museum
6	Chamber of Deputies Annex IV Building (in the background)
7	City Museum
8	Israel Pinheiro monument
9	Itamaraty Palace (Ministry of Foreign Affairs, in the background)
10	Ministries Esplanade (in the background)
11	UNESCO Monument
12	National Congress Building
12a	Chamber of Deputies Tower
12b	Senate Tower
13	TV Tower (in the background)
14	Sculpture The Warriors (or "The Candangos") by Bruno Giorgi
15	Senate Annex II Building (in the background)
16	Palácio do Planalto Building

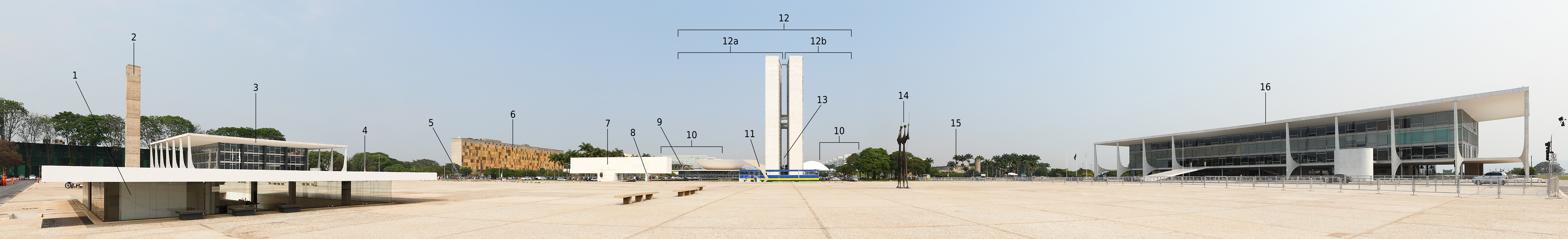
Panoramic view of the Praça dos Três Poderes

== See also ==
- List of Oscar Niemeyer works
