= Bruno Giorgi =

Brazilian sculptor (1905–1993)

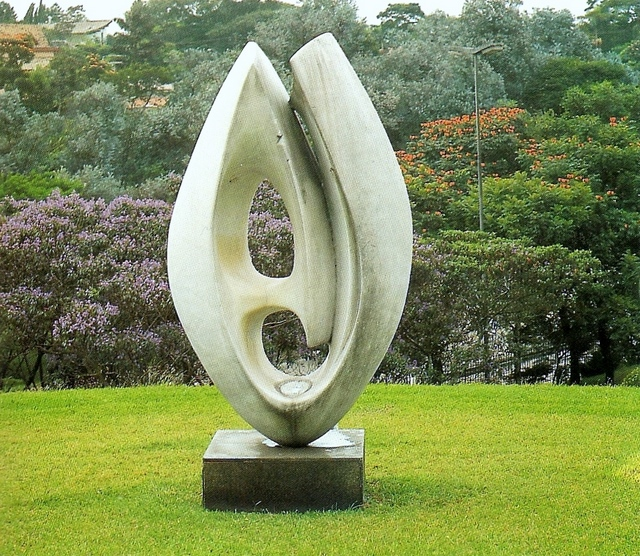
Escultura (1970) sculpture by Bruno Giorgi

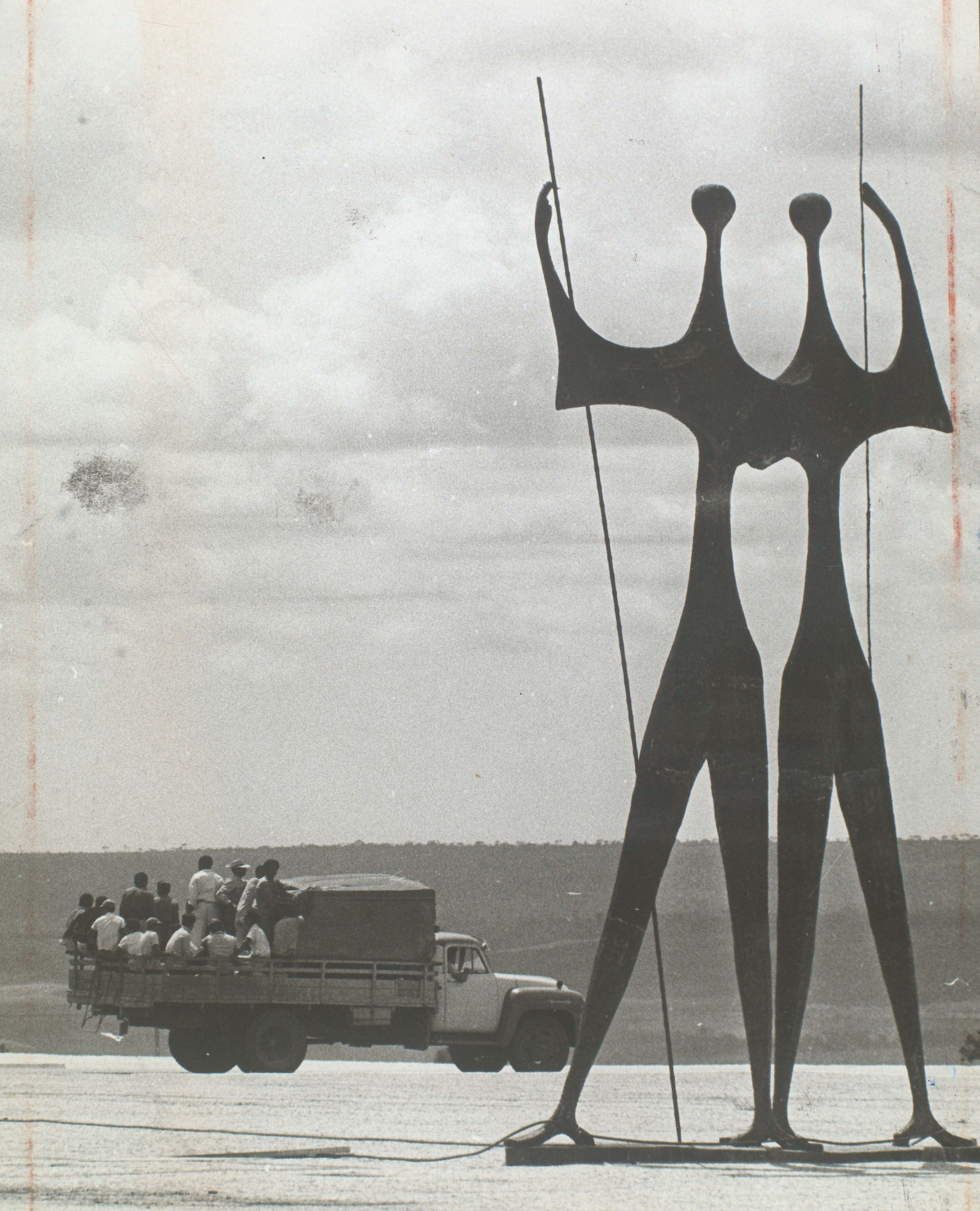
Os Candangos (1959) by Bruno Giorgi at Praça dos Três Poderes, Brasília, Brazil

Bruno Giorgi (13 August 1905, Mococa – 7 September 1993, Rio de Janeiro) was a Brazilian sculptor, who worked within Brazilian modernism. He was from a small town in the interior of São Paulo state called Mococa. Although born in Brazil he spent much of his early life in Europe as his family returned to Italy when he was age six, and he did not return to Brazil until 1939. His works are displayed at several national sites.

== List of works ==
- Os Candangos (1959), public art sculpture in front of the Palácio do Planalto in Praça dos Três Poderes, Brasília, Brazil
- Meteoro (sculpture) (1968), public art sculpture in the lake of the Ministry of Foreign Affairs building, Brasília, Brazil
- Escultura (1970), public sculpture, Palácio dos Bandeirantes, São Paulo, Brazil
- O Flautista, sculpture, Palácio do Planalto, Brasília, Brazil; destroyed during protests
