= Supreme Federal Court Palace =

Historic federal government building in Brasília, Brazil

- Palácio do Supremo Tribunal Federal
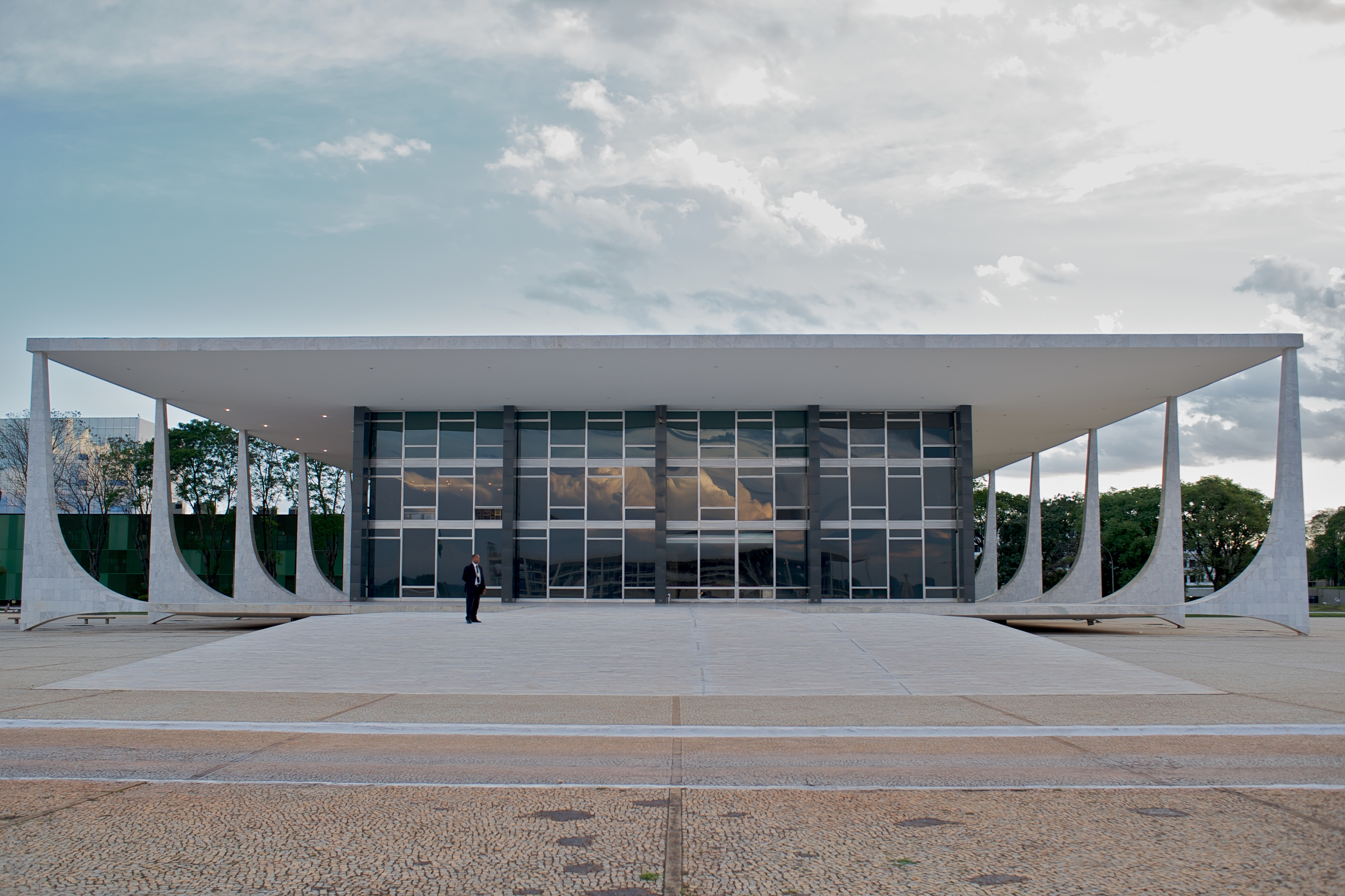
- Interactive map of the Supreme Federal Court Palace area

General information
- Architectural style: Modernist
- Location: Praça dos Três Poderes, Brasília, Federal District, Brazil
- Coordinates: 15.802222°S 47.861944°W
- Current tenants: Brazilian Supreme Court
- Year built: 1956–1960
- Inaugurated: 21 April 1960
- Client: Brazilian government
- Owner: Brazilian government

Design and construction
- Architect: Oscar Niemeyer
- Structural engineer: Joaquim Cardozo

National Historic Heritage of Brazil
- Designated: 2007
- Reference no.: 1550

The Supreme Federal Court Palace is the seat of the Supreme Federal Court, Brazilian highest appealing court and constitutional court. It was designed by architect Oscar Niemeyer and the structural project was carried out by engineer Joaquim Cardozo.

It is part of the Praça dos Três Poderes (Three Powers Plaza), whose other buildings are the Palácio do Planalto presidential palace and the National Congress. The building was declared a national heritage site by the National Institute of Historic and Artistic Heritage (IPHAN) in 2007, the year that Niemeyer turned 100.

== Sculpture by Ceschiatti ==
The work "A Justiça" (The Justice) is located in front of the Supreme Court. The statue was sculpted in 1961 by Alfredo Ceschiatti.

== Architectural characteristics ==
The building is supported by side pillars and is slightly elevated from the ground, giving lightness to the whole. The structural calculations by Joaquim Cardozo allowed the foundations of the Supreme Court building and other palaces, as well as of the Cathedral of Brasília, to be thin, barely touching the ground.

== Storming ==
The 8 January 2023 attacks in Brasília, also commonly known as the 8 January coup or simply 8 January, were a series of invasions and depredation of public property perpetrated by a crowd of Bolsonarists, who stormed federal government buildings in Brasília, trying to instigate a military coup d'état against the Lula administration and reestablish Jair Bolsonaro as President of Brazil.

Around 13:00 BRT, around 4,000 Bolsonarists left the Brazilian Army Headquarters and walked towards Three Powers Plaza, coming into conflict with the Military Police of the Federal District (PMDF) on the Monumental Axis. Before 15:00 BRT, the crowd broke the security barrier established by the police and occupied the ramp and roof of the National Congress, while part of the group was able to storm and vandalize the Congress, the Planalto Palace and the Supreme Court Building. President Luiz Inácio Lula da Silva and former president Bolsonaro were not in Brasília. The Supreme Federal Court considered the attacks to be acts of terrorism.

The Governor of the Federal District, Ibaneis Rocha, reported that more than 400 people were arrested by 21:00 BRT. On the following day, around 1,200 people who were camping in front of the Army HQ were also arrested and taken by bus to the Federal Police headquarters. By March 2023, 2,182 people had been arrested for participating or having some kind of involvement with the attacks. Right after the events, Ibaneis Rocha fired Secretary of Public Security and former Bolsonaro Justice Minister, Anderson Torres, who was in Orlando, Florida on the day of the attacks. Later, Supreme Court justice Alexandre de Moraes suspended Rocha for 90 days, decision revoked on 15 March. After the attacks, president Lula da Silva signed an executive order authorizing a federal intervention in the Federal District until 31 January.

Government representatives criticized the act and stated that the people responsible for the attacks, as well as their financers and perpetrators, would be identified and punished. Leaders of many Brazilian parties repudiated the invasion, considered a serious attack against democracy, and demanded punishment for those responsible. Many national leaders and condemned the invasion, expressing solidarity to the federal government. Many analysts compared the attacks to the United States Capitol storming in 2021 by Donald Trump supporters, who similarly had refused to accept his defeat in US elections. Others compared to the 1938 Integralist Uprising when referring to the attacks, sometimes, as Bolsonarist Uprising, by the similarity to failed coup attempts by a far-right group at the time. Many social movements called for protests against the attacks and in defense of democracy, which took place on 9 January in São Paulo, Rio de Janeiro, Porto Alegre, Recife, Curitiba, Belo Horizonte and other cities, gathering thousands of people.
