= Palácio do Planalto =

Workplace of the president of Brazil

Coordinates: 15°47′57″S 47°51′39″W

Planalto Palace
- Palácio do Planalto (Portuguese)
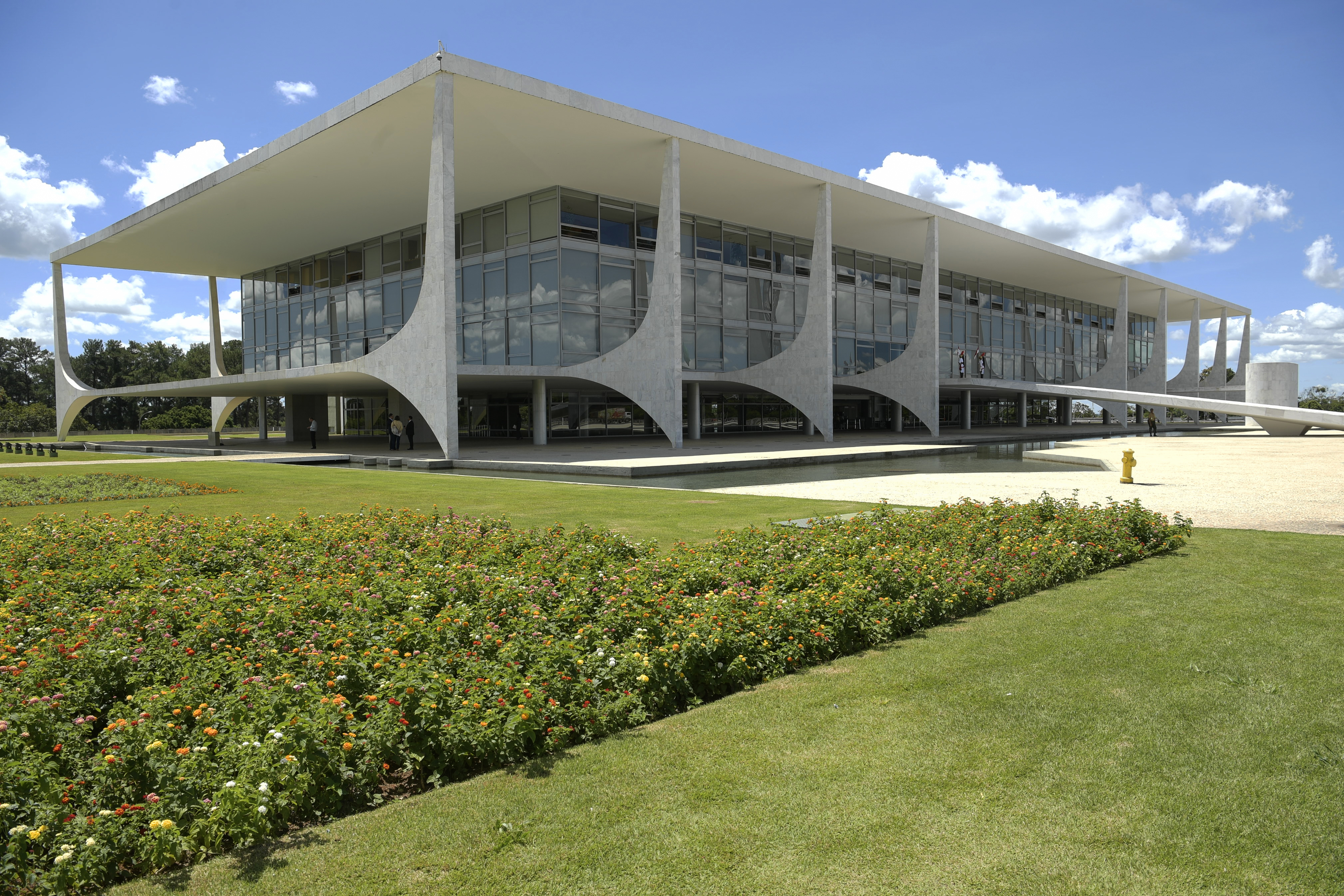

- Location within Brasília

General information
- Architectural style: Modernist
- Location: Praça dos Três Poderes, Brasília, Brazil
- Elevation: 1,172 m (3,845 ft)
- Current tenants: Luiz Inácio Lula da Silva, President of Brazil
- Construction started: 10 July 1958
- Inaugurated: 21 April 1960
- Renovated: 2009–2010
- Client: Brazilian government
- Owner: Brazilian government

Height
- Height: 65.65 ft (20.01 m)

Technical details
- Floor count: 4 (above ground); 1 (below ground)
- Floor area: 36,000 m^{2} (390,000 ft^{2})

Design and construction
- Architect: Oscar Niemeyer

Other information
- Parking: 500 vehicles (underground)

Website
- www.planalto.gov.br

UNESCO World Heritage Site
- Criteria: Cultural: (i), (iv)
- Designated: 1987 (11th session)
- Part of: Brasília
- Reference no.: 445
- Region: Latin America and the Caribbean

National Historic Heritage of Brazil

The Palácio do Planalto (Portuguese pronunciation: [paˈlasju du plaˈnawtu]) in Brasília is the official workplace of the president of Brazil. The building was designed by Oscar Niemeyer in 1958 and inaugurated on 21 April 1960. It has been the workplace of every Brazilian president since Juscelino Kubitschek. It is located at the Praça dos Três Poderes (Three Powers Plaza), to the east of the National Congress of Brazil and across from the Supreme Federal Court.

It is one of the official palaces of the Presidency, along with the Palácio da Alvorada, the official residence. Besides the president, other high ranking government officials also work from the Planalto, including the Vice-President and the Chief of Staff; the other government ministry buildings are located on the Ministries Esplanade. As the seat of government, the term Planalto is often used as a metonym for the executive branch of the federal government.

The building, constructed in the modernist style, is part of the Brasília World Heritage Site, designated by UNESCO in 1987.

== History ==
The presidential palace was a major feature of the plan for the newly established federal capital, Brasília. Oscar Niemeyer was chosen as the architect of the Palácio do Planalto and the building's construction, led by Construtora Rabello S.A., began on 10 July 1958. The Executive Office was temporarily headquartered at the Catetinho, on the outskirts of Brasília, during construction.

The palace was officially inaugurated on 21 April 1960, by President Juscelino Kubitschek. It was one of the first buildings inaugurated in the new capital city, along with the National Congress and the Supreme Federal Court. The inauguration ceremony was attended by several foreign leaders and attracted thousands of spectators, as it symbolised the transfer of the capital city from Rio de Janeiro to the center of the country.

The palace owes its name to the Brazilian Highlands (the term planalto meaning highland), specifically the Brazilian Central Plateau, where Brasília is located.

=== 2009–2010 restoration ===
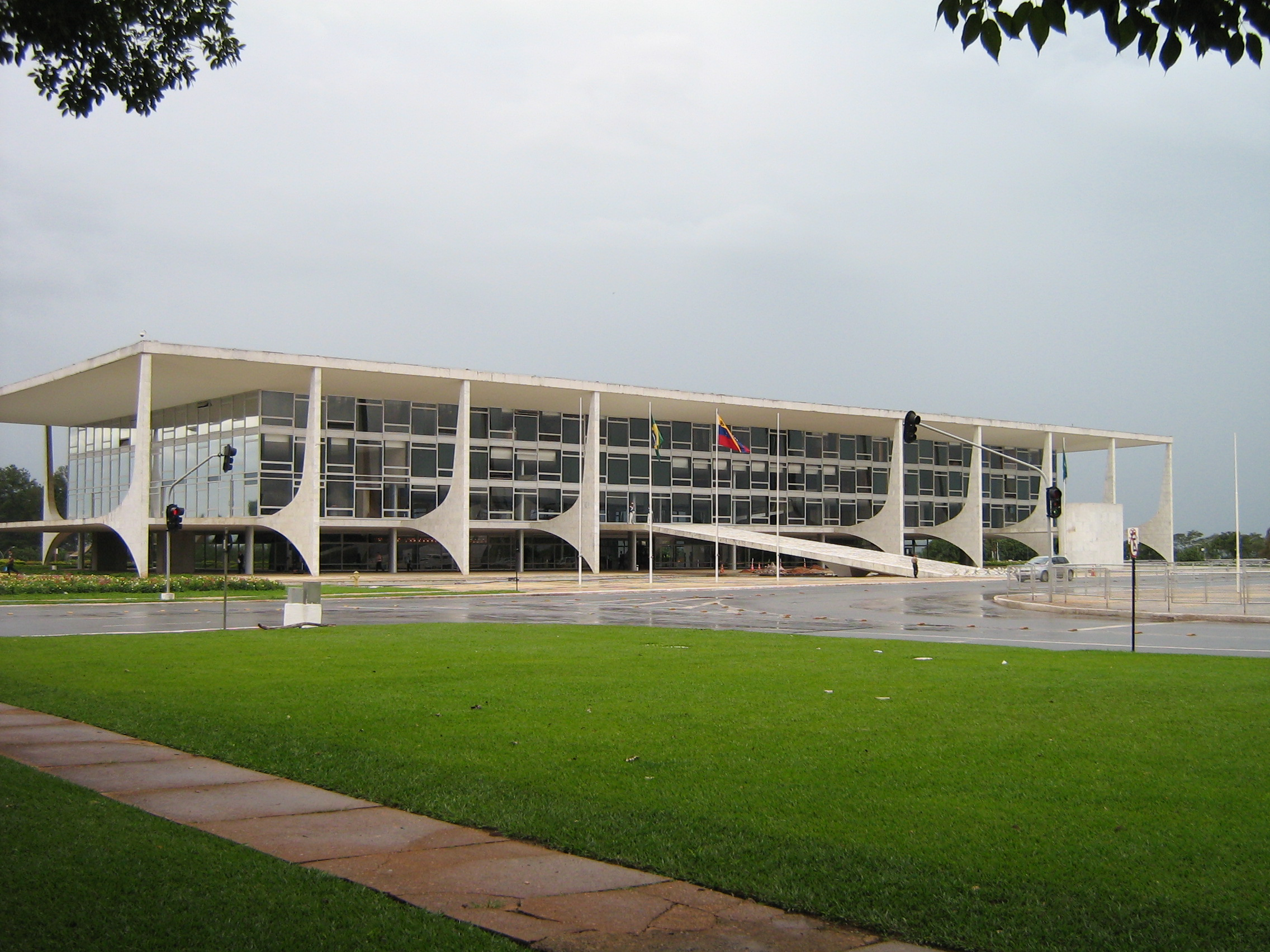
Planalto from the front

In March 2009, President Luiz Inácio Lula da Silva ordered an extensive restoration of the palace. Decades of poor maintenance had taken a great toll on the structure built in 1958. The restoration was completed on 24 August 2010, at a cost of R$ 111 million. The restoration focused on: installing new electricity, water and central air conditioning systems; complete dismantling of the interior spaces and construction of new interior divisions; restoration of the exterior marble and granite façade; construction of an underground parking garage for 500 vehicles; substitution of the electrical generators; restoration of windows and doors; construction of emergency stairs; and technology upgrades

During the restoration process, the Executive Office was transferred temporarily to the Centro Cultural Banco do Brasil ('Bank of Brazil Cultural Center') and to the Itamaraty Palace.

=== 2023 storming ===
On 8 January 2023, the Palácio do Planalto was stormed and vandalized by supporters of former president Jair Bolsonaro, who refused to accept the results of the 2022 Brazilian presidential election won by Luiz Inácio Lula da Silva. The attack took place simultaneously at the Planalto, the National Congress of Brazil and the Supreme Federal Court, all located at the Praça dos Três Poderes.

Thousands of rioters broke into the palace, smashing windows, destroying furniture, and damaging artworks and artefacts. Among the items destroyed was the bronze sculpture O Flautista (The Flutist) by Bruno Giorgi, which had been located on the third floor of the palace, near the presidential office. Presidential artworks and decorative items were also damaged or destroyed.

President Lula da Silva, who had been inaugurated only a week earlier on 1 January 2023, was in the state of São Paulo at the time of the attack and condemned the riots as acts of "fascism and fanaticism." He subsequently declared a federal intervention in the Federal District to restore order. Hundreds of rioters were arrested in the aftermath.

== Architecture ==
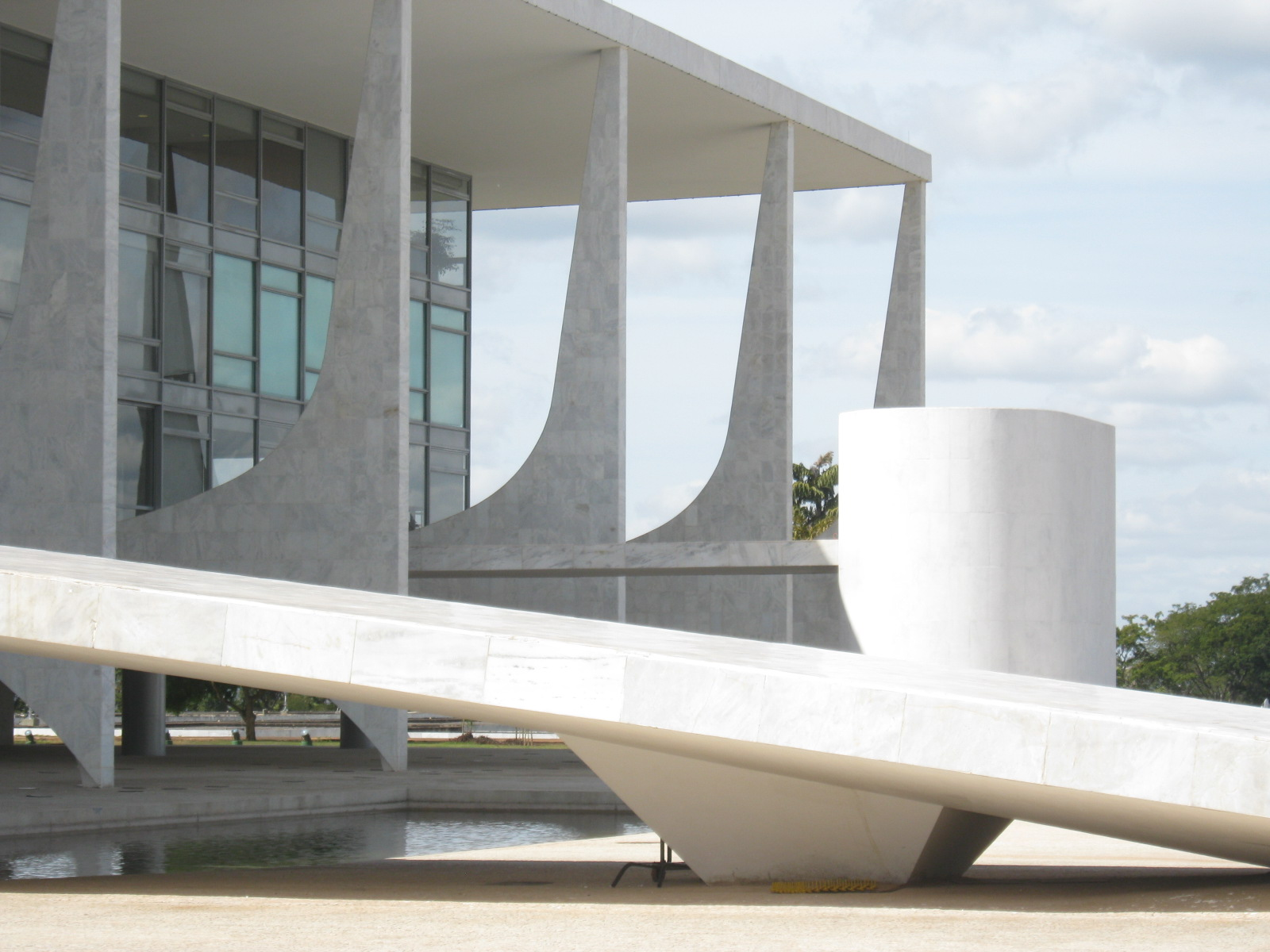
The ramp with the parlatorium (speaker's platform) in the background

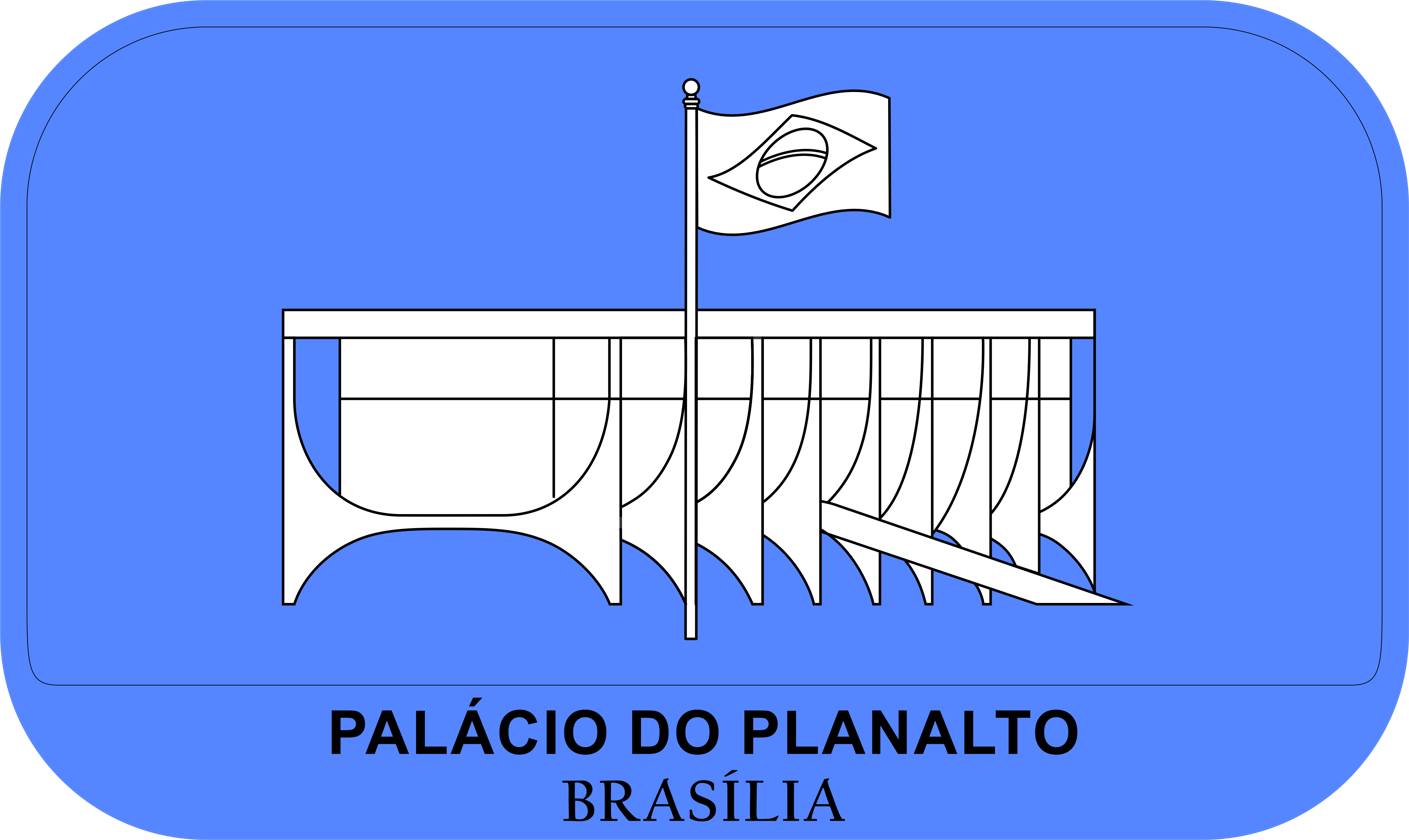
Logo 1962

The presidential palace was a major feature of Costa's plan for the newly established capital city. Niemeyer's idea was to project an image of simplicity and modernity using fine lines and waves to compose the columns and exterior structures. The longitudinal lines of the palace are kept by a sequence of columns whose design is a variation of those at the Palácio da Alvorada, although they were arranged transversely to the body of the building. The palace's façade is also composed by two strong elements: the ramp leading to the hall and the parlatorium (speaker's platform), from where the president and foreign heads of state can address the public at the Three Powers Plaza.

A reflecting pool was built in 1991 to increase security around the palace and to balance humidity levels during the long dry season in Brasília. It has an approximate area of 1,635 square metres (17,600 ft^{2}), holding 1,900 cubic metres (67,000 ft^{3}) of water, with a depth of 110 centimetres (3.6 ft). Several Japanese carp live in the pool.

== Layout and amenities ==
The Palace has an area of 36,000 square metres (390,000 ft^{2}). The main building has four floors above ground and one floor underground. The heliport is located by the north façade of the building.

=== First floor ===
The first floor consists of the main reception area, access control and security, entrance hall and press office. The large entrance hall is used frequently for temporary exhibitions on themes related to the federal government's programs. The hall features a sculpture by Franz Weissman and three sculptures by Zezinho de Tracunhaém. Also located on the first floor is the Presidential Gallery, housing the official portraits of the former presidents of Brazil.

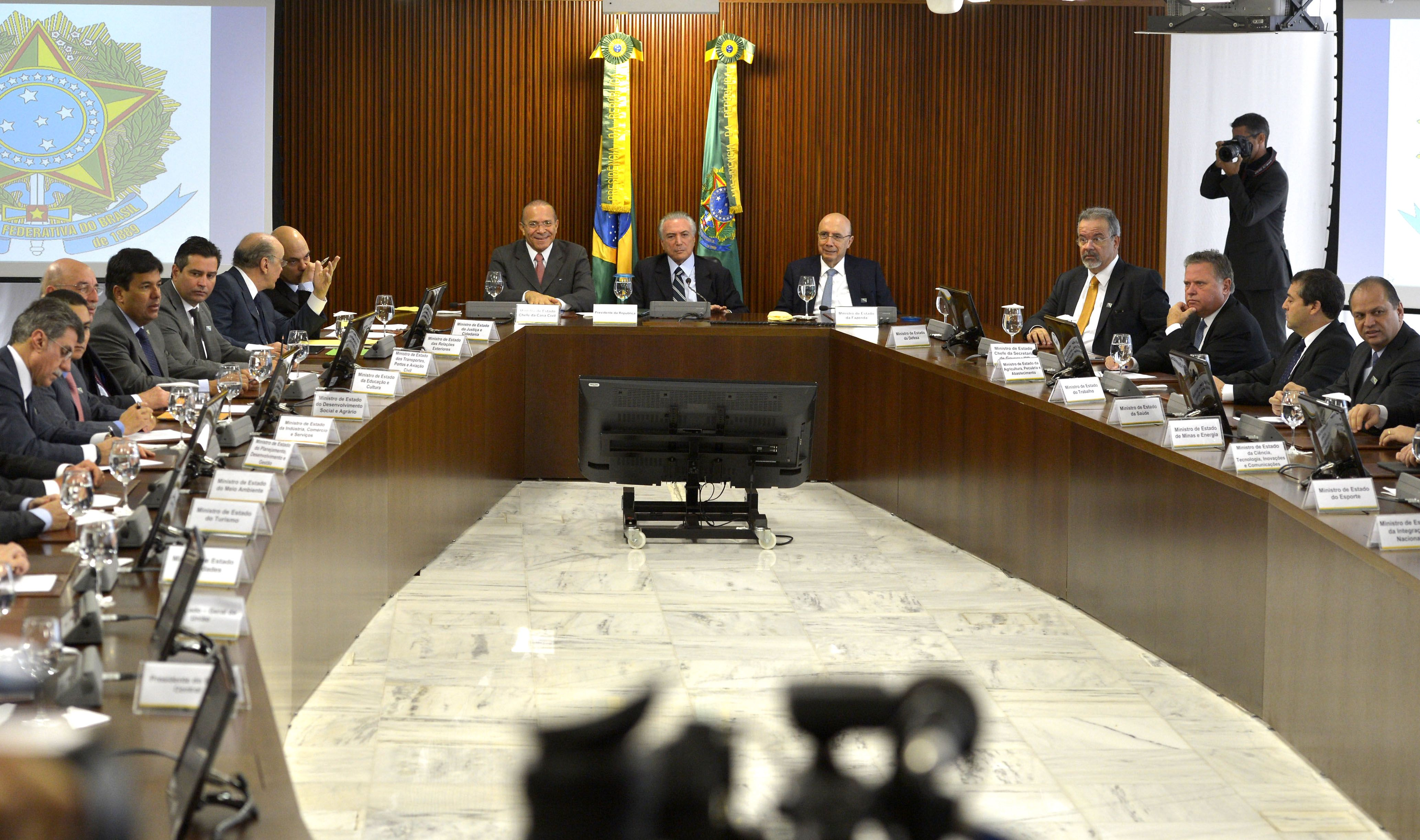
The Supreme Meeting Room, on the second floor of the Palace

=== Second floor ===
The second floor houses the East, Noble and West rooms, as well as the Supreme Meeting Room and Press Secretariat. The East Room is where the president signs decrees and other pieces of legislation. The Noble Room, also called the Mirror Hall, is the largest in the palace. It is used for large ceremonies, with a capacity to hold 1,000 guests. The highlights in this hall are Haroldo Barroso's sculpture Evoluções and Djanira da Motta e Silva's painting Os Orixás. The West Room was designed for medium-sized events, with a capacity to hold from 300 to 500 people. Due to its ample size and generous ceiling height, it is primarily used for events based on international themes. A large panel created by Roberto Burle Marx decorates the area. The Supreme Meeting Room was built in 1990 and is normally used for ministerial, government and presidential meetings.

=== Third floor ===
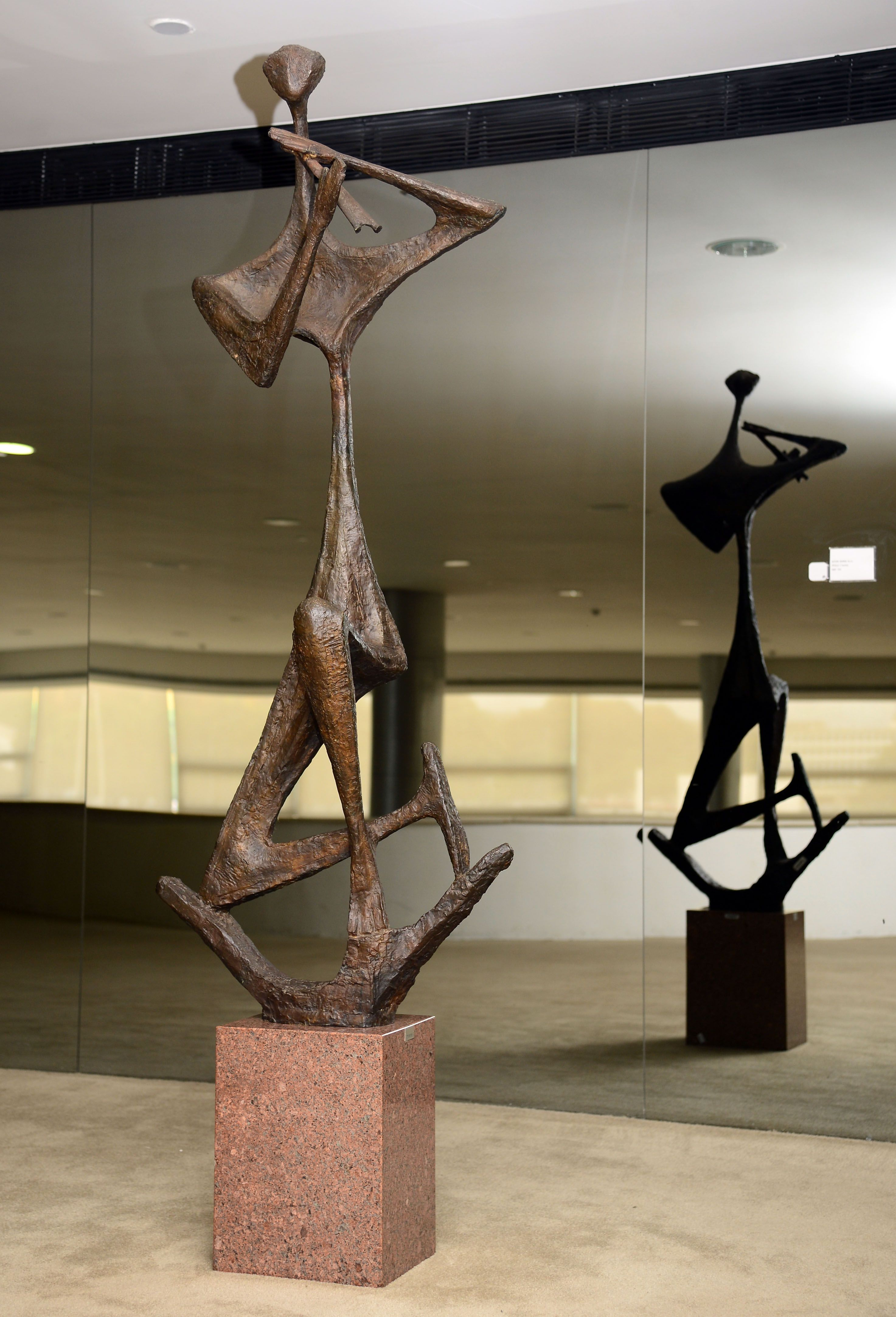
O Flautista, bronze sculpture by Bruno Giorgi before the events of 8 January 2023

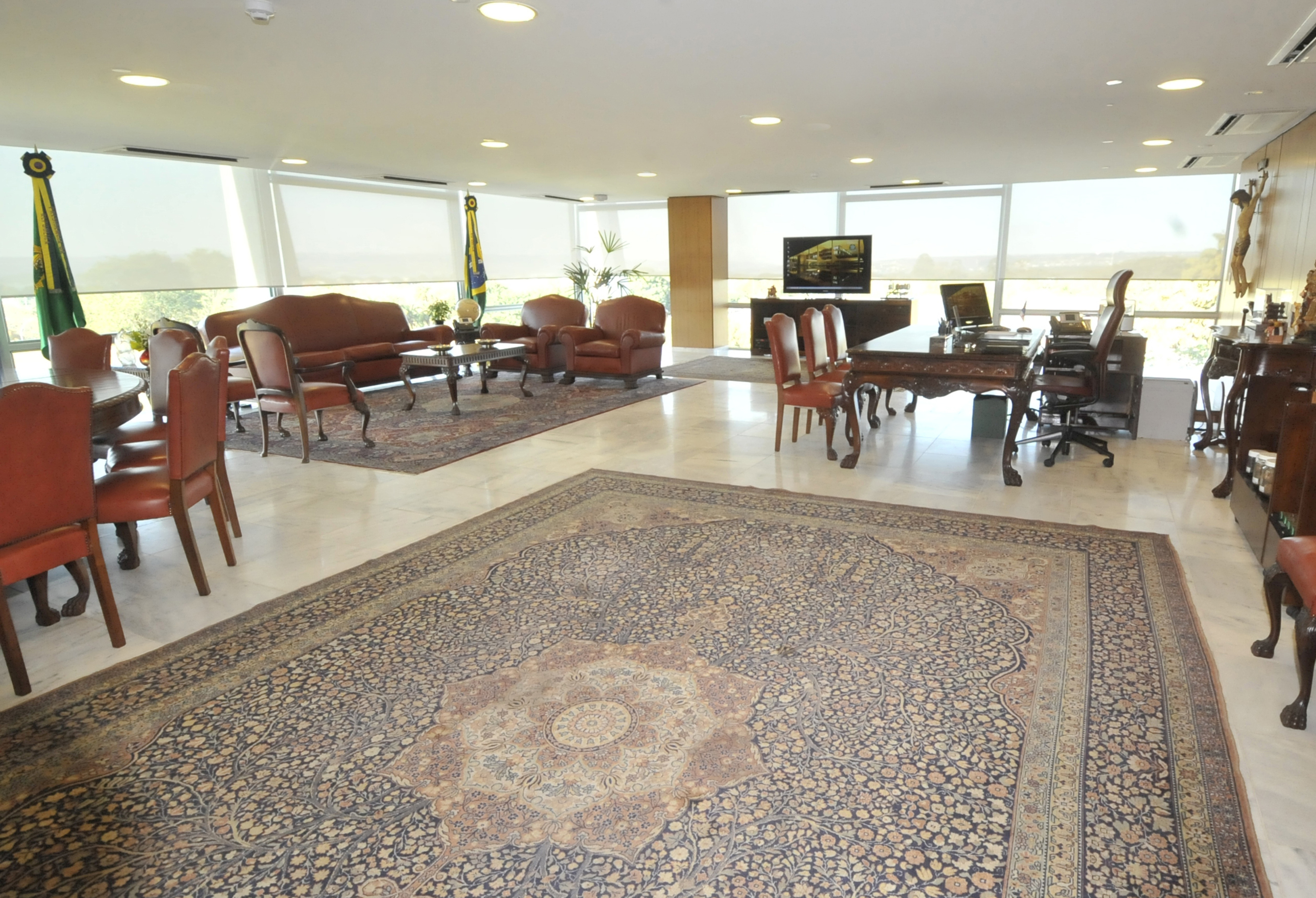
The Presidential Office, on the third floor, after restoration (as decorated in 2010 during Luiz Inácio Lula da Silva's first administration)

The third floor houses the office of the president and their senior staff. It also houses the mezzanine, a large area composed of waiting rooms and a circulation area between the Noble Room, the presidential office and the offices of the senior advisors. The waiting rooms are decorated with furniture by Sergio Rodrigues and Oscar Niemeyer, and paintings by Emiliano Di Cavalcanti, Firmino Saldanha, Frans Krajcberg, Geraldo de Barros and Frank Schaeffer. The bronze sculpture called O Flautista, by Bruno Giorgi, used to ornament the area but was destroyed during the invasion of Congress on 8 January 2023.

The president's office consists of three separate environments: office, meeting room and guest room. The president's office is decorated with modernist Brazilian furniture dating from the 1940s to the 1960s, and silverware from the Catete Palace. The highlights in this room are two large paintings by Djanira da Motta e Silva: Colhendo Bananas and Praia do Nordeste. The meeting room is used for private meetings between the president and members of their direct staff. The guest room is used for formal meetings between the president and foreign heads of state and government.

=== Fourth floor ===
The fourth floor contains a large lounge area and the offices of senior government officials, including the Chief of Staff and the Chief of the Institutional Security Cabinet. The lounge area was created during the 2010 restoration and is decorated with modernist Brazilian furniture from the 1960s. Highlights in the lounge include: a tapestry by Alberto Nicola; a draft of Tiradentes' bust, by Bruno Giorgi; and Cena Indígena, by Giovanni Oppido. Two large panels by Athos Bulcão are also seen on the side walls that lead to the lounge.

== Public access and security ==
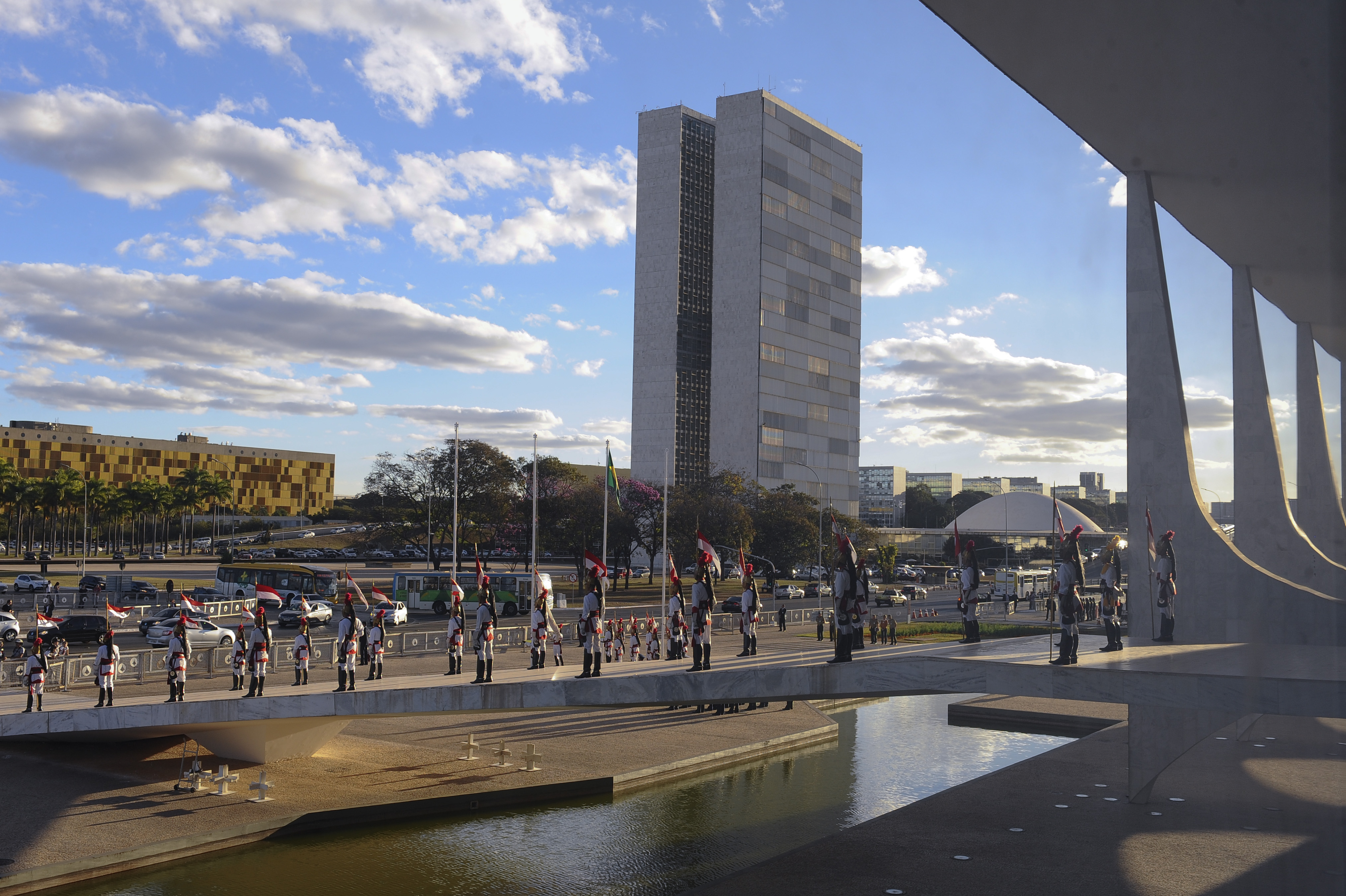
The Independence Dragoons stand guard outside the Palácio do Planalto.

The Palace is open to public visitation on Sundays, from 9:30 am to 2 pm. Guided tours last 20 minutes. During the week, access to the building is restricted to authorised personnel. It is difficult to see the president, as they are often escorted into the Palace through the north entrance or arrive by helicopter. The ramp in front of the Palace is only used during special ceremonies, such as presidential inaugurations and state visits by foreign heads of state and government.

The building is protected by the Presidential Guard Battalion and by the 1st Guard Cavalry Regiment ('Independence Dragoons'), of the Brazilian Army. The ceremonial guard sentry duties are rotated among those two units every six months, and a change of the guard ceremony takes place to mark the rotation.

== Gallery ==
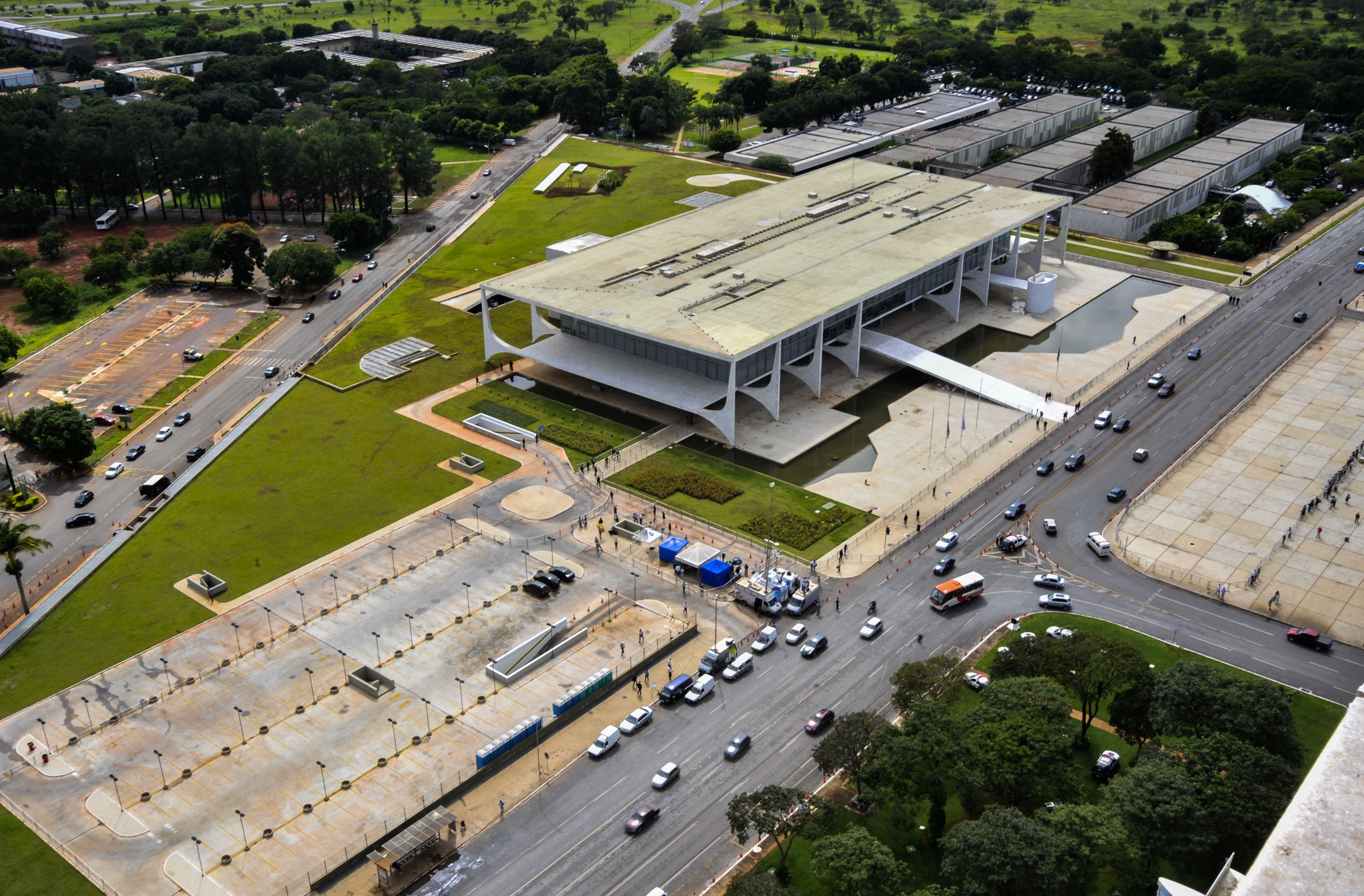
Bird's eye view of the Planalto

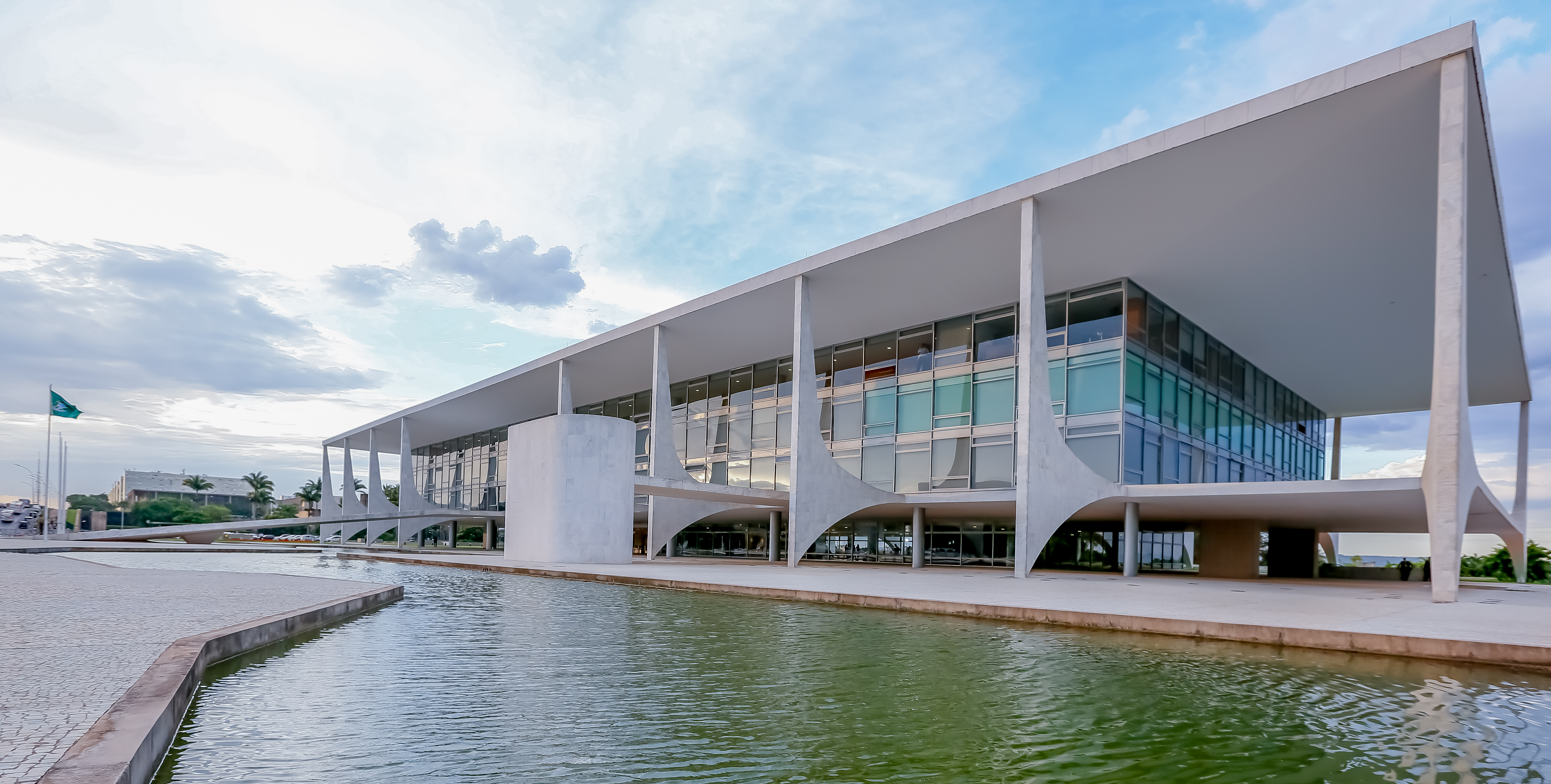
Front façade with the reflecting pool

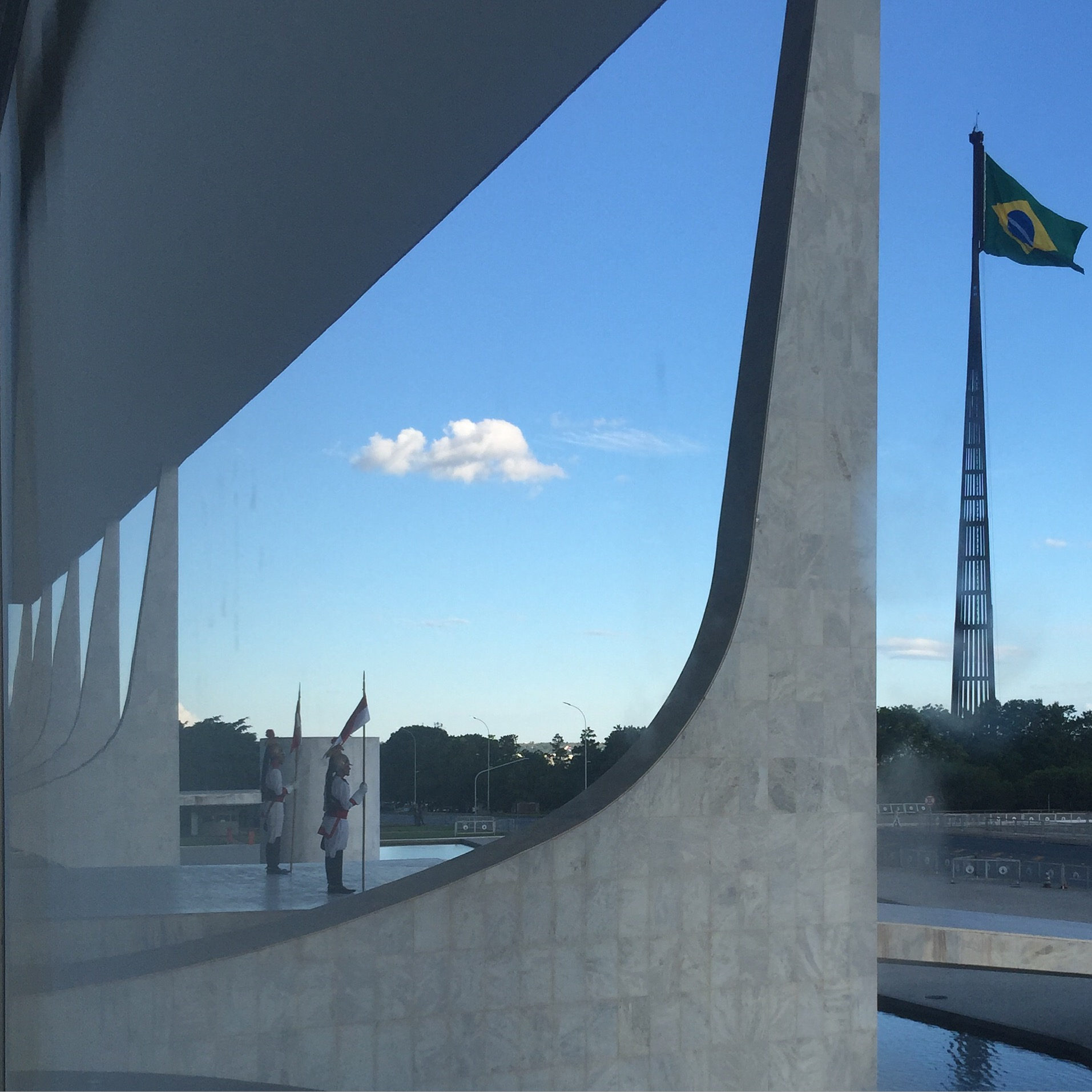
Detail of columns

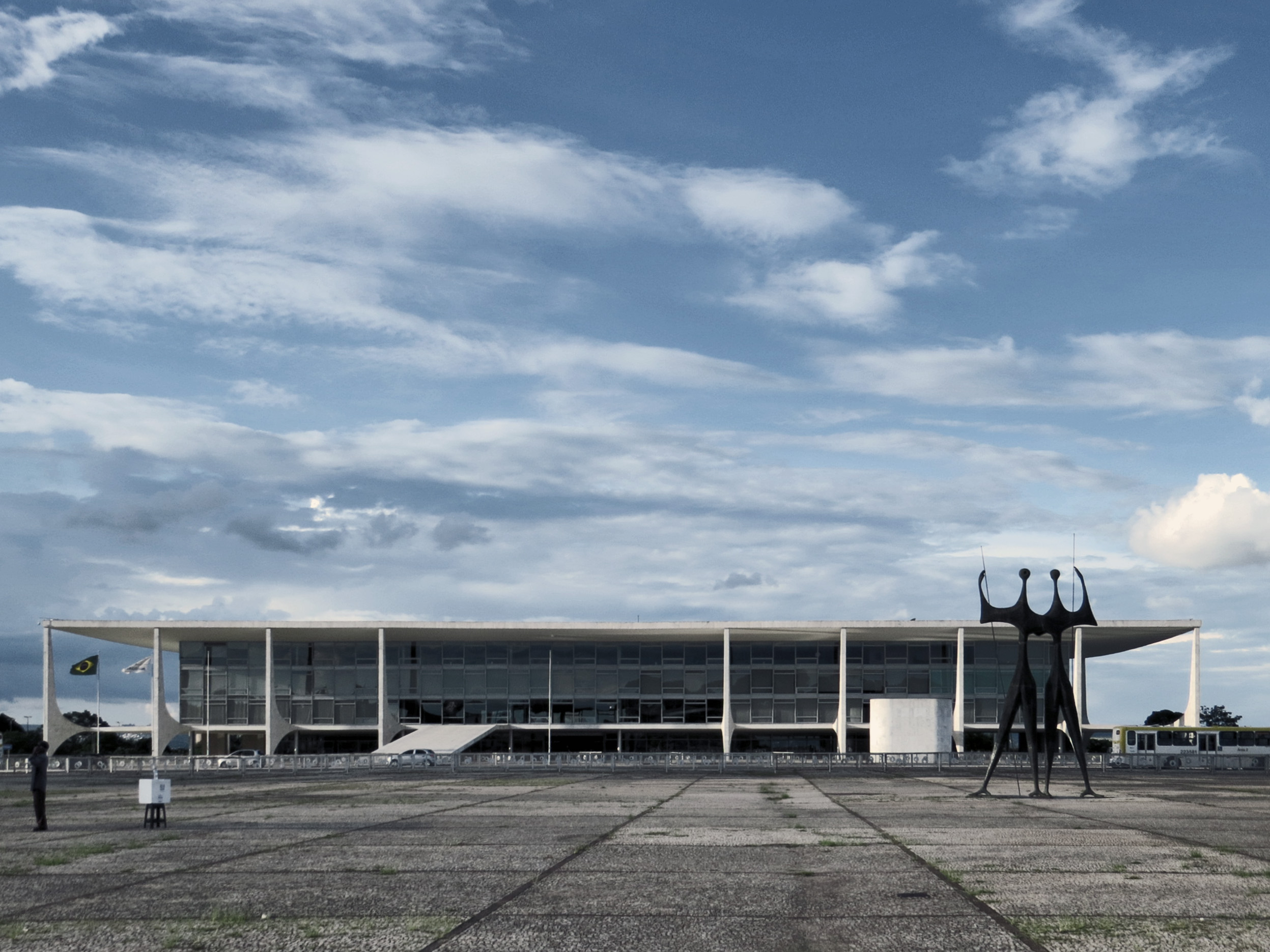
Planalto from Três Poderes Plaza

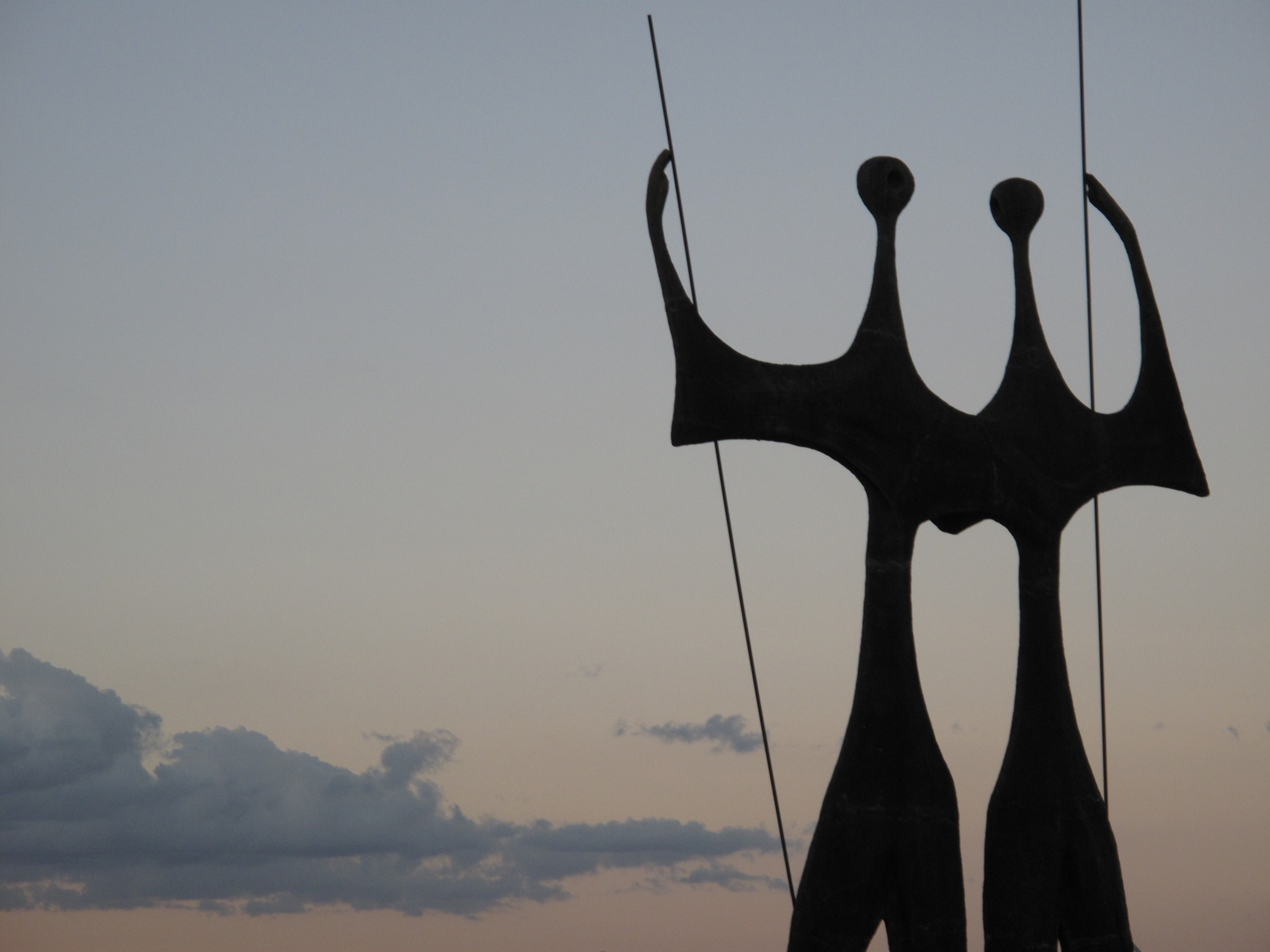
Os Candangos sculpture in front of the Planalto

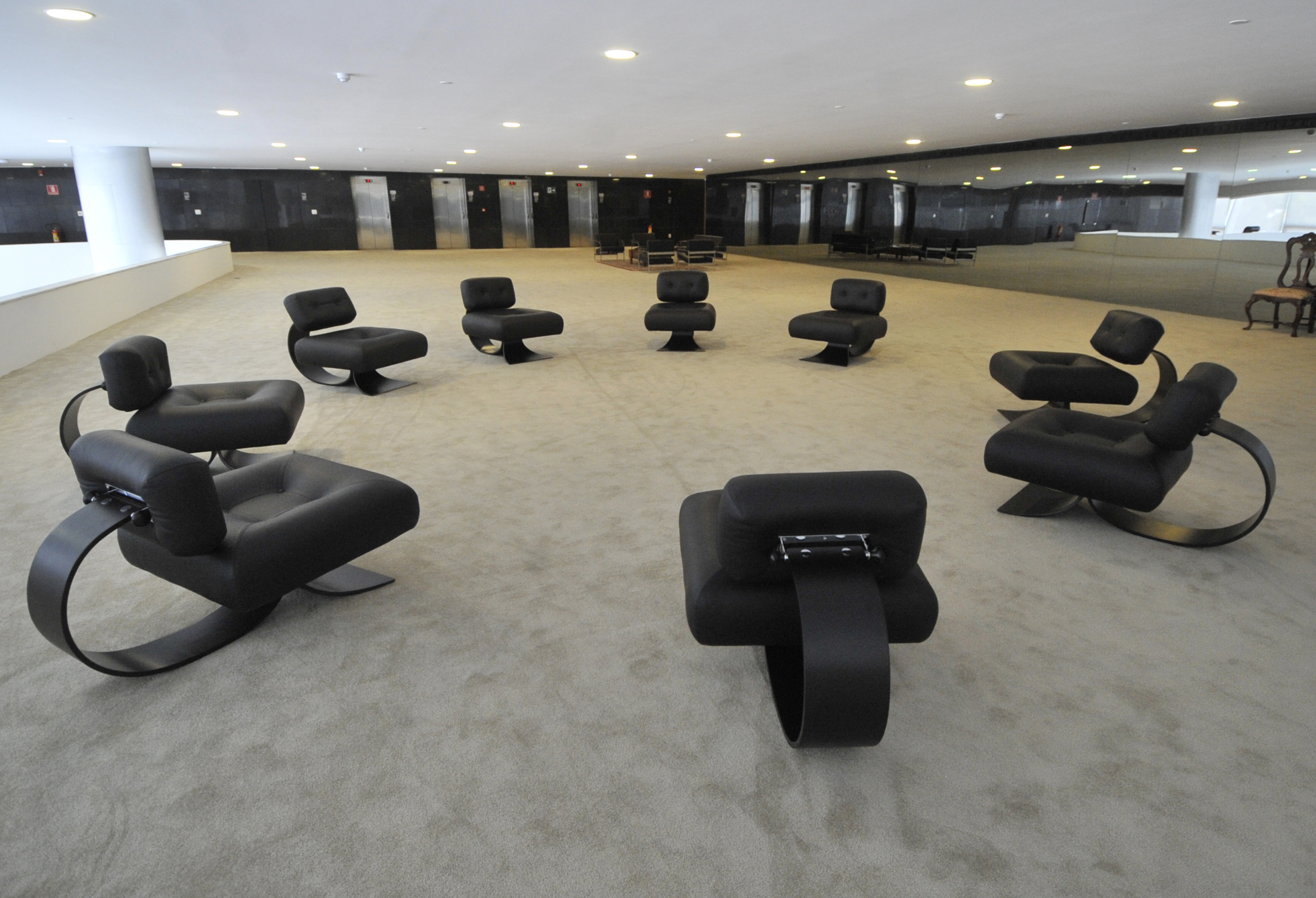
Reception area

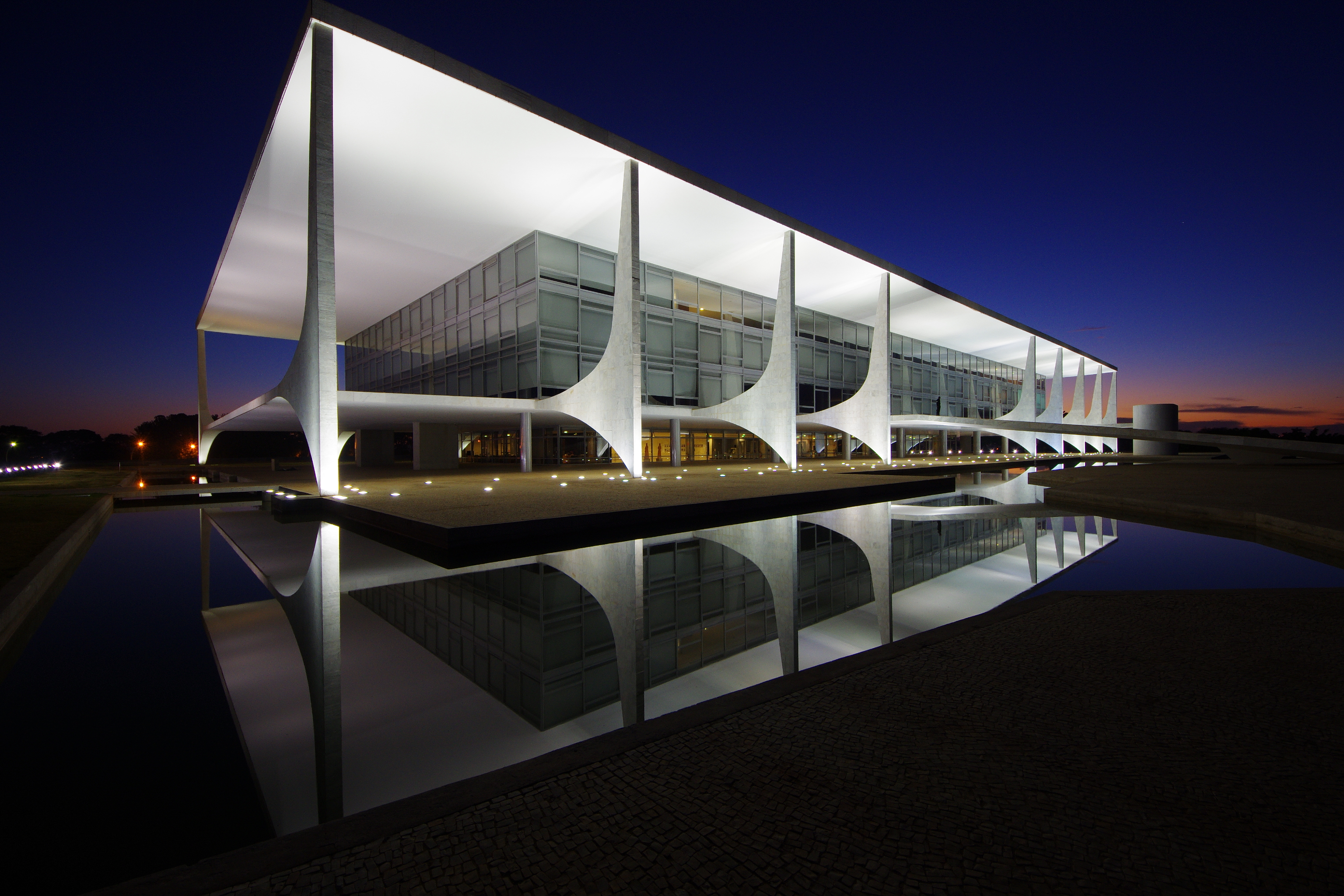
Reflecting pool at night

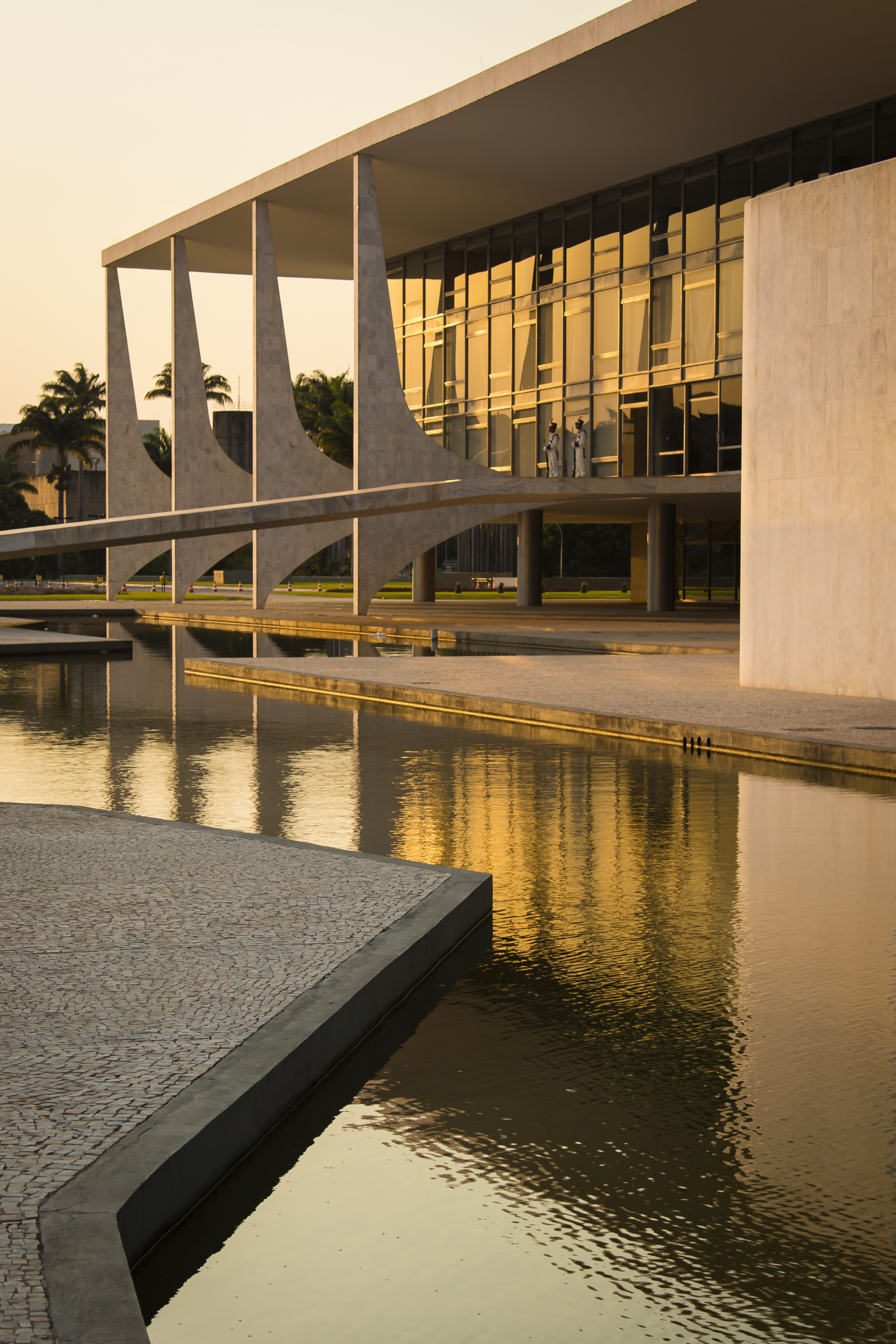
The Planalto at dusk

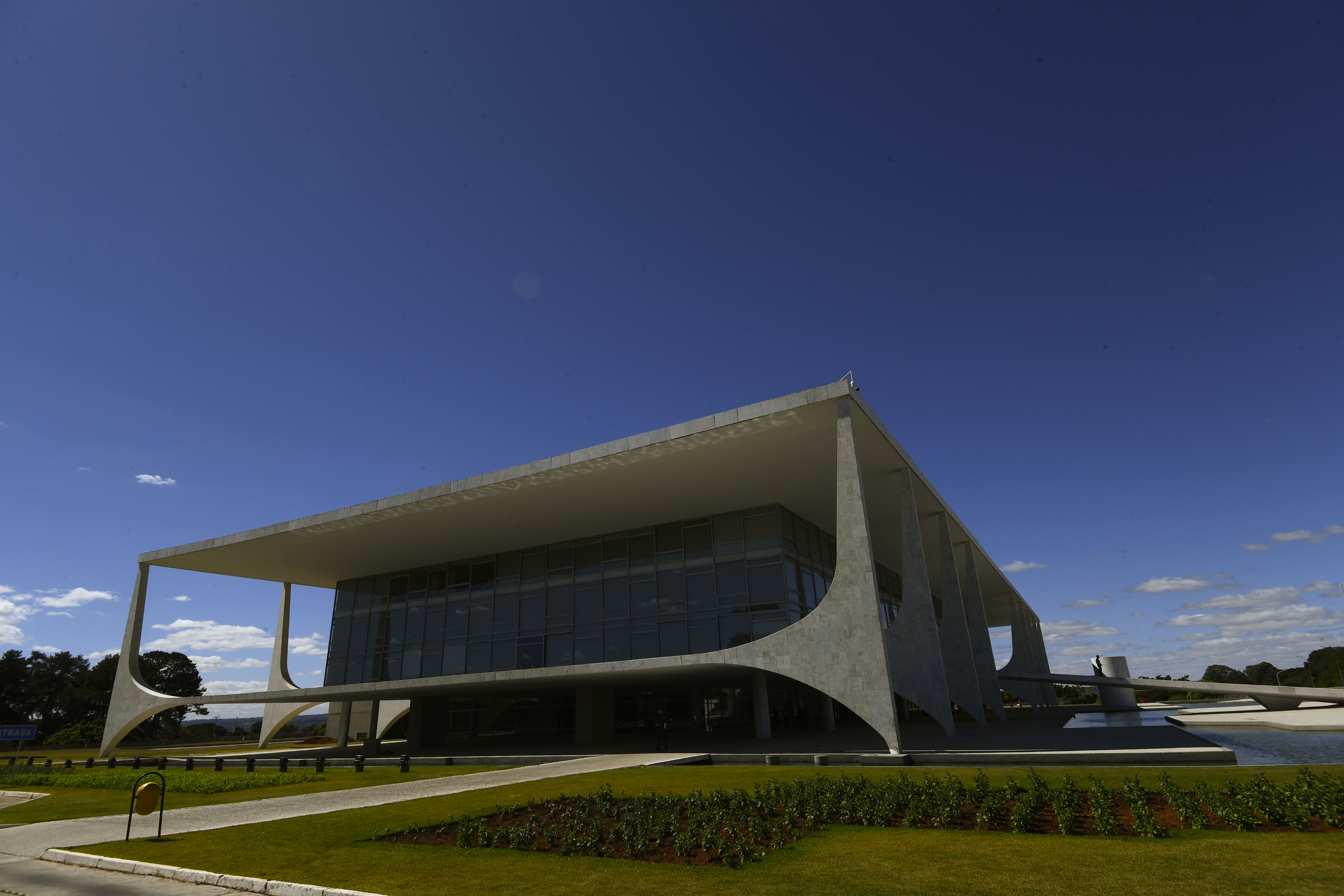
Planalto in 2020

== See also ==
- Granja do Torto
- Rio Negro Palace
- Paço Imperial
- Palace of São Cristóvão
- Petrópolis Imperial Palace
- List of Oscar Niemeyer works
- 2023 invasion of the Brazilian Congress
