= Order of precedence in Brazil =

Relative preeminence of officials for ceremonial purposes

The order of precedence in Brazil is a symbolic hierarchy of officials used to direct protocol. It is regulated by Presidential Decree number 70.274 of March 9, 1972, signed by former President Emilio Medici. The following order applies to ceremonies hosted by the federal government.

This formal order of precedence was established during the military dictatorship, and hasn't been amended after the country's return to democracy in the 1980s. However, changes have informally been introduced to it, so that the de jure precedence no longer corresponds to the de facto arrangements that prevail in current practice. For instance, the head of the military cabinet, the head of the intelligence service and general officers of the Armed Forces no longer enjoy a precedence as high as is assigned to them by the 1972 Decree.

Other modifications of the order of precedence arise from the fact that certain officers, such as the Chief of Staff to the President, the Solicitor-General, etc., have been granted by law the status of Ministers of State, and so the holders of such officers now have a higher rank than they would have otherwise.

The order of precedence is only used to indicate ceremonial protocol; it does not reflect the co-equal status of the branches of government under the Constitution, and is not an actual hierarchy. The ranking of Brazilian officers in the Order of Precedence also does not reflect the place of those officers in the presidential line of succession.

The placement of Roman Catholic cardinals in the order of precedence in spite of the separation of church and state in force in Brazil is justified on the grounds that they are princes of a foreign power (the Holy See) residing in Brazil and/or holding Brazilian nationality. However cardinals are no longer ascribed as high a precedence as the 1972 Decree ascribes to them, being in current practice outranked for instance by the presidents of the Chamber of Deputies, of the Federal Senate, of the Federal Supreme Court and by the attorney general of the Republic, as well as by former presidents of the Republic and by the Ministers of State.

== Order of precedence according to the Decree ==
1. The President of the Republic (Luiz Inácio Lula da Silva)
2. The Vice President of the Republic (Geraldo Alckmin)
3. Brazilian cardinals (by seniority of assuming title)
  1. Odilo Pedro Scherer (Archbishop of São Paulo)
  2. Raymundo Damasceno Assis (Archbishop Emeritus of Aparecida)
  3. João Braz de Aviz (Prefect emeritus of Congregation for Institutes of Consecrated Life and Societies of Apostolic Life in Vatican City)
  4. Orani João Tempesta (Archbishop of Rio de Janeiro)
  5. Sérgio da Rocha (Archbishop of Salvador)
  6. Leonardo Ulrich Steiner (Archbishop of Manaus)
  7. Paulo Cezar Costa (Archbishop of Brasília)
  8. Jaime Spengler (Archbishop of Porto Alegre)
4. Ambassadors Extraordinary and Plenipotentiary of foreign diplomatic mission to Brazil
5. The President of the Federal Senate and of the National Congress (Davi Alcolumbre)
6. The President of the Chamber of Deputies (Hugo Motta)
7. The President of the Supreme Federal Court (Edson Fachin)
8. Former Presidents of Brazil (by seniority of assuming office, as long as they don't have other public office)
  1. José Sarney (21 April 1985 – 15 March 1990)
  2. Fernando Collor de Mello (15 March 1990 – 29 December 1992)
  3. Fernando Henrique Cardoso (1 January 1995 – 31 December 2002)
  4. Dilma Rousseff (1 January 2011 – 31 August 2016)
  5. Michel Temer (31 August 2016 – 31 December 2018)
  6. Jair Bolsonaro (1 January 2019 – 31 December 2022)
9. Former Vice Presidents of Brazil (by seniority of assuming office, as long as they don't have other public office)
  1. Hamilton Mourão (1 January 2019 – 31 December 2022)
10. Ministers of State (by order of creation)
  1. Minister of Justice and Public Security (Wellington Lima e Silva)
  2. Minister of Foreign Affairs (Mauro Vieira)
  3. Minister of Finance (Dario Durigan)
  4. Minister of Agriculture and Livestock (André de Paula)
  5. Minister of Education (Leonardo Barchini)
  6. Minister of Labour and Employment (Luiz Marinho)
  7. Minister of Health (Alexandre Padilha)
  8. Minister of Mines and Energy (Alexandre Silveira)
  9. Minister of Planning and Budget (Bruno Moretti)
  10. Minister of Communications (Frederico Siqueira)
  11. Minister of Environment and Climate Change (João Paulo Capobianco)
  12. Minister of Science, Technology and Innovation (Luciana Santos)
  13. Minister of Human Rights and the Citizenship (Janine Mello)
  14. Minister of Defence (José Múcio)
  15. Minister of Tourism (Gustavo Feliciano)
  16. Minister of Integration and the Regional Development (Waldez Góes)
  17. Minister of Indigenous People (Eloy Terena)
  18. Minister of Racial Equality (Rachel Barros)
  19. Minister of Women (Márcia Lopes)
  20. Minister of Transport (George Santoro)
  21. Minister of Ports and Airports (Tomé Franca)
  22. Minister of Culture (Margareth Menezes)
  23. Minister of Sports (Paulo Henrique Cordeiro)
  24. Minister of Development and Social Assistance, Family and Fight against Hunger (Wellington Dias)
  25. Minister of Management and Innovation in Public Services (Esther Dweck)
  26. Minister of Fishing and Aquaculture (Édipo Araújo)
  27. Minister of Social Security (Wolney Queiroz)
  28. Minister of Agrarian Development and Family Agriculture (Fernanda Machiaveli)
  29. Minister of Cities (Vladimir Lima)
  30. Minister of Development, Industry, Trade and Services (Márcio Elias Rosa)
  31. Minister of Entrepreneurship, Microenterprise and Small Business (Tadeu Alencar)
11. The Head of the Institutional Security Bureau (Marcos Antonio Amaro dos Santos)
12. The Chief of Staff (Miriam Belchior)
13. The Director of the Brazilian Intelligence Agency (Luiz Fernando Corrêa)
14. The Commanders of the Armed Forces (by creation of branch)
  1. Commander of the Brazilian Navy (Adm. Marcos Sampaio Olsen)
  2. Commander of the Brazilian Army (Gen. Tomás Ribeiro Paiva)
  3. Commander of the Brazilian Air Force (Lt. Brig. Marcelo Kanitz Damasceno)
  4. Chief of the Joint Staff of the Armed Forces (Adm. Renato Rodrigues de Aguiar Freire)
  5. Secretary-General of the Ministry of Defence (Luiz Henrique Pochyly da Costa)
15. The Attorney General of the Union (Jorge Messias)
16. Foreign envoys
17. The President of the Superior Electoral Court (Nunes Marques)
18. Justices of the Supreme Federal Court
  1. Gilmar Mendes
  2. Cármen Lúcia
  3. Dias Toffoli
  4. Luiz Fux
  5. Alexandre de Moraes
  6. Nunes Marques
  7. André Mendonça
  8. Cristiano Zanin
  9. Flávio Dino
19. Prosecutor General of the Republic (Paulo Gonet Branco)
20. Governors of State (by creation date)
  1. Governor of Bahia (Jerônimo Rodrigues)
  2. Governor of Rio de Janeiro (Ricardo Couto)
  3. Governor of Maranhão (Carlos Brandão)
  4. Governor of Pará (Hana Ghassan)
  5. Governor of Pernambuco (Raquel Lyra)
  6. Governor of Minas Gerais (Mateus Simões)
  7. Governor of São Paulo (Tarcísio de Freitas)
  8. Governor of Goiás (Daniel Vilela)
  9. Governor of Mato Grosso (Otaviano Pivetta)
  10. Governor of Rio Grande do Sul (Eduardo Leite)
  11. Governor of Ceará (Elmano de Freitas)
  12. Governor of Paraíba (Lucas Ribeiro)
  13. Governor of Espírito Santo (Ricardo Ferraço)
  14. Governor of Piauí (Rafael Fonteles)
  15. Governor of Rio Grande do Norte (Fátima Bezerra)
  16. Governor of Santa Catarina (Jorginho Mello)
  17. Governor of Alagoas (Paulo Dantas)
  18. Governor of Sergipe (Fábio Mitidieri)
  19. Governor of Amazonas (Roberto Cidade)
  20. Governor of Paraná (Ratinho Júnior)
  21. Governor of Acre (Mailza Gomes)
  22. Governor of Mato Grosso do Sul (Eduardo Riedel)
  23. Governor of Rondônia (Marcos Rocha)
  24. Governor of Tocantins (Wanderlei Barbosa)
  25. Governor of Roraima (Soldado Sampaio)
  26. Governor of Amapá (Clécio Luís)
21. The Governor of the Federal District (Celina Leão)
22. Senators
23. Federal Deputies
24. Admirals of the Brazilian Navy
25. Marshals of the Brazilian Army
26. Marshals of the air of the Brazilian Air Force
27. Admirals of the fleet of the Brazilian Navy
28. Generals of the Brazilian Army
29. Ambassadors
30. Lt. Brigadiers of the Brazilian Air Force
31. The President of the Superior Court of Justice (Luis Felipe Salomão)
32. The President of the Superior Military Court (Maria Elizabeth Rocha)
33. The President of the Federal Court of Accounts (Vital do Rêgo Filho)
34. The President of the Superior Labour Court (Luiz Philippe Vieira de Mello Filho)
35. Justices of the Superior Electoral Court
36. Chargé d'affaires of foreign countries
37. Justices of the Superior Justice Court
38. Justices of the Superior Military Court
39. Justices of the Superior Labour Court
40. Vice admirals of the Brazilian Navy
41. Divisional generals of the Brazilian Army
42. Major-brigadiers of the Brazilian Air Force
43. Catholic Archbishops
44. The President of the Justice Court of the Federal District and Territories (Jair Oliveira Soares)
45. Secretaries-General of the Federal Senate and the Chamber of Deputies
46. Prosecutors of the Republic in the States of the Union
47. Prosecutors-General in the States of the Union
48. Directors of the Ministries of State
49. Deans of Federal Universities
50. The Director General of the Federal Police of Brazil (Andrei Rodrigues)
51. The President of the Central Bank of Brazil (Gabriel Galípolo)
52. The Chairwoman of the Banco do Brasil (Tarciana Medeiros)
53. The President of the Brazilian Development Bank (Aloizio Mercadante)
54. The Secretary of the Federal Revenue Service (Robinson Sakiyama)
55. Chairperson of Federal Savings Bank (Carlos Vieira)
56. Mayors of cities with more than 1,000,000 inhabitants
57. Counter admirals of the Brazilian Navy
58. Brigadier-Generals of the Brazilian Army
59. Brigadiers of the Brazilian Air Force
60. Vice Governors of the States of the Union
61. Presidents of the Legislative Assemblies of the States of the Union
62. Presidents of the Justice Courts of the States of the Union
63. Chair of the Permanent Committee of the Book of the Merit
64. Chair of the Brazilian Academy of Letters (Merval Pereira)
65. Chair of the Brazilian Academy of Sciences (Luiz Davidovich)
66. Chair of the Brazilian Association of Press (Paulo Jerônimo)
67. Deans of State and Private Universities
68. State Secretaries
69. Catholic Bishops
70. Presidents of Employers' and Workers' Confederations in national scale
71. Directors of Central Bank of Brazil
72. Directors of Bank of Brazil
73. Directors of Brazilian Development Bank
74. Captains of sea and war of the Brazilian Navy
75. Colonels of the Brazilian Army
76. Colonels of the Brazilian Air Force
77. State Deputies
78. Commanders of the Military Polices of the States of the Union
79. Desembargadores of the Justice Courts of the States of the Union
80. Foreign consuls
81. Federal Judges
82. Catholic Monsignors
83. Frigate captains of the Brazilian Navy
84. Lt. Colonels of the Brazilian Army
85. Lt. Colonels of the Brazilian Air Force
86. Presidents of Employers' and Workers' Confederations in regional or state scale
87. Presidents of Municipal Chambers in cities with more than 500,000 inhabitants
88. Law Judges
89. Public Prosecutors
90. Department Heads of Federal Universities
91. Mayors of cities with more than 100,000 inhabitants
92. Corvette captains of the Brazilian Navy
93. Majors of the Brazilian Army
94. Majors of the Brazilian Air Force
95. Department Heads of State and Private Universities
96. Presidents of Municipal Chambers of cities with more than 100,000 inhabitants
97. Universities professors
98. Other Mayors
99. Catholic Canons
100. Lt. Captains of the Brazilian Navy
101. Captains of the Brazilian Army
102. Captains of the Brazilian Air Force
103. Presidents of other Municipal Chambers
104. Catholic Priests
105. Principals of High Schools
106. Aldermen
