= Ministries of Brazil =

Primary unit of the executive branch of the federal government of Brazil

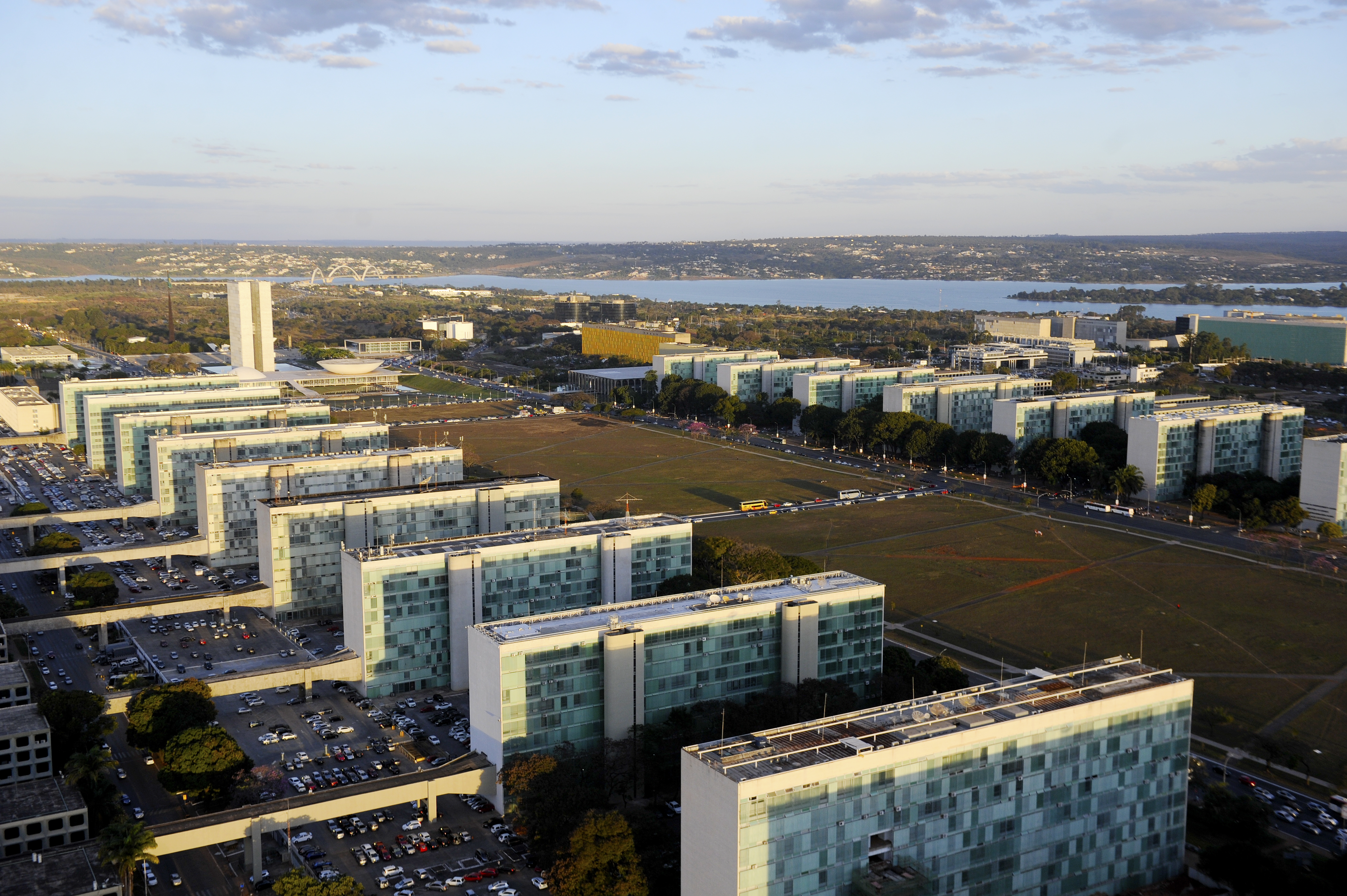
The Ministries Esplanade is the location of all the ministries headquarters, excepts for secretariats and cabinet-level offices.

The ministries of Brazil are organs of the federal government of Brazil. Since January 2025, there are 38 executive departments, being 31 ministries, 4 secretariats and 4 cabinet-level offices. Each ministry is responsible for a specific area and is headed by a minister or a chief-minister. The office head is appointed by the President of the Republic.

== Execution and guidelines ==
Among the ministries that compose the Federal Government, the oldest is the Justice (currently named Justice and Public Security), established on 3 July 1822 by Regent Prince Dom Pedro, named as State Secretariat of Justice Affairs.

The ministries support the President of the Republic on the exercise of the Executive Branch. The Ministry of Foreign Affairs, for example, advises in the formulation and execution of Brazilian foreign policy.

Ministries develop regulations, monitor and evaluate federal programs, and formulate and implement policies for the sectors they represent. They are also responsible for establishing strategies, guidelines, and priorities in the allocation of public resources.

The ministries must have, at least, a minister cabinet, executive-secretariat (except for the Ministry of Defence and the Ministry of Foreign Affairs), legal advisors, ombudsman and secretariats.

According to Article 37, clause XVI of the Federal Constitution, the paid accumulation of public positions is prohibited. Parliamentarians can assume as head of ministries, but need to take a temporary leave from their respective legislative house, without needing to resign from the position (Article 56, clause I).

== Current ministries ==
Ministry	Logo	Acronym	Formed	Total budget (2025)	Head	
Ministry	Logo	Acronym	Formed	Total budget (2025)	Title	Titleholder
Agrarian Development and Family Agriculture		MDA	24 August 1982	R$ 5.97 billion	Minister of Agrarian Development	Fernanda Machiaveli
Agriculture and Livestock		MAPA	28 July 1860	R$ 10.97 billion	Minister of Agriculture	André de Paula
Cities		MCID	1 January 2003	R$ 13.9 billion	Minister of Cities	Antônio Vladimir Lima
Communications		MCom	25 February 1967	R$ 2.33 billion	Minister of Communications	Frederico Siqueira
Culture		MinC	15 March 1985	R$ 3.257 billion	Minister of Culture	Margareth Menezes
Defense		MD	10 June 1999	R$ 141.9 billion	Minister of Defence	José Múcio
Development, Industry, Trade and Services		MDICS	31 January 1961	R$ 3.802 billion	Minister of Development	Márcio Elias Rosa
Development and Social Assistance, Family and Fight against Hunger		MDS	23 January 2004	R$ 300.99 billion	Minister of Development and Social Assistance	Wellington Dias
Education		MEC	14 November 1930	R$ 233.35 billion	Minister of Education	Leonardo Barchini
Entrepreneurship, Microenterprise and Small Business		MEMEPP	1 April 2013	R$ 213.2 million	Minister of Entrepreneurship	Tadeu de Alencar
Environment and Climate Change		MMA	15 March 1985	R$ 4.59 billion	Minister of Environment	João Paulo Capobianco
Finance		MF	25 March 1824	R$ 22.43 billion	Minister of Finance	Dario Durigan
Fishing and Aquaculture		MPESCA	1 January 2003	R$ 262.3 million	Minister of Fishing	Édipo Araújo
Foreign Affairs		MRE	13 November 1823	R$ 5.67 billion	Minister of Foreign Affairs	Mauro Vieira
Health		MS	25 July 1953	R$ 261.09 billion	Minister of Health	Alexandre Padilha
Human Rights and Citizenship		MDHC	17 April 1997	R$ 401.6 million	Minister of Human Rights	Janine Mello
Indigenous Peoples		MPI	1 January 2023	R$ 1.35 billion	Minister of Indigenous Peoples	Eloy Terena
Integration and Regional Development		MIDR	19 July 1999	R$ 6.11 billion	Minister of Integration	Waldez Góes
Justice and Public Security		MJSP	3 July 1822	R$ 25.19 billion	Minister of Justice	Wellington Lima e Silva
Labour and Employment		MTE	26 November 1930	R$ 123.69 billion	Minister of Labour	Luiz Marinho
Management and Innovation in Public Services		MGI	1 January 2023	R$ 4.03 billion	Minister of Management	Esther Dweck
Mines and Energy		MME	22 July 1960	R$ 8.02 billion	Minister of Mines and Energy	Alexandre Silveira
Planning and Budget		MPO	25 September 1962	R$ 4.97 billion	Minister of Planning	Bruno Moretti
Ports and Airports		MPOR	15 May 2007	R$ 3.95 billion	Minister of Ports and Airports	Tomé Franca
Racial Equality		MIR	21 March 2003	R$ 192.9 million	Minister of Racial Equality	Rachel Barros
Science, Technology and Innovation		MCTI	15 March 1985	R$ 15.45 billion	Minister of Science and Technology	Luciana Santos
Social Security		MPS	2 May 1974	R$ 1.15 trillion	Minister of Social Security	Wolney Queiroz
Sports		MESP	1 January 1995	R$ 1.15 billion	Minister of Sports	Paulo Cordeiro Perna
Tourism		MTur	1 January 2003	R$ 1.6 billion	Minister of Tourism	Gustavo Feliciano
Transport		MT	17 December 1892	R$ 18.42 billion	Minister of Transport	George Santoro
Women		MMulheres	1 January 2003	R$ 255.2 million	Minister of Women	Márcia Lopes
Secretariats with ministry status
Secretariat of Social Communication		Secom	7 June 1979	—N/a	Secretary of Social Communication	Sidônio Palmeira
Secretariat-General of the Presidency		SGPR	15 March 1990	—N/a	Secretary-General of the Presidency	Guilherme Boulos
Secretariat of Institutional Affairs		SRI	20 July 2005	—N/a	Secretary of Institutional Affairs	José Guimarães
Cabinet-level offices
Attorneyship General of the Union		AGU	12 February 1993	R$ 5.14 billion	Attorney General	Jorge Messias
Civil House		CC	1 December 1938	—N/a	Chief of Staff	Miriam Belchior
Comptrollership General of the Union		CGU	3 April 2001	R$ 1.66 billion	Comptroller General	Vinícius Marques de Carvalho
Institutional Security Bureau		GSI	1 November 1930	—N/a	Secretary of Institutional Security	Marcos Antonio Amaro dos Santos

== See also ==
- British government departments
- Canadian Federal government departments
- Cabinet of Brazil
- Federal government of Brazil
- United States federal executive departments
