= Second cabinet of Lula da Silva =

Members of President Lula da Silva's Cabinet

Lula Cabinet
- Cabinet of Brazil
- 2023–present
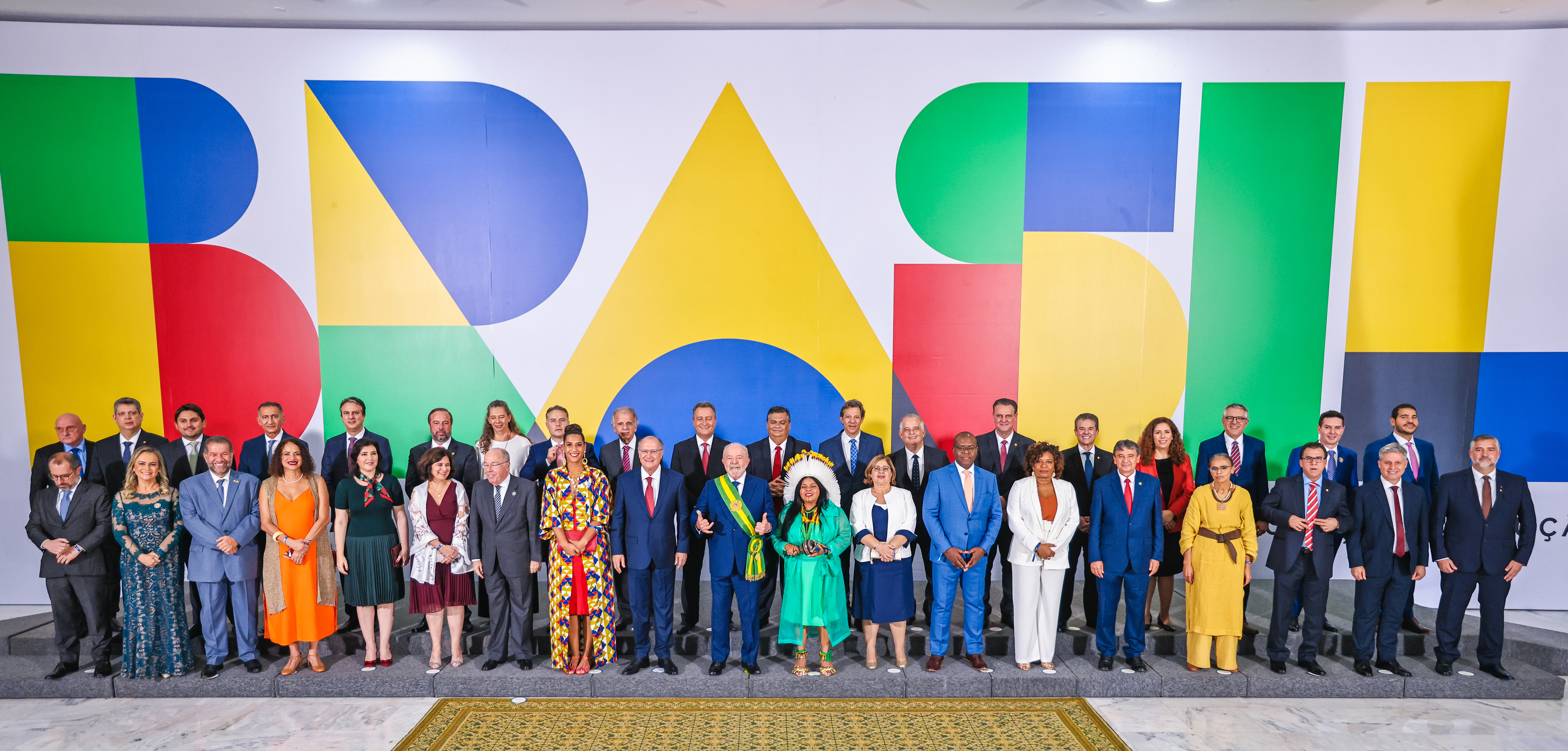
- Cabinet of President Lula da Silva in January 2023
- Date formed: 1 January 2023

People and organisations
- President: Luiz Inácio Lula da Silva
- President's history: Former President of Brazil (2003–2011); Former Federal Deputy from São Paulo (1987–1991)
- Vice President: Geraldo Alckmin
- No. of ministers: 37
- Ministers removed: 9
- Member parties: Government: Brazil of Hope: Workers' Party; Communist Party of Brazil; Green Party; Brazilian Socialist Party PSOL REDE Federation: Socialism and Liberty Party; Sustainability Network; Democratic Labour Party Solidariedade (2023–2026) Avante (2023–2026) Act (2023–2026) Support: Republicans (2024–2025) Progressistas (2024–2025) Brazilian Democratic Movement (2023–2025) Social Democratic Party (2023–2025) Brazil Union (2023-2025)
- Status in legislature: Minority coalition
- Opposition parties: Liberal Party; Podemos; Brazilian Social Democracy Party; Democratic Renewal Party; New Party; Mission Party

History
- Elections: 2022 general election 2026 general election
- Legislature terms: 56th Legislature (31 days); 57th Legislature; 58th Legislature
- Advice and consent: Federal Senate
- Predecessor: Cabinet of Jair Bolsonaro

In December 2022, the final composition of the second Luiz Inácio Lula da Silva's cabinet was announced after weeks of discussions and analysis by the transition cabinet. The first names were unveiled on 9 December.

== Supporting parties ==
Party	Main ideology	Leader
Government parties
Workers' Party (PT)	Social democracy	Edinho Silva
Communist Party of Brazil (PCdoB)	Communism	Luciana Santos
Green Party	Green politics	José Luiz Penna
Brazilian Socialist Party (PSB)	Social democracy	João Campos
Socialism and Liberty Party (PSOL)	Democratic socialism	Paula Coradi
Sustainability Network (REDE)	Environmentalism	Heloísa Helena
Avante	Labourism	Luis Tibé
Out of coalition parties
Social Democratic Party (PSD)	Conservative liberalism	Gilberto Kassab
Brazilian Democratic Movement (MDB)	Big tent	Baleia Rossi
Republicanos	Social conservatism	Marcos Pereira
Solidariedade	Labourism	Paulo Pereira da Silva

== Cabinet ==
Party key	PT	PSB	PDT	MDB	Republicans
Party key	PCdoB	PSOL	REDE	PSD	Military
Party key	UNIÃO	PP	No party		

Portfolio	Portrait	Minister	Took office	Left office	Note
Vice President
Vice President		Geraldo Alckmin	1 January 2023	Incumbent	
Cabinet ministers
Chief of Staff		Rui Costa	1 January 2023	2 April 2026	
Chief of Staff		Miriam Belchior	2 April 2026	Incumbent	
Minister of Finance		Fernando Haddad	1 January 2023	20 March 2026	
Minister of Finance		Dario Durigan	20 March 2026	Incumbent	
Minister of Justice and Public Security		Flávio Dino	1 January 2023	1 February 2024	Senator on leave
Minister of Justice and Public Security		Ricardo Lewandowski	1 February 2024	9 January 2026	
Minister of Justice and Public Security		Manoel Carlos de Almeida Neto	9 January 2026	13 January 2026	Acting minister
Minister of Justice and Public Security		Wellington Lima e Silva	13 January 2026	Incumbent	
Minister of Defense		José Múcio	1 January 2023	Incumbent	
Minister of Foreign Affairs		Mauro Vieira	1 January 2023	Incumbent	
Minister of Planning and Budget		Simone Tebet	1 January 2023	31 March 2026	
Minister of Planning and Budget		Bruno Moretti	1 April 2026	Incumbent	
Minister of Health		Nísia Trindade	1 January 2023	25 February 2025	
Minister of Health		Alexandre Padilha	10 March 2025	Incumbent	Federal deputy on leave
Minister of Education		Camilo Santana	1 January 2023	2 April 2026	Senator on leave
Minister of Education		Leonardo Barchini	2 April 2026	Incumbent	
Secretary of Institutional Affairs		Alexandre Padilha	1 January 2023	10 March 2025	Federal deputy on leave
Secretary of Institutional Affairs		Gleisi Hoffmann	10 March 2025	3 April 2026	Federal deputy on leave
Secretary of Institutional Affairs		Marcelo Costa	3 April 2026	14 April 2026	Acting secretary
Secretary of Institutional Affairs		José Guimarães	14 April 2026	Incumbent	Federal deputy on leave
Secretary-General of the Presidency		Márcio Macêdo	1 January 2023	20 October 2025	
Secretary-General of the Presidency		Guilherme Boulos	20 October 2025	Incumbent	Federal deputy on leave
Secretary of Social Communication		Paulo Pimenta	1 January 2023	24 May 2024	Federal deputy on leave
Secretary of Social Communication		Laércio Portela	24 May 2024	10 September 2024	Acting secretary
Secretary of Social Communication		Paulo Pimenta	10 September 2024	7 January 2025	Federal deputy on leave
Secretary of Social Communication		Sidônio Palmeira	7 January 2025	Incumbent	
Secretary of Institutional Security		Gonçalves Dias	1 January 2023	19 April 2023	
Secretary of Institutional Security		Ricardo Cappelli	19 April 2023	4 May 2023	Acting secretary
Secretary of Institutional Security		Amaro dos Santos	4 May 2023	Incumbent	
Attorney General		Jorge Messias	1 January 2023	Incumbent	
Comptroller General		Vinícius Marques de Carvalho	1 January 2023	Incumbent	
Minister of Development, Industry, Trade and Services		Geraldo Alckmin	1 January 2023	3 April 2026	Vice President
Minister of Development, Industry, Trade and Services		Márcio Elias Rosa	3 April 2026	Incumbent	
Minister of Mines and Energy		Alexandre Silveira	1 January 2023	Incumbent	
Minister of Agriculture and Livestock		Carlos Fávaro	1 January 2023	31 March 2026	Senator on leave
Minister of Agriculture and Livestock		André de Paula	1 April 2026	Incumbent	
Minister of Social Development and Assistance, Family and Fight against Hunger		Wellington Dias	1 January 2023	Incumbent	Senator on leave
Minister of Labour and Employment		Luiz Marinho	1 January 2023	Incumbent	Federal deputy on leave
Minister of Social Security		Carlos Lupi	1 January 2023	2 May 2025	
Minister of Social Security		Wolney Queiroz	2 May 2025	Incumbent	
Minister of Cities		Jader Barbalho Filho	1 January 2023	2 April 2026	
Minister of Cities		Vladimir Lima	2 April 2026	Incumbent	
Minister of Transport		Renan Filho	1 January 2023	31 March 2026	Senator on leave
Minister of Transport		George Santoro	1 April 2026	Incumbent	
Minister of Integration and Regional Development		Waldez Góes	1 January 2023	Incumbent	
Minister of Environment and Climate Change		Marina Silva	1 January 2023	31 March 2026	Federal deputy on leave
Minister of Environment and Climate Change		João Paulo Capobianco	1 April 2026	Incumbent	
Minister of Science, Technology and Innovation		Luciana Santos	1 January 2023	Incumbent	
Minister of Management and Innovation in Public Services		Esther Dweck	1 January 2023	Incumbent	
Minister of Communications		Juscelino Filho	1 January 2023	8 April 2025	Federal deputy on leave
Minister of Communications		Frederico Siqueira	24 April 2025	Incumbent	
Minister of Agrarian Development and Family Farming		Paulo Teixeira	1 January 2023	31 March 2026	Federal deputy on leave
Minister of Agrarian Development and Family Farming		Fernanda Machiaveli	1 April 2026	Incumbent	
Minister of Ports and Airports		Márcio França	1 January 2023	13 September 2023	
Minister of Ports and Airports		Silvio Costa Filho	13 September 2023	31 March 2026	Federal deputy on leave
Minister of Ports and Airports		Tomé Franca	1 April 2026	Incumbent	
Minister of Human Rights and Citizenship		Silvio Almeida	1 January 2023	6 September 2024	
Minister of Human Rights and Citizenship		Esther Dweck	6 September 2024	9 September 2024	Acting minister
Minister of Human Rights and Citizenship		Macaé Evaristo	9 September 2024	31 March 2026	Minas Gerais state deputy on leave
Minister of Human Rights and Citizenship		Janine Mello	1 April 2026	Incumbent	
Minister of Women		Cida Gonçalves	1 January 2023	5 May 2025	
Minister of Women		Márcia Lopes	5 May 2025	Incumbent	
Minister of Racial Equality		Anielle Franco	1 January 2023	1 April 2026	
Minister of Racial Equality		Rachel Barros	1 April 2026	Incumbent	
Minister of Indigenous People		Sônia Guajajara	1 January 2023	31 March 2026	Federal deputy on leave
Minister of Indigenous People		Eloy Terena	1 April 2026	Incumbent	
Minister of Culture		Margareth Menezes	1 January 2023	Incumbent	
Minister of Tourism		Daniela Carneiro	1 January 2023	13 July 2023	
Minister of Tourism		Celso Sabino	3 August 2023	17 December 2025	Federal deputy on leave
Minister of Tourism		Gustavo Feliciano	23 December 2025	Incumbent	
Minister of Sports		Ana Moser	1 January 2023	13 September 2023	
Minister of Sports		André Fufuca	13 September 2023	31 March 2026	Federal deputy on leave
Minister of Sports		Paulo Henrique Perna Cordeiro	1 April 2026	Incumbent	
Minister of Entrepreneurship, Microenterprise and Small Business		Márcio França	13 September 2023	2 April 2026	
Minister of Entrepreneurship, Microenterprise and Small Business		Tadeu Alencar	3 April 2026	22 April 2026	
Minister of Entrepreneurship, Microenterprise and Small Business		Paulo Henrique Pereira	22 April 2026	Incumbent	
Minister of Fishing and Aquaculture		André de Paula	1 January 2023	31 March 2026	
Minister of Fishing and Aquaculture		Rivetla Edipo Araujo Cruz	1 April 2026	Incumbent	
Secretary of Support for Reconstruction of Rio Grande do Sul		Paulo Pimenta	24 May 2024	10 September 2024	Extraordinary secretariat
Non-cabinet positions
President of the Central Bank		Roberto Campos Neto	28 February 2019	31 December 2024	
President of the Central Bank		Gabriel Galípolo	1 January 2025	Incumbent	
CEO of Banco do Brasil		Tarciana Medeiros	16 January 2023	Incumbent	
CEO of Caixa Econômica Federal		Rita Serrano	12 January 2023	25 October 2023	
CEO of Caixa Econômica Federal		Carlos Vieira Fernandes	9 November 2023	Incumbent	
Chairman of the Brazilian Development Bank		Aloizio Mercadante	6 February 2023	Incumbent	
CEO of Petrobras		Jean Paul Prates	26 January 2023	14 May 2024	
CEO of Petrobras		Clarice Coppeti	14 May 2024	24 May 2024	Acting CEO
CEO of Petrobras		Magda Chambriard	24 May 2024	Incumbent	
Chief of the Joint General Staff of the Armed Forces		Renato de Aguiar Freire	6 January 2023	Incumbent	
Commander of the Brazilian Army		Júlio Cesar de Arruda	30 October 2022	21 January 2023	
Commander of the Brazilian Army		Tomás Ribeiro Paiva	25 January 2023	Incumbent	
Commander of the Brazilian Navy		Marcos Sampaio Olsen	5 January 2023	Incumbent	
Commander of the Brazilian Air Force		Marcelo Kanitz Damasceno	2 January 2023	Incumbent	

== See also ==
- First cabinet of Lula da Silva
