= Council of Government of Brazil =

Advisory body to the President of Brazil

Council of Government
- Conselho de Governo
- National Seal of Brazil

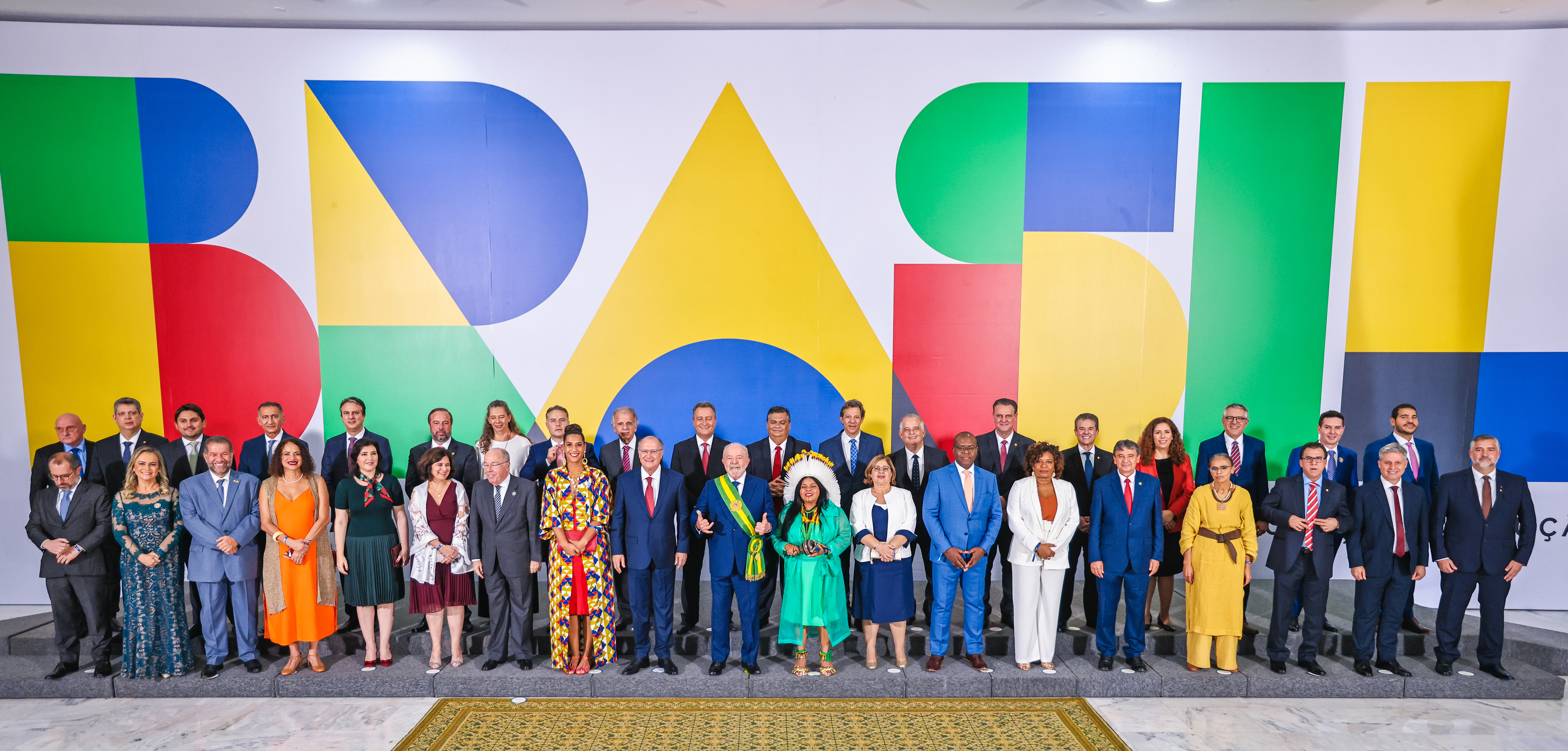
- President Lula da Silva's Cabinet pictured in January 2023
- Predecessor: Council of Ministers (1824-1889, 1961-1963)
- Formation: 15 March 1990; 36 years ago
- Legal status: Advisory body to the President of the Republic
- Headquarters: Palácio do Planalto
- Location: Brasília, Federal District
- Members: 40
- President: Luiz Inácio Lula da Silva, President of the Republic
- Executive Secretary: Francisca Lucileide de Carvalho, Executive Secretary of the Civilian House
- Parent organization: Presidency of the Republic
- Website: www.gov.br

The Council of Government (Portuguese: Conselho de Governo), formerly called Council of Ministers (Portuguese: Conselho de Ministros) and more rarely Cabinet (Portuguese: Gabinete), is an advisory body of the Federal Government of Brazil, responsible with advising the President of the Republic on the formulation of government action guidelines.

While not expressly provided for in the Constitution and holding no powers of its own, the Council is considered the principal body for governmental discussion and decision-making at the federal level. Currently, only the President and the Ministers of State are members, but the Vice President traditionally participates either in their own right or while heading one of the ministries.

The President of the Republic is ex officio the President of the Council of Government (Portuguese: Presidente do Conselho de Governo).

== Structure ==
Formally, the Council of Government is one of the advisory bodies under the Presidency of the Republic, among other institutions that also assist the Federal Government. There are currently twenty-three Ministries in the Federal Government, including six Ministry-level secretariats and offices attached to the Presidency: Casa Civil, General Secretariat, Secretariat of Institutional Relations, Secretariat of Social Communication, Institutional Security Bureau and the Office of the Attorney General of the Union (constitutionally autonomous). Although part of the structure of the Presidency, the Personal Office of the President of the Republic does not hold ministerial rank

The Constitution provides for two consultative bodies with specific constitutional competencies and members: the Council of the Republic and the National Defense Council. Although these are not part of the administrative structure of the Presidency of the Republic, they operate within it.

== History ==
=== Imperial Government ===
During the imperial era, the Cabinet or Council of Ministers was composed of its President and the Ministers of State appointed by the Emperor who relied on the confidence of the Chamber of Deputies and support from the Moderating Power. If the Chamber of Deputies passed a no-confidence vote against the Cabinet, it was up to the Emperor to dissolve the Council or the Chamber.

=== Republican Government ===
==== First to Fourth Republics ====
Under the Constitutions of 1891, 1934, 1937, and 1946, executive power was vested in President of the Republic. In all of them, the Ministers of State were expressly mentioned as direct aides to the Head of the Federal Executive Branch, but there was no mention of a specific body such as the former Council of Ministers.

There were three occasions when the Federal Executive Branch was not formally vested in the President of the Republic:

1. From the Proclamation of the Republic until the coming into force of the 1891 Constitution, a period during which a Provisional Government led by Generalíssimo Deodoro da Fonseca was the supreme authority in the country.
2. In the aftermath of the Revolution of 1930, a Provisional Governing Junta deposed President Washington Luís, claiming to be the sole power in the country; it was quickly succeeded by a Provisional Government led by Getúlio Vargas until the coming into force of the 1934 Constitution.
3. In 1969, between the sudden illness of President Artur da Costa e Silva and the swearing-in of Emílio Garrastazu Médici as his successor. In this case, the Military Ministers assumed the powers of the President of the Republic by preventing Vice President Pedro Aleixo from becoming Acting President, in violation of the 1967 Constitution.

==== Late Fourth Republic ====
During the brief parliamentary system under the late Fourth Republic, the Additional Act to the 1946 Constitution re-established the Council of Ministers as a specific constitutional body, leading the Federal Executive Branch alongside the President of the Republic.

The Council of Ministers was collectively accountable to the Chamber of Deputies for Federal Government policy and the overall direction of public administration. The Council of Ministers and its President was to be nominated by the President of the Republic and approved by an absolute majority of the Deputies; the Federal Senate played no part in the normal process but could raise objections.

If three nominations for the Council of Ministers were rejected by the Chamber of Deputies, it would fall to the Federal Senate to approve the appointment. In the event of a lack of parliamentary support after approval, demonstrated by motions of no confidence passed consecutively against three successive Councils, the President of the Republic could dissolve the Chamber of Deputies and call for new elections.

In the following year, a complementary law organized the operation of the Government and regulated the relationship between the President of the Republic, the Council of Ministers, and the National Congress, establishing procedures for the formation and operation of the cabinet, parliamentary oversight, and the exercise of executive authority. However, due to the short life of the parliamentary system, most of the related constitutional mechanisms were never applied.

==== Restoration of Presidentialism ====
The Council of Ministers, as a specific constitutional body, ceased to exist after the presidential system of government was restored following the 1963 referendum. The subsequent 1967 and 1988 Constitutions retained presidentialism as the system of government. In 1990, a provisional measure established the Council of Government in its current form, and it was retained by subsequent presidencies.

== Responsibilities ==
17th Meeting of the Council of Government (30 September 2019)

The Ministers of State assist the President of the Republic in overall direction of public administration. Each minister is responsible for the general administration of a government portfolio, and heads the corresponding ministry or office. The Ministries prepare decrees, monitor and evaluate federal programs, and formulate and implement policies for the sectors they represent. They are also responsible for establishing strategies, policies and priorities in the application of public resources. Generally, the Minister of State considered to be the highest-ranking is the Chief of Staff (Portuguese: Chefe da Casa Civil, lit. 'Head of the Civilian House'), while other high-profile ministers include Finance, Justice, External Relations and Defense.

== Current cabinet ==
As of 5 May 2026:

Order	Symbol	Office	Portrait	Incumbent	Party	Taking office
1		President of the Republic		Luiz Inácio Lula da Silva	PT	1 January 2023
2		Vice President of the Republic		Geraldo Alckmin	PSB	1 January 2023
3		Minister of State of the Civilian House of the Presidency of the Republic		Miriam Belchior	PT	2 April 2026
4		Minister of State of the General Secretariat of the Presidency of the Republic		Guilherme Castro Boulos	PSOL	20 October 2025
5		Minister of State of the Secretariat of Institutional Affairs of the Presidency of the Republic		José Nobre Guimarães	PT	14 April 2026
6		Minister of State of the Secretariat of Social Communication of the Presidency of the Republic		Sidônio Palmeira	PT	14 January 2026
7		Minister of State Head of the Institutional Security Bureau of the Presidency of the Republic		Marcos Antonio Amaro dos Santos	Independent	4 May 2023
8		Attorney General of the Union		Jorge Rodrigo Araújo Messias	Independent	1 January 2023
9		Minister of State of the Comptroller General of the Union		Vinícius Marques de Carvalho	Independent	1 January 2023
10		Minister of State of Agriculture and Livestock		André Carlos Alves de Paula Filho	PSD	1 January 2023
11		Minister of State of Cities		Antonio Vladimir Moura Lima	Independent	2 April 2026
12		Minister of State of Science, Technology and Innovation		Luciana Barbosa de Oliveira Santos	PCdoB	1 January 2023
13		Minister of State of Communications		Frederico de Siqueira Filho	Independent	24 April 2025
14		Minister of State of Culture		Margareth Menezes da Purificação Costa	Independent	1 January 2023
15		Minister of State of Defense		José Mucio Monteiro Filho	Independent	1 January 2023
16		Minister of State of Agrarian Development and Family Farming		Fernanda Machiaveli Morão de Oliveira	Independent	31 March 2026
17		Minister of State of Social Development and Assistance, Family and the Fight against Hunger		José Wellington Barroso de Araujo Dias	PT	1 January 2023
18		Minister of State of Development, Industry, Trade and Services		Márcio Fernando Elias Rosa	Independent	3 April 2026
19		Minister of State of Human Rights and Citizenship		Janine Mello dos Santos	Independent	1 April 2026
20		Minister of State of Education		Leonardo Osvaldo Barchini Rosa	Independent	2 April 2026
21		Minister of State of Entrepreneurship, Microenterprise and Small Business		Francisco Tadeu Barbosa de Alencar	PSB	3 April 2026
22		Minister of State of Sports		Paulo Henrique Perna Cordeiro	PP	1 April 2026
23		Minister of State of Finance		Dario Carnevalli Durigan	Independent	19 March 2026
24		Minister of State of Management and Innovation in Public Services		Esther Dweck	PT	1 January 2023
25		Minister of State of Racial Equality		Rachel Barros de Oliveira	Independent	1 April 2026
26		Minister of State of Justice and Public Security		Wellington César Lima e Silva	Independent	15 January 2026
27		Minister of State of Integration and Regional Development		Antônio Waldez Góes da Silva	PDT	1 January 2023
28		Minister of State of the Environment and Climate Change		João Paulo Ribeiro Capobianco	Independent	1 April 2026
29		Minister of State of Mines and Energy		Alexandre Silveira de Oliveira	PSD	1 January 2023
30		Minister of State of Women		Márcia Helena Carvalho Lopes	PT	5 May 2025
31		Minister of State of Fisheries and Aquaculture		Rivetla Edipo Araujo Cruz	Independent	1 April 2026
32		Minister of State of Planning and Budget		Bruno Moretti	Independent	1 April 2026
33		Minister of State of Indigenous Peoples		Luiz Henrique Eloy Amado	PSOL	31 March 2026
34		Minister of State of Ports and Airports		Tomé Monteiro da Franca	Independent	1 April 2026
35		Minister of State of Social Security		Wolney Queiroz Maciel	PDT	2 May 2025
36		Minister of State of External Relations		Mauro Luiz Iecker Vieira	Independent	1 January 2023
37		Minister of State of Health		Alexandre Rocha Santos Padilha	PT	10 March 2026
38		Minister of State of Labor and Employment		Luiz Marinho	PT	1 January 2023
39		Minister of State of Transport		George Santoro	Independent	1 April 2026
40		Minister of State of Tourism		Gustavo Costa Feliciano	Independent	23 December 2025

== List of recent cabinets ==
- Cabinet of Fernando Henrique Cardoso
- First cabinet of Luiz Inácio Lula da Silva
- Cabinet of Dilma Rousseff
- Cabinet of Michel Temer
- Cabinet of Jair Bolsonaro
- Second cabinet of Lula da Silva

== See also ==
- Federal institutions of Brazil
