= Guilherme Mello =

Brazilian economist (born 1983)

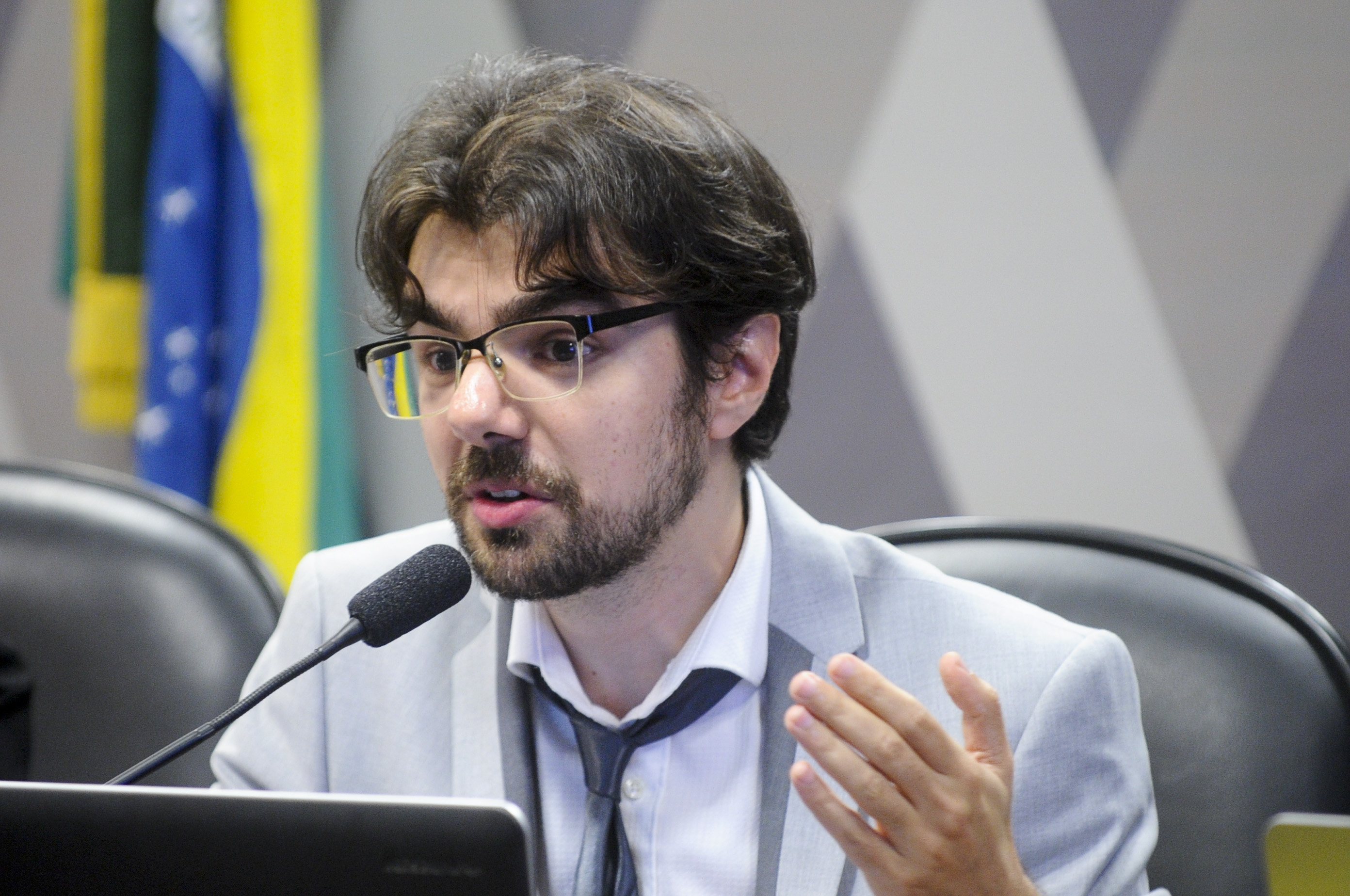
- Mello in 2016

Executive-Secretary of the Ministry of Planning and Budget
- Incumbent
- Assumed office 9 April 2026
- Minister: Bruno Moretti
- Preceded by: Bruno Moretti

Secretary of Economic Policy of the Ministry of Finance
- In office 1 January 2023 – 9 April 2026
- Minister: Fernando Haddad; Dario Durigan
- Preceded by: Pedro Calhman de Miranda
- Succeeded by: Débora Freire

Personal details
- Born: Guilherme Santos Mello; 9 June 1983 (age 43)
- Party: PT
- Education: State University of Campinas (BEc, MSSc, PhD)
- Profession: Economist

Guilherme Santos Mello (born 9 June 1983) is a Brazilian economist, sociologist, and professor, who has served as Executive-Secretary of the Ministry of Planning and Budget since 2026. He also served as Secretary of Economic Policy at Brazil's Ministry of Finance from 2023 to 2026 under Minister Fernando Haddad. He is on leave from his position as a professor at the Institute of Economics (IE) of the State University of Campinas (Unicamp).
