= João Paulo Costa =

Brazilian politician (born 1991)

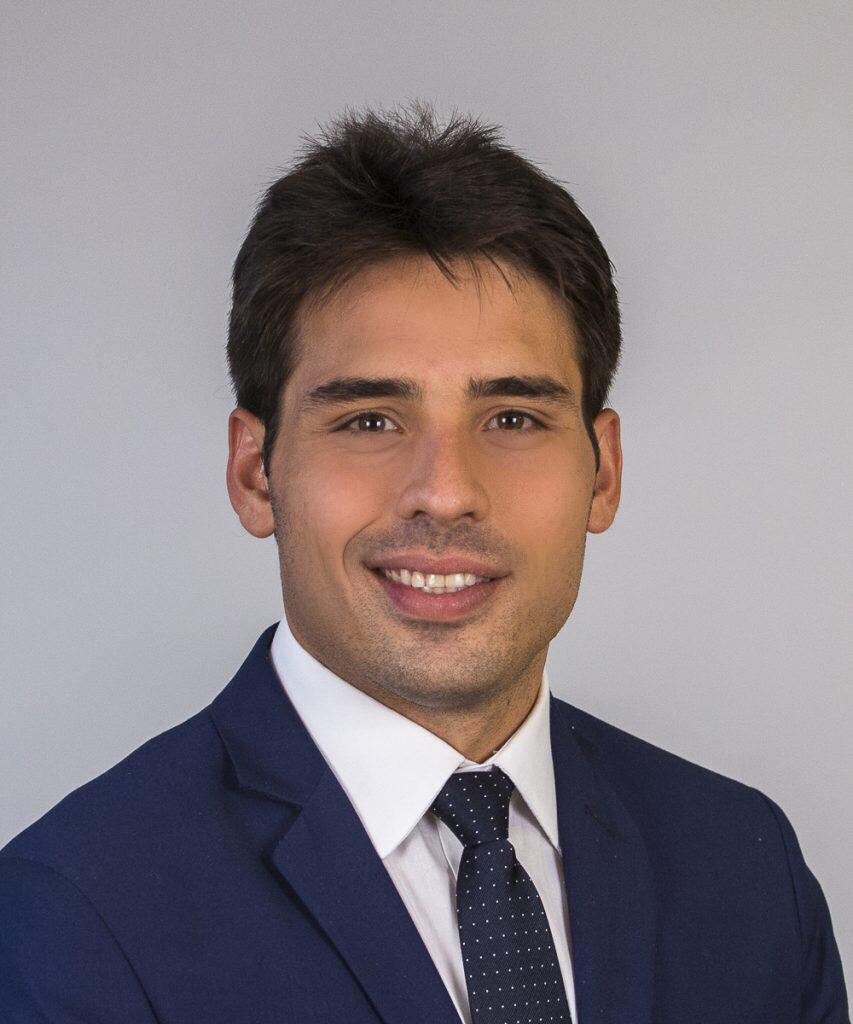
- Costa in 2019

Member of the Legislative Assembly of Pernambuco
- Incumbent
- Assumed office 1 February 2019

Personal details
- Born: 27 March 1991 (age 35)
- Party: Communist Party of Brazil (since 2022)
- Parent: Silvio Costa (father)
- Relatives: Silvio Costa Filho (brother)

João Paulo Costa Cavalcanti (born 27 March 1991) is a Brazilian politician serving as a member of the Legislative Assembly of Pernambuco since 2019. He is the son of Silvio Costa and the brother of Silvio Costa Filho.
