= Ministry of Management and Innovation in Public Services =

Management ministry body of Brazil

- Portuguese: Ministério da Gestão e Inovação em Serviços Públicos
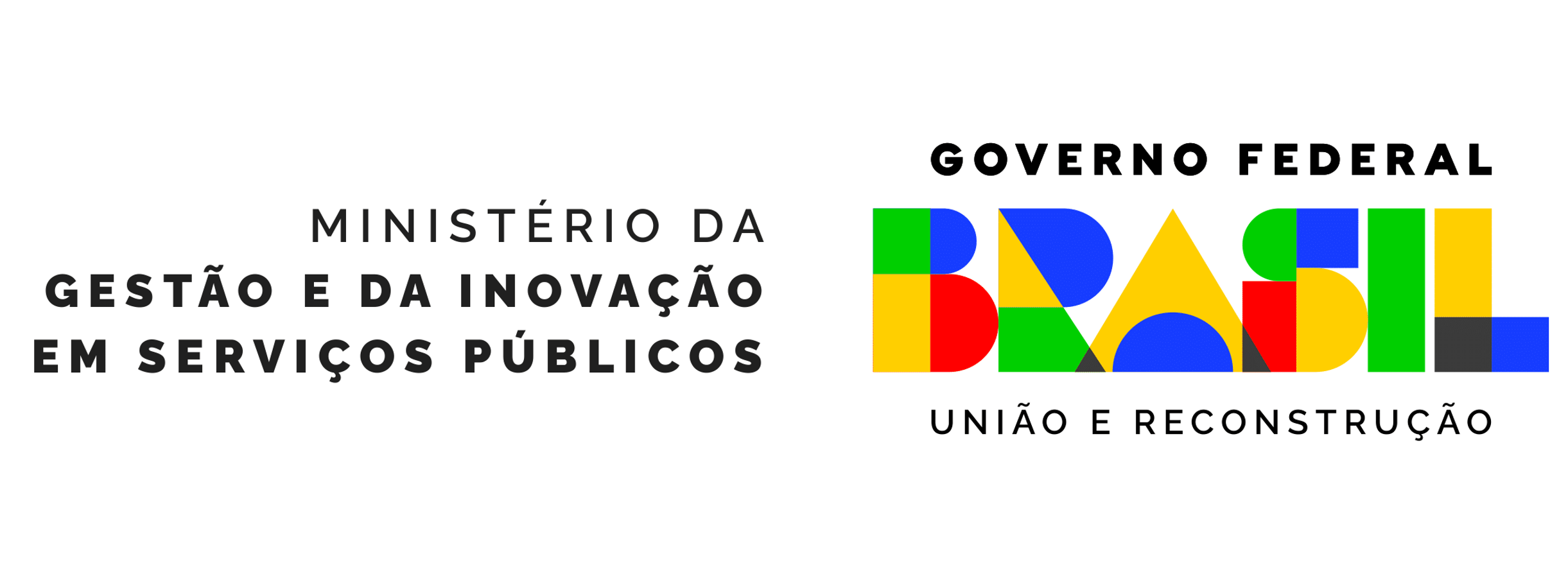

Agency overview
- Formed: 1 January 2023; 2 years ago
- Type: Ministry
- Jurisdiction: Federal government of Brazil
- Headquarters: Esplanada dos Ministérios, Bloco K Brasília, Federal District
- Annual budget: $7.49 b BRL (2023)
- Agency executives: Esther Dweck, Minister; Francisco Gaetani, Secretary for Transformation of the State; Roberto Pojo, Secretary of Management and Innovation; Rogerio Mascarenhas, Secretary of Digital Government; José Celso Cardoso Jr., Secretary of People's Management; Jose Lopez Feijóo, Secretary of Labour Affairs; Lucio Geraldo de Andrade, Secretary of the Union's Assets; Elisa Vieira Leonel, Secretary of Coordination and Governance of State Companies; Cilair Rodrigues de Abreu, Secretary of Shared Services
- Website: www.gov.br/gestao/pt-br/

The Ministry of Management and Innovation in Public Services (Portuguese: Ministério da Gestão e Inovação em Serviços Públicos) is a cabinet-level federal ministry in Brazil, established in 2023. It is responsible for reforms of the public administration and promotion of government efficiency, including government digitalization and debureaucratization.

The ministry was established from the old Ministry of Economy, created during president Jair Bolsonaro administration, receiving the new designation and current attributions with the return of Luiz Inácio Lula da Silva to the presidency in 2023.

During Lula's first and second terms, the scope of public service management was included in the Ministry of Planning, Budget and Management (MPOG). However, when dissolving the Ministry of Economy in 2022, the new administration decided to split the old MPOG in two ministries: the MGI and the Ministry of Planning and Budget (MPO). The ministry structure was established by Presidential Decree 11345.

The first ministry holder was economist Esther Dweck, former secretary of Federal Budget during president Dilma Rousseff administration.

== History ==
The Ministry of Management and Innovation in Public Services remembers the old Ministry of Administration, dissolved in 1999.

The first agency responsible for federal administration and State reform with a cabinet-level status was the Secretariat of Federal Administration, established on 19 November 1992 during the presidency of Itamar Franco. On 27 May 1998, during the presidency of Fernando Henrique Cardoso, the Ministry of Administration and State Reform (MARE) was established, but dissolved six months later. On 1 January 1999, its attributions were merged into the Ministry of Budget and Management, replaced on 30 July 1999 by the Ministry of Planning, Budget and Management. This structure remained until 12 May 2016, when president Michel Temer renamed it to Ministry of Planning, Development and Management. On 1 January 2019, president Bolsonaro merged the ministry attribution into the Ministry of Economy.

On 1 January 2023, with the new Lula administration, the Ministry of Planning and Budget was reestablished and the management structure was transferred to the Ministry of Management.

== Areas of expertise ==
These are the ministry attributions, according to Provisional Measure 1154:

1. guidelines, standards and procedures aimed to efficient, accurate, effective and innovative public management for creation of public value and reduction of inequalities;
2. people management policy and development of transversal and leadership skills for federal public administration staff;
3. innovation in public services, simplification and increased efficiency and effectiveness of public policies;
4. digital transformation of public services, governance and data sharing;
5. coordination and management of the structuring systems of institutional organization and innovation, general services, civil personnel, administration of information technology resources, partnership management and document and archive management;
6. supervision and execution of administrative activities of the Ministry and other bodies and entities of the federal public administration;
7. guidelines, standards and procedures for the administration of the Union's real estate assets;
8. guidelines, coordination and definition of corporate governance criteria for federal state-owned companies;
9. national archives policy;
10. policies and guidelines for the permanent transformation of the State and expansion of state capacity;
11. federative cooperation on matters within the Ministry’s jurisdiction.

In addition to the skills above, the Minister of Management and Innovation will always have a member appointed to the boards of directors of public companies, mixed-economy companies, their subsidiaries and controlled companies and other companies in which the Union, directly or indirectly, holds the majority of the share capital with voting rights.

== Structure ==
The following secretariats are part of the ministry, according to Presidential Decree 12102:

As specific agencies:

- Extraordinary Secretariat for Transformation of State;
- Secretariat of Management and Innovation;
- Secretariat of People Management
- Secretariat of Labour Affairs;
- Secretariat of Digital Government;
- Secretariat of the Union's Patrimony;
- Secretariat of Coordination and Governance of State Companies;
- Secretariat of Shared Services;
- Brazilian National Archives.

As a collegiate agency:

- National Archives Council

As child agencies:

- Empresa de Tecnologia e Informações da Previdência (Dataprev)
- Fundação Escola Nacional de Administração Pública (Enap)
- Fundação de Previdência Complementar do Servidor Público Federal do Poder Executivo (Funpresp-Exe)

== List of ministers ==
No.	Portrait	Minister	Took office	Left office	Time in office	Party	President
1	Esther Dweck	Esther Dweck (born 1977)	1 January 2023	Incumbent	2 years, 83 days	Independent	Luiz Inácio Lula da Silva (PT)
