= Silvio Costa Filho =

Brazilian politician (born 1982)

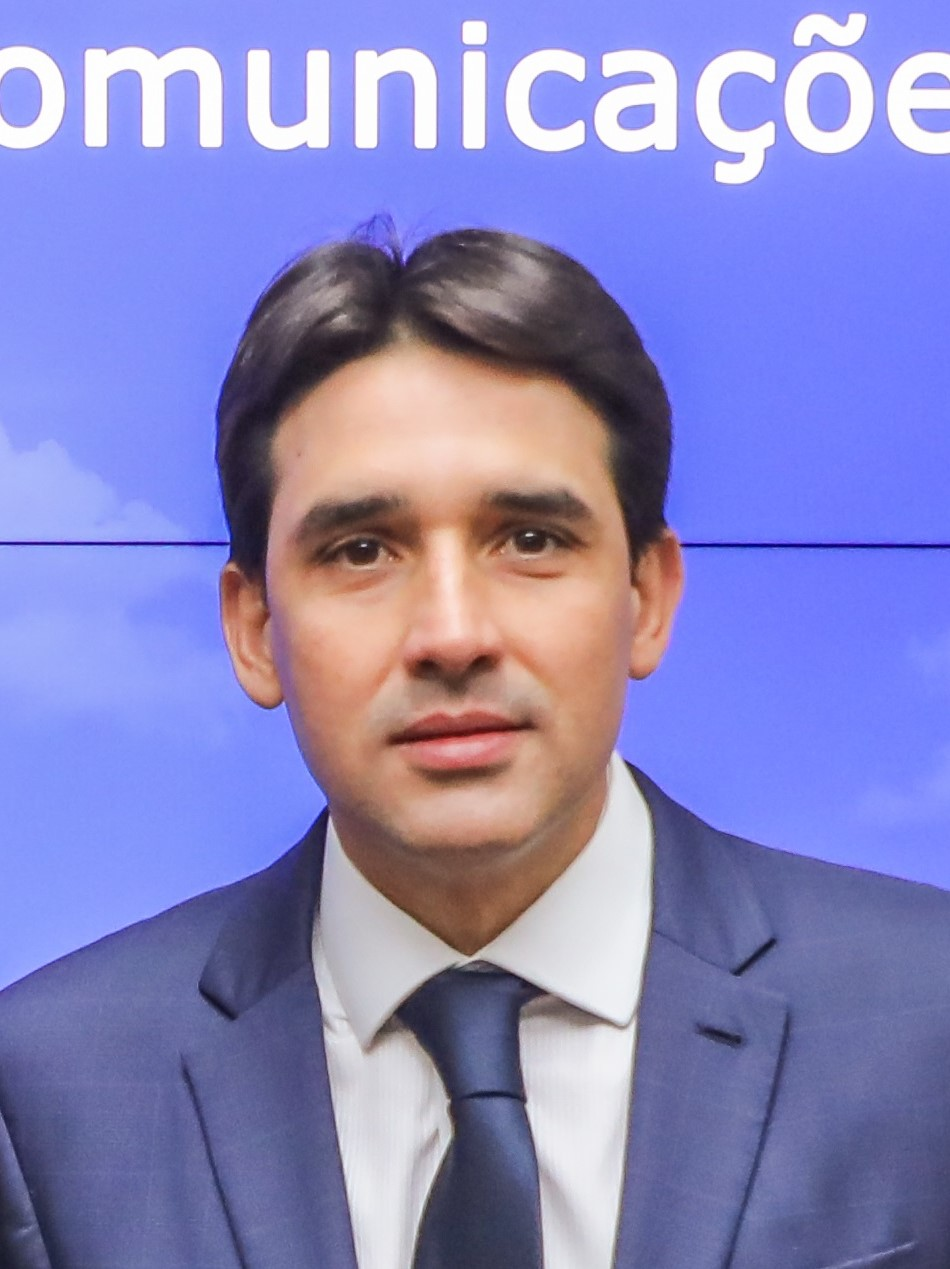
- Costa Filho in 2023

Minister of Ports and Airports
- In office 13 September 2023 – 30 March 2026
- President: Luiz Inácio Lula da Silva
- Preceded by: Márcio França
- Succeeded by: Tomé Franca

Personal details
- Born: 5 March 1982 (age 44)
- Party: Republicans (since 2016)
- Parent: Silvio Costa (father)
- Relatives: João Paulo Costa (brother)

Silvio Serafim Costa Filho (born 5 March 1982) is a Brazilian politician serving as minister of ports and airports since 2023. He has been a member of the Chamber of Deputies since 2019.
