= Ministry of Entrepreneurship, Microenterprise and Small Business =

Federal ministry in Brazil

- Portuguese: Ministério do Empreendedorismo, da Microempresa e da Empresa de Pequeno Porte

Agency overview
- Formed: 1 April 2013
- Type: Ministry
- Jurisdiction: Federal government of Brazil
- Headquarters: Esplanada dos Ministérios; Brasília, Federal District
- Agency executive: Márcio França, Minister
- Website: www.gov.br/memp

The Ministry of Entrepreneurship, Microenterprise and Small Business (Portuguese: Ministério do Empreendedorismo, da Microempresa e da Empresa de Pequeno Porte) is a cabinet-level federal ministry in Brazil. It is an institution previously created in 2013 as the Secretariat for Micro and Small Enterprises (Portuguese: Secretaria da Micro e Pequena Empresa da Presidência da República), a cabinet-level secretariat under the responsibility of the Presidency of the Republic from 2013 to 2015. It was dissolved after a ministry shuffle in October 2015. Since then, it became part of the Secretariat of Government of the Presidency, without a ministry status. On 1 January 2019, its functions were merged into the recently created Ministry of the Economy. On 13 September 2023, it was recreated as a ministry.

== Ministers ==
No.	Portrait	Minister	Took office	Left office	Time in office	Party	President
1	Guilherme Afif Domingos	Guilherme Afif Domingos (born 1943)	1 April 2013	2 October 2015	2 years, 184 days	PSD	Dilma Rousseff (PT)
2	Carlos Leony	Carlos Leony	2 October 2015	17 May 2016	228 days	Independent	Dilma Rousseff (PT)
3	José Martins da Veiga	José Martins da Veiga	17 May 2016	1 January 2019	2 years, 229 days	Independent	Michel Temer (MDB)
4	Márcio França	Márcio França (born 1963)	13 September 2023	Incumbent	1 year, 195 days	PSB	Luiz Inácio Lula da Silva (PT)
