= Esther Dweck =

Brazilian economist and researcher

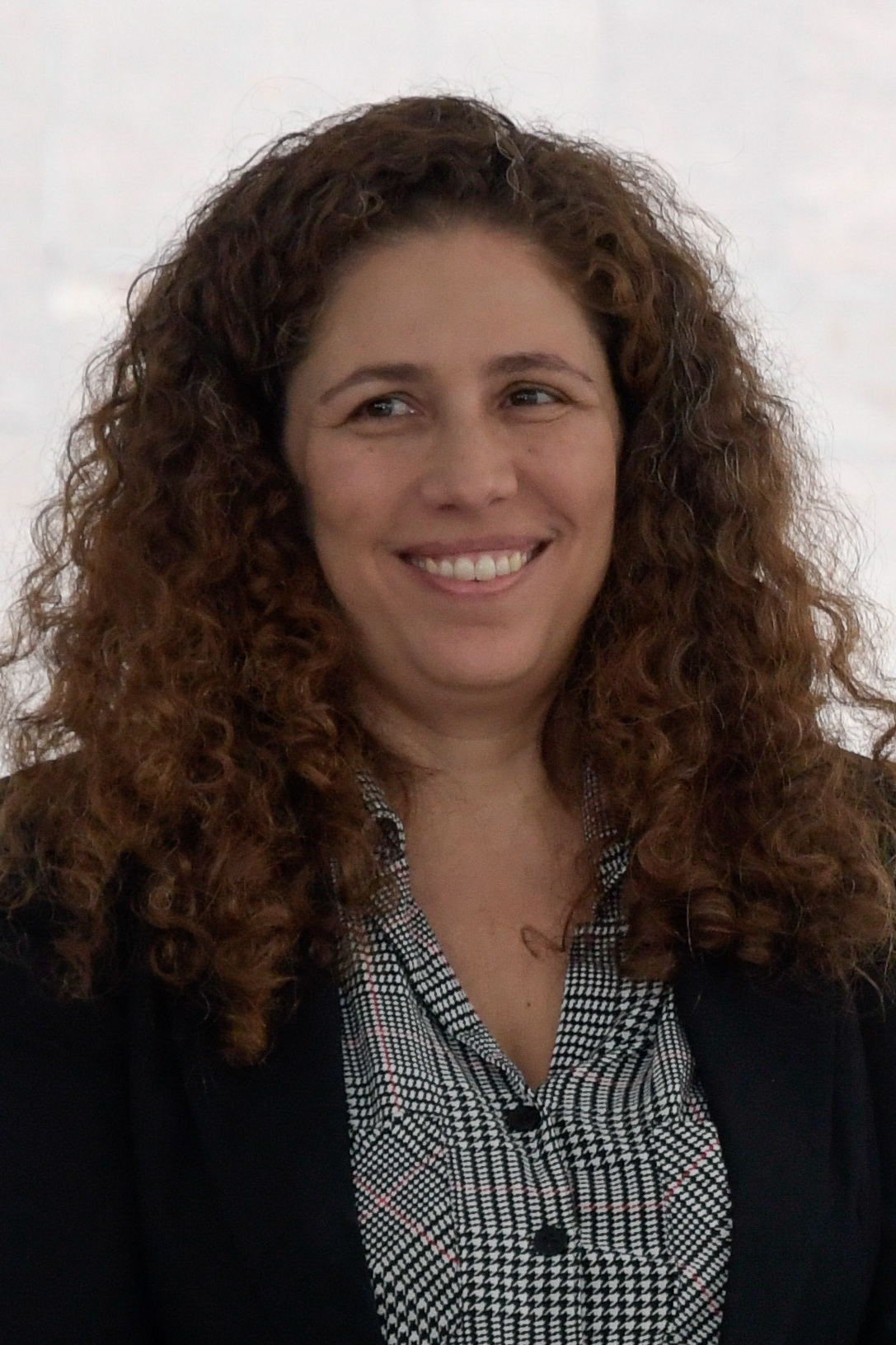
- Dweck in 2023

Minister of Management and Innovation in Public Services of Brazil
- Incumbent
- Assumed office 1 January 2023
- President: Luiz Inácio Lula da Silva
- Preceded by: Paulo Guedes (Note: Guedes served as Minister of the Economy which was divided into the Ministry of Finance under Fernando Haddad, the Ministry of Planning and Budget under Simone Tebet, and the Ministry of Management and Innovation in Public Services, under the Second cabinet of Lula da Silva.)

Acting Minister of Humans Rights and Citizenship of Brazil
- In office 6 September 2024 – 9 September 2024
- President: Luiz Inácio Lula da Silva
- Preceded by: Silvio Almeida
- Succeeded by: Macaé Evaristo

Secretary of Federal Budget of Brazil
- In office 16 January 2015 – 4 March 2016
- President: Dilma Rousseff
- Minister: Nelson Barbosa; Valdir Moysés Simão
- Preceded by: José Roberto de Moraes
- Succeeded by: Francisco de Assis Leme

Personal details
- Born: 23 May 1977 (age 49)
- Education: Federal University of Rio de Janeiro (BSocSc)
- Profession: Economist, professor

Esther Dweck (born 23 May 1977) is a Brazilian economist, professor and writer. As of 2022, she is a professor at the Institute of Economics of the Federal University of Rio de Janeiro. In December 2022, she was nominated the Minister of Management and Innovation in Public Services by the president Luiz Inácio Lula da Silva.

== See also ==
- Maria da Conceição Tavares
- Second presidency of Lula da Silva

== Notes ==
Political offices
Preceded by José Roberto de Moraes	Secretary of Federal Budget; 2015–2016	Succeeded by Francisco de Assis Leme
Office established	Minister of Management and Innovation in Public Services; 2023–present	Incumbent
