= Ministry of Ports and Airports (Brazil) =

- Portuguese: Ministério dos Portos e Aeroportos
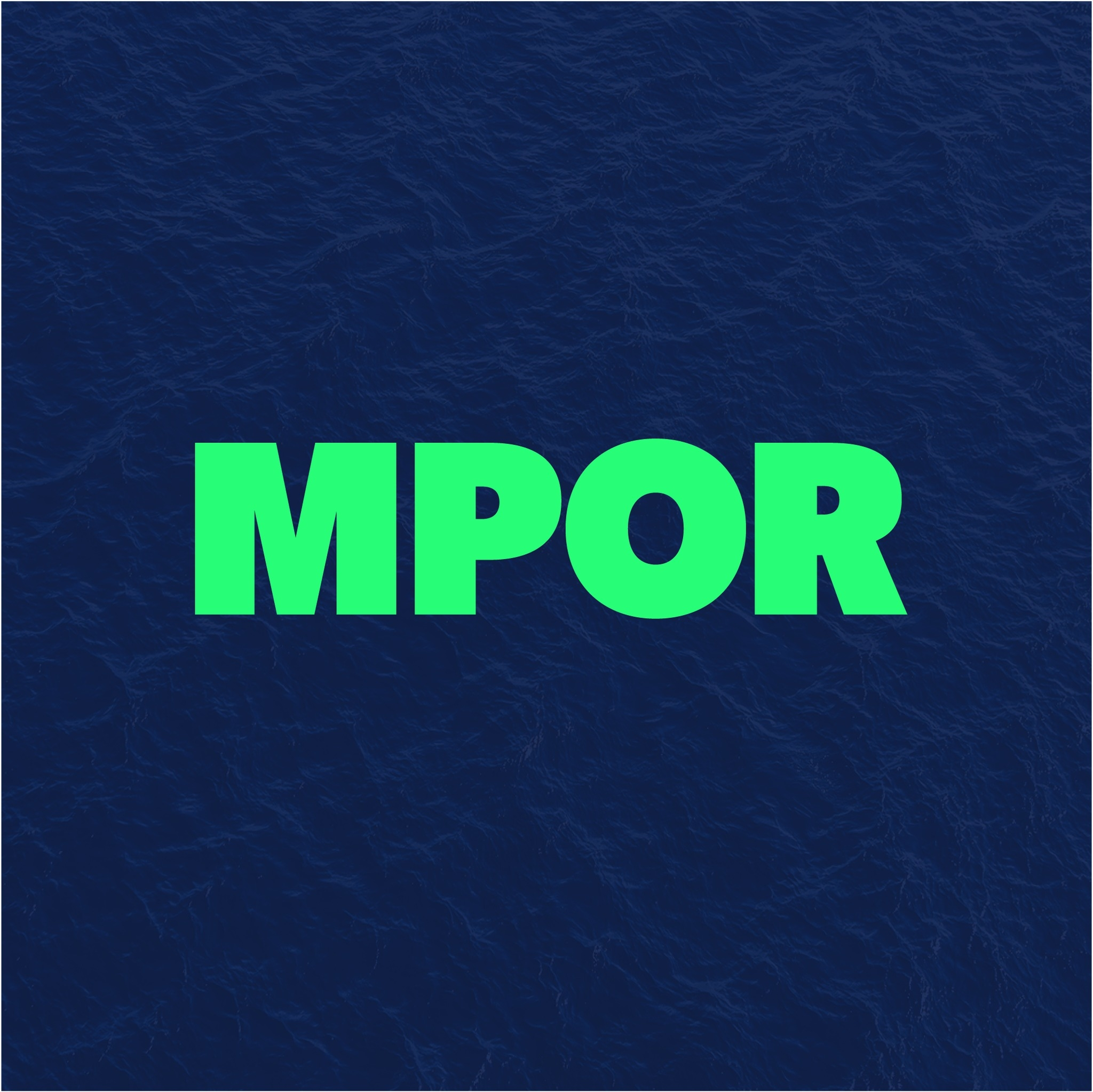

Agency overview
- Formed: 15 May 2007; 19 years ago
- Type: Ministry
- Jurisdiction: Federal government of Brazil
- Headquarters: Esplanada dos Ministérios Brasília, Federal District
- Annual budget: $3.98 b BRL (2023)
- Agency executives: Tomé Franca, Minister; Thairyne Martins, Executive-Secretary; Alex Sandro de Ávila, Secretary of Ports; Daniel Ramos Longo, Secretary of Civil Aviation; Otto Burlier Filho, Secretary of Waterways and Navigation
- Website: www.gov.br/portos-e-aeroportos/

The Ministry of Ports and Airports (Portuguese: Ministério dos Portos e Aeroportos, MPOR) is a cabinet-level federal ministry in Brazil.

== Secretariat ==
The National Secretariat of Ports and Water Transportation (Portuguese: Secretaria Nacional de Portos e Transportes Aquaviários, SNPTA) was an institution part of the Ministry of Infrastructure and was responsible for the creation of politics and guidelines for the promotion of the seaport sector, besides the execution of the measures, programs and support projects for development of port infrastructure. It was also responsible for the administration of Companhias Docas. The Secretariat also had a part in the strategic planning and approval of grant plans, aiming to ensure safety and efficiency in water transportation of cargo and passengers in the country. The Secretariat was once part of the Ministry of Transport, Ports and Civil Aviation.

In 2010, around 700 million tons of goods were handler per year in Brazilian ports and it was part of approximately 90% of foreign trade of the country. The creation of the Secretariat intends to improve the port terminals of the country at the same level of competitivity of the most efficient ports of the world.

== History ==
The previous institution that managed the Brazilian ports was Empresa de Portos do Brasil S.A. (Portobrás), created by Law 6222/1975 and extinct by Law 8630/1993.

In 2007, the Secretariat of Ports of the Presidency of the Republic (SEP/PR) was created by Provisory Measure 369/2007, which was converted into Law 11518/2017.

In 2010, Law 12314 converts the Special Secretariat of ports into Secretariat of Ports, both as a cabinet-level position.

In 2016, Law 13341 dissolves the Secretariat of Ports of the Presidency of the Republic, merging its attributions to the Ministry of Transports, renamed to Ministry of Transports, Port and Civil Aviation.

== List of ministers ==
No.	Portrait	Minister	Took office	Left office	Time in office	Party	President
1	Pedro Brito	Pedro Brito (born 1950)	15 May 2007	1 January 2011	3 years, 231 days	PSB	Luiz Inácio Lula da Silva (PT)
2	Leônidas Cristino	Leônidas Cristino (born 1957)	1 January 2011	3 October 2013	2 years, 275 days	PSB	Dilma Rousseff (PT)
3	Antonio Henrique Pinheiro Silveira	Antonio Henrique Pinheiro Silveira (born 1964)	3 October 2013	26 June 2014	266 days	Independent	Dilma Rousseff (PT)
4	César Borges	César Borges (born 1948)	26 June 2014	1 January 2015	189 days	PR	Dilma Rousseff (PT)
5	Edson Coelho Araújo	Edson Coelho Araújo (born 1949)	1 January 2015	2 October 2015	274 days	MDB	Dilma Rousseff (PT)
6	Helder Barbalho	Helder Barbalho (born 1979)	2 October 2015	20 April 2016	201 days	MDB	Dilma Rousseff (PT)
7	Maurício Muniz Barreto de Carvalho	Maurício Muniz Barreto de Carvalho (born 1958)	22 April 2016	12 May 2016	20 days	Independent	Dilma Rousseff (PT)
8	Márcio França	Márcio França (born 1963)	1 January 2023	13 September 2023	255 days	PSB	Luiz Inácio Lula da Silva (PT)
9	Sílvio Costa Filho	Sílvio Costa Filho (born 1982)	13 September 2023	31 March 2026	2 years, 199 days	Republicanos	Luiz Inácio Lula da Silva (PT)
10	Tomé Franca	Tomé Franca	31 March 2026	Incumbent	132 days	Independent	Luiz Inácio Lula da Silva (PT)
