= List of ministers of planning of Brazil =

Minister of State for Planning and Budget of the Federative Republic of Brazil
- Ministra de Estado do Planejamento e Orçamento da República Federativa do Brasil
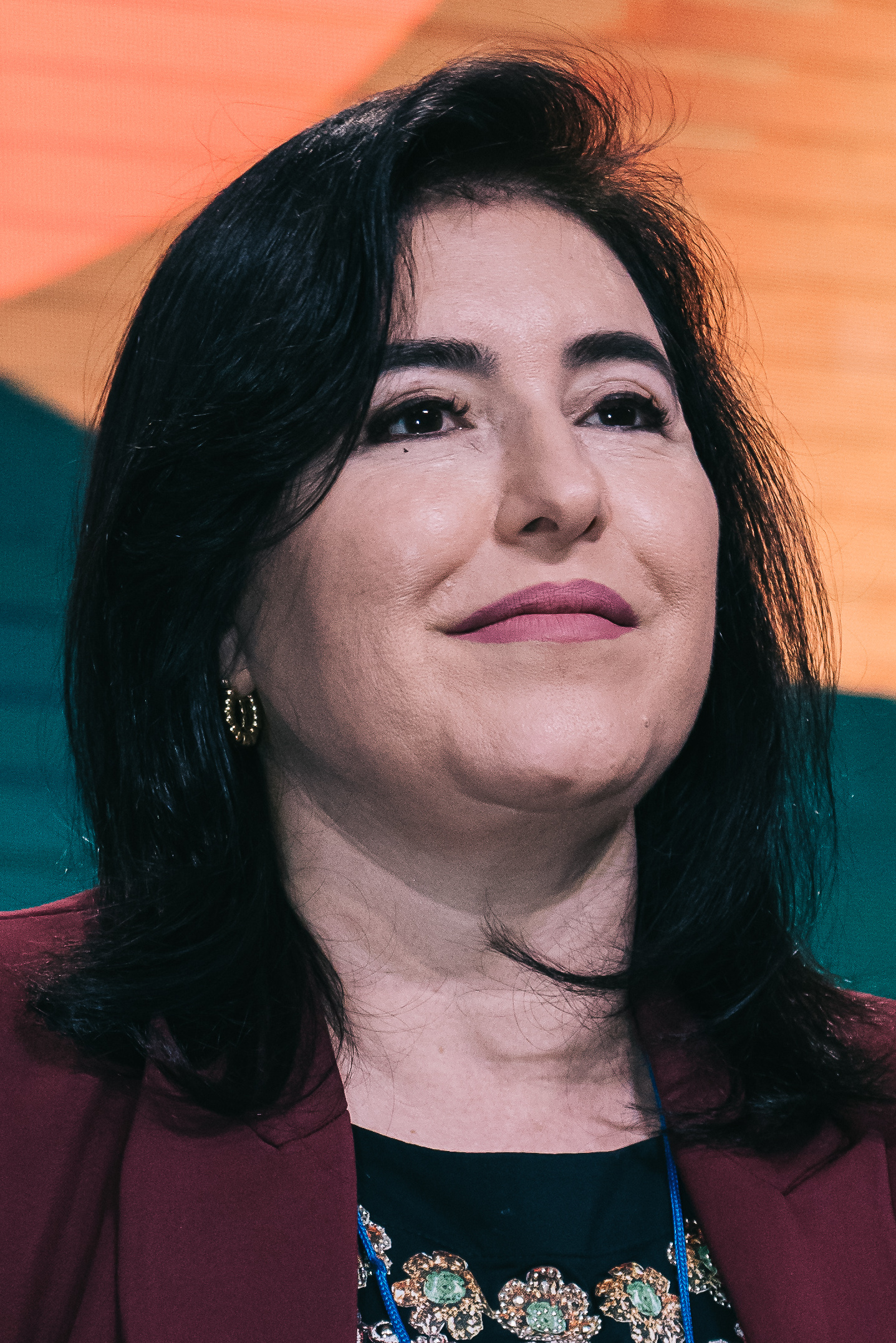
- Incumbent; Simone Tebet since 1 January 2023
- Style: Madam Minister (informal); The Most Excellent Minister (formal); Her Excellency (diplomatic)
- Type: Ministry
- Abbreviation: MPO
- Member of: the Cabinet; National Defense Council
- Reports to: the President
- Seat: Brasília, Federal District
- Appointer: President of Brazil
- Constituting instrument: Constitution of Brazil
- Formation: 25 January 1962; 64 years ago
- First holder: Celso Furtado
- Salary: R$ 39,293.32 monthly
- Website: www.gov.br/planejamento/

This is a comprehensive list of ministers of planning, listing all holders of the office of Minister of Planning of Brazil. Due to frequent changes in the name of the Ministry, most Ministers of State served under different titles.

== Fourth Brazilian Republic ==
No.	Portrait	Minister	Took office	Left office	Time in office	Party	President
1	Celso Furtado	Celso Furtado (1920–2004)	25 September 1962	31 March 1964	1 year, 188 days	Independent	João Goulart (PTB)

== Military Dictatorship (Fifth Brazilian Republic) ==
No.	Portrait	Minister	Took office	Left office	Time in office	Party	President
2	Roberto Campos	Roberto Campos (1917–2001)	15 April 1964	15 March 1967	2 years, 334 days	Independent	Castelo Branco (ARENA)
3	Hélio Beltrão	Hélio Beltrão (1916–1997)	15 March 1967	30 October 1969	2 years, 229 days	Independent	Costa e Silva (ARENA); Military Junta
4	Reis Veloso	Reis Veloso (1931–2019)	31 October 1969	15 March 1979	9 years, 135 days	Independent	Emílio Médici (ARENA); Ernesto Geisel (ARENA)
5	Mário Henrique Simonsen	Mário Henrique Simonsen (1935–1997)	15 March 1979	10 August 1979	148 days	Independent	João Figueiredo (ARENA)
6	Golbery do Couto e Silva	Golbery do Couto e Silva (1911–1987)	10 August 1979	15 August 1979	5 days	Independent	João Figueiredo (ARENA)
7	Antônio Delfim Netto	Antônio Delfim Netto (1928–2024)	15 August 1979	15 March 1985	5 years, 212 days	PDS	João Figueiredo (PDS)

== Sixth Brazilian Republic ==
No.	Portrait	Minister	Took office	Left office	Time in office	Party	President
8	João Sayad	João Sayad (1945–2021)	15 March 1985	23 March 1987	2 years, 8 days	Independent	José Sarney (MDB)
9	Aníbal Teixeira de Souza	Aníbal Teixeira de Souza (1933–2015)	23 March 1987	21 January 1988	304 days	MDB	José Sarney (MDB)
10	João Batista de Abreu	João Batista de Abreu (born 1943)	21 January 1988	15 March 1990	2 years, 53 days	Independent	José Sarney (MDB)
11	Paulo Roberto Haddad	Paulo Roberto Haddad (born 1939)	19 October 1992	26 January 1993	99 days	Independent	Itamar Franco (MDB)
12	Yeda Crusius	Yeda Crusius (born 1944)	26 January 1993	7 May 1993	101 days	PSDB	Itamar Franco (MDB)
13	Alexis Stepanenko	Alexis Stepanenko (born 1938)	7 May 1993	3 March 1994	300 days	Independent	Itamar Franco (MDB)
14	Beni Veras	Beni Veras (1935–2015)	3 March 1994	1 January 1995	304 days	PSDB	Itamar Franco (MDB)
15	José Serra	José Serra (born 1942)	1 January 1995	30 April 1996	1 year, 120 days	PSDB	Fernando Henrique Cardoso (PSDB)
16	Antônio Kandir	Antônio Kandir (born 1953)	4 June 1996	30 March 1998	1 year, 299 days	PSDB	Fernando Henrique Cardoso (PSDB)
17	Paulo de Tarso Almeida Paiva	Paulo de Tarso Almeida Paiva (born 1940)	30 March 1998	30 March 1999	1 year, 0 days	Independent	Fernando Henrique Cardoso (PSDB)
18	Pedro Parente	Pedro Parente (born 1953)	30 March 1999	18 July 1999	110 days	Independent	Fernando Henrique Cardoso (PSDB)
19	Martus Tavares	Martus Tavares (born 1955)	18 July 1999	3 April 2002	2 years, 259 days	Independent	Fernando Henrique Cardoso (PSDB)
20	Guilherme Gomes Dias	Guilherme Gomes Dias (born 1961)	3 April 2002	1 January 2003	273 days	Independent	Fernando Henrique Cardoso (PSDB)
21	Guido Mantega	Guido Mantega (born 1949)	1 January 2003	18 November 2004	1 year, 322 days	PT	Luiz Inácio Lula da Silva (PT)
22	Nelson Machado	Nelson Machado (born 1948)	18 November 2004	22 March 2005	124 days	Independent	Luiz Inácio Lula da Silva (PT)
23	Paulo Bernardo	Paulo Bernardo (born 1952)	22 March 2005	1 January 2011	5 years, 285 days	PT	Luiz Inácio Lula da Silva (PT)
24	Miriam Belchior	Miriam Belchior (born 1958)	1 January 2011	1 January 2015	4 years, 0 days	PT	Dilma Rousseff (PT)
25	Nelson Barbosa	Nelson Barbosa (born 1969)	1 January 2015	18 December 2015	351 days	Independent	Dilma Rousseff (PT)
26	Valdir Moysés Simão	Valdir Moysés Simão (born 1960)	18 December 2015	12 May 2016	146 days	Independent	Dilma Rousseff (PT)
27	Romero Jucá	Romero Jucá (born 1954)	12 May 2016	23 May 2016	11 days	MDB	Michel Temer (MDB)
28	Dyogo Henrique de Oliveira	Dyogo Henrique de Oliveira (born 1975)	23 May 2016	7 April 2018	1 year, 319 days	Independent	Michel Temer (MDB)
29	Esteves Colnago	Esteves Colnago	7 April 2018	1 January 2019	269 days	Independent	Michel Temer (MDB)
30	Simone Tebet	Simone Tebet (born 1970)	1 January 2023	Incumbent	3 years, 285 days	MDB; PSB	Luiz Inácio Lula da Silva (PT)
