= Édipo Araújo =

Brazilian politician

Minister of Fishing and Aquaculture
- Incumbent
- Assumed office 1 April 2026
- President: Luiz Inácio Lula da Silva
- Preceded by: André de Paula

Personal details
- Party: Independent

Rivetla Édipo Araújo Cruz is a Brazilian politician serving as minister of fishing and aquaculture since 2026. From 2024 to 2026, he served as executive secretary of the Ministry of Fishing and Aquaculture.
