= Rachel Barros =

Brazilian politician (born 1983)

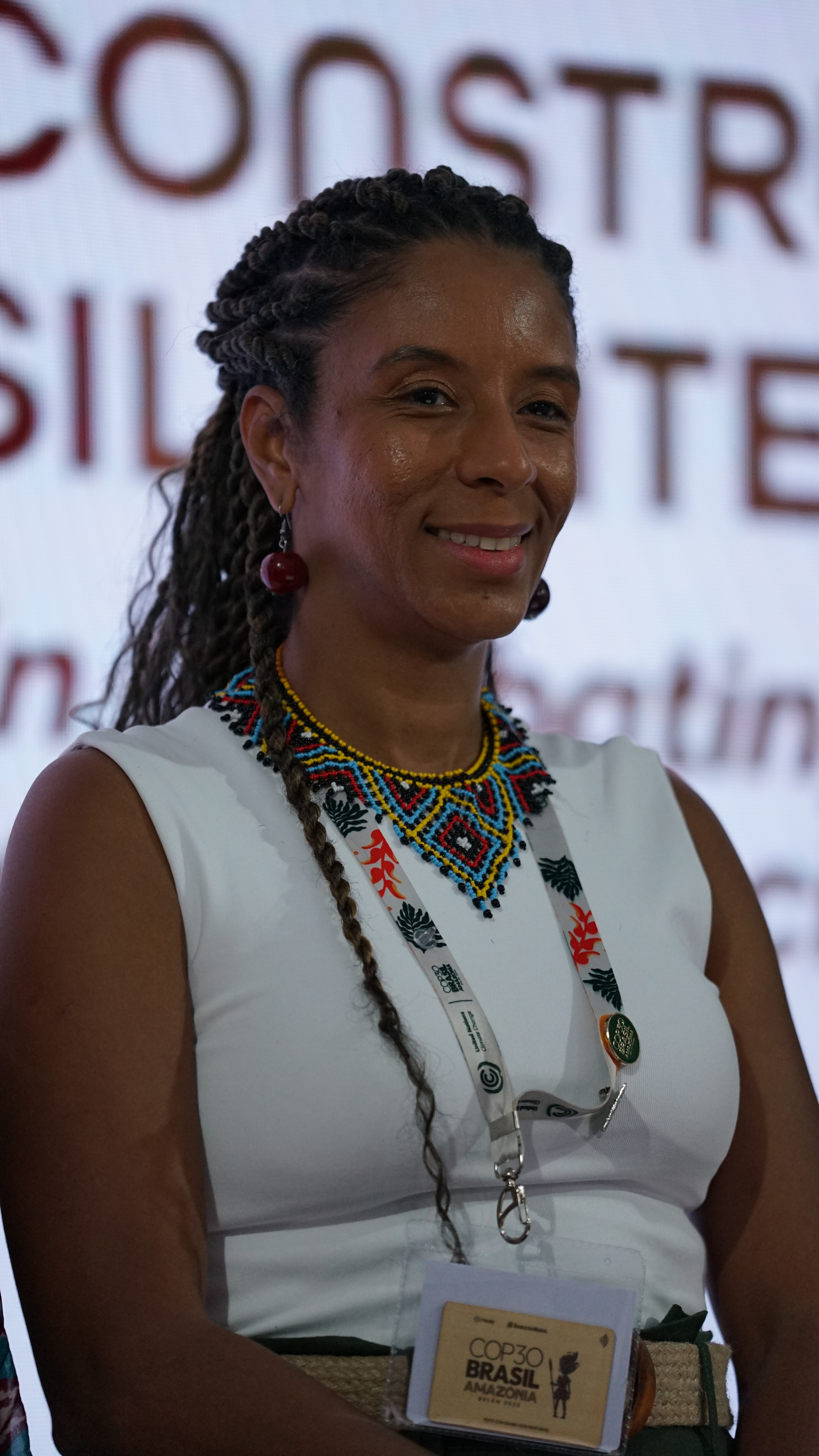
- Barros in 2025

Minister of Racial Equality
- Incumbent
- Assumed office 1 April 2026
- President: Luiz Inácio Lula da Silva
- Preceded by: Anielle Franco

Personal details
- Born: 18 March 1983 (age 43)
- Party: Independent

Rachel Barros de Oliveira (born 18 March 1983) is a Brazilian politician serving as minister of racial equality since 2026. From 2025 to 2026, she served as executive secretary of the Ministry of Racial Equality.
