= Bruno Moretti (politician) =

Brazilian politician

Minister of Planning
- Incumbent
- Assumed office 1 April 2026
- President: Luiz Inácio Lula da Silva
- Preceded by: Simone Tebet

Personal details
- Party: Independent

Bruno Moretti is a Brazilian politician serving as minister of planning since 2026. From 2025 to 2026, he served as chairman of Petrobras.
