= Ministry of Fishing and Aquaculture (Brazil) =

- Portuguese: Ministério da Pesca e Aquicultura

Agency overview
- Formed: 1 January 2003; 22 years ago
- Type: Ministry
- Jurisdiction: Federal government of Brazil
- Headquarters: Esplanada dos Ministérios, Bloco D Brasília, Federal District
- Annual budget: $275 m BRL (2023)
- Agency executives: André de Paula, Minister; Carlos de Mello Junior, Executive-Secretary; Tereza Viana Soares, Secretary of Aquaculture; Cristiano Ramalho, Secretary of Artisanal Fishing; Expedito Ferreira Netto, Secretary of Industrial, Amateur and Recreational Fishing; Flávia Frédou, Secretary of Registry, Monitoring and Research of Fishing and Aquaculture
- Website: www.gov.br/mpa/

The Ministry of Fishing and Aquaculture (Portuguese: Ministério da Pesca e Aquicultura, abbreviated MPA) is a cabinet-level federal ministry in Brazil. The ministry reported directly to the President of Brazil in formulating policies and guidelines for the development and promotion of fishing and aquaculture. It was established on January 1, 2003, as the Special Secretariat of Aquaculture and Fisheries (Secretaria Especial da Aquicultura e Pesca, SEAP). Its elevation to ministry level occurred on June 26, 2009, under Law No. 11,958.

== List of ministers ==
No.	Portrait	Minister	Took office	Left office	Time in office	Party	President
1	José Fritsch	José Fritsch (born 1954)	1 January 2003	31 March 2006	3 years, 89 days	PT	Luiz Inácio Lula da Silva (PT)
2	Altemir Gregolin	Altemir Gregolin (born 1964)	31 March 2006	1 January 2011	4 years, 276 days	PT	Luiz Inácio Lula da Silva (PT)
3	Ideli Salvatti	Ideli Salvatti (born 1952)	1 January 2011	10 June 2011	160 days	PT	Dilma Rousseff (PT)
4	Luiz Sérgio Nóbrega	Luiz Sérgio Nóbrega (born 1958)	10 June 2011	2 March 2012	266 days	PT	Dilma Rousseff (PT)
5	Marcelo Crivella	Marcelo Crivella (born 1957)	2 March 2012	17 March 2014	2 years, 15 days	Republicanos	Dilma Rousseff (PT)
6	Eduardo Lopes	Eduardo Lopes (born 1964)	17 March 2014	1 January 2015	290 days	Republicanos	Dilma Rousseff (PT)
7	Helder Barbalho	Helder Barbalho (born 1979)	1 January 2015	2 October 2015	274 days	MDB	Dilma Rousseff (PT)
8	André de Paula	André de Paula (born 1961)	1 January 2023	Incumbent	2 years, 85 days	PSD	Luiz Inácio Lula da Silva (PT)

== See also ==
- Other ministries of Fishing
- Ministry of Agrarian Development
- Ministry of Agriculture (Brazil)
