= André de Paula =

Brazilian lawyer and politician

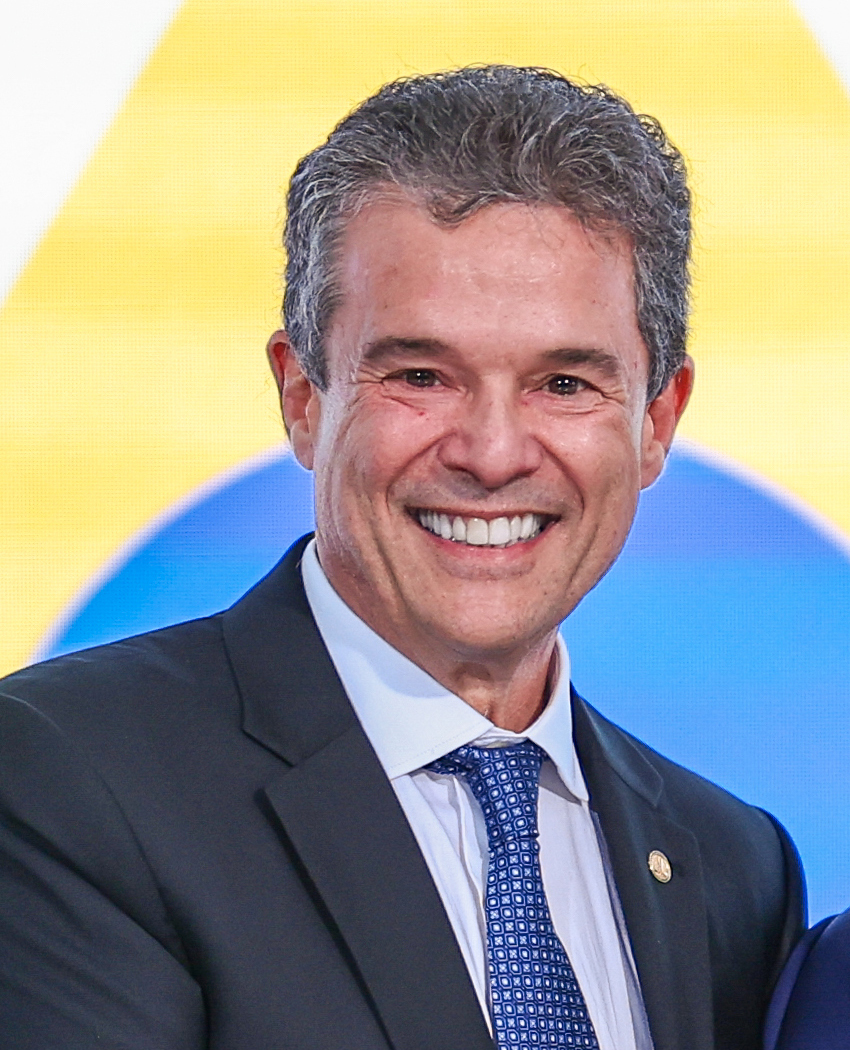

Minister of Agriculture and Livestock
- Incumbent
- Assumed office 1 April 2026
- President: Luiz Inácio Lula da Silva
- Preceded by: Carlos Fávaro

Minister of Fishing and Aquaculture
- In office 1 January 2023 – 31 March 2026
- President: Luiz Inácio Lula da Silva
- Preceded by: Helder Barbalho
- Succeeded by: Édipo Araújo

Federal Deputy
- In office 1 February 1999 – 1 February 2023
- Constituency: Pernambuco

State Deputy of Pernambuco
- In office 1 February 1991 – 1 February 1999
- Constituency: At-large

Personal details
- Born: André Carlos Alves de Paula Filho; 22 July 1961 (age 65) Recife, Pernambuco, Brazil
- Party: PSD (2011–present)
- Other political affiliations: PDS (1982–1988); DEM (1988–2011)
- Awards: Peacemaker Medal (Note: Portuguese: Medalha do Pacificador); Santos-Dumont Merit Medal

André Carlos Alves de Paula Filho (born 22 July 1961 in Recife) is a Brazilian lawyer and politician. He is regional chairman of the Social Democratic Party, a former member of the Chamber of Deputies for Pernambuco, former Minister of Fishing and Aquaculture and current Minister of Agriculture and Livestock.

== Biography ==
Son of André Carlos Alves de Paula and Maria Cândida Moura, André became Bachelor of Laws at the Federal University of Pernambuco in 1986.

He began his political life as a student, when he joined the Democratic Social Party in 1982 until 1988, when he switched to the Liberal Front Party. In this party, he was elected for the first time as a constituent city councillor and as a member of the Legislative Assembly of Pernambuco in 1991. In 1999, he took a seat as member of the Chamber of Deputies, being reelected in 2002, 2006 and 2010.

In state level, André de Paula headed the Secretariats of Labour and Social Action and Rural Production and Agrarian Reform of Pernambuco.

He was reelected for the Chamber in 2014 for the 55th Legislature. He voted for the impeachment of president Dilma Rousseff. During Michel Temer presidency, he voted for the Constitutional Amendment of the Public Expenditure Cap. In April 2017, he was favorable to the Labour Reform. In August 2017, André de Paula was favorable to the investigation process against president Michel Temer.

In December 2014, André was nominated for the Secretariat of Cities by governor Paulo Câmara, being replaced in the Chamber by Carlos Eduardo Cadoca. However, on 23 August 2016, he was replaced by Francisco Antônio Souza Papaléo, due to his intention to run for a new term in 2018, which was successful.

== Notes ==
Political offices
Preceded by Helder Barbalho	Minister of Fishing and Aquaculture; 2023–2026	Succeeded by Édipo Araújo
Preceded by {{{before}}}	Minister of Agriculture and Livestock; 2026–present	Incumbent
