= Tomé Franca =

Brazilian politician

Minister of Ports and Airports
- Incumbent
- Assumed office 1 April 2026
- President: Luiz Inácio Lula da Silva
- Preceded by: Silvio Costa Filho

Personal details
- Party: Independent

Tomé Barros Monteiro da Franca is a Brazilian politician serving as minister of ports and airports since 2026. From 2025 to 2026, he served as executive secretary of the Ministry of Ports and Airports.
