= Fernanda Machiaveli =

Brazilian politician

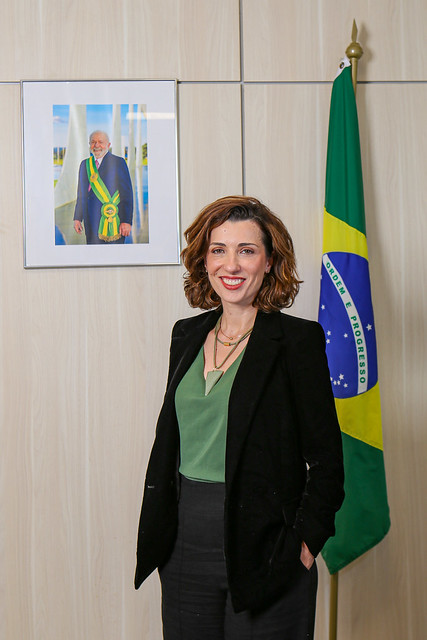
- Machiaveli in 2026

Minister of Agrarian Development
- Incumbent
- Assumed office 1 April 2026
- President: Luiz Inácio Lula da Silva
- Preceded by: Paulo Teixeira

Personal details
- Party: Independent

Fernanda Machiaveli Morão de Oliveira is a Brazilian politician serving as minister of agrarian development since 2026. From 2023 to 2026, she served as executive secretary of the Ministry of Agrarian Development.
