= Ministry of Planning, Budget and Management =

Cabinet-level federal ministry in Brazil

Ministry of Planning and Budget
- Portuguese: Ministério do Planejamento e Orçamento
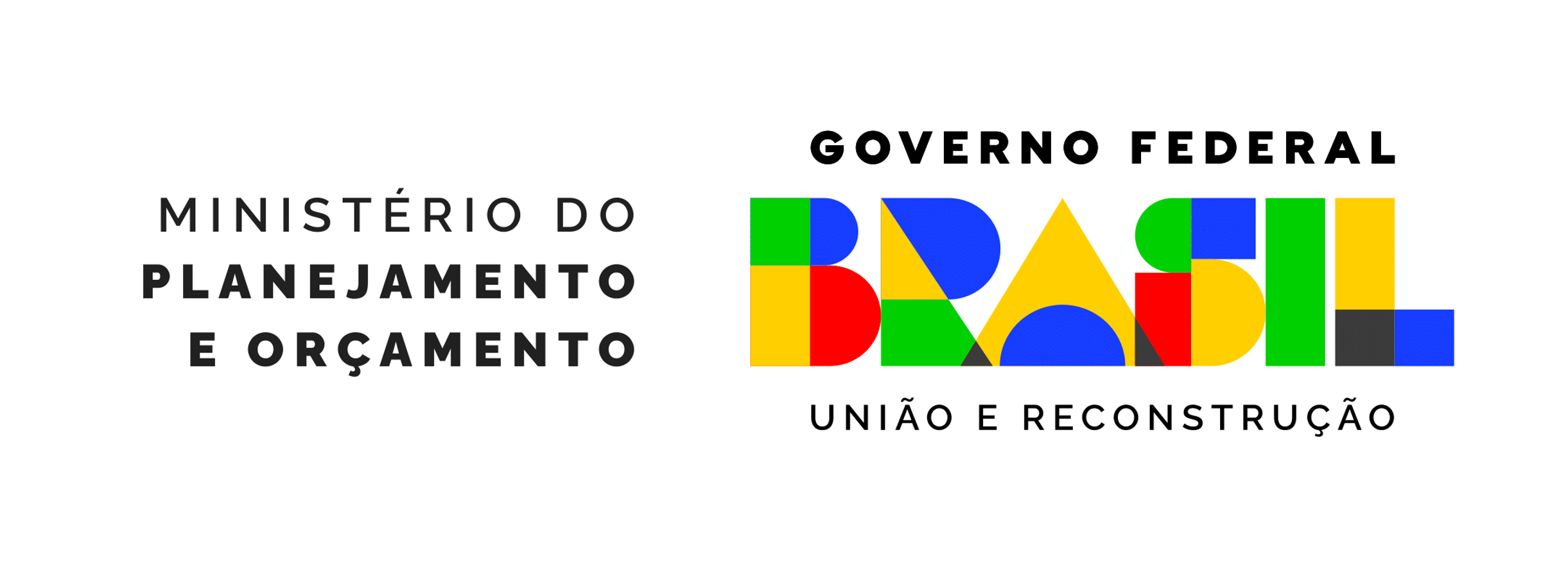

Agency overview
- Formed: 25 September 1962; 63 years ago
- Type: Ministry
- Jurisdiction: Federal government of Brazil
- Headquarters: Esplanada dos Ministérios, Bloco K Brasília, Federal District
- Annual budget: $3.075 b BRL (2023)
- Agency executives: Simone Tebet, Minister; Gustavo José de Guimarães e Souza, Executive-Secretary; João Victor Villaverde, Secretary of Institutional Affairs; Sérgio Firpo, Secretary of Monitoring and Evaluation of Public Policies and Economic Affairs; Renata Vargas, Secretary of International Affairs and Development; Virginia de Ângelis Oliveira de Paula, National Planning Secretary; Clayton Luiz Montes, Deputy Secretary of the Federal Budget Secretariat
- Website: www.gov.br/planejamento/

The Ministry of Planning, Budget, and Management (Portuguese: Ministério do Planejamento, Orçamento, e Gestão, abbreviated MP) is a cabinet-level federal ministry in Brazil. The Ministry was dissolved on 1 January 2019, but recreated on 1 January 2023 with Simone Tebet serving in the position.

== See also ==
- List of ministers of planning of Brazil
