= Leonardo Barchini =

Brazilian politician (born 1976)

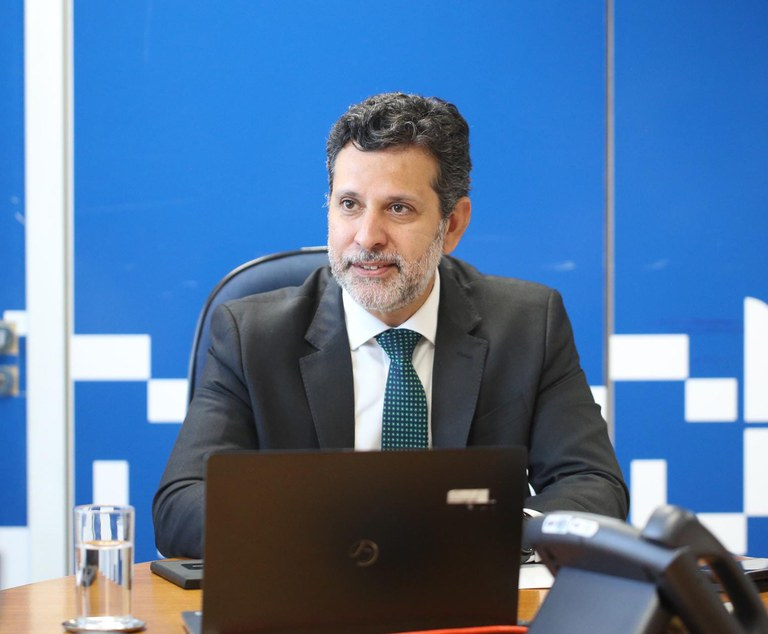
- Barchini in 2026

Minister of Education
- Incumbent
- Assumed office 2 April 2026
- President: Luiz Inácio Lula da Silva
- Preceded by: Camilo Santana

Personal details
- Born: 19 March 1976 (age 50)
- Party: Independent

Leonardo Osvaldo Barchini Rosa (born 19 March 1976) is a Brazilian politician serving as minister of education since 2026. From 2023 to 2026, he served as executive secretary of the Ministry of Education.
