= Federal government of Brazil =

- Portuguese: Governo Federal do Brasil
- Coat of arms of Brazil
- Formation: 15 November 1889
- Founding document: Constitution of Brazil
- Jurisdiction: Brazil
- Website: gov.br

Legislative branch
- Legislature: National Congress
- Meeting place: National Congress Palace

Executive branch
- Leader: President of the Republic
- Headquarters: Planalto Palace
- Main organ: Cabinet
- Departments: 38

Judicial branch
- Court: Supreme Federal Court
- Seat: Supreme Federal Court Palace

The federal government of Brazil (Governo Federal) (Note: Also known as the Union.) is the national government of the Federative Republic of Brazil, a republic in South America divided into 26 states and a federal district. The Brazilian state is divided into three branches: the executive, which is headed by the President, the head of state and government under a presidential system, and the cabinet; the legislative, whose powers are vested by the Constitution in the bicameral National Congress; and the judiciary, whose powers are vested in nine organs, including the Supreme Federal Court and lower federal courts. The seat of the federal government is located in Brasília.

== Division of powers ==
Brazil is a federal presidential constitutional republic, which is based on a representative democracy. The federal government has three independent branches: executive, legislative, and judicial.

The Federal Constitution is the supreme law of Brazil. It is the foundation and source of the legal authority underlying the existence of Brazil and the federal government. It provides the framework for the organization of the Brazilian government and for the relationship of the federal government to the states, to citizens, and to all people within Brazil.

Executive power is exercised by the executive, headed by the President, advised by a Cabinet of Ministers. The President is both the head of state and the head of government. Legislative power is vested upon the National Congress, a two-chamber legislature comprising the Federal Senate and the Chamber of Deputies. Judicial power is exercised by the judiciary, consisting of the Supreme Federal Court, the Superior Court of Justice and other Superior Courts, the National Justice Council and the regional federal courts.

== Logo evolution ==
1969–1974 (under the presidencies of Artur da Costa e Silva and Emílio Garrastazu Médici)

1974–1979 (under the presidency of Ernesto Geisel

1979–1985 (under the presidency of João Figueiredo)

1985–1988 (under the presidency of José Sarney)

1988–1990 (under the presidency of José Sarney)

1990–1992 (under the presidency of Fernando Collor de Mello)

1992–1995 (under the presidency of Itamar Franco)

1995–1997 (under the presidency of Fernando Henrique Cardoso)

1997–1999 (under the presidency of Fernando Henrique Cardoso)

1999–2002 (under the presidency of Fernando Henrique Cardoso)

2003–2005 (under the presidency of Luiz Inácio Lula da Silva)

2005-2011 (under the presidency of Luiz Inácio Lula da Silva)

2011–2015 (under the presidency of Dilma Rousseff)

2015-2016 (under the presidency of Dilma Rousseff)

2016–2018 (under the presidency of Michel Temer)

2018–2023 (under the presidency of Jair Bolsonaro)

2023–2025 (under the presidency of Luiz Inácio Lula da Silva)

2025–present (under the presidency of Luiz Inácio Lula da Silva)

== Executive branch ==
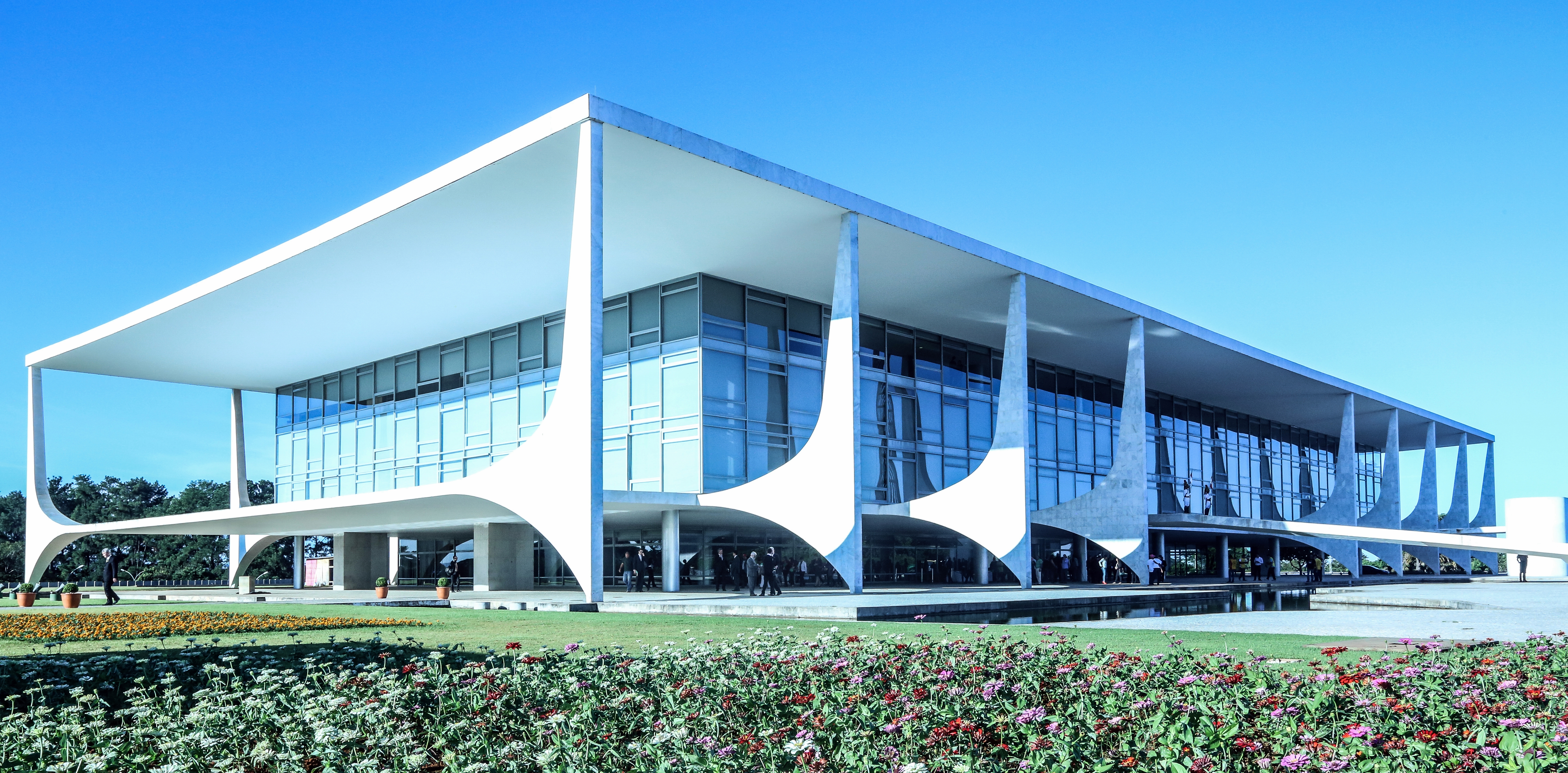
Palácio do Planalto, headquarters of the Executive Branch of the Brazilian Government

Main office-holders
Office	Name	Party	Since
President of the Republic	Luiz Inácio Lula da Silva	Workers' Party	1 January 2023
Vice President of the Republic	Geraldo Alckmin	Brazilian Socialist Party	1 January 2023

== Legislative branch ==
The bicameral National Congress (Congresso Nacional) consists of:

- The Federal Senate (Senado Federal), which has 81 seats — three members from each States and the Federal District, elected according to the principle of majority to serve eight-year terms. One-third are elected after a four-year period and two-thirds are elected after the next four-year period.
- The Chamber of Deputies (Câmara dos Deputados), which has 513 seats. Federal deputies are elected by proportional representation to serve four-year terms.

There are no limits on the number of terms one may serve for either chamber. The seats are allotted proportionally to each state's population, but each state is eligible for a minimum of eight seats and a maximum of 70 seats. The result is a system weighted in favor of smaller states that are part of the Brazilian federation.

Currently, 15 political parties are represented in Congress. Since it is common for politicians to switch parties, the proportion of congressional seats held by particular parties changes regularly. To avoid that, the Supreme Federal Court ruled in 2007 that the term belongs to the parties, and not to the representatives.

Main office-holders
Office	Name	Party	Since
President of the Federal Senate	Davi Alcolumbre	Brazil Union	1 February 2025
President of the Chamber of Deputies	Hugo Motta	Republicanos	1 February 2025

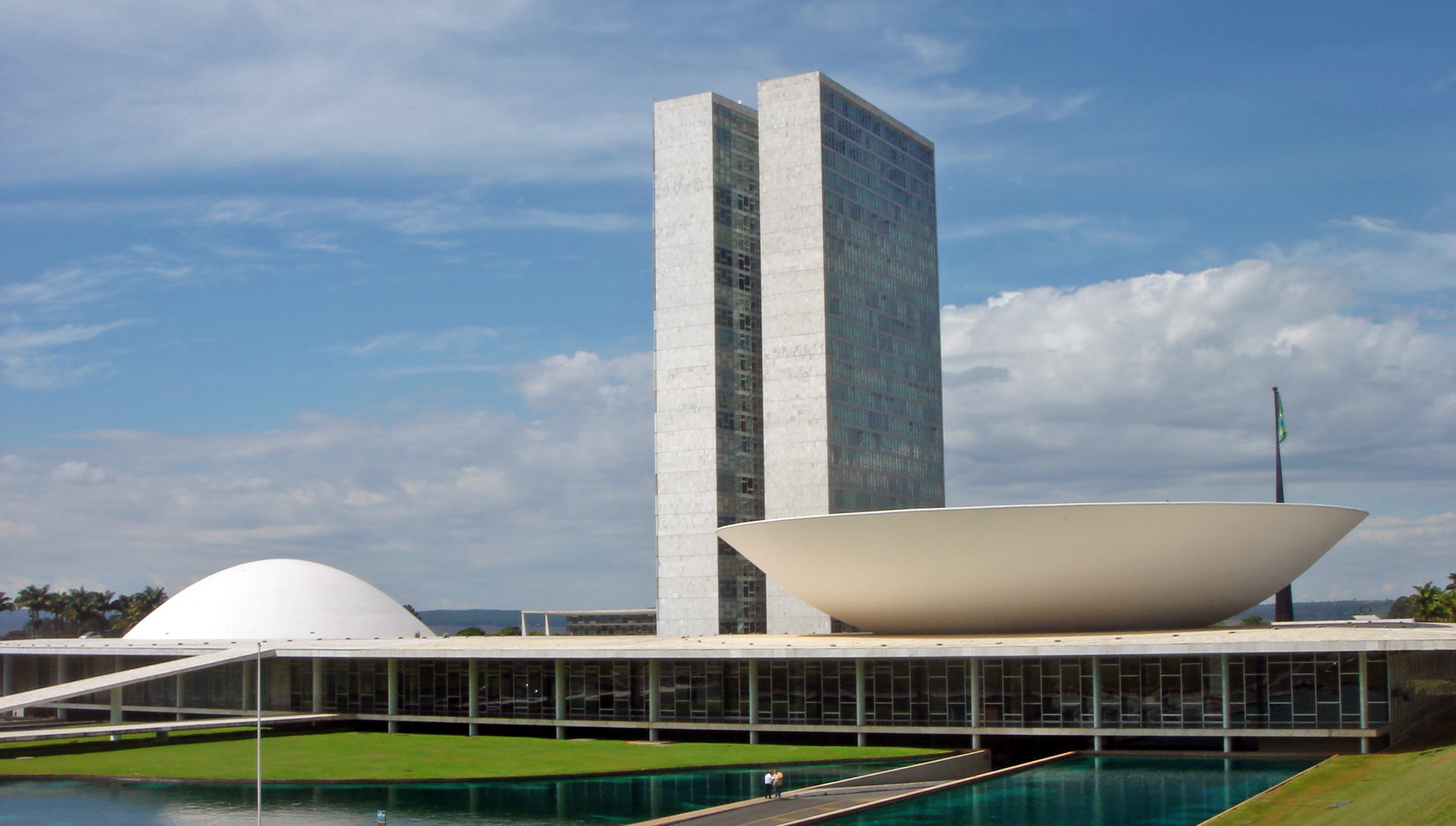
The National Congress building

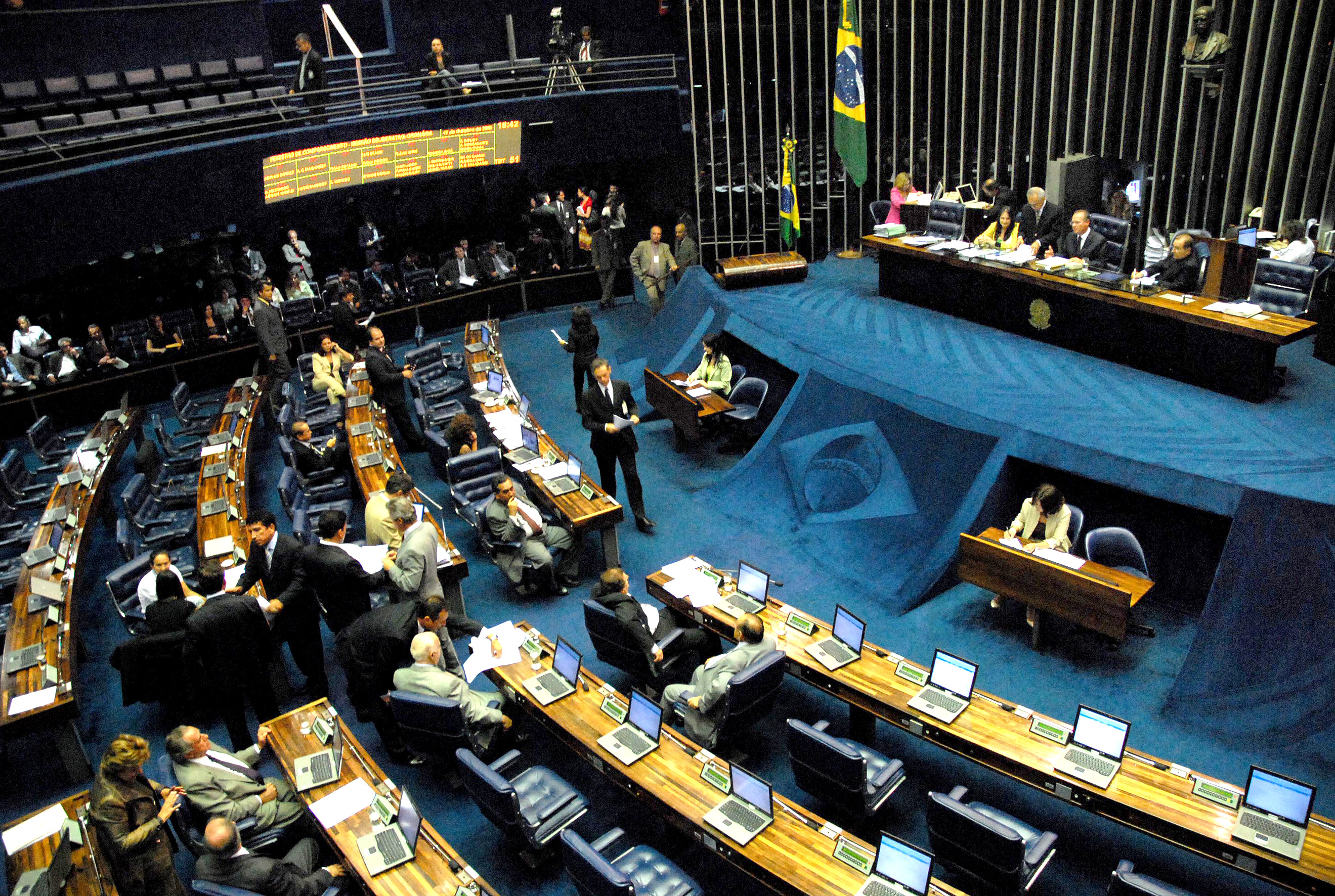
Federal Senate of Brazil, the upper house

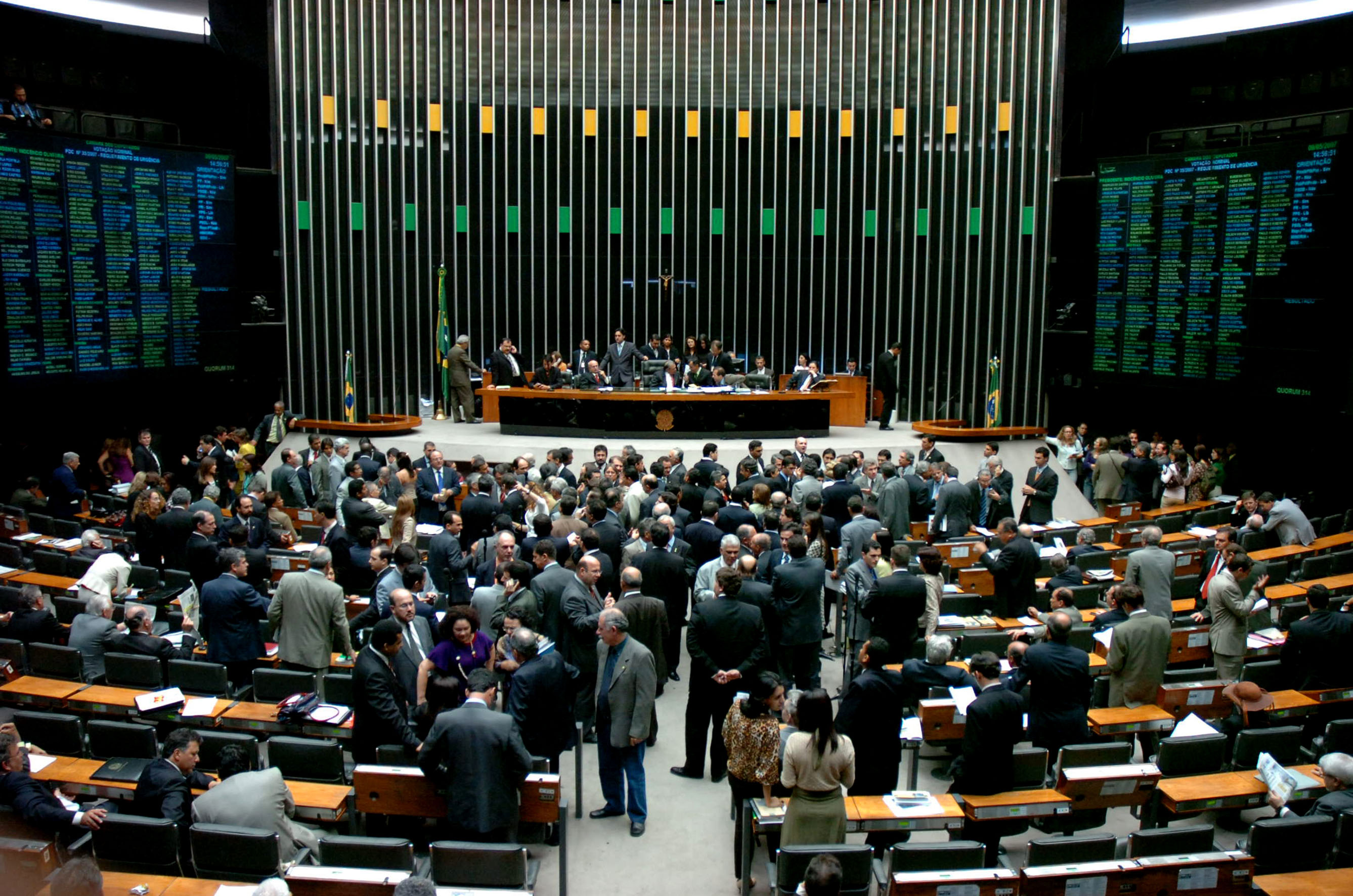
Chamber of Deputies of Brazil, the lower house

== Judicial branch ==
Brazilian courts function under civil law adversarial system. The Judicial branch is organized in states' and federal systems with different jurisdictions.

The judges of the courts of the first instance take office after public competitive examination. The second instance judges are promoted among the first instance judges. The Justices of the superior courts are appointed by the President for life and approved by the Senate. All the judges and justices must be graduated in law. Brazilian judges must retire at the age of 70.

=== Federal judicial branch ===
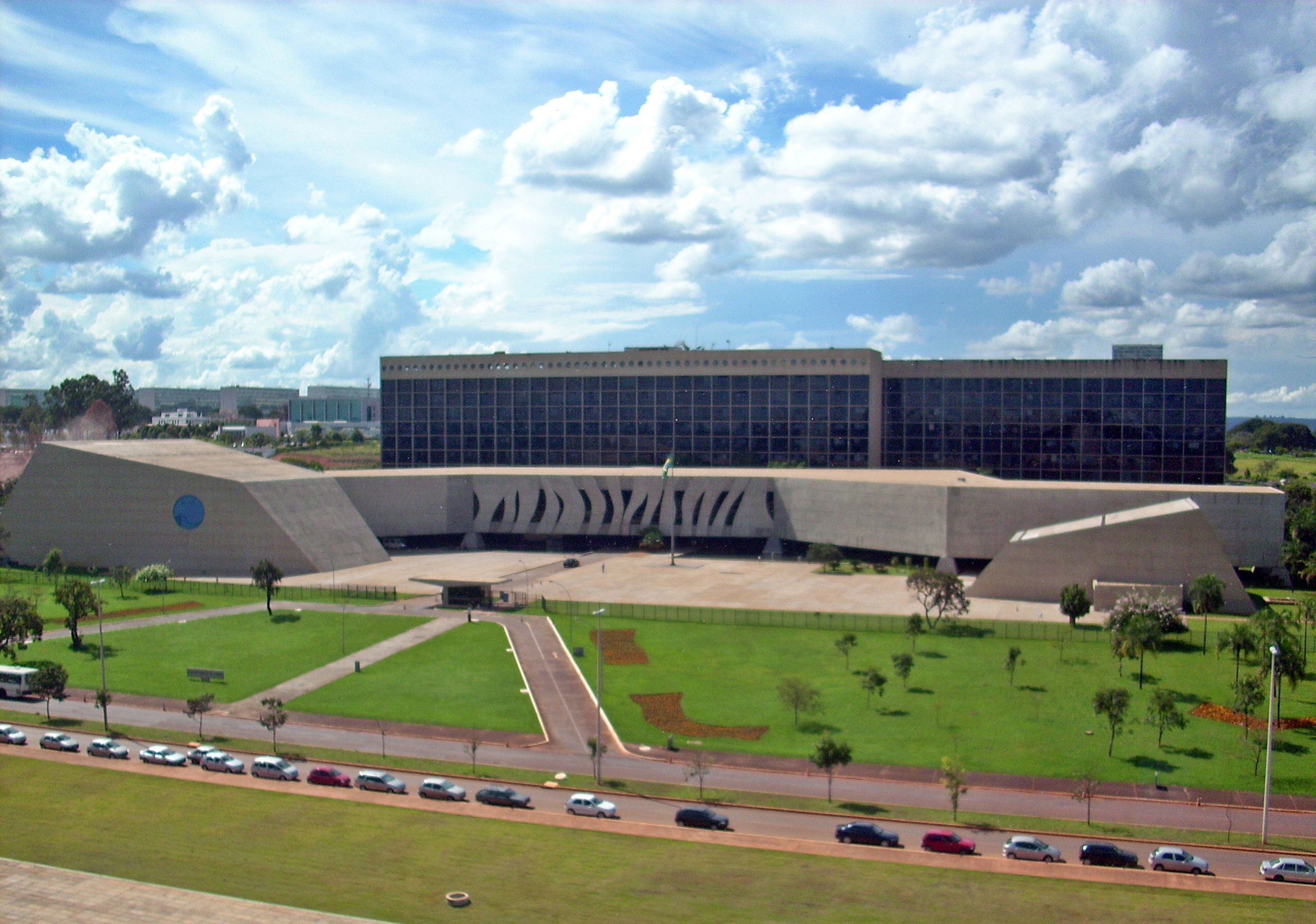
Superior Court of Justice

The national territory is divided into five regions, which are composed of two or more states. Each region is divided into Judiciary Sections (Seções Judiciárias in Portuguese), coterminous with the territory of each state, and subdivided in Judiciary Subsections (Subseções Judiciárias), each with a territory that may not correspond to the states' comarcas.

The Judiciary subsections have federal courts of the first instance and each Region has a Federal Regional Tribunal (Tribunal Regional Federal) as a court of the second instance.

There are special federal court systems, in which such as Labour Court (Justiça do Trabalho) for labor or employment-related matters and disputes, Election Justice (Justiça Eleitoral) for electoral matters, and Military Justice (Justiça Militar) for martial criminal cases, each of them with its own courts.

=== Superior Courts ===
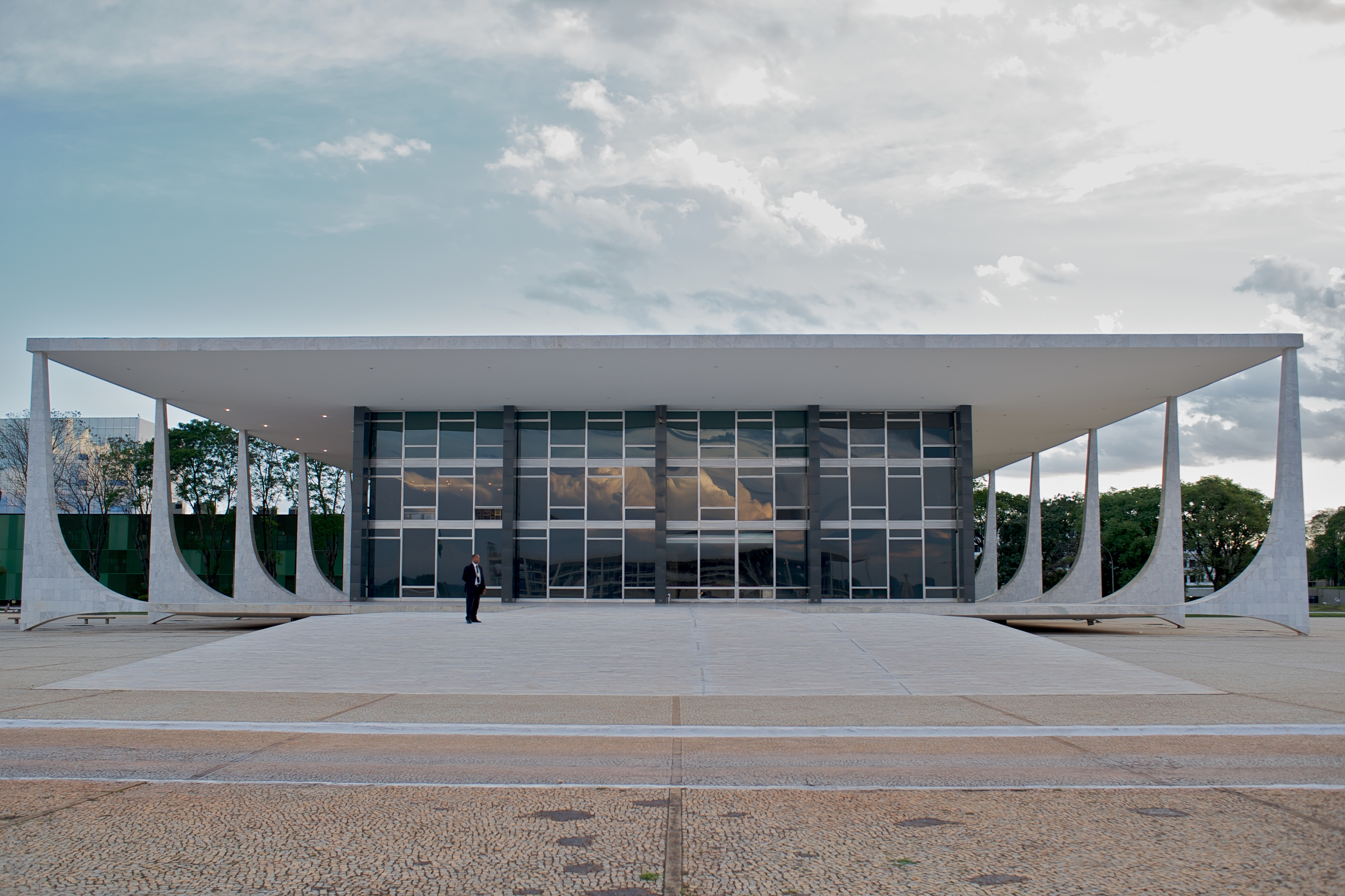
Supreme Federal Court

There are two national superior courts that grant writs of certiorari in civil and criminal cases: the Superior Justice Tribunal (Superior Tribunal de Justiça, STJ) and the federal supreme court, called the Supreme Federal Court (Portuguese: Supremo Tribunal Federal).

The STJ grants a Special Appeal (Recurso Especial) when a judgment of a court of the second instance offends a federal statute disposition, or when two or more second instance courts make different rulings on the same federal statute. There are parallel courts for labor law, electoral law and military law.

The STF grants Extraordinary Appeals (Recurso Extraordinário) when judgments of second instance courts violate the constitution. The STF is the last instance for the writ of habeas corpus and for reviews of judgments from the STJ.

The superior courts do not analyze any factual questions in their judgments, but only the application of the law and the constitution. Facts and evidence are judged by the courts of the second instance, except in specific cases such as writs of habeas corpus.

== See also ==
- Politics of Brazil
