= George Santoro =

Brazilian politician (born 1971)

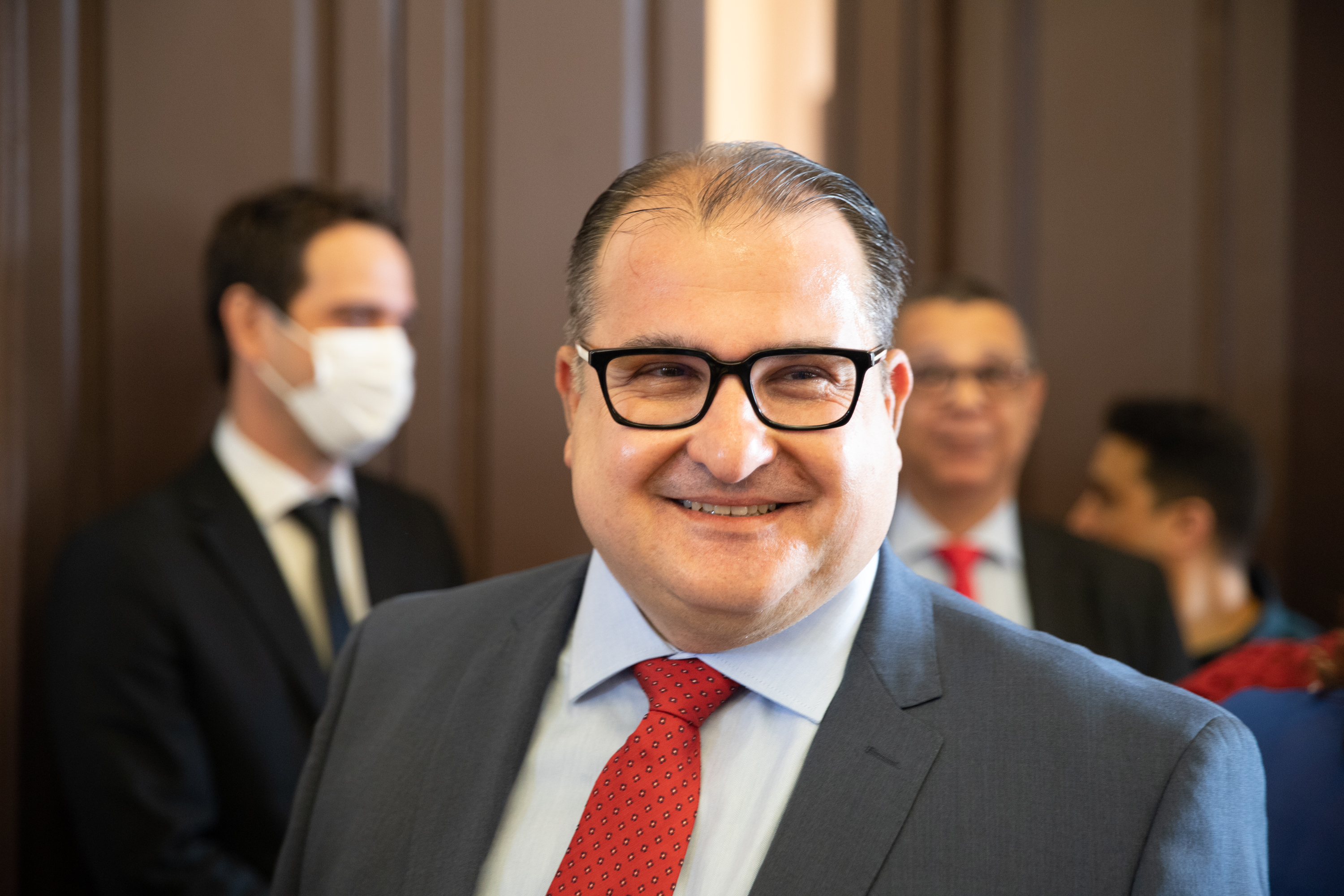
- Santoro in 2022

Minister of Transport
- Incumbent
- Assumed office 1 April 2026
- President: Luiz Inácio Lula da Silva
- Preceded by: Renan Filho

Personal details
- Born: 1 May 1971 (age 55)
- Party: Independent

George André Palermo Santoro (born 1 May 1971) is a Brazilian politician serving as minister of transport since 2026. From 2024 to 2026, he served as executive secretary of the Ministry of Transport.
