= Tarcísio de Freitas =

Brazilian engineer and politician (born 1975)

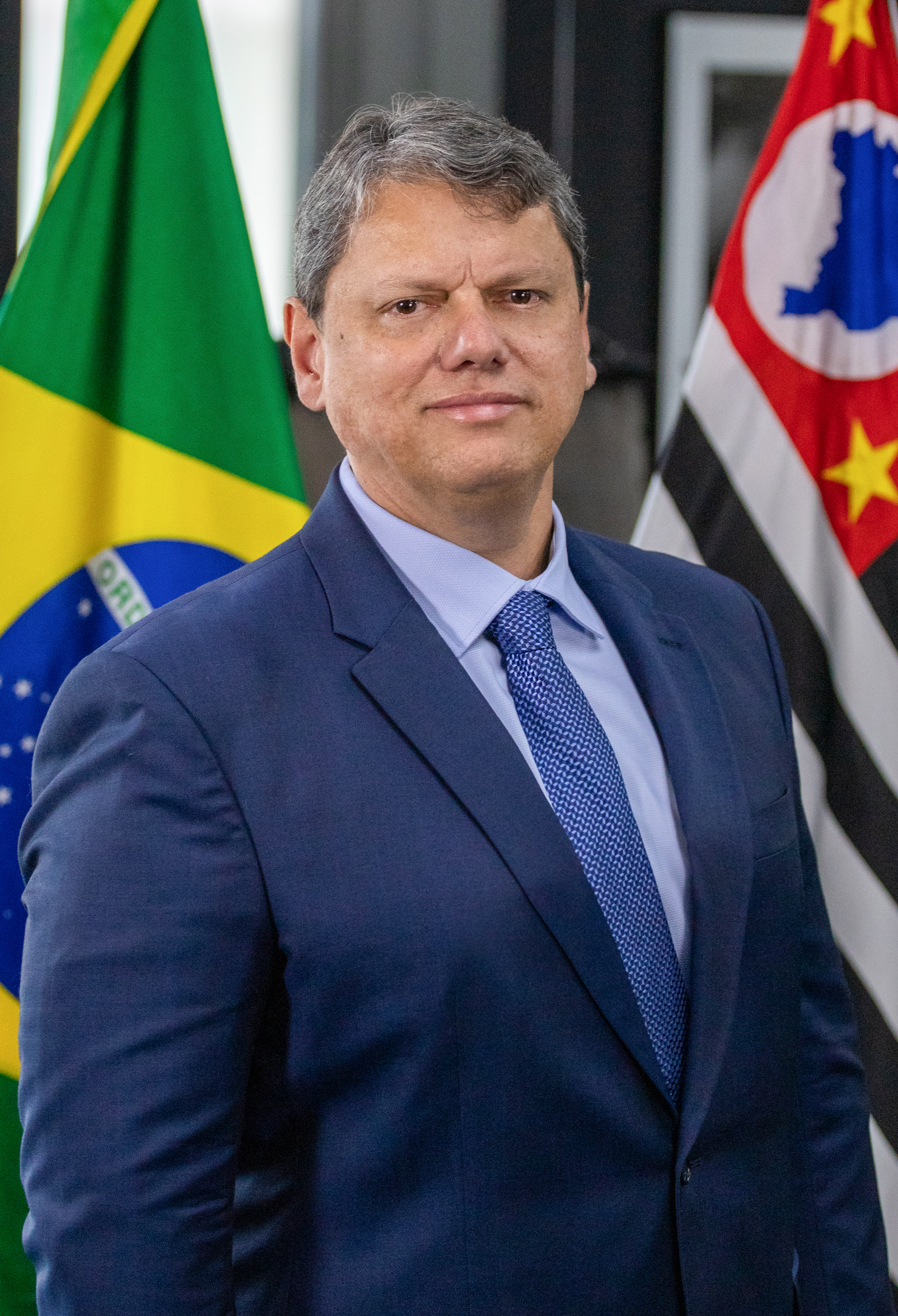
- Official portrait, 2023

Governor of São Paulo
- Incumbent
- Assumed office 1 January 2023
- Vice Governor: Felicio Ramuth
- Preceded by: Rodrigo Garcia

Minister of Infrastructure
- In office 1 January 2019 – 31 March 2022
- President: Jair Bolsonaro
- Preceded by: Valter Casimiro
- Succeeded by: Marcelo Sampaio

Director General of the National Department of Transport Infrastructure
- In office 22 September 2014 – 16 January 2015
- President: Dilma Rousseff
- Preceded by: Jorge Fraxe
- Succeeded by: Adailton Dias

Personal details
- Born: 19 June 1975 (age 51) Rio de Janeiro, Brazil
- Party: Republicanos (since 2022)
- Other political affiliations: Independent (2019–2022)
- Spouse: Cristiane Ferreira da Silva
- Children: 2
- Education: Military Academy of Agulhas Negras; Military Institute of Engineering
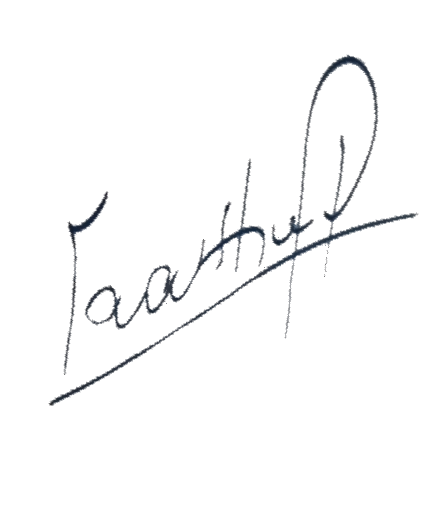
- Signature

Military service
- Allegiance: Brazil
- Branch/service: Brazilian Army
- Rank: Captain

Tarcísio Gomes de Freitas (born 19 June 1975) is a Brazilian politician, engineer, and former military captain currently serving as the 64th Governor of São Paulo since 1 January 2023. A member of the Republicans, he previously served as Minister of Infrastructure (Note: Succeeded by Marcelo Sampaio, Freitas' ministry now exists under Renan Filho (as minister of transport) and Silvio Costa Filho (as minister of ports and airports)) in the administration of President Jair Bolsonaro from 2019 to 2022.

Born in Rio de Janeiro and educated at the Military Institute of Engineering (IME), Freitas began his career as an engineer in the Brazilian Army before entering public administration. A key technocrat under Bolsonaro, he oversaw the privatization of ports and airports and the expansion of the national railway. In the 2022 São Paulo gubernatorial election runoff, he defeated former São Paulo mayor Fernando Haddad, ending nearly three decades of Brazilian Social Democracy Party (PSDB) rule. (Note: Cláudio Lembo of the Liberal Front Party (PFL) served as governor for 276 days from 2006 to 2007 and Márcio França of the Brazilian Socialist Party (PSB) served as governor for 270 days from 2018 to 2019. Neither was elected to the position, but served after the elected governor resigned to run for President.)

As governor, Freitas has maintained high approval pursuing a pro-market agenda, most notably including the 2024 privatization of Sabesp, the largest water utility in Latin America. He is widely considered a leading figure of the Brazilian right and a possible presidential candidate. Freitas won a second term as governor of São Paulo in the first round of voting in the 2026 São Paulo election with 62.65% of the vote.

== Early life and education ==
Tarcísio Gomes de Freitas was born on 19 June 1975 in Rio de Janeiro to Amaury Vieira Freitas and Maria Alice Gomes Freitas. His father, a salesman of humble origins who was raised in a favela, eventually secured a position working at the Banco do Brasil. His mother, a domestic worker, had emigrated to Brazil from Portugal.

At the age of three, Freitas relocated with his family to Águas Claras, a satellite city within the Federal District of Brasília, where he spent the remainder of his early childhood.

=== Education ===
Freitas began his military training at the Escola Preparatória de Cadetes do Exército (EsPCEx) in Campinas before enrolling in the Academia Militar das Agulhas Negras (AMAN). In 1996, he graduated first in his class with a degree in military sciences, commissioning into the Army’s engineering branch. Freitas later earned a civil engineering degree from the Military Institute of Engineering (IME) in 2002, achieving the highest historical grade point average in the institution's history, followed by a master's in transport engineering in 2008 from the same institution.

His technical background is defined by specialized training in public administration, including an MBA in project management from Fundação Getulio Vargas (2003) and international certifications in public–private partnerships and procurement from institutions in London and Rome.

== Early career ==
Freitas served as a second lieutenant commanding a platoon at the 10th Combat Engineering Company in Natal, Rio Grande do Norte (1997–1998). He was subsequently assigned to the 2nd Engineering Group in Manaus, Amazonas (2003–2006), where he oversaw infrastructure projects across the Amazon region, including federal highway maintenance and riverine construction, also auditing public works.

From November 2005 to June 2006, he served as Chief of the Technical Section for the Brazilian Engineering Company within the United Nations Stabilization Mission in Haiti (MINUSTAH), managing reconstruction efforts following the 2004 coup d'état and damage from Hurricane Jeanne.

=== Early administrative and government service ===
Freitas resigned his commission at the rank of Captain in October 2008 to join the federal civil service as a finance and control analyst at the office of the Comptroller General (CGU). He served first as an adviser in the infrastructure audit directorate (2008–2011) and then as coordinator-general for audits of the transport sector (March–August 2011).

In August 2011, Freitas was appointed Executive Director of the National Department of Transport Infrastructure (DNIT) during a reorganisation of the Dilma Rousseff administration. He subsequently succeeded Jorge Fraxe as Director-General, a position Freitas held from September 2014 until January 2015.

Following his departure from DNIT in January 2015, Freitas placed first in the public competition for legislative consultant at the Chamber of Deputies, where he specialised in urban development and transport law until 2016.

==== Secretary for Project Coordination ====
With the impeachment of Dilma Rousseff and the formation of the Temer administration, Freitas was appointed Secretary for Project Coordination within the newly established Investment Partnership Program (PPI), serving under Moreira Franco.

Freitas' tenure focused on structuring several major auctions. He oversaw the fourth round of airport concessions, covering Fortaleza, Salvador, Florianópolis, and Porto Alegre. Freitas also implemented port terminal leasing arrangements at Santarém and Vila do Conde. In this capacity, he was a principal architect of the federal government's shift toward a structured concession and privatisation model aimed at attracting foreign capital.

== Minister of Infrastructure ==
In November 2018, President-elect Jair Bolsonaro appointed Freitas to lead the newly created Ministry of Infrastructure, formed by merging the former ministries of Transport, Ports, and Civil Aviation. He took office on 1 January 2019.

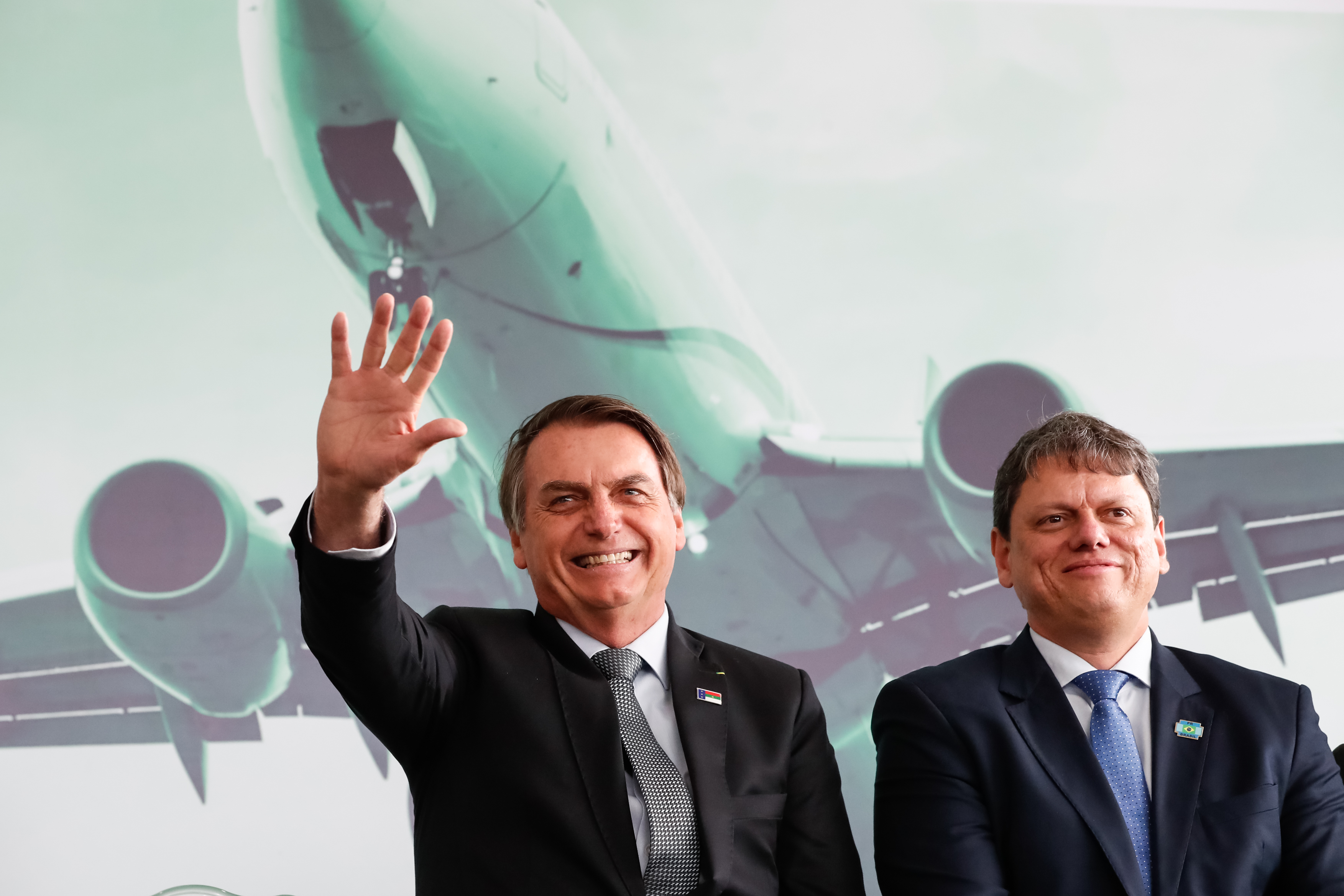
Freitas, as minister in 2019, with Jair Bolsonaro, opening Glauber Rocha Airport in Vitória da Conquista, Bahia

=== Privatization ===
==== Aviation ====
Under Freitas, the Ministry of Infrastructure pursued an accelerated airport concession programme using a cluster model that bundled high-traffic hubs with smaller regional airports to improve the commercial viability of less profitable terminals. Between 2017 and 2021, the government had already privatized 22 airports.

The airports were divided into three regional blocks (South, Central, and North) attracting bids at a premium of over 3,000 per cent above the government's minimum, totalling 3.3 billion reais, with concessionaires additionally committing to 6.1 billion reais in terminal investment over 30 years. The Brazilian infrastructure group CCR, now Motiva, acquired the South block for 2.1 billion reais and the Central block for 754 million reais, while French operator Vinci Airports won the North block for 420 million reais.

==== Ports ====
On 30 March 2022, the federal government privatised the Companhia Docas do Espírito Santo (CODESA), the first transfer of a Brazilian port authority to private management. A proposal to privatise the Santos Port Authority, the largest in Latin America, was structured during his tenure but suspended following the change of federal administration after the 2022 presidential election.

=== Infrastructure projects and concessions ===
Freitas prioritzed completing road and rail projects amid the uncertainty of the COVID-19 pandemic.

==== Roads ====
BR-163, known informally as the "Soy Highway," runs approximately 3,500 kilometres from Rio Grande do Sul to Santarém, Pará, and serves as the primary export corridor for grain produced in Mato Grosso, Brazil's largest agricultural state. Construction of the highway began in 1976, but most of its stretch through the state of Pará remained unpaved for decades. Paving of the final section between Sinop, Mato Grosso and Miritituba, Pará was completed in November 2019, with the work carried out by two army engineering and construction battalions.The completion of the corridor reduced the round trip for grain trucks from ten to four days and, according to the Ministry of Infrastructure, reduced freight costs by approximately 26 per cent. However, the speed of the project raised environmental concerns.

In December 2020 the Ministry inaugurated the Guaíba Bridge in Porto Alegre to relieve congestion and improve access to the Port of Rio Grande.

==== Rail ====
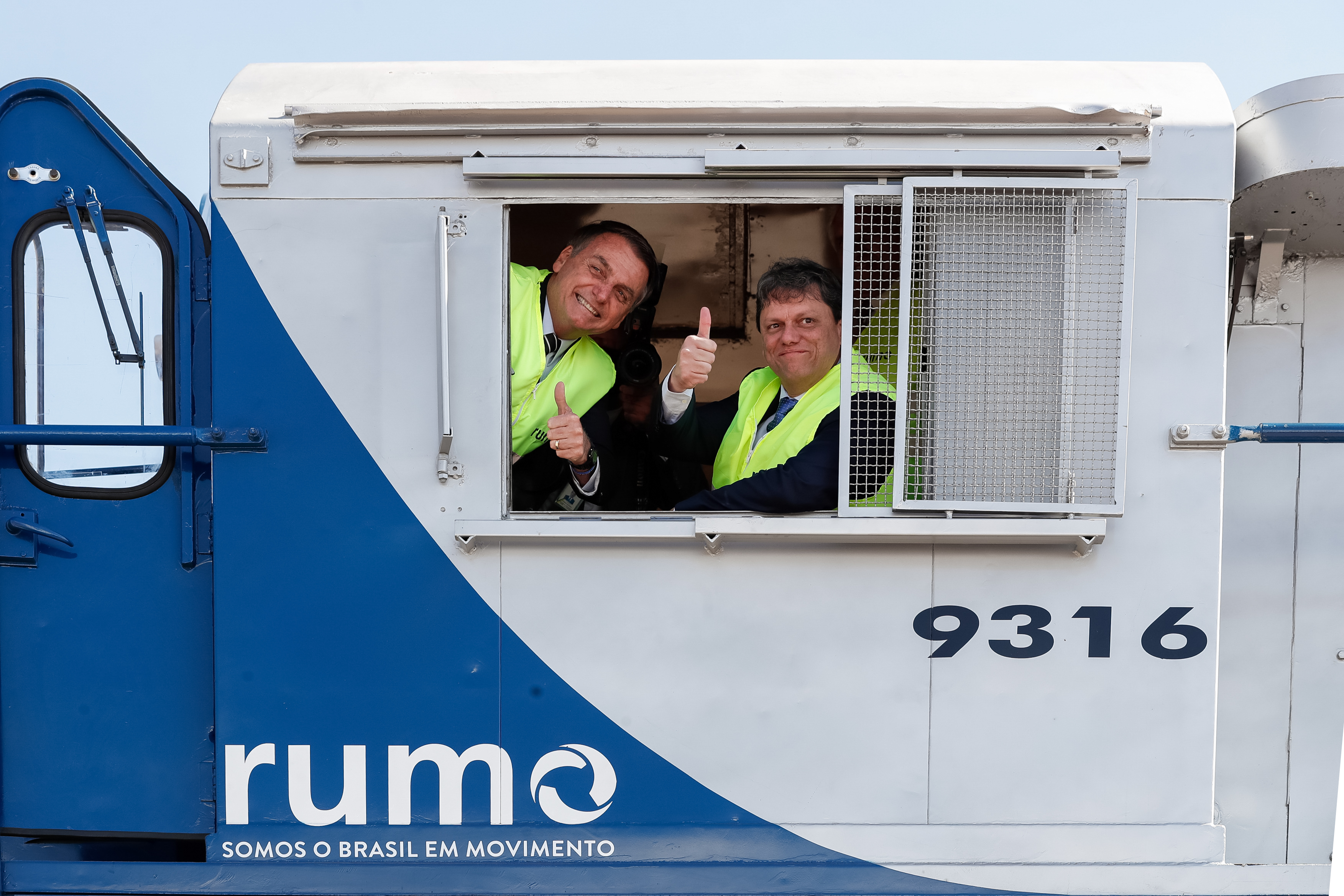
Bolsonaro and Freitas pose in 2019, at the North–South Railway.

On 28 March 2019, Freitas' Ministry auctioned the 1,537-kilometre central stretch of the Norte–Sul Railway between Porto Nacional, Tocantins, to Estrela d’Oeste, São Paulo. Rumo Logística acquired the concession for 2,719,530,000 reais under a 30-year non-extendable contract, signed in Goiás on 31 July 2019. Rumo's bid was double the reserve price of 1.35 billion reais, and significantly ahead of the competing offer of 2.06 billion reais submitted by VLI Multimodal S.A., a consortium backed by Vale, Mitsui, and Brookfield.

The proposed Ferrogrão railway (EF-170), a 933-kilometre line intended to connect Sinop to Miritituba and run broadly parallel to BR-163, was suspended in March 2021. Justice Alexandre de Moraes of the Supreme Federal Court issued an injunction suspending Law 13.452/2017, which had altered the boundaries of Jamanxim National Park in Pará to accommodate the railway's route, on the grounds that protected conservation units could not be modified by provisional measure rather than formal legislation.

The suspension paralysed the concession proceedings pending a final verdict; as of 2021 no date for the full tribunal ruling had been set.

=== Legislative reforms ===
Two significant legislative frameworks were enacted during Freitas's tenure:

- The New Legal Framework for Railways (Law 14.273/2021) introduced an authorisation regime permitting private companies to propose and construct rail lines without a public tender. It was sanctioned in December 2021 with vetoes. Parliament later overturned several of those vetoes in 2023, clarifying aspects of the framework.
- The BR do Mar programme (Law 14.301/2022) liberalised coastal shipping by relaxing vessel chartering rules and reducing barriers to foreign-flagged ships. The measure was signed with partial vetoes in January 2022 by President Lula.

Freitas resigned in March 2022 to contest the governorship of São Paulo. During his tenure, the ministry conducted nearly 100 auctions and secured over 100 billion reais in contracted private investment.

== Governor of São Paulo ==
=== 2022 gubernatiorial election ===
==== Candidacy and coalition ====
Freitas was launched as the Republicanos candidate for governor at the party’s 30 July 2022 convention in São Paulo, an event attended by President Jair Bolsonaro. Felicio Ramuth, the Mayor of São José dos Campos from the Social Democratic Party (PSD), was announced as his running mate. The deal was arranged by Gilberto Kassab, the PSD president and former São Paulo mayor. The electoral court subsequently recorded the ticket under the coalition “São Paulo Pode Mais.”

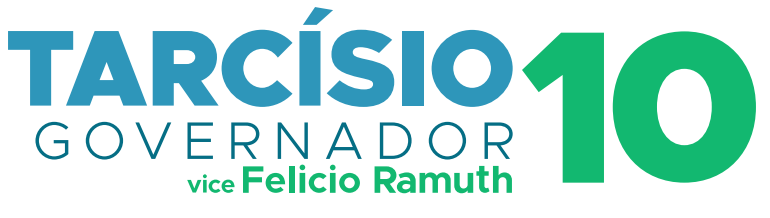
Freitas' gubernatiorial campaign logo

It was his first electoral campaign; he had no prior connection to São Paulo state politics beyond a period of military training, and had been personally selected for the race by Bolsonaro, whose support had launched his entire political career. Earlier that year, challenges to his transfer of voter registration from Brasília to São José dos Campos were rejected by the São Paulo regional electoral court as either untimely or unproven, allowing the candidacy to proceed.

==== Platform and messaging ====
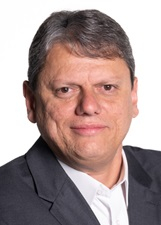
Freitas' image submitted to the TSE.

Freitas's platform centred on expanding public–private concessions, public security, and the reduction of state taxes including the IPVA and ICMS. His rhetoric positioned his candidacy as a break from the four consecutive PSDB administrations that had governed São Paulo since 1995, rather than a continuation of them.

On security, Freitas argued publicly against police body cameras, contending that their removal would signal that the state stood behind its officers. He also proposed reducing the age of criminal responsibility and building dedicated facilities for semi-open regime prisoners. On fiscal matters, he committed to maintaining ICMS on fuel at 18 per cent, crediting the reduction to Bolsonaro's national government.

Freitas entered the race polling at approximately 17 per cent against Haddad's 32 per cent. He participated in multiple televised debates, including those hosted by TV Bandeirantes and TV Globo, where exchanges between the candidates frequently extended beyond state policy to the rival national presidencies of Bolsonaro and Lula.

==== Paraisópolis shooting incident ====
On 17 October 2022, a campaign visit to the Paraisópolis neighbourhood in São Paulo was interrupted by gunfire in the vicinity. Freitas and his team were unharmed; police reported the death of one suspect.

Bolsonaro's campaign and aligned media immediately characterised the episode as a direct attack on Freitas's motorcade. Freitas himself, in his first press conference, declined to use the word "attack." Questions subsequently arose over the police report's account of events and reports that footage from body cameras at the scene had been requested to be deleted. The incident narrowed Freitas's polling lead from ten points to a statistical tie of 52 to 48 per cent in the final days of the campaign.

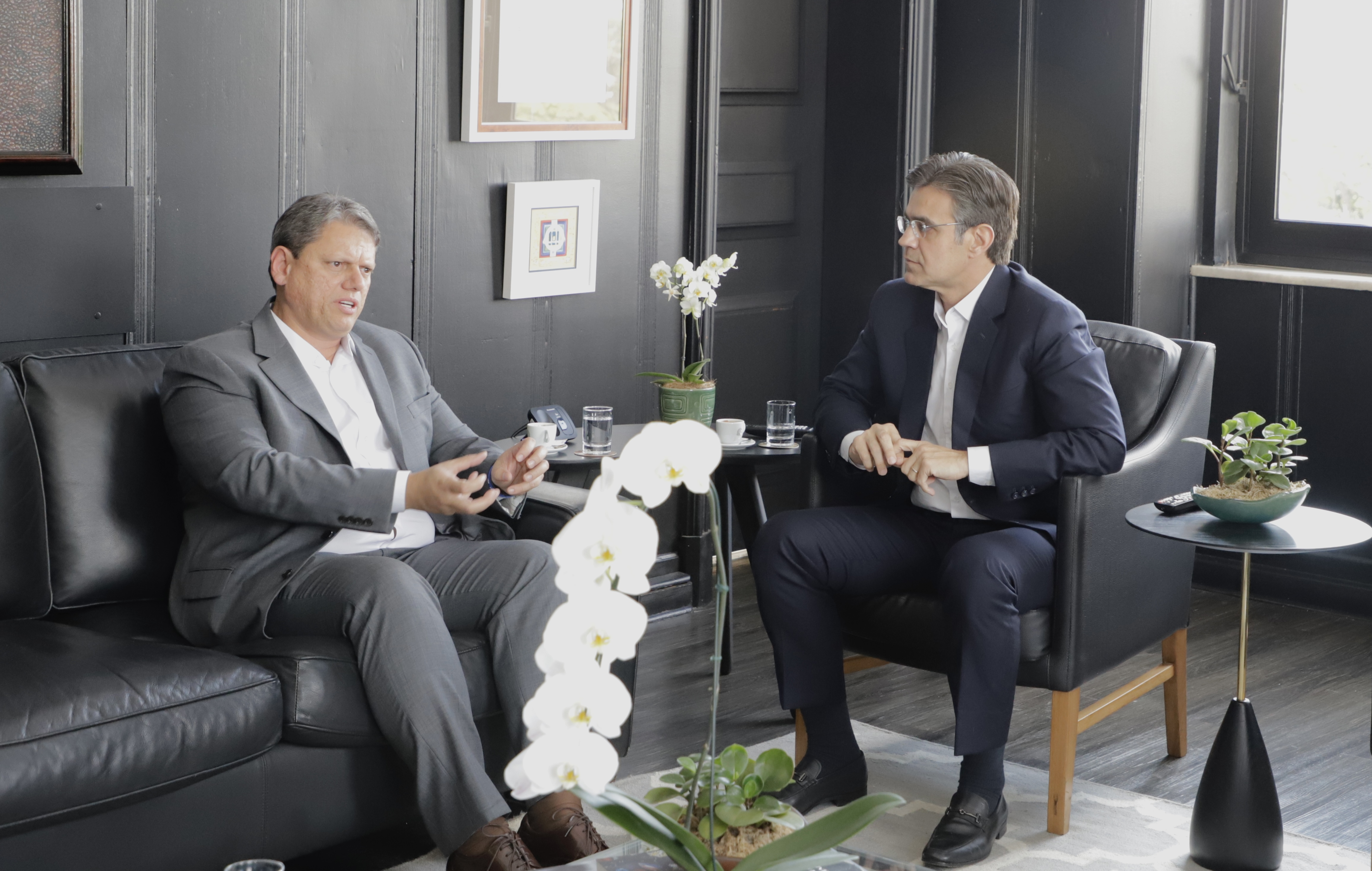
Freitas meeting with his predecessor Rodrigo Garcia after his victory in 2022.

==== Results ====
In the first round on 2 October 2022, Freitas led with 42.3 per cent of valid votes against Haddad's 35.7 per cent. Incumbent governor Rodrigo Garcia of the PSDB finished third with 18.4 per cent, ending the party's 28-year hold on the state and, after his elimination, endorsing Freitas for the runoff. In the runoff on 30 October, Freitas defeated Haddad by 55.3 per cent to 44.7 per cent of valid votes, according to official totals from the Superior Electoral Court. He won 566 of São Paulo's 645 municipalities, dominating the rural interior, while Haddad prevailed in the city of São Paulo and a number of other urban centres.

=== Term as Governor ===
Freitas took office on 1 January 2023 at the Palácio dos Bandeirantes, where he and Lieutenant Governor Felício Ramuth were sworn in alongside a cabinet of 24 secretaries. The secretariat included Gilberto Kassab as Secretary of Government and Institutional Relations, Samuel Kinoshita at Finance and Planning, and Caio Paes de Andrade, a former president of Petrobras, at Management and Digital Government.

In the same week, Freitas revoked the nomination of a relative by marriage to a senior advisory post following public criticism, while retaining the appointment of Michelle Bolsonaro's brother as a special adviser.

In his inaugural address, Freitas described the responsibility of governing São Paulo, which he noted would rank as the world's 21st largest economy if it were a sovereign state, and committed to attending to social demands as the primary driver of state action.

==== Water and sanitation ====
The privatisation of the Companhia de Saneamento Básico do Estado de São Paulo (Sabesp), Latin America's largest water utility, was the most significant transaction of Freitas's first term. The São Paulo state legislature approved authorising Sabesp's privatisation in December 2023, though the session was suspended after security forces used pepper spray to clear anti-privatisation protesters from the public gallery, with opposition deputies from the PT and PSOL absent for the vote. Unions and social movements organised two days of strike action and a popular referendum attracting close to 900,000 participants. In May 2024, 305 mayors approved a unified post-privatisation contract with the newly constituted Regional Unit URAE-1, covering 371 municipalities through to 2060.

The share sale closed in July 2024 — Latin America's largest equity offering since the Eletrobras privatisation in 2022 — raising approximately R$14.8 billion and reducing the state's stake from 50.3% to 18.3%. Equatorial Energia, the sole anchor bidder, acquired a 15% stake subject to a five-year lock-up; the remaining 17% sold to institutional investors was more than 30 times subscribed. President Lula's party sought a Supreme Federal Court injunction two days before pricing; the court rejected the motion. New management installed in October 2024 committed to R$70 billion in investment by 2029 and R$260 billion by 2060 to achieve universal water and sanitation coverage, with tariff increases moderated by a universalisation support fund (FAUSP) capitalised from sale proceeds.

==== Transport and concessions ====
The administration's flagship transport initiative was SP nos Trilhos ("São Paulo on the Rails"), a programme structured by the Secretariat of Investment Partnerships. By 2025 the programme had brought together more than 40 projects totalling approximately R$190 billion in estimated investments already contracted or under development, covering over 1,000 kilometres of new rail lines connecting Greater São Paulo to the interior and the coast. The programme encompassed intercity passenger corridors, metropolitan suburban lines, metro extensions, and light rail projects in secondary cities.

===== Rodoanel Norte =====
In March 2023, the Via Appia Infraestrutura fund won the auction to complete the northern segment of the Rodoanel, São Paulo's orbital motorway, with a contractual investment of roughly R$3.4 billion and a delivery target of 2026. The concession contract was signed in August 2023.

===== Trem Intercidades – Eixo Norte =====
On 29 February 2024, the state auctioned the Trem Intercidades Eixo Norte corridor, covering the development of a São Paulo–Campinas regional intercity service, an Intermetropolitano service between Jundiaí and Campinas, and the operation of suburban CPTM Line 7–Rubi. A consortium led by Comporte Participações and China's CRRC Hong Kong (operating as C2 Mobilidade Sobre Trilhos) won the 30-year contract, which foresees R$14.2 billion in investment, with intercity services between São Paulo and Campinas expected to begin in 2031. The concession contract was signed at a ceremony in Campinas on 3 June 2024, at which Freitas formally launched the SP nos Trilhos programme.

===== Lines 8 and 9 =====
Concessionaire ViaMobilidade recorded 132 service failures on Lines 8–Diamante and 9–Esmeralda in the year to January 2023, seven times the rate recorded under public operator CPTM in the preceding year, prompting the São Paulo public prosecutor's office to seek termination of the concession contract. In August 2023 the MPSP reached an agreement with ViaMobilidade requiring an indemnity of R$150 million and the acceleration of R$636 million in contracted network investments.

In May 2025 the state government signed a further contract addendum under which approximately R$179 million in accumulated penalty assessments were converted into mandated network modernisation, principally the installation of the European Train Control System (ETCS) on both lines, with total new investment of R$1 billion, of which R$590 million will be disbursed by the state over seven years.

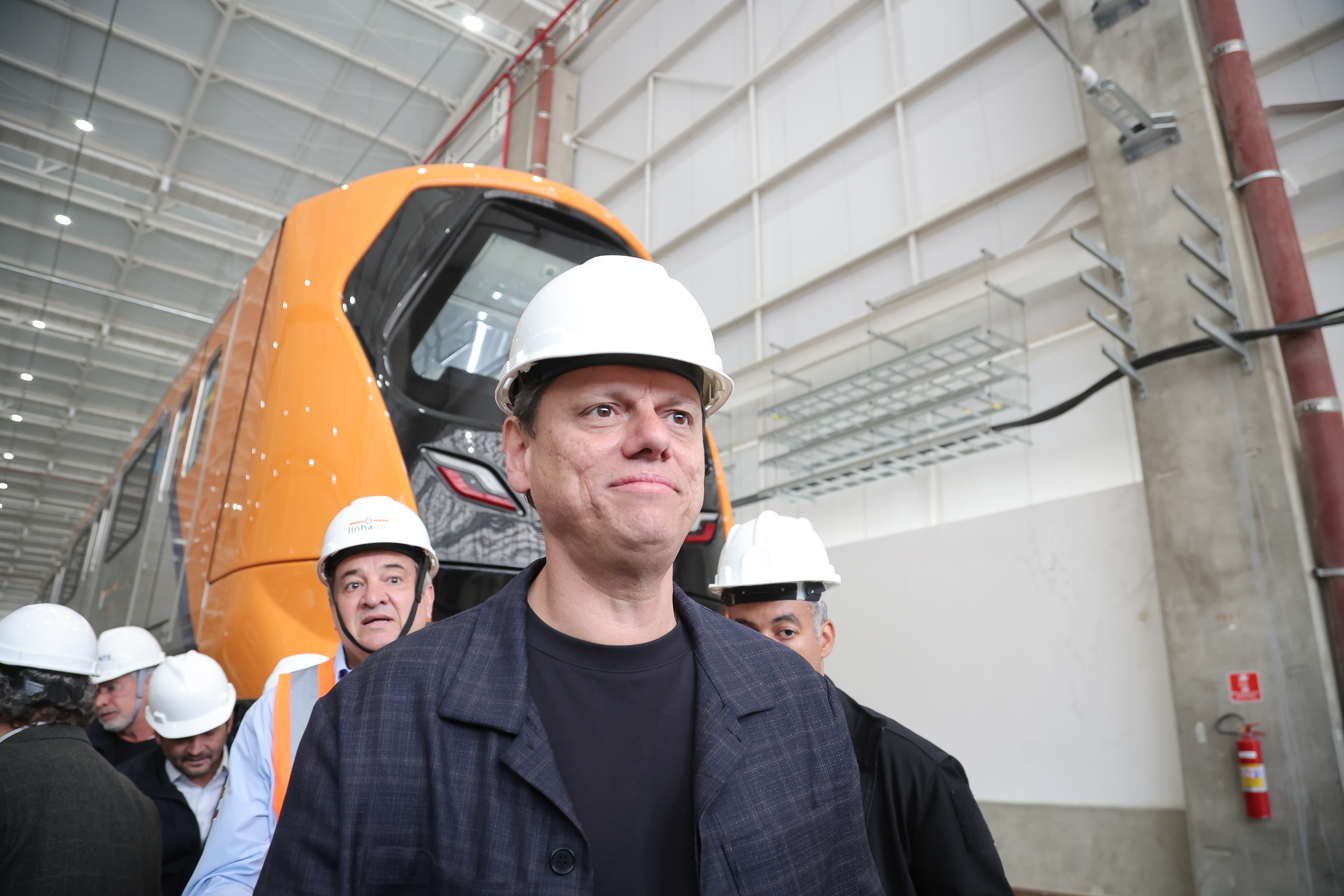
Freitas visiting the ongoing construction of the new Line 6 of the São Paulo Metro in July 2025.

===== Line 6 Metro =====
Construction of Line 6–Orange, a 15.3-kilometre underground line connecting Brasilândia in the city's north to São Joaquim station in the centre, the largest infrastructure project under development in Latin America, continued under the Freitas administration as an inherited PPP with Spanish concessionaire Acciona. By late 2025 the project had surpassed 77% completion, with tunnel excavation finished across all 15 stations. The first phase, between Brasilândia and Perdizes, is scheduled for delivery by end-2026; the Perdizes–São Joaquim section is to follow in 2027. The line is designed to carry approximately 630,000 passengers daily, reducing the end-to-end journey from around 90 minutes by bus to 23 minutes.

==== Public security and police accountability ====
Freitas appointed Guilherme Derrite as Public Security Secretary on taking office in January 2023. A former captain of the elite ROTA tactical unit of the São Paulo Military Police, Derrite was among the youngest and least senior officials to hold the post in the state's recent history; his predecessors had typically been prosecutors, generals or legal academics. He had been recommended for the role by federal deputy Eduardo Bolsonaro and had co-authored the public security chapter of Freitas's government programme. Derrite had previously been transferred out of ROTA's operational command on account of the high number of deaths in operations under his command.

In the first months of Derrite's tenure he replaced 34 of 63 colonels in military police command posts, including officers who had urged moderation during subsequent operations and had insisted that only camera-equipped officers participate in them. Derrite has since resigned the position to run for Senate in the 2026 elections.

===== Operação Escudo =====
On 27 July 2023 a ROTA officer, Patrick Bastos Reis, was killed in Guarujá, in the Baixada Santista coastal metropolitan area. The following day the state government launched Operação Escudo, deploying approximately 600 officers from across the state. The operation ran for 40 days before being formally closed on 5 September 2023, by which point 28 civilians had been killed in purported confrontations with police, making it one of the deadliest state police operations in São Paulo since the 1992 Carandiru massacre. A Human Rights Watch investigation based on 26 police reports, 15 forensic autopsy reports and interviews with community members found significant failures in the initial investigative steps, documenting cases in which officers gave statements collectively, crime scenes went unexamined by forensic personnel, and bodies arrived at autopsy without clothing. The Inter-American Commission on Human Rights condemned the killings in August 2023 and urged Brazil to investigate the full chain of command.

At the outset of the operation Freitas described police conduct as "extremely professional" and denied that any abuses had taken place; as the death toll grew he said those responsible for any "excesses" would be investigated. On 16 October 2023 he presented awards to officers who had participated in the operation. The São Paulo public prosecutor's office opened criminal investigations into all 28 deaths; by January 2025 it had archived 17 of the 22 completed investigations, prompting the state Public Defender's Office to seek their reopening.

===== Operação Verão =====
Following the killing of two officers in the Baixada Santista in late January and early February 2024, the state government intensified what had previously been a routine seasonal policing operation in the coastal region, rebranding it as a security operation targeting organised crime. Running from December 2023 to April 2024, Operação Verão resulted in 56 civilian deaths in purported confrontations with police. Combined with the 28 deaths of Operação Escudo, the 84 total fatalities across both operations were described in a collaborative report by Conectas Human Rights and the São Paulo Police Ombudsman's Office as the most lethal police operations in the state since the Carandiru massacre, with evidence of summary executions, torture and obstruction of justice. The São Paulo Police Ombudsman characterised the overall toll as "very negative," noting that those killed included people with disabilities, a blind person and a mother of six children.

At the press conference announcing the end of Operação Verão, Derrite stated he had been unaware of the death toll. In March 2024, when asked about complaints filed before the United Nations by Conectas and the Senate Commission led by Flávio Arns, Freitas told journalists: "People can go to the UN, they can go to the Justice League, wherever the hell they want to — I don't care."

===== Statewide lethality data =====
Military police killings across São Paulo state rose 60.2% in 2024 compared to 2023, with the Military Police responsible for 737 deaths — 640 by on-duty officers and 97 off-duty. This occurred simultaneously with a decline in overall intentional homicides: São Paulo state reached a 24-year low in its homicide rate in 2024, recording 5.9 intentional killings per 100,000 inhabitants. Police killings of people aged 10 to 19 increased by 120% between 2022 and 2024, with Black youths constituting 67% of victims.

===== Body cameras =====
Freitas had opposed the expansion of body cameras during his 2022 campaign, and under his administration the state issued a procurement contract for new devices, with the contract with Motorola providing only for officer-activated recording.

On 9 December 2024, STF President Luís Roberto Barroso issued an order requiring the São Paulo Military Police to use body cameras with uninterrupted recording, citing the constitutional prohibition of regression in rights protections. Days before the order, Freitas publicly acknowledged that he had been wrong to question the technology, stating: "I admit, I was wrong. I had a mistaken view of the importance of cameras."

In May 2025, Barroso homologated an agreement establishing national guidelines and a phased expansion in São Paulo, following technical consultations with the state and federal government.

==== Education policy ====
In an early dispute with the federal government, the Freitas administration announced São Paulo's withdrawal from the national textbook distribution programme (PNLD) in 2023, citing disagreements over content, before reversing course and rejoining the programme after the state's own procurement alternatives proved unviable.

The administration expanded the civic-military schools model, which places uniformed military personnel in administrative and disciplinary roles alongside civilian teachers. A federal court suspended the programme in August 2024 pending a public consultation; after the consultation period was extended, implementation resumed in August 2025. Supporters argued the model improved discipline and learning outcomes; critics, including teachers' unions and civil society organisations, contended it militarised the school environment and undermined pedagogical autonomy.

In November 2024 the São Paulo state legislature approved a constitutional amendment restructuring the allocation of education revenues, a measure that drew opposition from teachers' unions and prompted legal challenges over its compatibility with federal constitutional floor requirements for education spending.

==== Fiscal and tax policy ====
The administration negotiated a revision to the state's ICMS tax framework for the hospitality and events sector, agreeing a 4% rate that had been a longstanding demand of industry groups and which Freitas had resisted reducing during the 2022 campaign on fiscal sustainability grounds.

In November 2023 the state legislature approved a law granting amnesty for fines issued during the COVID-19 pandemic for violations of public health restrictions, including gathering limits and business closure orders. The law benefited a broad range of entities and individuals, among them former president Jair Bolsonaro, who had received fines for public events held in contravention of pandemic measures. The constitutionality of the amnesty was subsequently challenged before the STF by opposition parties, who argued it selectively absolved politically connected beneficiaries and undermined the legal basis of the public health response.

==== Health and social policy ====
In December 2023 Freitas signed a decree regulating the dispensing of cannabis-derived medicines through the state public health system, making São Paulo one of the first Brazilian states to establish a formal framework for their prescription and distribution to patients with qualifying conditions.

In February 2023, weeks into the new administration, a series of landslides struck the north coast of São Paulo state, killing more than 60 people and displacing thousands across the municipalities of São Sebastião, Ubatuba and Bertioga. The state government declared a state of emergency and mobilised the Civil House and the CDHU state housing company to coordinate emergency shelter and reconstruction.

Longer-term resettlement was incorporated into the Casa Paulista affordable housing programme, though civil society organisations and affected residents subsequently criticised the pace of permanent housing delivery and the adequacy of consultation with displaced communities over resettlement locations.

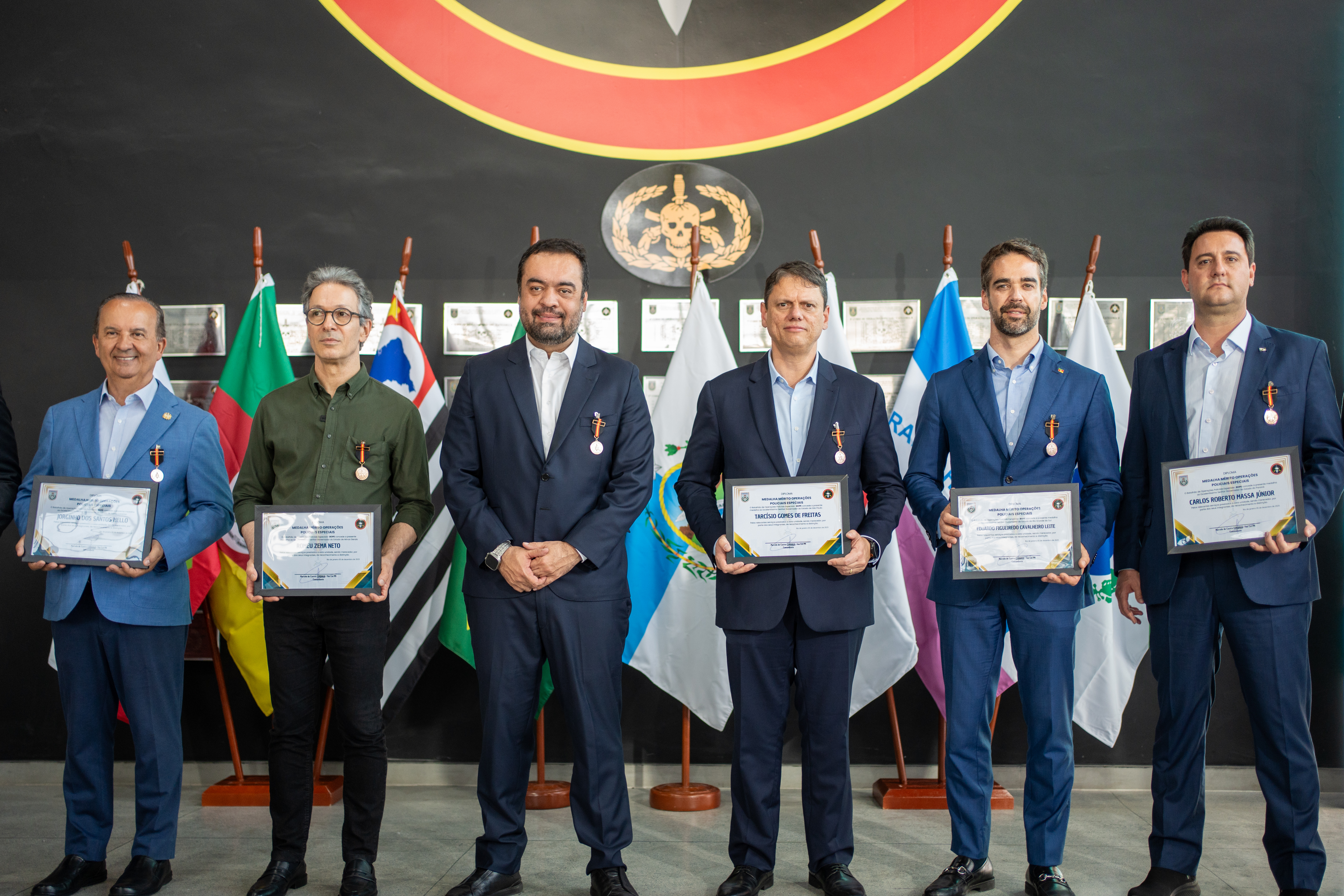
Visiting BOPE-RJ together with Jorginho Mello, Romeu Zema, Cláudio Castro, Eduardo Leite, and Ratinho Júnior

==== Media and cultural institutions ====
The Freitas administration maintained a tense relationship with the Fundação Padre Anchieta (operator of TV Cultura, Brazil's principal public broadcaster). Freitas expressed dissatisfaction with the station's editorial independence and what he characterised as operational inefficiency, and from early in his term the state withheld operating and maintenance funding, a measure the foundation's president described as unprecedented in the broadcaster's history. The 2025 budget proposal maintained the salary allocation of R$211 million but excluded operating costs; Freitas suggested the foundation seek private-sector and Lei Rouanet funding to compensate.

Tensions were compounded by the government's attempt to place an ideologically aligned figure on the foundation's 47-member Conselho Curador, which provoked threatened resignations among existing members. In April 2024 the government's deputy floor leader in the state assembly collected the signatures required to establish a parliamentary inquiry commission (CPI) into the foundation's management and a disputed council election; Freitas publicly opposed the CPI, and procedural queuing rules delayed its formation. Former FPA presidents and legal scholars argued the state bore a judicially enforceable obligation to maintain adequate funding for the institution.

=== 2024 municipal elections ===
==== Coalition strategy and intra-right dynamics ====
During the 2024 municipal cycle, Freitas consolidated a statewide center-right coalition anchored in his own Republicanos, Gilberto Kassab’s Social Democratic Party (PSD) and, where interests aligned, the Brazilian Democratic Movement (MDB). While prioritizing the expansion of Republicanos, Freitas utilized the PSD’s municipal machinery to act as an electoral surrogate for business-friendly, security-focused candidacies. He maintained a selective, policy-driven engagement with Jair Bolsonaro’s Liberal Party (PL), collaborating where interests aligned on security and infrastructure while diverging on tactical branding and candidate profiles. This arrangement occasionally exposed rifts, with the press framing several local races as proxy contests between Kassab’s and Bolsonaro’s respective political networks. To mitigate these disputes and avoid fracturing the broader right wing, Freitas frequently adopted neutral or low-profile stances during competitive runoffs.

==== City of São Paulo ====
In São Paulo, Freitas's primary electoral focus was securing the reelection of incumbent mayor Ricardo Nunes (MDB). Acting as Nunes's main electoral surrogate, Freitas framed the campaign around state–city cooperation while carefully calibrating Nunes's distance from former president Jair Bolsonaro. This strategy succeeded on October 27, 2024, when Nunes defeated federal deputy Guilherme Boulos (PSOL) in the runoff election.

Political analysts and the press widely credited Freitas's active campaigning as crucial to Nunes's victory, cementing the governor's own political influence in a highly competitive urban environment.

===== PCC scandal =====
The São Paulo mayoral runoff was overshadowed by a controversy on election day when Governor Freitas stated that state intelligence had intercepted communications from the Primeiro Comando da Capital (PCC) instructing its members to vote for Guilherme Boulos. Boulos immediately condemned the claim as a fabricated maneuver to manipulate the electorate and filed lawsuits demanding the nullification of Nunes's ticket for abuse of political power. In March 2025, the São Paulo Regional Electoral Court (TRE-SP) absolved Freitas and Nunes, ruling that the governor's remarks did not constitute an unlawful abuse of state apparatus or media.

==== Statewide results ====
Freitas's coalition achieved significant statewide victories, consolidating his political influence across diverse municipal landscapes. His party retained critical mayoralties through outright first-round wins by Dário Saadi in Campinas and Rodrigo Manga in Sorocaba, alongside a runoff victory by Rogério Santos in Santos. In races where the Republicanos organization faltered, Freitas demonstrated pragmatic flexibility; most notably in Guarulhos, where he pivoted to endorse Lucas Sanches (PL) following the Republicanos nominee's early elimination, contributing to Sanches's runoff victory. These results were bolstered by allied victories in major hubs like São José dos Campos, where Anderson Farias (PSD) successfully defeated his PL challenger in the second round.

==== Impact and aftermath ====
Following the 2024 municipal elections, political analysts observed a broader rightward shift among urban electorates, characterized by a preference for pragmatic conservatism over hardline bolsonarismo. This trend was evidenced by the substantial gains made by Republicanos and allied center-right parties in mayoral races statewide, contrasting with the underperformance of PL hardliners in several major urban centers. Analyses say Freitas' allied or endorsed candidates won 96% of races. Commentators widely interpreted these outcomes as a validation of Freitas’s strategic positioning; by successfully navigating the competing factions within his alliance, the election cycle consolidated his standing as a premier coalition broker and a leading figure for the Brazilian right.

== Political positions and persona ==
Commentators frequently describe Freitas as a technocratic, pro-market conservative who blends managerial pragmatism with ties to former president Jair Bolsonaro. Profiles in international and Brazilian media emphasize his engineering background, comfort with policy detail, and efforts to court business support while maintaining credibility with right-wing voters.

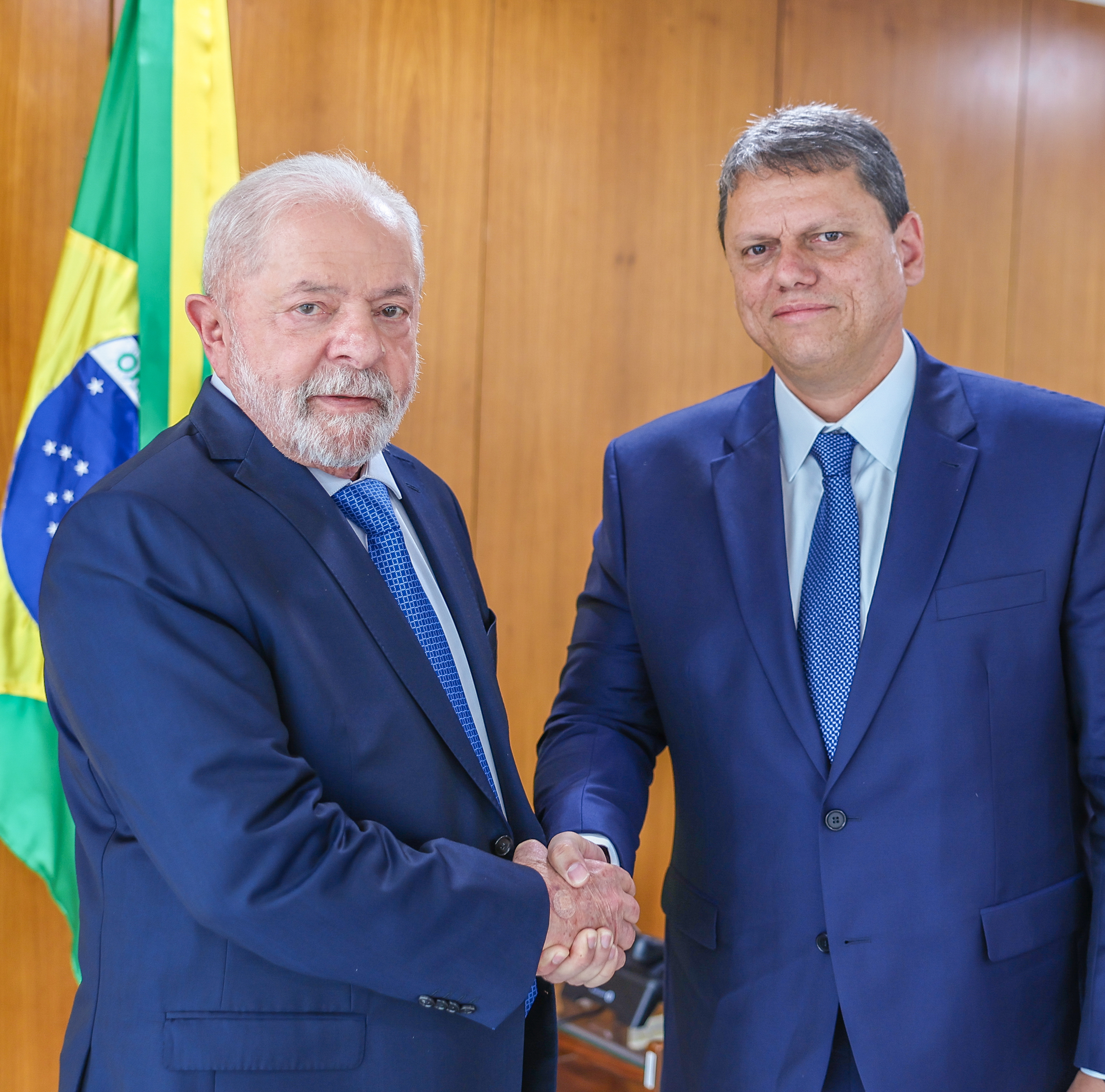
President Luiz Inácio Lula da Silva (left) and Freitas in the Palácio do Planalto in 2023.

=== Relationship with Lula and pragmatism ===
Although elected with Bolsonaro’s backing, Freitas has at times adopted conciliatory positions toward President Luiz Inácio Lula da Silva’s administration. In 2023 he publicly supported the federal tax-reform package championed by Lula’s economic team, a stance that drew criticism from Bolsonaro but was framed by Freitas as beneficial to São Paulo’s economy.

Freitas condemned the 8 January 2023 storming of federal buildings in Brasília as “unacceptable,” and later suggested that Congress debate amnesty for people convicted in connection with those events—positions reported by national media across the political spectrum.

=== Political positions ===
==== Economic policy and privatization ====
Freitas advocates concessions and privatizations to attract private capital and accelerate infrastructure delivery. As governor he oversaw the auction to complete and operate the Rodoanel Norte (North Beltway) and advanced railway and port concessions; reporting at the time highlighted his commitment to resuming stalled projects and broadening public-private partnerships. In July 2024 the state concluded the privatization of the water utility Sabesp through a secondary share offering that raised R$14.77 billion, with Equatorial Energia becoming a reference investor; the government announced tariff reductions for certain categories alongside a new investment program.

==== Education policy ====
In 2023 the administration initially withdrew the state network from the federal National Textbook Program (Programa Nacional do Livro e do Material Didático, PNLD), arguing for a shift to digital materials. After the Public Prosecutor’s Office and Public Defender sought an injunction, the government reversed course and rejoined the program. The São Paulo judiciary later suspended distribution of state-produced digital materials over errors, pending corrections.

Freitas also backed a statewide civic-military school model after the federal program was discontinued. The law establishing São Paulo’s program faced a preliminary suspension by the São Paulo Court of Justice in August 2024 and the government extended public consultation into 2025–26; in August 2025 a court authorized the state to hire reserve military police to staff the schools, allowing implementation to resume.

==== Health and drug policy ====
In December 2023 Freitas issued a decree regulating a state law that provides free distribution in the São Paulo public health system of cannabis-derived medicines for specified conditions, such as Dravet and Lennox–Gastaut syndromes and tuberous sclerosis. In January 2025, acting governor Felicio Ramuth vetoed a separate bill that would have authorized state production of cannabis-based medicines via the Fundação para o Remédio Popular, citing administrative and budgetary grounds; the veto was taken while Freitas was abroad and maintained by the government.

==== Public health enforcement during COVID-19 ====
Freitas proposed and sanctioned a state law in November 2023 granting amnesty for administrative fines issued for violating pandemic health measures, including mask mandates. The statute prompted legal challenges by political parties and review by the Federal Supreme Court (STF); the Attorney General of the Union later argued the law was unconstitutional.

=== Controversies ===
In January 2023, the governor faced criticism for appointments viewed as favoring relatives and allies. He revoked, within a day, the nomination of his wife’s brother-in-law (a concunhado) to a senior advisory post following public outcry and debate over anti-nepotism rules, while maintaining the appointment of Michelle Bolsonaro’s brother as a special adviser.

The 2023 amnesty for COVID-19 fines also drew sustained legal and political criticism. The STF requested information from the state and the Legislative Assembly after Direct Actions of Unconstitutionality were filed, and press outlets reported that the measure benefited high-profile figures including Bolsonaro by canceling fines; litigation over the law continued into 2024.

== Personal life ==
Freitas is married to Cristiane Freitas, with whom he has two children. He is a practicing Roman Catholic, a facet of his background noted in several biographical profiles.

== Electoral history ==
2022 São Paulo gubernatorial election
Party	Candidate for Governor	Party	Candidate for Vice	Round 1		Round 2	
Party	Candidate for Governor	Party	Candidate for Vice	Votes	%	Votes	%
Republicanos	Tarcísio de Freitas	PSD	Felicio Ramuth	9,881,995	42.32%	13,480,190	55.27%
PT	Fernando Haddad	PSB	Lúcia França	8,337,139	35.70%	10,908,972	44.73%
PSDB	Rodrigo Garcia (incumbent)	UNIÃO	Geninho Zuliani	4,296,293	18.40%	Eliminated	
NOVO	Vinicius Poit	NOVO	Doris Alves	388,974	1.67%	Eliminated	
PDT	Elvis Cezar	PDT	Gleides Sodré	281,712	1.21%	Eliminated	
UP	Carol Vigliar	UP	Eloiza Alves	88,767	0.38%	Eliminated	
PCB	Gabriel Colombo	PCB	Aline Miglioli	46,727	0.20%	Eliminated	
PSTU	Altino Prazeres	PSTU	Flávia Bischain	14,859	0.06%	Eliminated	
DC	Antonio Jorge	DC	Vitor Rocca	10,778	0.05%	Eliminated	
PCO	Edson Dorta	PCO	Lilian Miranda	5,305	0.02%	Eliminated	
Total votes				23,352,549	100.00%	24,389,162	100.00%
Invalid and blank votes				3,795,298	13.98%	2,951,685	10.79%
Republicanos gain from PSDB							

== Notes ==
Political offices
Preceded by Valter Casimiro as Minister of Transport	Minister of Infrastructure; 2019–2022	Succeeded by Marcelo Sampaio
Preceded by Rodrigo Garcia	Governor of São Paulo; 2023–present	Incumbent
