= Ministry of Infrastructure (Brazil) =

Ministry overview
- Formed: 17 December 1892; 1 January 2019 (re-creation)
- Dissolved: 1 January 2023
- Jurisdiction: Federal government of Brazil
- Headquarters: Brasília, Distrito Federal
- Annual budget: R$ 19,0 billion (2022)
- Minister responsible: Marcelo Sampaio
- Website: https://www.gov.br/infraestrutura/pt-br

The Ministry of Infrastructure (MInfra) (Portuguese: Ministério da Infraestrutura) was a cabinet-level federal ministry in Brazil. It was a body of the direct administration of the Brazilian state, responsible for national traffic and transport policies (air, rail, road and waterway, in addition to airport and port infrastructure). The body succeeded the Ministry of Transport, having received the new designation and the attributions related to traffic with the election of Jair Bolsonaro to the Presidency of Republic. These were the responsibility of the extinct Ministry of Cities until then. The regimental structure of the ministry is established by Decree 9.676/19.

Previously, during the Fernando Collor de Mello's government, there was also a Ministry of Infrastructure, created by Law 8028/90 of April 12, 1990. However, at the time, the agency also had powers related to mines, energy and communications, a fact which is currently not repeated. The holders of this ministry were Ozires Silva, Eduardo de Freitas Teixeira and João Eduardo Cerdeira de Santana. At the time, the ministry was extinguished by Law 8.422/92 of May 13, 1992.

On January 1, 2019, the Ministry of Transport, Ports and Civil Aviation was merged into the Ministry of Infrastructure by President Jair Bolsonaro. The first holder after the re-creation of the ministry was Tarcísio Gomes de Freitas.

The body was dissolved on January 1, 2023 by president Luiz Inácio Lula da Silva and was divided into two new ministries: the Ministry of Transport and Ministry of Ports and Airports.

== Chronology ==
The ministry has had several denominations:

- 1860 to 1892 — Secretary of State for Agriculture, Commerce and Public Works
- 1892 to 1906 — Ministry of Industry, Transport and Public Works
- 1906 to 1967 — Ministry of Transport and Public Works
- 1967 to 1990 — Ministry of Transport
- 1990 to 1992 — Ministry of Infrastructure
- April 10, 1992 to November 19, 1992 — Ministry of Transport and Communications
- November 19, 1992 to May 12, 2016 — Ministry of Transport
- May 12, 2016 to December 31, 2018 — Ministry of Transport, Ports and Civil Aviation
- January 1, 2019 to December 31, 2022 — Ministry of Infrastructure
- since 1 January 2023 — succeeded by the Ministry of Transport and the Ministry of Ports and Airports.

== History of the Ministry ==
In 1860, during the Imperial Regime, the Secretary of State for Agriculture, Commerce and Public Works was created, as a result of the dismemberment of the postal services, telegraphs, roads and public works.

After the Republic of Brazil was proclaimed in 1889, the administration of the country was restructured, and in December 1892 the Ministry of Industry, Transport and Public Works was created, to which the attributions of the Secretary of Agriculture passed, extinct in November 1892.

In December 1906, the Ministry received new attributions and the name of the Ministry was changed Ministry of Transport and Public Works.

In the 1960s, the administrative reform brought about profound changes in the structure of the Ministry, which was already transformed into the Ministry of Transport, with areas of competence in rail transport, highways, waterborne transport, merchant navy, ports and waterways, and participation in the coordination of air transport.

In March 1990, the Ministry of Transport, the Ministry of Mines and Energy and the Ministry of Communications were merged, and the Ministry of Infrastructure was created, with competence also in the areas of geology, mineral and energy resources, hydrological regime and sources of hydraulic energy, mining and metallurgy, oil industry and electric energy, including nuclear energy, inspection using radio frequency and postal services.

In May 1992, the Ministry of Infrastructure was abolished and the Ministry of Transport and Communications was created, with powers in the areas of transport, telecommunications and postal services.

In November 1992, the current Ministry of Transport was created, with specific attributions in national transport policy. On May 12, 2016, the federal government, through Provisional Measure No. 726, extinguished the Civil Aviation and Ports Secretariats, merging them with the Ministry of Transport. Previously linked to the Presidency of the Republic, the attributions and powers of the secretariats became part of the Ministry of Transport, Ports and Civil Aviation.

The first to take office as the new minister of Transport, Ports and Civil Aviation was the federal deputy from Alagoas (on that period), Maurício Quintella Lessa. On April 2, 2018, he left the ministry to run in the 2018 Brazilian general election and was succeeded by the Director General of National Department of Transport Infrastructure (DNIT), Valter Casimiro.

On January 1, 2019, the Ministry of Transport, Ports and Civil Aviation changed its name back again to the Ministry of Infrastructure. On January 1, 2023 it was dissolved and divided into two ministries, the Ministry of Transport (headed by Renan Filho) and the Ministry of Ports and Airports (headed by Márcio França).

== List of ministers of Infrastructure of Brazil ==
| No. | Portrait | Minister | Took office | Left office | Time in office | Party | President |
|---|---|---|---|---|---|---|---|
| 1 | Ozires Silva | Ozires Silva (born 1931) | 15 March 1990 | 27 March 1991 | 1 year, 12 days | Independent | Fernando Collor (PRN) |
| 2 | Eduardo de Freitas Teixeira | Eduardo de Freitas Teixeira (born 1954) | 27 March 1991 | 9 May 1991 | 43 days | Independent | Fernando Collor (PRN) |
| 3 | João Cerdeira de Santana | João Cerdeira de Santana (born 1957) | 9 May 1991 | 13 April 1992 | 340 days | Independent | Fernando Collor (PRN) |
| 4 | Tarcísio de Freitas | Tarcísio de Freitas (born 1975) | 1 January 2019 | 30 March 2022 | 3 years, 88 days | Independent | Jair Bolsonaro (PSL) |
| 5 | Marcelo Sampaio | Marcelo Sampaio (born 1985) | 30 March 2022 | 1 January 2023 | 277 days | Independent | Jair Bolsonaro (PL) |
