= Felipe Salto =

Brazilian economist (born 1987)

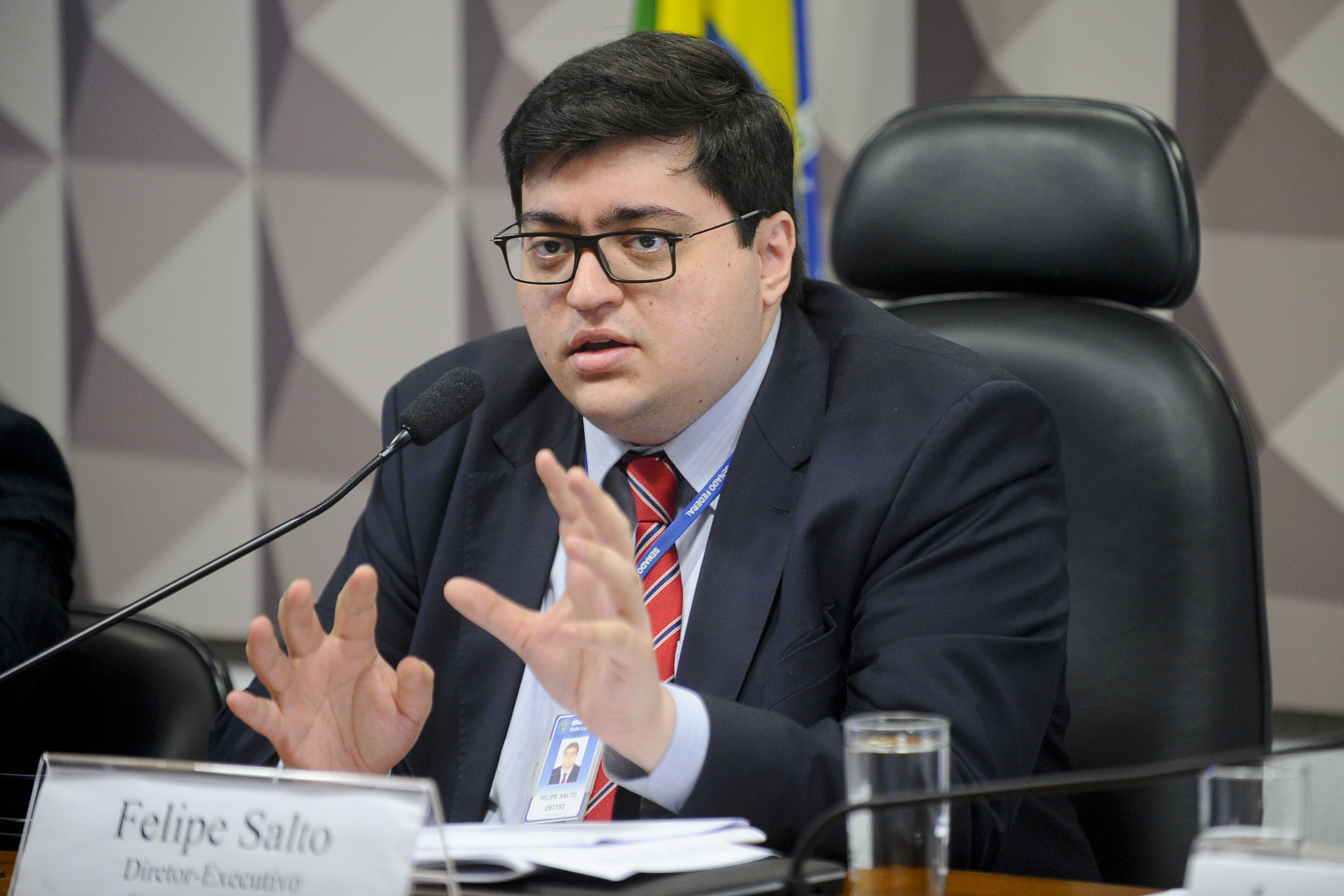
- Salto in 2017

Secretary of Finance and Planning of São Paulo
- In office 19 April 2022 – 1 January 2023
- Governor: Rodrigo Garcia
- Preceded by: Henrique Meirelles
- Succeeded by: Samuel Yoshiaki Oliveira Kinoshita

Personal details
- Born: Felipe Scudeler Salto; 11 February 1987 (age 39) São Paulo, São Paulo, Brazil
- Education: Fundação Getulio Vargas (B.Ec, MPA)
- Profession: Economist

Felipe Scudeler Salto (born February 11, 1987) is a Brazilian economist, professor, and economic consultant. Salto served as Secretary of Finance and Planning of the state of São Paulo in 2022. Previously, he was an advisor on economic and fiscal affairs to senator José Serra from 2015 to 2016. He later served, from 2016 to 2022, as the first executive director of the Independent Fiscal Institution (IFI), a body linked to the Federal Senate responsible for monitoring and analyzing the country's public accounts. His book Finanças Públicas (Public Finances) won the Jabuti Prize in the economics category. Since 2023, he has been chief economist at Warren Investimentos.
