= Caio França =

Brazilian politician (born 1988)

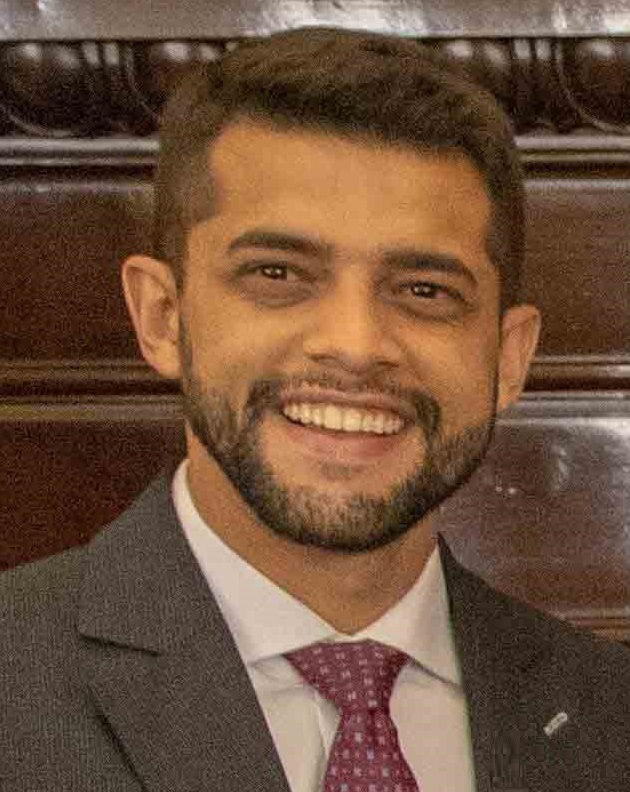
- França in 2018

Member of the Legislative Assembly of São Paulo
- Incumbent
- Assumed office 15 March 2015
- Constituency: At-large

Member of the Municipal Chamber of São Vicente
- In office 1 January 1989 – 1 January 1997
- Constituency: At-large

Personal details
- Born: 1 August 1988 (age 38)
- Party: PSB (2007–present)
- Spouse: Fernanda Noronha
- Parents: Márcio França (father); Lúcia França (mother)
- Education: Catholic University of Santos

Caio França de Gouvêa Gomes (born 1 August 1988) is a Brazilian politician serving as a member of the Legislative Assembly of São Paulo since 2015. He is the son of Márcio França and Lúcia França.
