= Carlinhos Almeida =

Brazilian politician

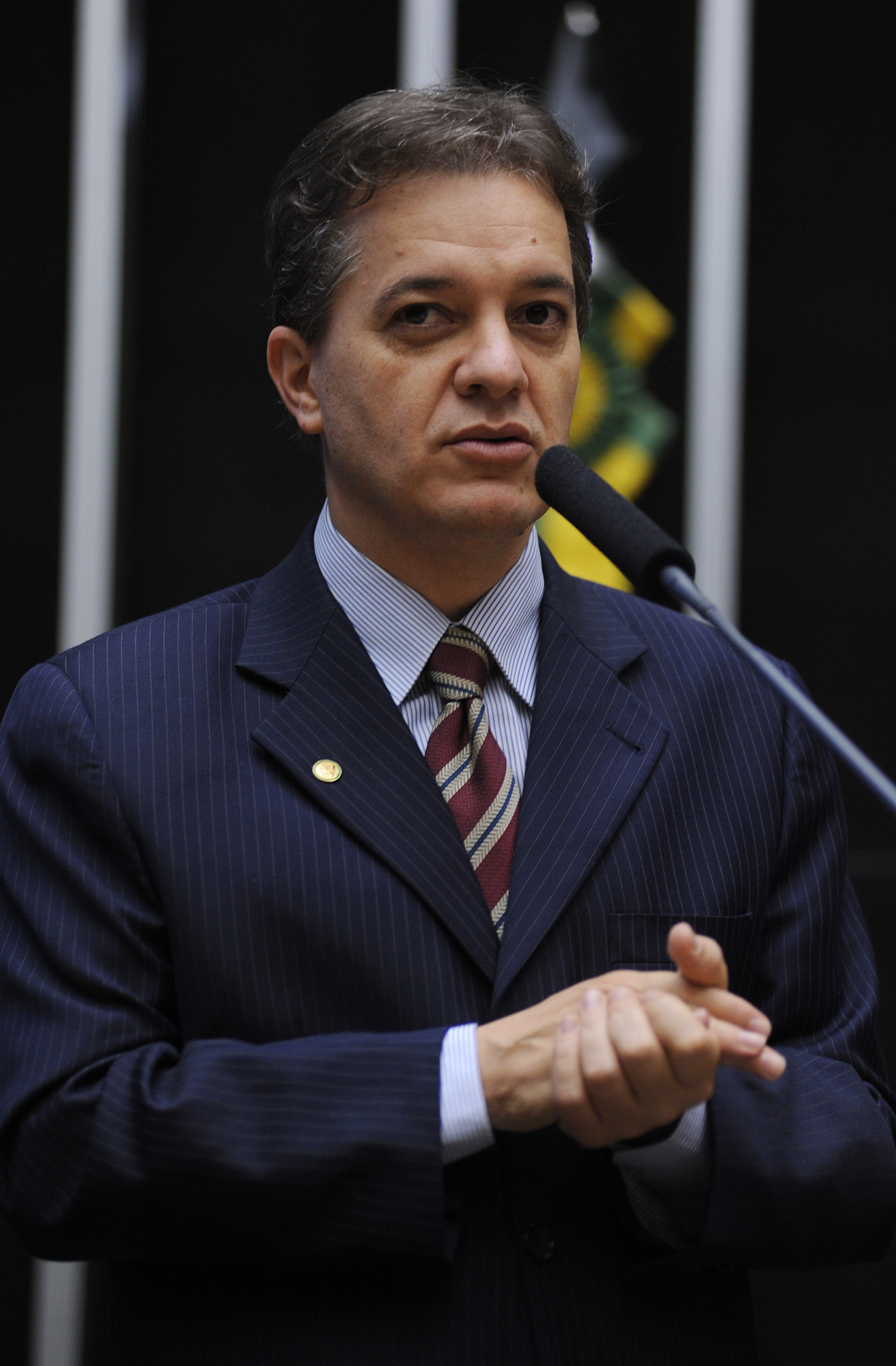

Mayor of São José dos Campos
- In office January 1, 2013 – December 31, 2016
- Preceded by: Eduardo Cury
- Succeeded by: Felicio Ramuth

Personal details
- Born: Carlos Jose de Almeida; June 25, 1963 (age 63) Santa Rita de Jacutinga, Minas Gerais, Brazil

Carlos José de Almeida (born June 25, 1963), better known as Carlinhos Almeida, is a Brazilian academic and politician. A member of the Workers' Party (PT), Almeida served as Mayor of São José dos Campos in the state of São Paulo from 2013 to 2016.

== Early life and education ==
Almeida was born on June 25, 1963, in Santa Rita de Jacutinga, Minas Gerais. According to O Globo, Almeida received a degree in history.

== Career ==
Almeida was elected a city councilor in 1992. In 1998, he was elected to the Legislative Assembly of São Paulo. In 2010, he was elected to the federal Chamber of Deputies.

In the 2012 municipal election, Almeida was elected Mayor of São José dos Campos with 50.99% of the vote, with Brazilian Social Democracy Party (PSDB) opponent Alexandre Blanco receiving 43.15% of the vote. In 2016, Almeida was defeated for reelection by PSDB opponent Felicio Ramuth. Ramuth received 62% of the vote to Almeida's 21%.

Following his defeat for reelection, Almeida would become chief of staff to state deputy Emídio de Souza in 2019.
