= Marcelo Sampaio =

Brazilian politician (born 1985)

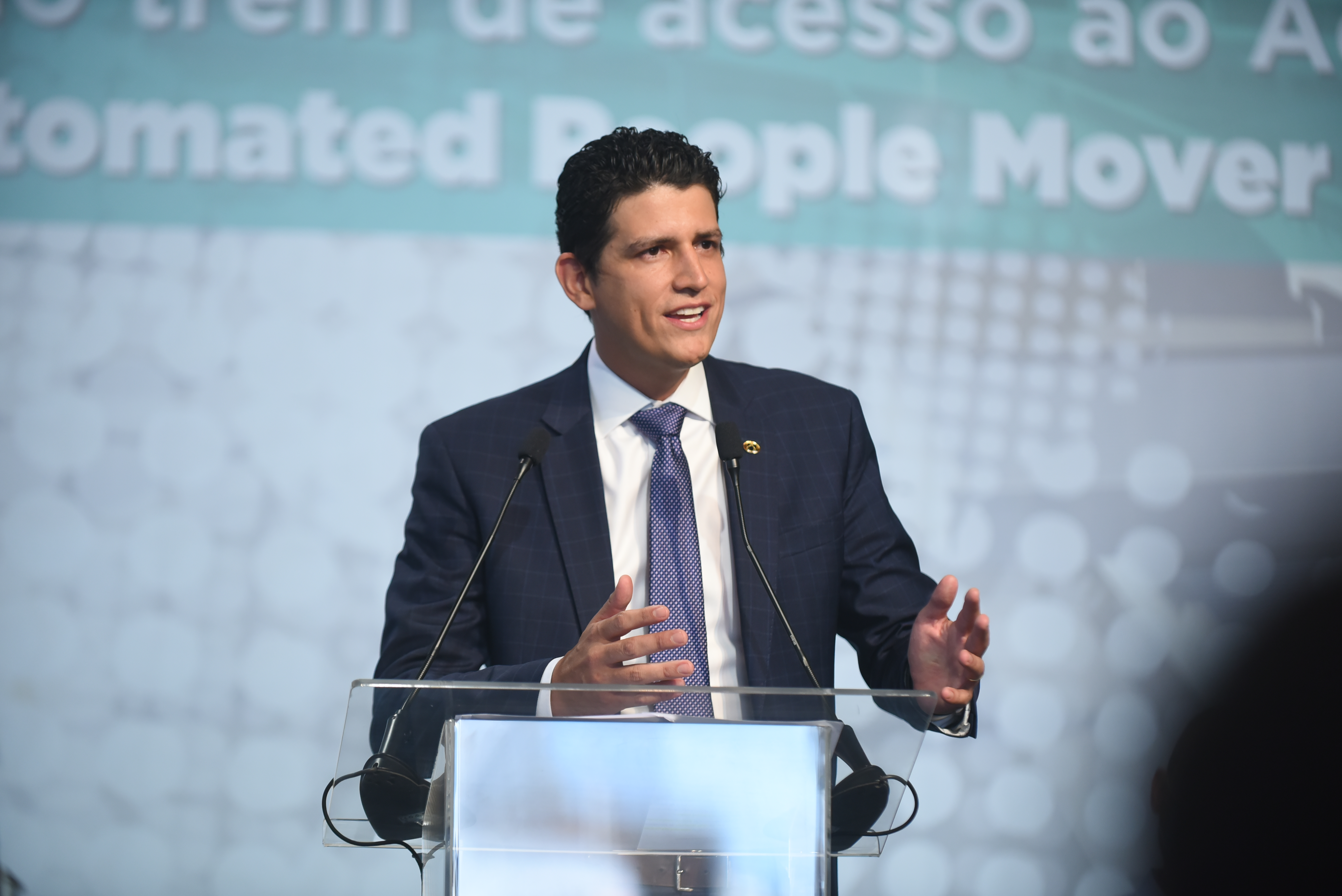
- Sampaio in 2021

Minister of Infrastructure
- In office 30 March 2022 – 31 December 2022
- President: Jair Bolsonaro
- Preceded by: Tarcísio de Freitas
- Succeeded by: Renan Filho (as minister of transport); Márcio França (as minister of ports and airports)

Personal details
- Born: 1 December 1985 (age 40)
- Party: Independent

Marcelo Sampaio Cunha Filho (born 1 December 1985). From March to December 2022, he served as minister of infrastructure. From 2019 to 2022, he served as executive secretary of the Ministry of Infrastructure.
