= Felicio Ramuth =

Brazilian politician (born 1968)

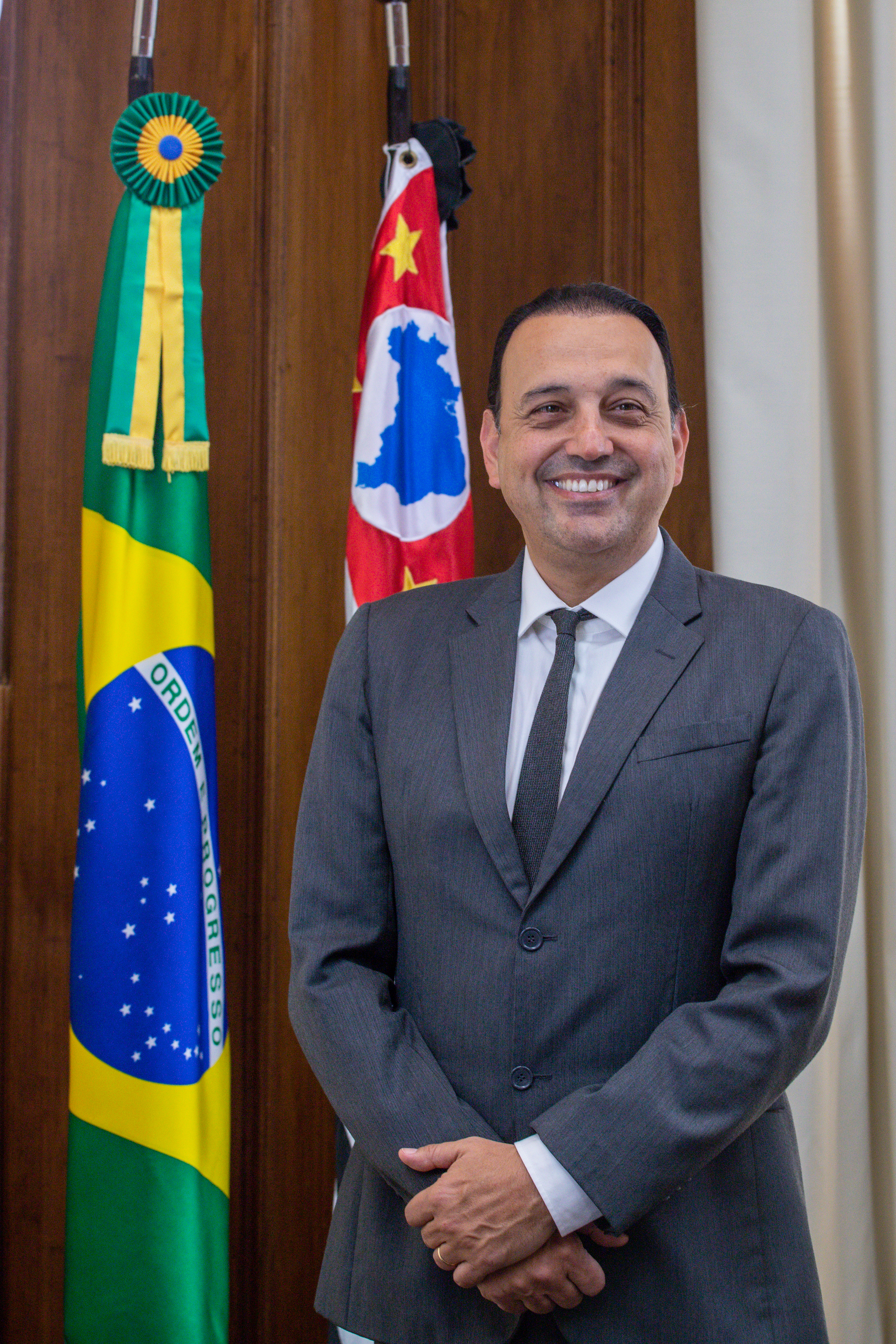
- Official portrait, 2023

Lieutenant Governor of São Paulo
- Incumbent
- Assumed office 1 January 2023
- Governor: Tarcísio de Freitas
- Preceded by: Rodrigo Garcia

Mayor of São José dos Campos
- In office 1 January 2017 – 1 April 2022
- Deputy: Ricardo Nakagawa; Anderson Farias
- Preceded by: Carlinhos Almeida
- Succeeded by: Anderson Farias

Personal details
- Born: 11 November 1968 (age 57) São Paulo, Brazil
- Party: MDB (2026–present)
- Other political affiliations: PSDB (1993–2022); PSD (2022–2026)

Felicio Ramuth (born 11 November 1968) is a Brazilian politician who has served as Lieutenant Governor of São Paulo under Governor Tarcísio de Freitas since 2023. Elected in the 2022 gubernatorial election, Ramuth previously served as Mayor of São José dos Campos from 2017 to 2022. Ramuth was a member of the Brazilian Social Democracy Party (PSDB) until 2022, when he joined the Social Democratic Party (PSD).

== Early life and education ==
Ramuth was born 11 November 1968 in the city of São Paulo to a Jewish family. Ramuth received an education in business administration, graduating with an MBA in Public Management from Fundação Getulio Vargas.

== Mayor of São José dos Campos ==
From January 2017 to March 2022, he served as mayor of São José dos Campos, the fifth most populous city in the state São Paulo. He was first elected mayor in the 2016 municipal election with 62% of the vote, and was reelected in 2020 with 58.21% of the vote. Prior to serving as mayor, he served as secretary of transport and as communication planning advisor for mayor Eduardo Cury.

Felicio's management pointed to debts of more than R$ 300 million, inherited from the previous management.

Felício promoted the regulation of Shared Resource Providers (Provedores de Recursos Compartilhados), which encompasses, for example, individual passenger transport applications. In May 2017, it struck a deal with Uber.

=== Commissioned Positions ===
In January 2020, the Public Prosecutor's Office of São Paulo asked the Chamber and the City of São José dismiss all commissioned servants (positions distributed directly by members of the executive and legislative branches). According to a report by G1, according to the Public Prosecutor's Office, the positions were irregularly distributed, some without the requirement of higher education and technical activity

In the decision, Judge Silvio José Pinheiro dos Santos alleges that there are insufficient grounds to indicate that the exonerations should be carried out. He also says that of 43 positions listed in the lawsuit, at least 23 were the target of a direct action of unconstitutionality and extinguished by a 2018 law.

=== The BRT's ===
The Court of Auditors of the State of São Paulo made notes in a tender held by the administration of Felício Ramuth for the purchase of BRT's for the transport of passengers named "Green Line" in the city of São José dos Campos. The Court determined the cancellation of the auction that had been opened by the Felicio Ramuth (PSDB) government for the purchase of 12 BRT's.

== Vice Governor of São Paulo ==
Ramuth left the Brazilian Social Democracy Party (PSDB) in 2022. Felício Ramuth had initially planned to run for Governor of São Paulo in the 2022 gubernatorial election as the nominee of the PSD. However, he ultimately ran for Vice Governor on a successful ticket headed by Tarcísio de Freitas of the Republicanos.

=== Controversies ===
==== Attacks on Tarcísio de Freitas and Jair Bolsonaro' ====
During his Pre-Campaign for the State Government in 2022, Felício Ramuth attacked the then Pre-Candidate: Tarcísio de Freitas (at the time, affiliated with the Republicans), in the same electoral contest, Felício would later be announced as the vice-governor of the one who attacked him

Published on YouTube, during the interview with the channel O Vale, Felício attacked Tarcísio by comparing his electoral shift from Rio de Janeiro to São Paulo for the election, stating that his domicile is not genuine, likening it to the electoral shift of former President and Senator José Sarney to Amapá.

"I believe that he [Tarcísio] is already starting off on the wrong foot by declaring a false electoral address Do you remember when Sarney changed his title to run for Senator in Amapá? It's a terrible example So, it reminds me a bit of that strategy I don't agree; I think [Tarcísio] is already starting off poorly If he had lived here longer and had a stronger connection" Ramuth expressed

"If the population wants to see here the same extreme government that we are seeing at the federal level, they will choose Bolsonaro's candidate" says the former mayor of São José dos Campos, in a critical tone towards the Jair Bolsonaro government

I"n the last election, I made my choice for Geraldo Alckmin in the first round And later, I made my decision between Haddad and Bolsonaro, choosing Bolsonaro I regretted it, but I made my choice", says, indicating that they would have preferred a third candidate in the presidential campaign and regretted their vote for Bolsonaro

In the same campaign, Felício ignored what he had previously said and campaigned for Jair Bolsonaro, receiving boos during the campaign when he received Jair in São José dos Campos.

== Personal life ==
Ramuth is Jewish.

=== Bidding in Praia Grande ===
Felício was the target of investigations by the Public Prosecutor's Office of the State of São Paulo, where the Public Prosecutor's Office accused him of administrative impropriety and illegality in the holding of bids.

In June 2017 he was investigated by one of his companies, Direct, having suspicious participation in a bid in the amount of R$ 176.5 thousand by the Municipality of Praia Grande, The MPSP alleged, in summary, that the defendants would have caused damage to the public coffers by hiring a company for electronic control of the construction waste management system and bulky waste, with migration of the data currently existing in the online service in use, in the municipality of Praia Grande.

The initial part of the process was received. However, after an appeal was filed, in 2019 the court determined, in the second instance, the annulment of the decision to receive the initial one. Thus, according to the sentence, "all procedural acts practiced from the receipt of the initial were impaired"

Political offices
| Preceded by Carlinhos Almeida | Mayor of São José dos Campos; 2017–2022 | Succeeded by Anderson Farias |
| Vacant Title last held by Rodrigo Garcia | Vice Governor of São Paulo; 2023–present | Incumbent |
Lines of succession
| First | São Paulo gubernatorial line of succession 1st in line as Vice Governor of São Paulo | Followed by André do Prado as President of the Legislative Assembly |
