= Márcio França =

Brazilian lawyer and politician (born 1963)

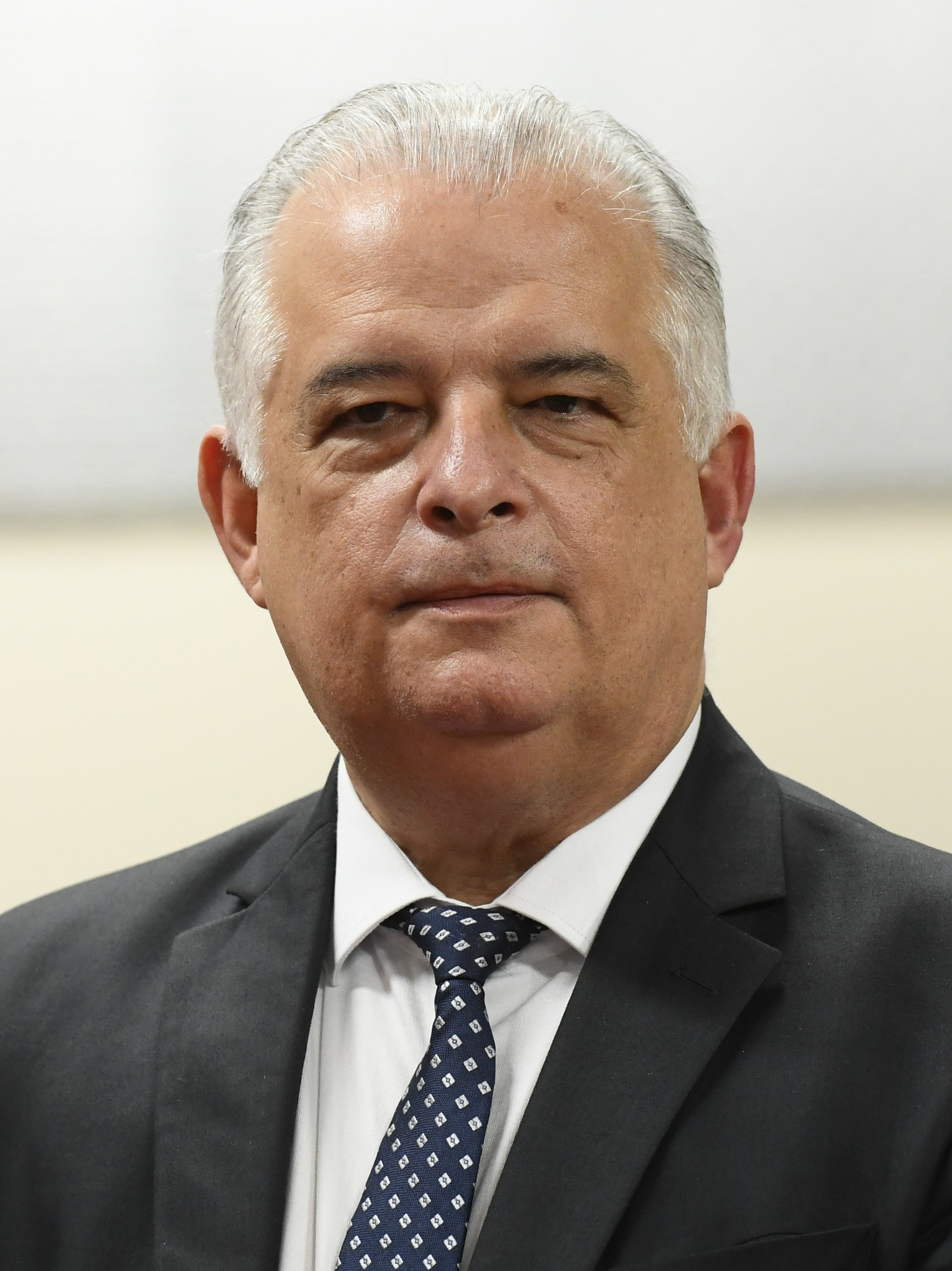
- França in 2023

Minister of Entrepreneurship, Microenterprise and Small Business
- In office 13 September 2023 – 2 April 2026
- President: Luiz Inácio Lula da Silva
- Preceded by: Office established
- Succeeded by: Tadeu Alencar

Minister of Ports and Airports
- In office 1 January 2023 – 13 September 2023
- President: Luiz Inácio Lula da Silva
- Preceded by: Marcelo Sampaio
- Succeeded by: Sílvio Costa Filho

Governor of São Paulo
- In office 6 April 2018 – 1 January 2019
- Lieutenant: Vacant
- Preceded by: Geraldo Alckmin
- Succeeded by: João Doria
Other offices
Lieutenant Governor of Sāo Paulo
In office 1 January 2015 – 6 April 2018
Governor	Geraldo Alckmin
Preceded by	Afif Domingos
Succeeded by	Rodrigo Garcia
Member of the Chamber of Deputies
In office 1 February 2007 – 1 January 2015
Constituency	São Paulo
Mayor of São Vicente
In office 1 January 1997 – 1 January 2005
Deputy	Paulo Souza
Preceded by	Luís Carlos Luca Pedro
Succeeded by	Tércio Garcia
Councillor of São Vicente
In office 1 January 1989 – 1 January 1997
Constituency	At-large

Personal details
- Born: Márcio Luiz França Gomes; 23 June 1963 (age 63) São Vicente, São Paulo, Brazil
- Party: PSB (1988–present)
- Spouse: Lúcia Gouvêa (m. 1986)
- Children: 2, including Caio
- Education: Catholic University of Santos (LL.B.)

Márcio Luiz França Gomes (born 23 June 1963) is a Brazilian lawyer and politician, member of the Brazilian Socialist Party (PSB), and former governor and vice governor of São Paulo, elected with Geraldo Alckmin in 2014. França assumed the office as governor on 6 April 2018 after Alckmin resigned to run for President of Brazil in the 2018 election. França ran for re-election in 2018, but lost to João Doria by a narrow margin in the run-off.

He was the PSB nominee for Mayor of São Paulo with Antonio Neto, from PDT, as vice mayoral running mate. In the 2022 elections, França was a candidate for the Senate, while his wife Lúcia França became the running mate of Fernando Haddad in the São Paulo gubernatorial election.

== Electoral history ==
Year	Election	Party	Office	Coalition	Partners	Party	Votes	Percent	Result
1988	Municipal Election of São Vicente	PSB	Councillor	—N/a			472	—N/a	Elected
1992	Municipal Election of São Vicente	PSB	Councillor	—N/a			1,082	—N/a	Elected
1994	State Election of São Paulo	PSB	Federal Deputy	Popular Brazil Front SP (PT, PSB, PPS, PCdoB, PCB, PMN, PSTU)	—N/a		18,410	—N/a	Surrogate
1996	Municipal Election of São Vicente	PSB	Mayor	—N/a			50,371	44.34%	Elected
2000	Municipal Election of São Vicente	PSB	Mayor	(PSB, PSDB, PFL, PDT, PAN, PTN, PV, PPS, PTB, PCdoB, PSDC, PSC, PMDB, PTdoB, PRP, PPB)	—N/a		139,581	93.01%	Elected
2006	State Election of São Paulo	PSB	Federal Deputy	—N/a			215,388	1.04%	Elected
2010	State Election of São Paulo	PSB	Federal Deputy	Pay Attention São Paulo (PSL, PSB)	—N/a		171,973	0.92%	Elected
2014	State Election of São Paulo	PSB	Vice Governor	This is São Paulo (PSDB, DEM, PEN, PMN, PTdoB, PTC, PTN, SD, PPS, PRB, PSB, PSC, PSDC, PSL)	Geraldo Alckmin	PSDB	12,230,807	57.31%	Elected
2018	State Election of São Paulo	PSB	Governor	São Paulo Trusts and Advances (PSB, PSC, PPS, PTB, PV, PR, PODE, PMB, PHS, PPL, PRP, PATRIOTA, PROS, SOLIDARIEDADE, AVANTE)	Eliane Nikoluk	PR	4,358,998	21.53%	Runoff
2018	State Election of São Paulo	PSB	Governor	São Paulo Trusts and Advances (PSB, PSC, PPS, PTB, PV, PR, PODE, PMB, PHS, PPL, PRP, PATRIOTA, PROS, SOLIDARIEDADE, AVANTE)	Eliane Nikoluk	PR	10,248,740	48.25%	Not elected
2020	Municipal Election of São Paulo	PSB	Mayor	Here We Have Word (PSB, PDT, PMN, Avante, Solidariedade)	Antonio Neto	PDT	728,441	13.64%	Not elected
2022	State Election of São Paulo	PSB	Senator	Together for São Paulo (PT, PCdoB, PV, PSOL, REDE, PSB, Agir)	Juliano Medeiros	PSOL	7,822,518	36.27%	Not elected
2022	State Election of São Paulo	PSB	Senator	Together for São Paulo (PT, PCdoB, PV, PSOL, REDE, PSB, Agir)	Dora Fehr	PSB	7,822,518	36.27%	Not elected
2026	State Election of São Paulo	PSB	Vice Governor	Wake Up São Paulo (PT, PCdoB, PV, PSOL, REDE, PSB, PDT)	Fernando Haddad	PT	—N/a	—N/a	TBA

Political offices
Preceded by Luís Carlos Luca Pedro	Mayor of São Vicente; 1997–2005	Succeeded by Tércio Garcia
Preceded by José Benedito Pereira Fernandes	Secretary of Sports, Recreation and Tourism of São Paulo; 2011–2015	Succeeded by Roberto Alves de Lucena
Preceded by Guilherme Afif Domingos	Vice Governor of São Paulo; 2015–2018	Vacant Title next held by Rodrigo Garcia
Preceded by Nelson Baeta Neves Filho	Secretary of Development of São Paulo; 2015–2018	Succeeded by Marcos Monteiro
Preceded by Geraldo Alckmin	Governor of São Paulo; 2018–2019	Succeeded by João Doria
Preceded by Marcelo Sampaio as Minister of Infrastructure	Minister of Ports and Airports; 2023	Succeeded by Sílvio Costa Filho
Office created	Minister of Entrepreneurship, Microenterprise and Small Business; 2023–present	Incumbent
Party political offices
Preceded by Paulo Skaf (2010)	PSB nominee for Governor of São Paulo; 2018	Most recent
Preceded by Luiza Erundina (2004)	PSB nominee for Mayor of São Paulo; 2020	Succeeded by Tabata Amaral
