= Rodrigo Garcia (politician) =

Brazilian politician (born 1974)

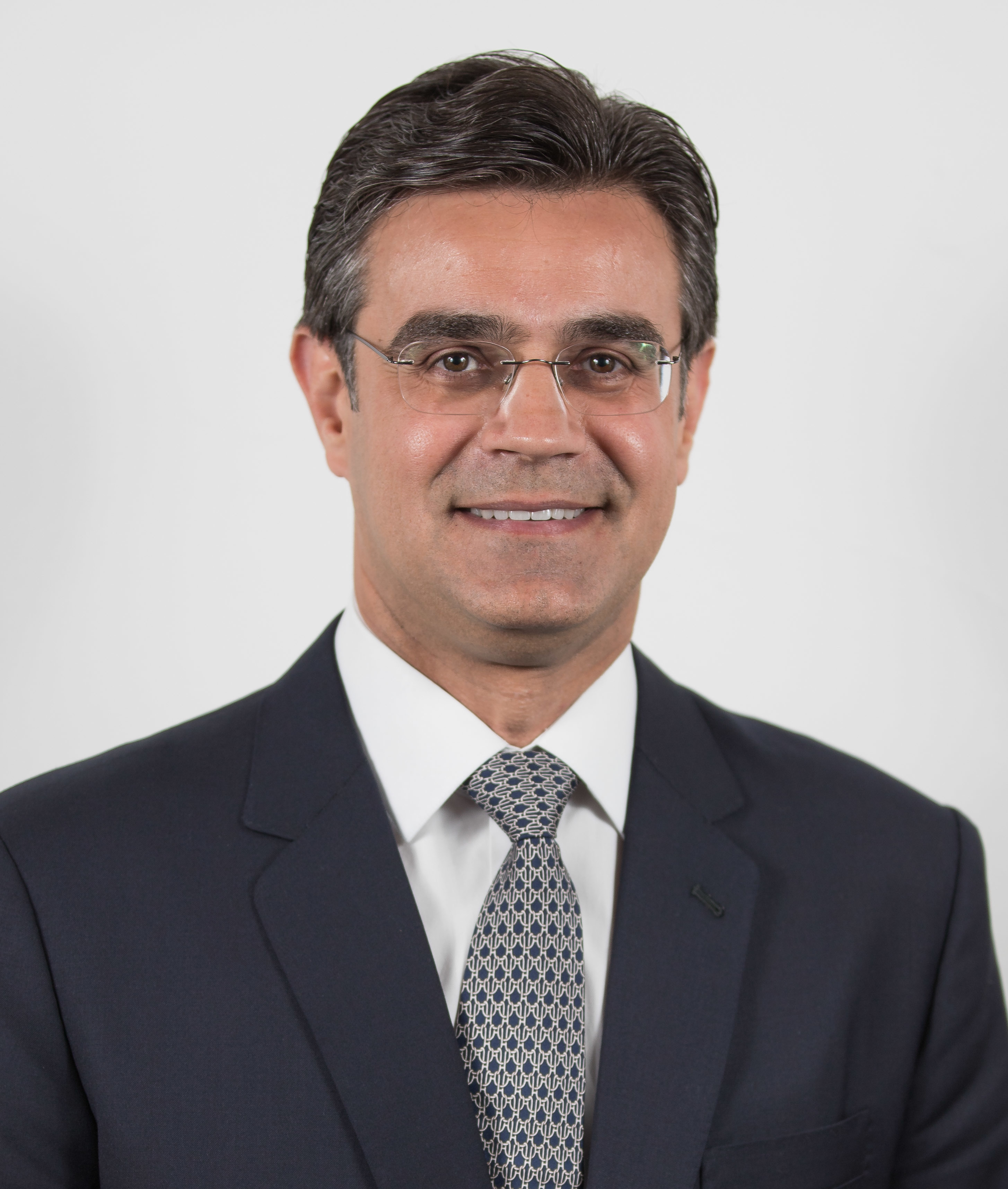
- Official portrait, 2019.

Governor of São Paulo
- In office 1 April 2022 – 31 December 2022
- Vice Governor: None
- Preceded by: João Doria
- Succeeded by: Tarcísio de Freitas

Vice Governor of São Paulo
- In office 1 January 2019 – 1 April 2022
- Governor: João Doria
- Preceded by: Márcio França
- Succeeded by: Felicio Ramuth

Secretary of Government of São Paulo
- In office 1 January 2019 – 31 March 2022
- Governor: João Doria
- Preceded by: Saulo de Castro Abreu Filho
- Succeeded by: Laura Müller Machado

Member of the Chamber of Deputies
- In office 1 February 2011 – 31 December 2018
- Constituency: São Paulo

President of the Legislative Assembly of São Paulo
- In office 15 March 2005 – 15 March 2007
- Preceded by: Sidney Estanislau Beraldo
- Succeeded by: José Carlos Vaz de Lima

State Deputy of São Paulo
- In office 15 March 1999 – 31 December 2010
- Constituency: At-large

Personal details
- Born: 10 May 1974 (age 52) Tanabi, São Paulo, Brazil
- Party: Independent
- Other political affiliations: DEM (1997–2021); PSDB (2021–2024)
- Spouse: Luciana Mara Martin (m. 1997)
- Children: 3

Rodrigo Garcia (born 10 May 1974) is a Brazilian lawyer, businessman and politician, who was affiliated with the Brazilian Social Democracy Party (PSDB). He was state deputy elected for three consecutive legislatures, 1999–2002, 2003–2006 and 2007–2010, and president of the Legislative Assembly of São Paulo from 15 March 2005 to 15 March 2007. He had served as Governor of São Paulo from April to December 2022.

== Career ==
Born in Tanabi, he left the position of deputy to head the Municipal Secretariat for Modernization, Management and Debureaucratization of the City Hall of São Paulo, from 2008 to 2010. In April 2010, he returned to the Legislative Assembly to continue his work as a state deputy for the Democrats. He was national vice president of DEM and secretary general of the party in the State of São Paulo.

In May 2011, he was invited by the governor of the State of São Paulo, Geraldo Alckmin, to assume the role of Secretary of State for Social Development.

On May 28, 2013, again by the invitation of Governor Geraldo Alckmin, he took over the role of Secretary of Economic Development, Science and Technology of the State of São Paulo, which later became the Secretary of Development of the State of São Paulo. On April 3, 2014, he left the command of the Secretariat to return to the Federal Chamber.

In the 2014 elections for the 55th legislature (2015-2019), Rodrigo was the fifth most voted federal deputy in the State of São Paulo, obtaining 336,151 votes. On February 1, 2015, he took up his fifth term. Afterwards, on March 19, 2015, he resigned from the position to assume the Secretary of State for Housing in the new government of Geraldo Alckmin. He voted in favor of impeaching Dilma Rousseff.

In the 2018 elections, he ran as vice governor on João Doria's ticket, for which he was elected in the second round.

As Secretary of Government, Rodrigo Garcia coordinates all the strategic actions of the state: vaccines, concessions, public investments, public-private partnerships and all the major management programs of the other secretariats.

In the 2022 elections, Garcia tried to run as Governor of São Paulo for a full term, but he placed third and was eliminated in the first round, thus marking the end of the 28-year rule of the Brazilian Social Democracy Party in São Paulo. Garcia left office on 31 December 2022, being succeeded by eventual winner Tarcísio de Freitas.

Political offices
Preceded by Saulo de Castro Abreu Filho	Secretary of Government of São Paulo; 2019−2022	Succeeded by Laura Müller Machado
Vacant Title last held by Márcio França	Vice Governor of São Paulo; 2019−2022	Vacant Title next held by Felicio Ramuth
Preceded by João Doria	Governor of São Paulo; 2022–2023	Succeeded by Tarcísio de Freitas
Chamber of Deputies (Brazil)
Preceded by Efraim Filho	Chamber Democrats Leader; 2018−2019	Succeeded by Elmar Nascimento
Party political offices
Preceded by Guilherme Afif Domingos	DEM nominee for Vice Governor of São Paulo; 2018	Party extinct
Preceded by João Doria	PSDB nominee for Governor of São Paulo; 2022	Most recent
