= Valter Casimiro =

Brazilian politician (born 1973)

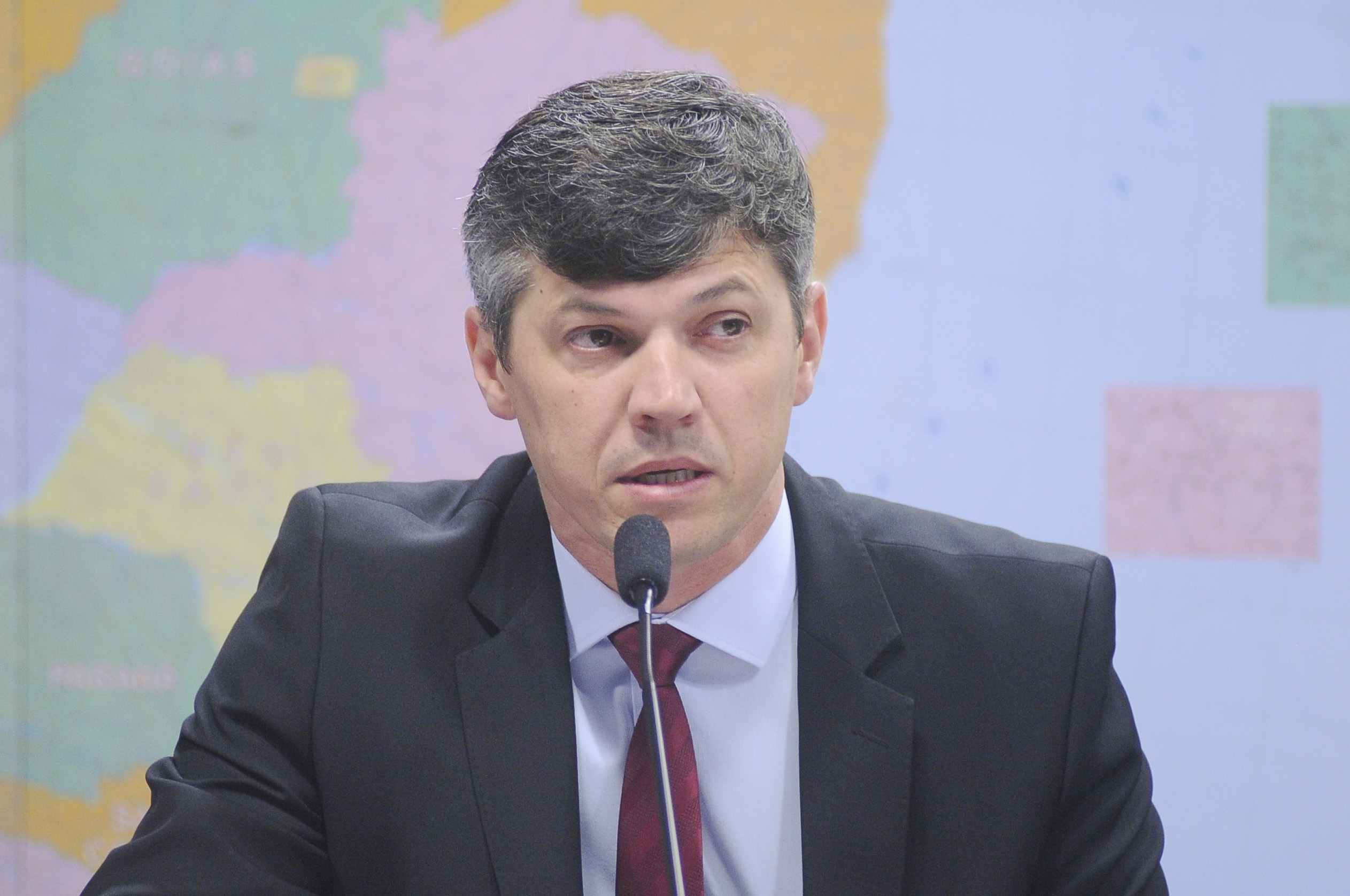
- Casimiro in 2015

Minister of Transport, Ports and Civil Aviation
- In office 2 April 2018 – 31 December 2018
- President: Michel Temer
- Preceded by: Maurício Quintella Lessa
- Succeeded by: Tarcísio de Freitas

Personal details
- Born: 29 January 1973 (age 53)
- Party: Independent

Valter Casimiro Silveira (born 29 January 1973) is a Brazilian politician. From April to December 2018, he served as minister of transport, ports and civil aviation. From 2015 to 2018, he served as director general of the National Department of Transport Infrastructure.
