= Santa Rita de Jacutinga =

- Municipality
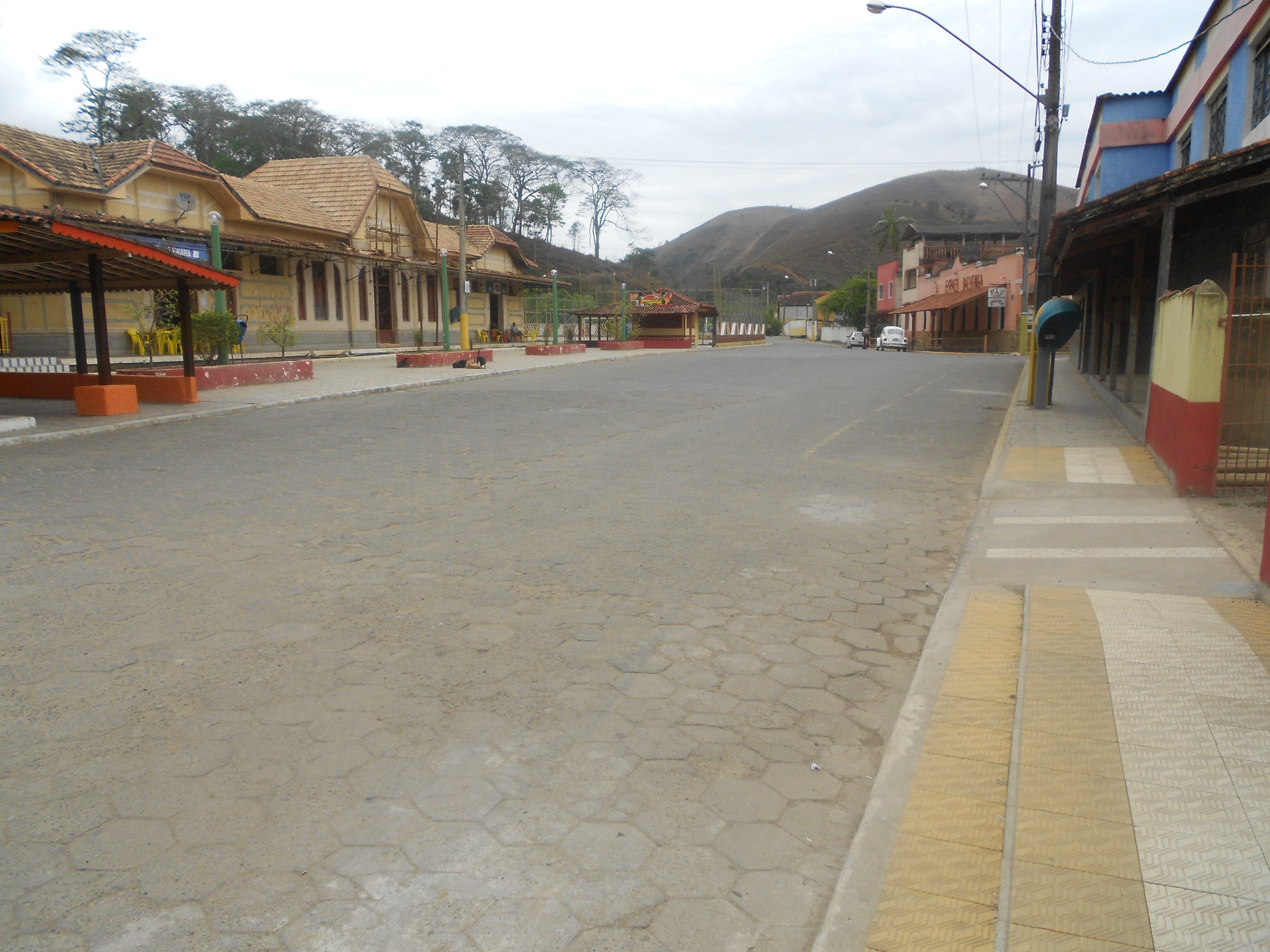

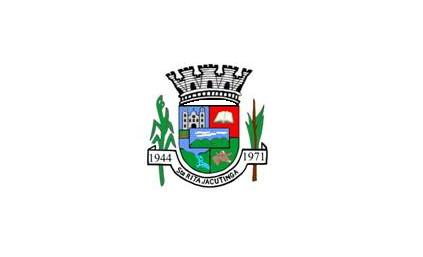
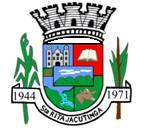
- Flag Coat of arms

- Location in Brazil
- Coordinates: 22°8′56″S 44°5′42″W
- Country: Brazil
- Region: Southeast
- State: Minas Gerais
- Mesoregion: Vale do Rio Doce

Population (2020)
  - Total: 4,863
- Time zone: UTC−3 (BRT)

Santa Rita de Jacutinga is a municipality in the state of Minas Gerais in the Southeast region of Brazil.

== See also ==
- List of municipalities in Minas Gerais
