= Ministry of Transport (Brazil) =

Brazilian ministry

- Portuguese: Ministério dos Transportes
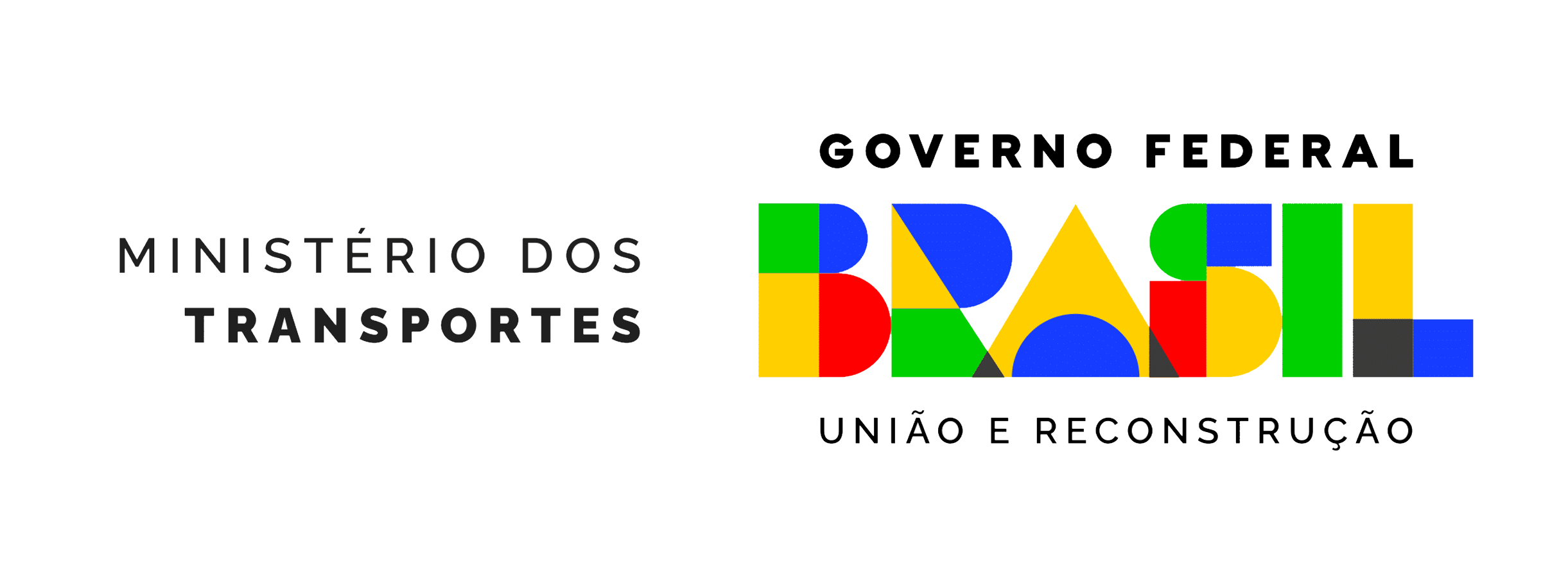

Agency overview
- Formed: 15 March 1967; 58 years ago
- Type: Ministry
- Jurisdiction: Federal government of Brazil
- Headquarters: Esplanada dos Ministérios, Bloco R Brasília, Federal District
- Annual budget: $23.34 b BRL (2023)
- Agency executives: Renan Filho, Minister; George Santoro, Executive-Secretary; Viviane Esse, Secretary of Road Transports; Leonardo Ribeiro, Secretary of Rail Transports; Adrualdo Catão, Secretary of Traffic
- Website: www.gov.br/transportes/

The Ministry of Transport or Transportation (Portuguese: Ministério dos Transportes) is a cabinet-level federal ministry in Brazil. It is the body responsible to enforce and direct regulations concerning transport, from roads and railways to ports and aviation and it also advises the President of Brazil in the execution and formulation of these policies. It was first established in 1992, during Fernando Collor de Mello's presidency. It was dissolved on 1 January 2019 during Jair Bolsonaro's government and merged into the Ministry of Infrastructure. The first minister to take office into the ministry since its re-creation in 2023 is Renan Filho.

The body was re-created by President Luiz Inácio Lula da Silva, on January 1, 2023, being a result of the dissolution and division of former Ministry of Infrastructure into the Ministry of Transport and the Ministry of Ports and Airports.

== Chronology ==
The ministry has had several denominations:

- 1860 to 1891 — Secretary of State for Agriculture, Commerce and Public Works
- 1891 to 1906 — Ministry of Industry, Transport and Public Works
- 1906 to 1967 — Ministry of Transport and Public Works
- 1967 to 1990 — Ministry of Transport
- 1990 to 1992 — Ministry of Infrastructure
- April 10, 1992 to November 19, 1992 — Ministry of Transport and Communications
- November 19, 1992 to May 12, 2016 — Ministry of Transport
- May 12, 2016 to December 31, 2018 — Ministry of Transportation, Ports and Civil Aviation
- January 1, 2019 to December 31, 2022 — Ministry of Infrastructure
- since 1 January, 2023 — Ministry of Transport (re-created for the sixth time)

== List of ministers of Transport of Brazil ==
| No. | Portrait | Minister | Took office | Left office | Time in office | Party | President |
|---|---|---|---|---|---|---|---|
| 1 | Mário Andreazza | Mário Andreazza (1918–1988) | 15 March 1967 | 15 March 1974 | 7 years, 0 days | ARENA | Costa e Silva (ARENA); Provisional Governative Junta of 1969 (Military junta); Emílio Garrastazu Médici (ARENA) |
| 2 | Dirceu de Araújo Nogueira | Dirceu de Araújo Nogueira (1912–2002) | 15 March 1974 | 15 March 1979 | 5 years, 0 days | Independent | Ernesto Geisel (ARENA) |
| 3 | Eliseu Resende | Eliseu Resende (1929–2011) | 15 March 1979 | 11 May 1982 | 3 years, 57 days | Independent | João Figueiredo (ARENA) |
| 4 | Cloraldino Soares Severo | Cloraldino Soares Severo (born 1938) | 11 May 1982 | 15 March 1985 | 2 years, 308 days | Independent | João Figueiredo (PDS) |
| 5 | Affonso Camargo Neto | Affonso Camargo Neto (1929–2011) | 15 March 1985 | 14 February 1986 | 336 days | MDB | José Sarney (MDB) |
| 6 | José Reinaldo Tavares | José Reinaldo Tavares (born 1939) | 14 February 1986 | 15 March 1990 | 4 years, 29 days | MDB | José Sarney (MDB) |
| 7 | Affonso Camargo Neto | Affonso Camargo Neto (1929–2011) | 13 April 1992 | 2 October 1992 | 172 days | PTB | Fernando Collor (PRN) |
| 8 | Alberto Goldman | Alberto Goldman (1937–2019) | 2 October 1992 | 21 December 1993 | 1 year, 80 days | MDB | Itamar Franco (MDB) |
| 9 | Margarida Coimbra | Margarida Coimbra (born 1955) | 21 December 1993 | 3 March 1994 | 72 days | Independent | Itamar Franco (MDB) |
| 10 | Rubens Bayma Denys | Rubens Bayma Denys (born 1929) | 3 March 1994 | 1 January 1995 | 304 days | Independent | Itamar Franco (MDB) |
| 11 | Odacir Klein | Odacir Klein (born 1943) | 1 January 1995 | 15 August 1996 | 1 year, 227 days | MDB | Fernando Henrique Cardoso (PSDB) |
| – | Alcides Saldanha | Alcides Saldanha (1937–2015); Acting | 15 August 1996 | 21 May 1997 | 279 days | MDB | Fernando Henrique Cardoso (PSDB) |
| 12 | Eliseu Padilha | Eliseu Padilha (1945–2023) | 21 May 1997 | 14 November 2001 | 4 years, 177 days | MDB | Fernando Henrique Cardoso (PSDB) |
| – | Alderico Lima | Alderico Lima; Acting | 14 November 2001 | 2 April 2002 | 139 days | Independent | Fernando Henrique Cardoso (PSDB) |
| 13 | João Henrique de Almeida Sousa | João Henrique de Almeida Sousa (born 1950) | 2 April 2002 | 1 January 2003 | 274 days | MDB | Fernando Henrique Cardoso (PSDB) |
| 14 | Anderson Adauto | Anderson Adauto (born 1957) | 1 January 2003 | 15 August 2004 | 1 year, 227 days | PL | Luiz Inácio Lula da Silva (PT) |
| 15 | Alfredo Nascimento | Alfredo Nascimento (born 1952) | 15 August 2004 | 31 March 2006 | 1 year, 228 days | PL | Luiz Inácio Lula da Silva (PT) |
| 16 | Paulo Sérgio Passos | Paulo Sérgio Passos (born 1950) | 3 April 2006 | 29 March 2007 | 360 days | PL | Luiz Inácio Lula da Silva (PT) |
| 17 | Alfredo Nascimento | Alfredo Nascimento (born 1952) | 29 March 2007 | 31 March 2010 | 3 years, 2 days | PL | Luiz Inácio Lula da Silva (PT) |
| 18 | Paulo Sérgio Passos | Paulo Sérgio Passos (born 1950) | 31 March 2010 | 1 January 2011 | 276 days | PL | Luiz Inácio Lula da Silva (PT) |
| 19 | Alfredo Nascimento | Alfredo Nascimento (born 1952) | 1 January 2011 | 6 July 2011 | 186 days | PL | Dilma Rousseff (PT) |
| 20 | Paulo Sérgio Passos | Paulo Sérgio Passos (born 1950) | 6 July 2011 | 1 April 2013 | 1 year, 269 days | PL | Dilma Rousseff (PT) |
| 21 | César Borges | César Borges (born 1948) | 1 April 2013 | 26 June 2014 | 1 year, 86 days | PL | Dilma Rousseff (PT) |
| 22 | Paulo Sérgio Passos | Paulo Sérgio Passos (born 1950) | 26 June 2014 | 1 January 2015 | 189 days | PL | Dilma Rousseff (PT) |
| 23 | Antonio Carlos Rodrigues | Antonio Carlos Rodrigues (born 1950) | 1 January 2015 | 12 May 2016 | 1 year, 132 days | PL | Dilma Rousseff (PT) |
| 24 | Maurício Quintella Lessa | Maurício Quintella Lessa (born 1971) | 12 May 2016 | 2 April 2018 | 1 year, 325 days | PL | Michel Temer (MDB) |
| 25 | Valter Casimiro | Valter Casimiro (born 1973) | 2 April 2018 | 1 January 2019 | 274 days | Independent | Michel Temer (MDB) |
| 26 | Renan Filho | Renan Filho (born 1979) | 1 January 2023 | Incumbent | 3 years, 50 days | MDB | Luiz Inácio Lula da Silva (PT) |

== See also ==
- Other ministries of Transport
