= Lúcia França =

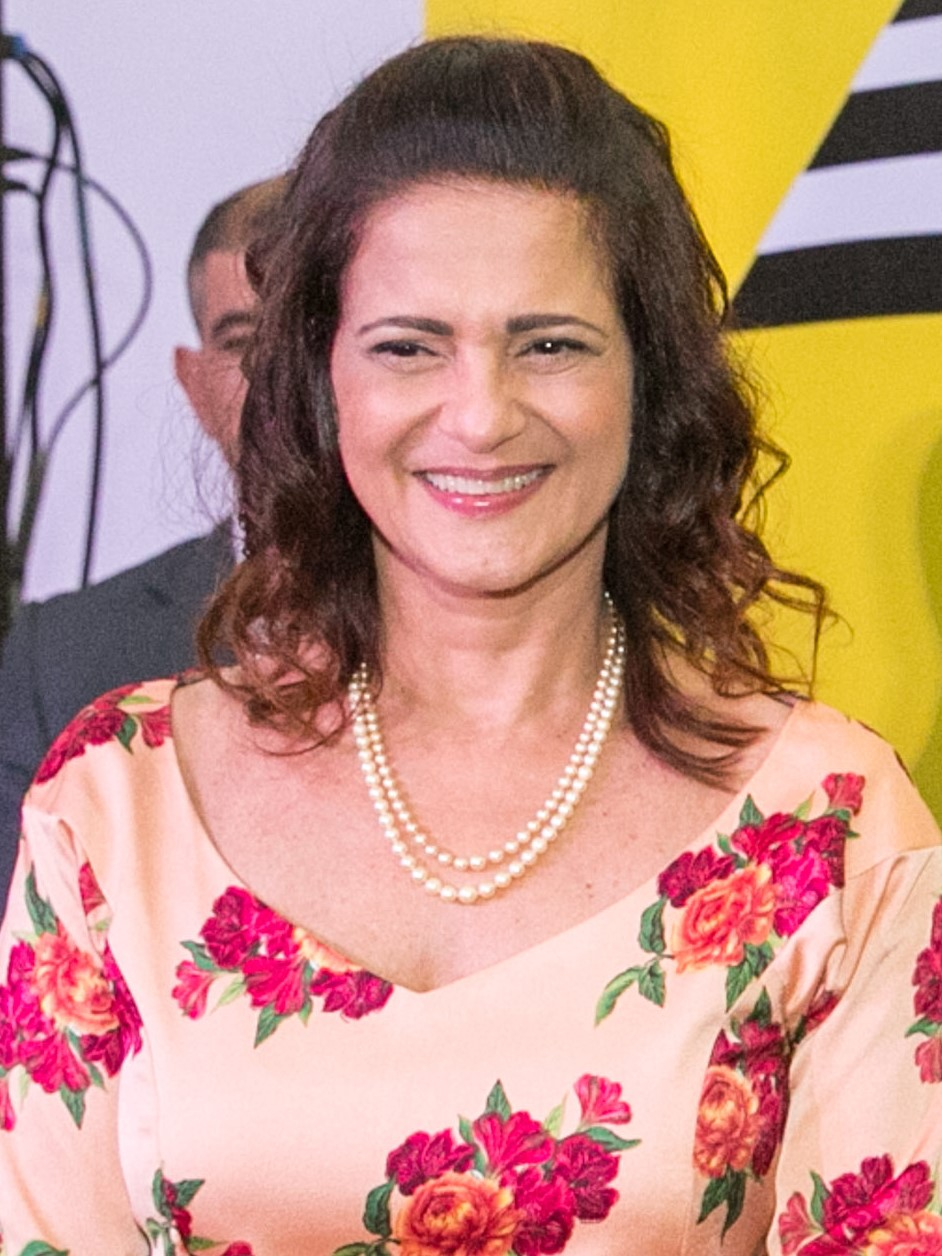
- França in 2018

First Lady of São Paulo
- In role 6 April 2018 – 31 December 2018
- Governor: Márcio França
- Preceded by: Lu Alckmin
- Succeeded by: Bia Doria

Second Lady of São Paulo
- In role 1 January 2015 – 6 April 2018
- Vice Governor: Márcio França
- Preceded by: Silvia Domingos
- Succeeded by: Luciana Garcia

Personal details
- Born: Lúcia Massis de Gouvêa; 28 January 1962 (age 64) São Paulo, Brazil
- Party: PSB (1988–present)
- Spouse: Márcio França (m. 1986)
- Children: 2, including Caio
- Profession: Professor

Lúcia Massis de Gouvêa França Gomes (born 28 January 1962) is a Brazilian professor filiated to the Brazilian Socialist Party. The wife of Márcio França, she served as First Lady of the state of São Paulo and also as president of Fundo Social São Paulo.

== Biography ==
Lúcia França was born in São Paulo, but moved to São Vicente at the age of 10. At the age of 17, she graduated in teaching, influenced by her mother who worked in school in São Vicente until being approved to work in Praia Grande. Married with Márcio França since 1986, they had met when they were teenagers. They have two children: pedagogue Helena and lawyer and state deputy Caio França, besides two grandchildren, Enzo and Laura.

She became First Lady of São Paulo on 6 April 2018 after her husband took office as Governor due to the resignation of then Governor Geraldo Alckmin.

From 1997 to 2004, she served as president of Fundo Social de Solidariedade in the municipality of São Vicente.

In 2022, Gouvêa was announced as running mate of Fernando Haddad in the 2022 state election.

Honorary titles
Preceded by Silvia Domingos	Second Lady of São Paulo; 2015–2019	Vacant Title next held by Luciana Garcia
Preceded by Lu Alckmin	First Lady of São Paulo; 2018–2019	Succeeded by Bia Doria
