= Maurício Quintella Lessa =

Brazilian lawyer and politician

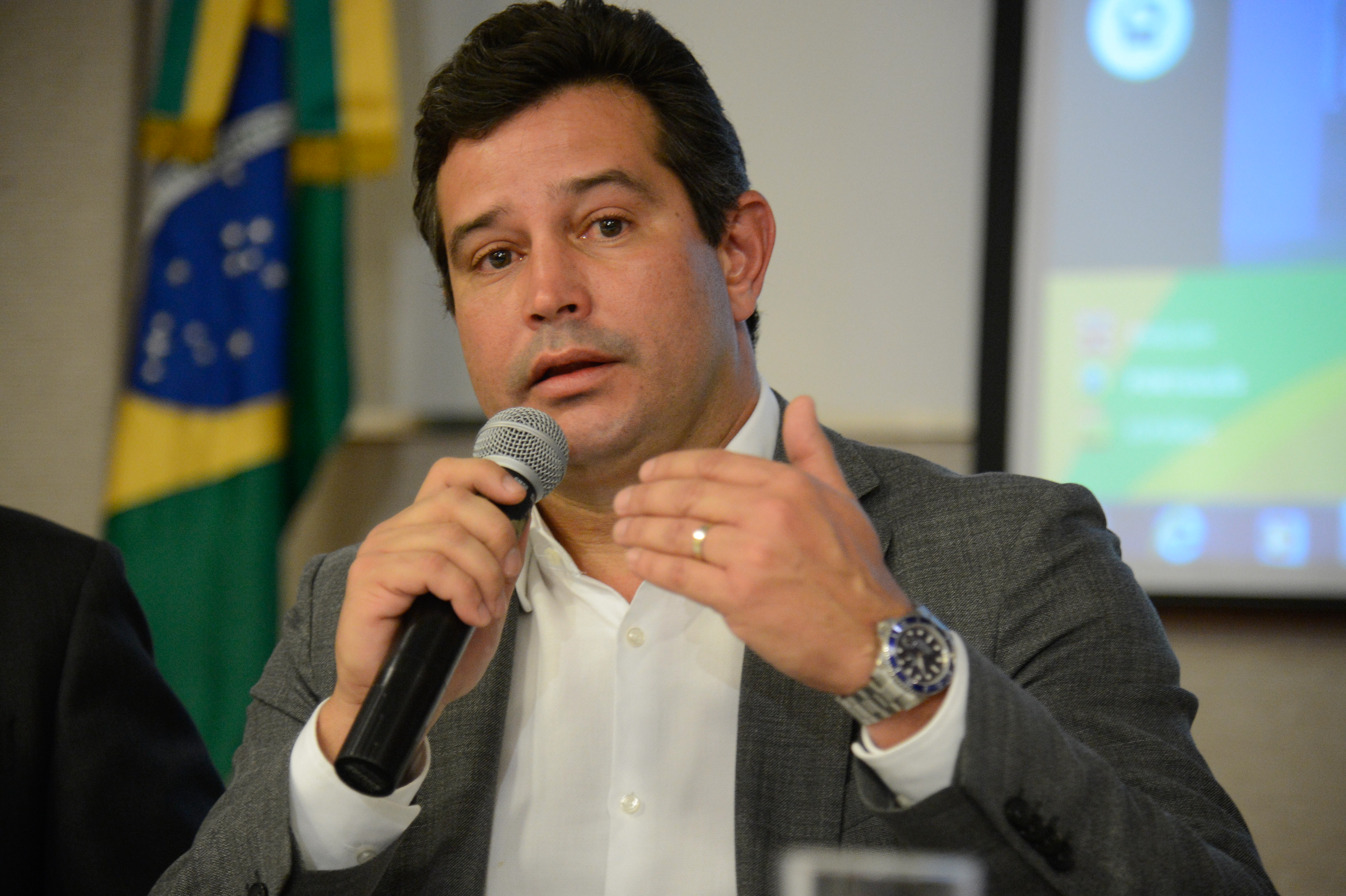

Federal Deputy from Alagoas
- In office 1 February 2003 – 1 February 2019

Minister of Transports, Ports and Civil Aviation
- In office 12 May 2016 – 6 April 2018
- President: Michel Temer
- Preceded by: Antonio Carlos Rodrigues
- Succeeded by: Valter Casimiro

City Councillor of Maceió
- In office 1 January 1997 – 1 January 2003

Personal details
- Born: Maurício Quintella Malta Lessa; 28 March 1971 (age 55) Maceió, AL, Brazil
- Party: MDB (Since 2022)
- Other political affiliations: PSB (1996–2006); PDT (2006–2010); PL (2010–2022)
- Occupation: Lawyer

Maurício Quintella Malta Lessa (born 28 March 1971 in Maceió) is a Brazilian lawyer and politician. Discharged from the Chamber of Deputies, Lessa assumed the office of minister of Transports, Ports and Civil Aviation, appointed by president Michel Temer. Left the Ministry to run for a new term as deputy, returning to the Chamber consequently.

Political offices
Preceded by Antonio Carlos Rodrigues	Minister of Transports, Ports and Civil Aviation; 2016–2018	Succeeded by Valter Casimiro
