= Renan Filho =

Brazilian economist and politician

- Official portrait

Minister of Transport
- In office 1 January 2023 – 1 April 2026
- President: Luiz Inácio Lula da Silva
- Preceded by: Marcelo Sampaio (as Minister of Infrastructure)
- Succeeded by: George Santoro

Senator for Alagoas
- Incumbent
- Assumed office 1 February 2023
- Preceded by: Fernando Collor

Governor of Alagoas
- In office 1 January 2015 – 2 April 2022
- Vice Governor: Luciano Barbosa (2015–2020); Vacant (2021–2022)
- Preceded by: Teotônio Vilela Filho
- Succeeded by: Klever Loureiro (acting)

Member of the Chamber of Deputies
- In office 1 February 2011 – 1 January 2015
- Constituency: Alagoas

Mayor of Murici
- In office 1 January 2005 – 6 April 2010
- Vice Mayor: Rita Tenorio (2005–2008); Remi Calheiros (2009–2010)
- Preceded by: Remi Calheiros
- Succeeded by: Remi Calheiros

Personal details
- Born: José Renan Vasconcelos Calheiros Filho; 8 December 1979 (age 46) Murici, Alagoas, Brazil
- Party: MDB (2003–present)
- Spouse: Renata Pires
- Children: 2
- Parents: Renan Calheiros (father); Maria Verônica Rodrigues (mother)
- Education: University of Brasília
- Profession: Economist

José Renan Vasconcelos Calheiros Filho (born December 8, 1979) is a Brazilian economist and politician. He is a former governor of Alagoas, who served from January 2015 to April 2022. He is affiliated with the Brazilian Democratic Movement.

He was elected mayor of the municipality of Murici, Alagoas, in the 2004 election, and was re-elected in 2008. In early April 2010, he resigned to possibly play a state office of Member of the Legislative Assembly, replaced by Remi Calheiros, former mayor and who was his deputy.

In the elections of October 2010 he was elected Congressman, and that election the most voted candidate of Alagoas. was the one who received the most votes in 22 of the 104 Alagoas state municipalities.

He is the son of the previous president of the Senate, Renan Calheiros, and Maria Veronica Rodrigues Calheiros.

In October 2014, he was elected in the first round governor of Alagoas with 52.16% of the votes.

In 2022, he was elected senator for Alagoas, receiving 845,988 votes.

Political offices
Preceded by Remi Calheiros	Mayor of Murici; 2005–2010	Succeeded by Remi Calheiros
Preceded by Teotônio Vilela Filho	Governor of Alagoas; 2015–2022	Succeeded by Klever Loureiro (interim)
Preceded by Marcelo Sampaio as Minister of Infrastructure	Minister of Transport; 2023–2026	Succeeded by George Santoro
