= Catholic University of Santos =

Private Catholic university in Santos, Brazil

- Universidade Católica de Santos
- Coat of arms of the university
- Other names: UniSantos, Católica de Santos
- Motto: Dilatentur spatia veritatis
- Motto in English: Expand the space for the good
- Type: Private, non-profit
- Established: February 7, 1986
- Religious affiliation: Roman Catholic Church
- Chancellor: Dom Tarcísio Scaramussa
- Rector: Marcos Medina Leite
- Vice rector: Roseane Marques da Graça Lopes
- Location: Santos, São Paulo, Brazil; 23.95°S 46.32°W
- Campus: Urban
- Colors: Blue and white
- Website: www.unisantos.br

The Catholic University of Santos (Portuguese: Universidade Católica de Santos, UniSantos or Católica de Santos) is a Brazilian private and non-profit Catholic university, located in Santos, São Paulo, the first university in the region of the city. It is one of the largest and most prestigious higher education institutions in Brazil, with many of its courses among the best ranked in the country, including Law, International Relations, Journalism, History, Psychology, Business Administration and Engineering. It is maintained by the Catholic Diocese of Santos.

== History ==
UNISANTOS's history began in 1951 when the Society was founded by Visconde de São Leopoldo. The initial goal was to establish the School of Law. Thereafter, the university expanded to include a school of Philosophy, Sciences and Letters, Communication, Economics and Business, School of Architecture, School of Social Work, School of Nursing, School of Pharmacy and Biochemistry, and School of Engineering.

As a member of the Brazilian Association of Community Universities, the UNISANTOS provides part of their revenue to provide funding for scholarships, free hospital visits, psychology clinics, and legal assistance, among others. Additionally, it maintains the Open University for the Elderly, a pioneer project in the region.

The UNISANTOS has an agreement to exchange students with foreign institutions located in Portugal, Spain, Germany, Mexico and Costa Rica.
