= Latin America Memorial =

Cultural complex in São Paulo, Brazil

Coordinates: 23°31′38″S 46°39′55″W

- Memorial da América Latina
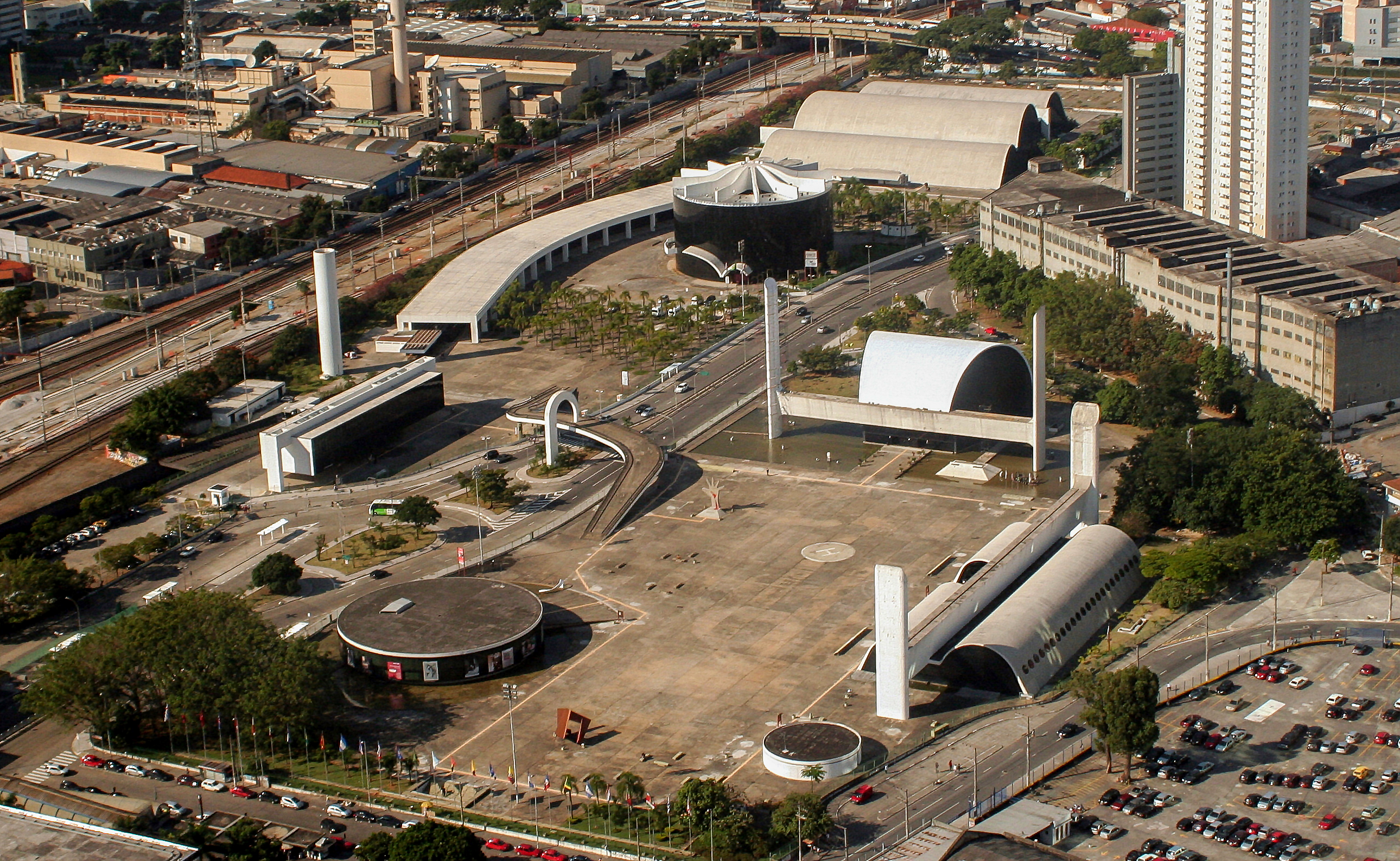

- Location within Brazil
- Established: March 18, 1989
- Location: São Paulo, SP, Brazil
- Type: Cultural center
- Visitors: 2,000,000 (2016)
- Director: Pedro Machado Mastrobuono
- Architect: Oscar Niemeyer
- Website: memorial.org.br

The Latin America Memorial (Portuguese: Memorial da América Latina) is a cultural, political and leisure complex, inaugurated on March 18, 1989, in São Paulo, Brazil. The architectural setting, designed by Oscar Niemeyer, is a monument to the cultural, political, social and economic integration of Latin America, spanning an area of 84,482 m^{2} (909,360 sq ft). Its cultural project was developed by Brazilian anthropologist Darcy Ribeiro. It is a public foundation, financially and administratively autonomous, maintained by the state government.

The architectural complex consists of several buildings arranged around two squares, with a total built area of 25,210 m^{2} (271,400 sq ft). It comprises: Salão de Atos Tiradentes (Tiradentes "hall of acts"), the Victor Civita Latin American Library, the Brazilian Center of Latin American Studies, the Marta Traba Gallery of Latin American Art, the Pavilhão da Criatividade ("creativity pavilion") and the Símon Bolívar Auditorium. In the main square (Praça Cívica), there is a large concrete sculpture, also designed by Oscar Niemeyer, representing an open hand in vertical position, with the map of Latin America painted in red. It's a symbol of Latin America's past of oppression and its battles for freedom, with the red map as a reminder of the blood from the sacrifices that were made.

The Memorial has a permanent collection of works of art, on display in indoor and outdoor areas, as well as a large assemblage of Latin American folk art, housed in the Pavilhão da Criatividade. The library comprises 30,000 titles, besides music and image departments. The Memorial promotes exhibitions, conferences, debates, video sessions, theater, dance and music performances. It also has a research center specializing in Latin American issues and keeps an active bibliographic production. From 1989 to 2007, the Memorial also served as a host to the Latin American Parliament (currently located in Panama City).

== History ==
The idea of creating an institution devoted to improving Latin American political, social, economic and cultural relations in São Paulo dates back to the André Franco Montoro government, which took place in the mid-1980s, in a cultural context defined by democratic advances across the continent and by a greater alignment of interests between Brazil and other Latin American countries, notably Argentina. In 1985, Brazil and Argentina signed the Iguaçu Declaration in 1985, the founding agreement for the future emergence of Mercosur. During his term in the São Paulo state government, Franco Montoro created the Latin American Institute (ILAM) as an effort to expand cultural exchange among the countries of the region. ILAM would organize a bibliographic collection of around 10,000 items, in addition to photographs, videos and other materials related to Latin American culture, which would later serve as the primary collection for the Memorial's library.

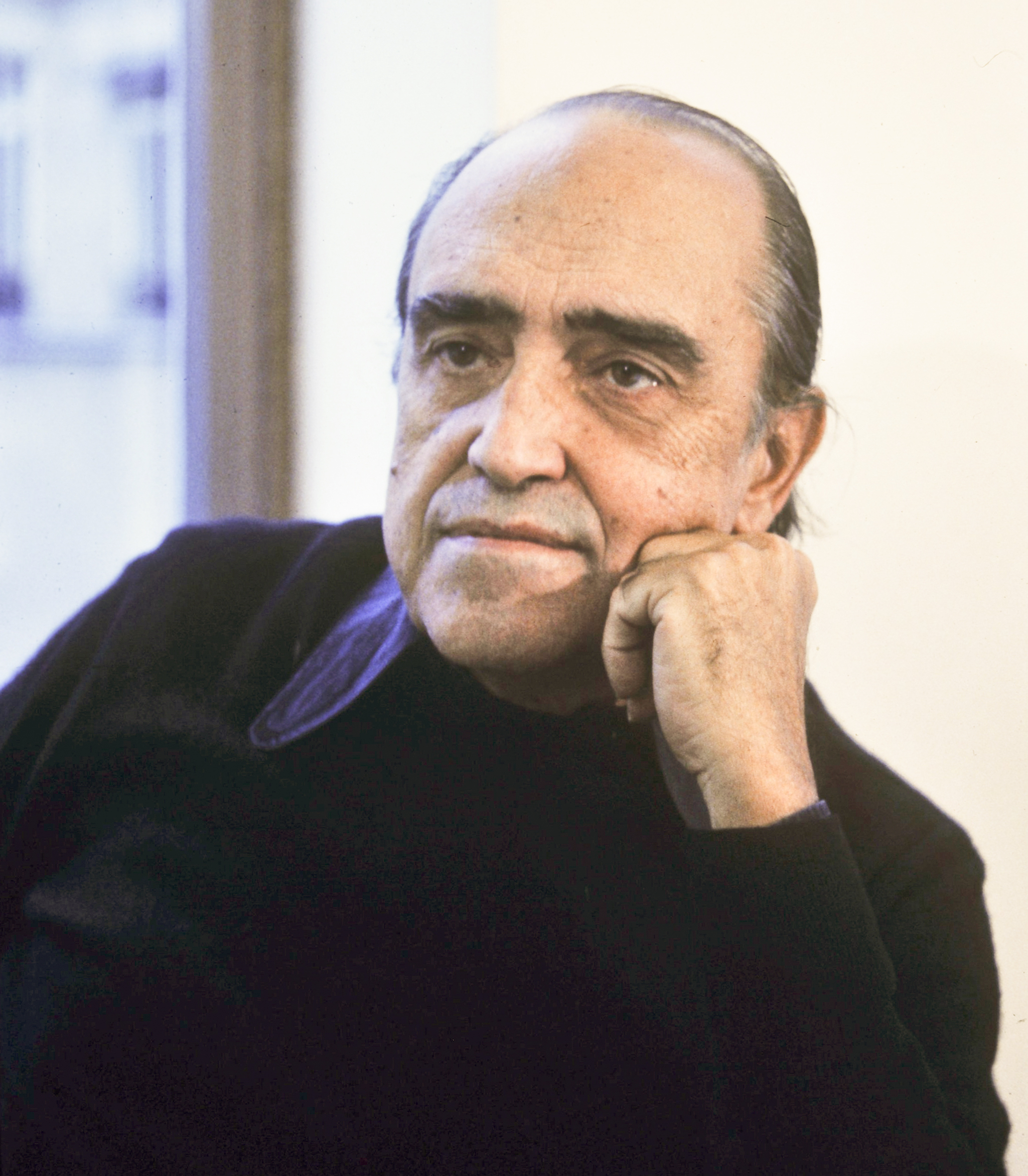
Oscar Niemeyer, in 1977

However, the actual construction of the Memorial and the conception of its cultural program would only begin during the Orestes Quércia government, who intended to build in São Paulo "the most important cultural center of the Latin American continent". The architect Oscar Niemeyer was then commissioned by Quércia to design a monumental complex, to be built on a public site of around 90,000 m^{2} (970,000 sq ft) in the Barra Funda neighborhood. Niemeyer designed a complex made up of six buildings spread across two plazas joined by a walkway: the library, the Salão de Atos, the restaurant (now the Marta Traba Gallery), the Creativity Pavilion, the auditorium and the study center. The headquarters building of the Latin American Parliament was added later on. The architect envisioned the complex as an "architectural island", with bold, white forms, that would also serve to revitalize the surrounding urban fabric. The theme appealed to him, as he would later declare:

Few themes gave me as much joy to design as the Latin America Memorial. First, because of the political meaning it represented. Bringing together the peoples of this continent to discuss their problems together, exchanging experiences, fighting for the rights of this Latin America, so exploited and offended. Then, because it was a set of buildings that, if well designed, could create what in architecture we call an architectural spectacle.

— Oscar Niemeyer

At Niemeyer's suggestion, the anthropologist Darcy Ribeiro was invited to develop the cultural project for the memorial, also collaborating in defining the elements needed for the architectural complex. Chief of the Civil House during the presidency of João Goulart, Darcy Ribeiro had his political rights revoked after the 1964 military coup, living from then on in exile in several Latin American countries (he worked in Uruguay, Venezuela and Mexico and was an adviser to Salvador Allende in Chile and to Velasco Alvarado in Peru), thus having a great affinity with the project's theme. Ribeiro had also previously collaborated with Niemeyer on the design of the Integrated Centers of Public Education (CIEPs), another reason that led the architect to recommend him for the role.

Darcy Ribeiro had the support of the Institute for Advanced Studies of the University of São Paulo (USP) in conceiving the cultural project. Furthermore, he invited several intellectuals connected to USP to draft the profile of the future institution, such as Antonio Candido, Alfredo Bosi and Carlos Guilherme Mota. The project was based on the premise of proposing the grouping of the different Latin American realities into a single set of problems, drawing on the consistent similarities among the region's peoples. Ribeiro also conceived the creation of the Brazilian Center for Latin American Studies (CBEAL) to serve as the memorial's academic branch, a coordinating body bringing together three public universities in São Paulo state (USP, Unesp and Unicamp), the state's Research Foundation and the Secretariat of Development, devoted to fostering and debating ideas and research that could turn the memorial into a catalyzing center of initiatives for Latin American development.

In 1988, to assemble the institution's collection of Latin American popular art, Darcy Ribeiro created a working group made up of the photographer Maureen Bisilliat, her husband Jacques Bisilliat, a specialist in popular art, and the architect Antônio Marcos da Silva, responsible for collecting the items on trips made to Mexico, Guatemala, Ecuador, Peru and Paraguay. Later, Maureen would take on the role of curator of the Creativity Pavilion, where the pieces were subsequently exhibited.

From an architectural standpoint, the construction of the memorial would represent for Niemeyer the opportunity to implement in Brazil the technological advances used in the previous decade in the project for the University of Constantine, in Algiers. The massing of the main buildings would be resolved by means of large surfaces of concrete and glass, with well-marked vertical counterpoints. The buildings would be made with structures described by engineer José Carlos Süssekind as "bold";standing out, above all, the library with its supports located outside the building, joined by a 90 m (300 ft) beam, allowing a completely open interior, and the auditorium with three vaults, which can be considered a kind of reinterpretation of his work on the Pampulha Church. The unity of the complex would be ensured by the widespread use of curved surfaces, painted white.

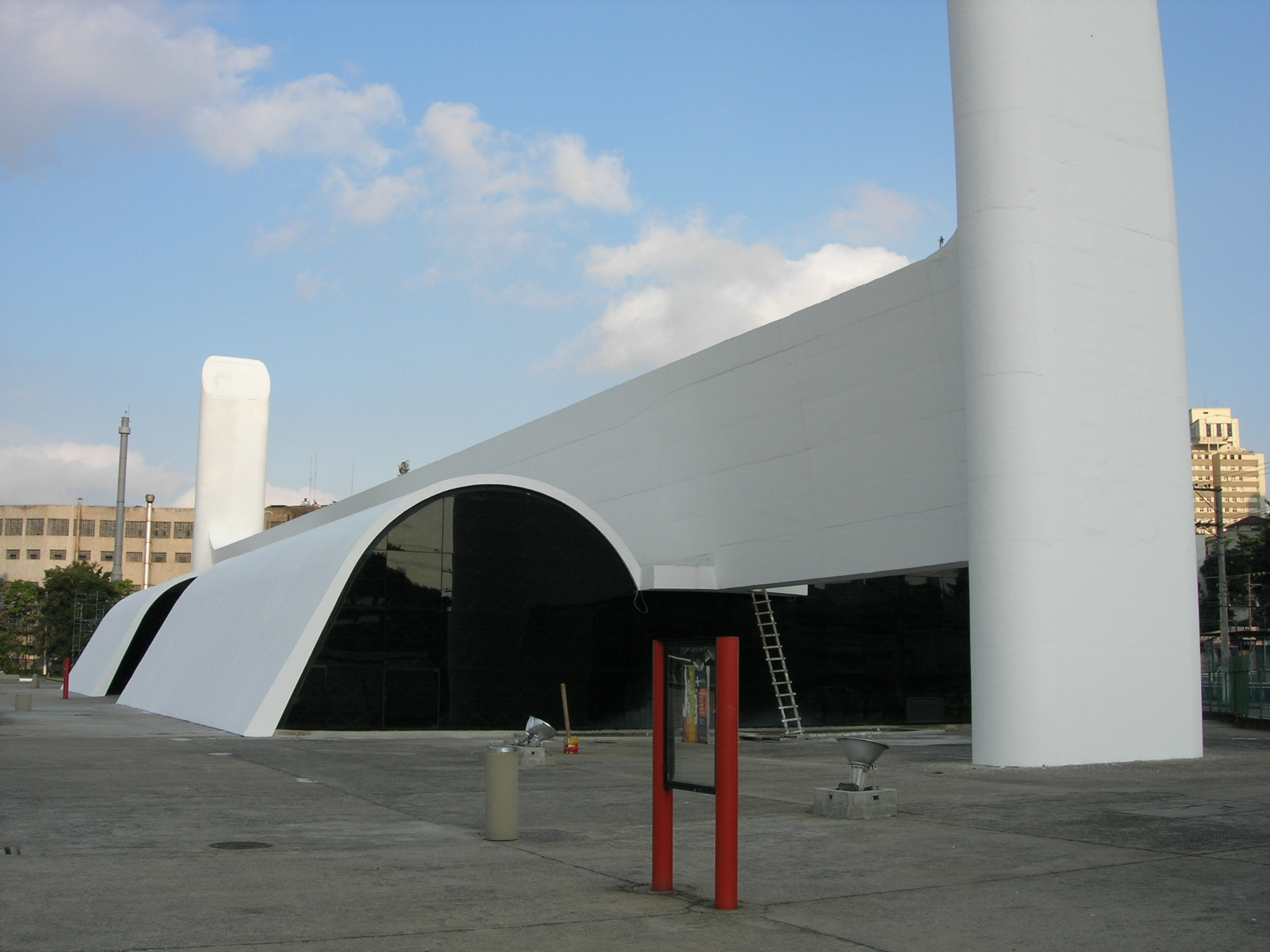
Victor Civita Latin American Library

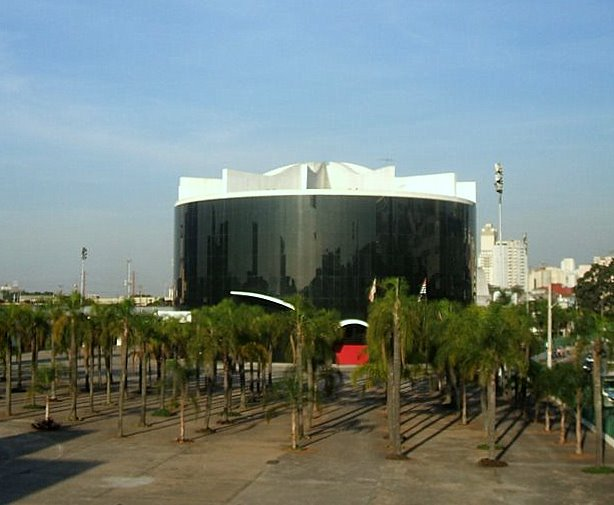
Former headquarters of the Latin American Parliament

Work on the memorial began in October 1987, involving more than a thousand workers and using about 2,200 tonnes of steel. Construction proceeded at an accelerated pace: upon completion of the work, the newspaper O Estado de S. Paulo noted that "rarely has a work of such grandeur arisen from nothing, with such speed". The inauguration took place on March 18, 1989. On July 8 of that same year, Orestes Quércia sanctioned Law No. 6,472, establishing the Latin America Memorial Foundation, granting the newly created facility the status of an administratively and financially autonomous body. At the time of its inauguration, there were several criticisms of the project's execution. Built without a competitive bidding process, the memorial cost the public treasury ten times more than the initially projected amount. There were also criticisms of the architectural approach and usefulness of the project.

In its first years of operation, the Latin America Memorial gained visibility through events aimed at broad audiences, especially free music performances that brought together thousands of people. Included in this list are, among others, names such as Mercedes Sosa, Astor Piazzolla, Libertad Lamarque, Caetano Veloso and Tom Jobim. Other notable artistic events during the period were the performances of the Cuban National Ballet, the Israel Philharmonic Orchestra (under the direction of Zubin Mehta) and the Brasil Jazz Sinfônica. In the visual arts field, the Memorial hosted important shows, such as the retrospectives of Johann Moritz Rugendas, Fernando Botero and Oswaldo Guayasamín, as well as an exhibition dedicated to the writer and photographer Juan Rulfo. The Memorial also sought to foster its own cultural production, creating the magazine Nova América, aimed at showcasing the continent's artistic and cultural expressions and to promote exchange among academic, intellectual and artistic communities. Launched in 1989, the magazine currently has a quarterly frequency and a print run of 3,000 copies, distributed to public libraries and Latin American and Spanish universities and also sold at some points in São Paulo.

As the headquarters of the Latin American Parliament and through the activities developed around the "Presidents of Latin America" project, established in 2006, the Memorial received important figures from the political and intellectual world, from ambassadors and consuls to heads of state. Some of the visitors include Mikhail Gorbachev, Bill Clinton, Fidel Castro, Mário Soares, Eduardo Duhalde, César Gaviria, Hugo Chávez, Pope Benedict XVI and the Brazilian leaders Fernando Henrique Cardoso and Luiz Inácio Lula da Silva.

Recently, the memorial has sought to offer activities aimed at audience development and the dissemination of contemporary Latin American cultural production. The São Paulo Latin American Film Festival and the Ibero-American Theatre Festival stand out among these initiatives. In April 2006, the Latin America Memorial Chair was created to promote the development of relevant themes through the systematic study of the cultural, historical and political realities of Latin American countries. It was awarded the UNESCO endorsement in 2007. In 2009, the Memorial launched the Virtual Library of Latin America to organize and disseminate information resources about the region and to coordinate mechanisms for accessing and disseminating the cultural, artistic, and technical-scientific output of leading institutions in the field. The Sementeira project, aimed at encouraging the study of literature in elementary schools, is also among the initiatives.

=== Fire at the Simón Bolívar Auditorium in 2013 ===
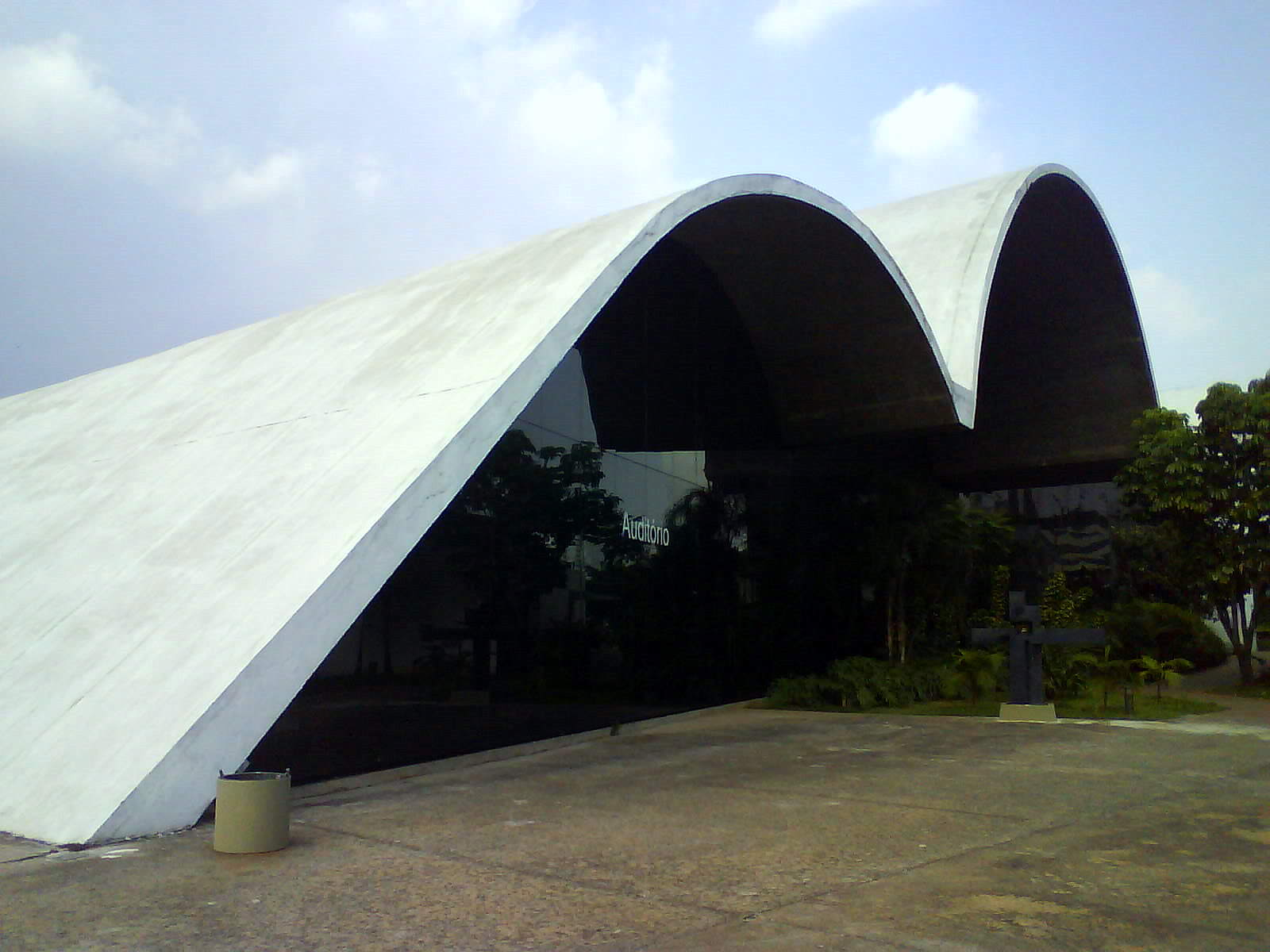
Simón Bolívar Auditorium

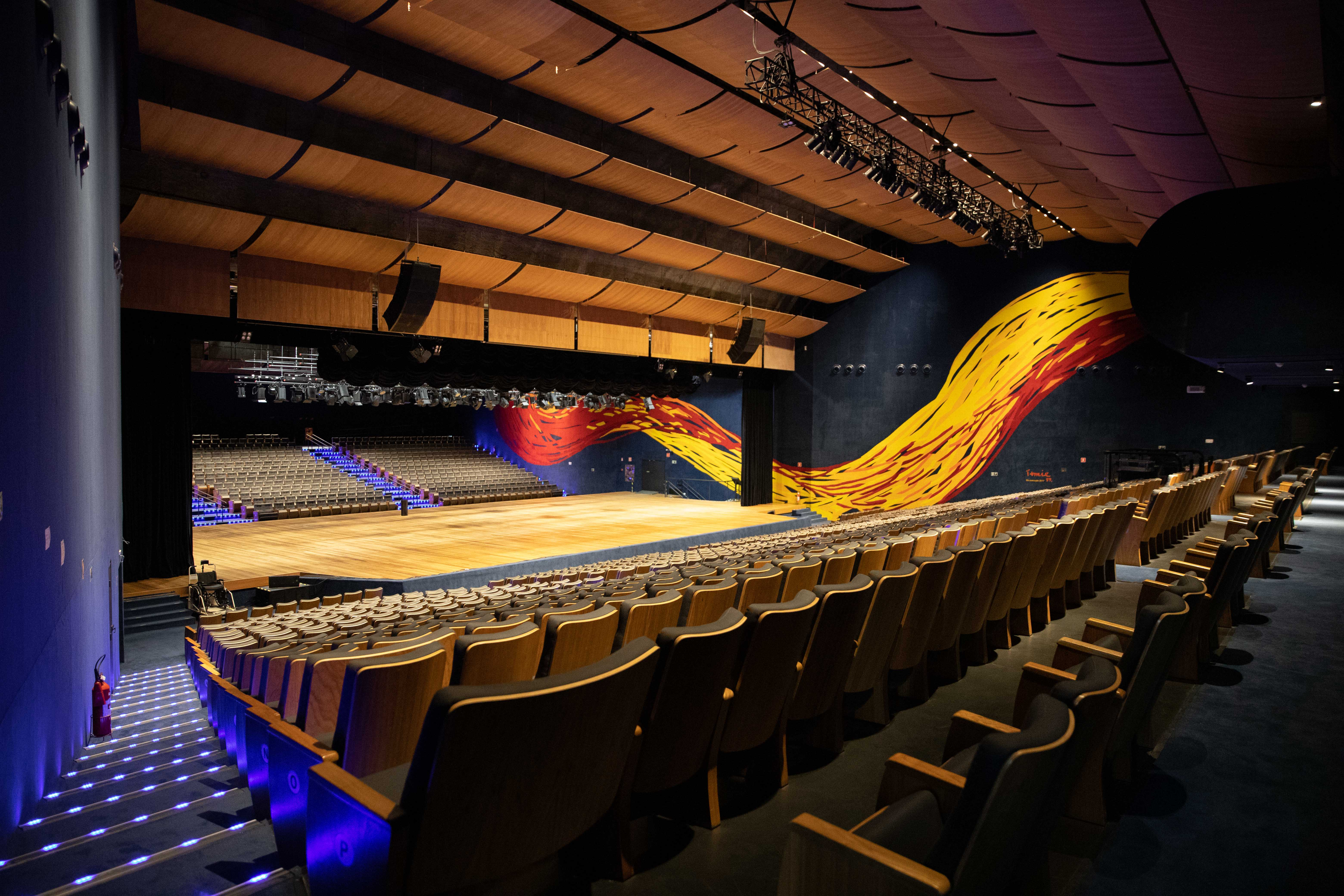
Inside the auditorium after the renovation

On November 29, 2013, around 3 p.m., a large fire struck the Simón Bolívar Auditorium, causing an extensive destruction of its inner parts. The firefighting and mop-up operation lasted about 15 hours, ending on the 30th, and involved more than 100 firefighters. 25 firefighters were wounded, many of them because a flashover occurred during their attempt to ventilate the building. Seven of them were affected by smoke inhalation, four of whom were hospitalized in serious condition at the Hospital das Clínicas (HC). Three remained in the HC's ICU. The fire destroyed at least 90% of the auditorium, which had a capacity of 1,800 people. An 800 m^{2} (8,600 sq ft) tapestry that decorated the space (a work by the visual artist Tomie Ohtake) was entirely destroyed. In a statement, the visual artist Tomie Ohtake said that the tapestry was a commission from the architect Oscar Niemeyer and that it would be a great challenge. The difficulty lay in changing the traditional rectangular base of the piece. Ohtake also said that she sought to maintain the union between the audience and the stage in the design of the tapestry. Other significant losses were not disclosed by the Memorial's administration. Some employees stated the original blueprints from Oscar Niemeyer were inside the building.

A police inquiry into the case was opened at the 23rd Police District, in the Perdizes neighborhood. The Scientific Police's deadline to conclude the report on the causes of the fire was 30 days, extendable for an equal period. The main hypothesis is that a short circuit caused the first sparks. There were reports among the firefighters that the fire wardens had used a water fire extinguisher on a burning lamp inside the auditorium, which is not recommended. In addition, the building's fire hydrants were not working.

The Latin America Memorial Foundation had to hire a technical study to attest to the building's safety conditions and indicate whether the building would need to undergo structural renovations. The auditorium could only be reopened after this study was presented to the Civil Defense.

On December 3, the Public Prosecutor's Office of the São Paulo state opened a civil inquiry to determine the causes of the fire. The prosecutor Camila Mansour Magalhães da Silveira, responsible for the case, would investigate the building's safety conditions, mainly regarding the electrical installations. According to the São Paulo City Hall, the Memorial's auditorium operated without a proper operating permit. The prosecutor requested information on the matter from the Civil Police, the Institute of Criminalistics, the Fire Department, the Municipal Civil Defense, AES Eletropaulo and the City Hall itself.

In early 2014, the Memorial opened a new bidding process to repair the damage caused by the fire. The electronic reverse auction bidding, won by the company Teccon AQ (whose project value was around 750,000 reais), was expected to deliver the concrete restoration by March 2015. However, the company canceled the project since, after a technical analysis was carried out, the necessary scope was not provided for in the tender notice. The difference between the presented projects lay in the size of the scope, which included the concrete coating on the walls and vaults in the hall.

== Architectural complex ==
Panorama of the memorial

Built on a 84,482 m^{2} (909,360 sq ft) site, the architectural complex designed by Oscar Niemeyer for the Latin America Memorial is an important reference in the urban landscape of São Paulo. The original complex, composed of six main buildings, totals 25,210 m^{2} (271,400 sq ft) of built area and is divided into two parts: on one side are the Latin American Library, the Marta Traba Gallery (former restaurant) and the Salão de Atos, arranged along the Praça Cívica, entirely paved, without trees or gardens, intended for popular gatherings. Also located in the Praça Cívica are the Tourist Reception Center, nicknamed the "Queijinho" (Little Cheese), and the large concrete sculpture, also conceived by Niemeyer, depicting an open hand seven meters high, with the map of Latin America in bas-relief at its center, painted red, symbolizing dripping blood. On the other side are the Creativity Pavilion, the administration building and the Simón Bolívar Auditorium. Later, Niemeyer added the Latin American Parliament building. The two parts, divided by an avenue that cuts through the site lengthwise, are interconnected by a walkway.

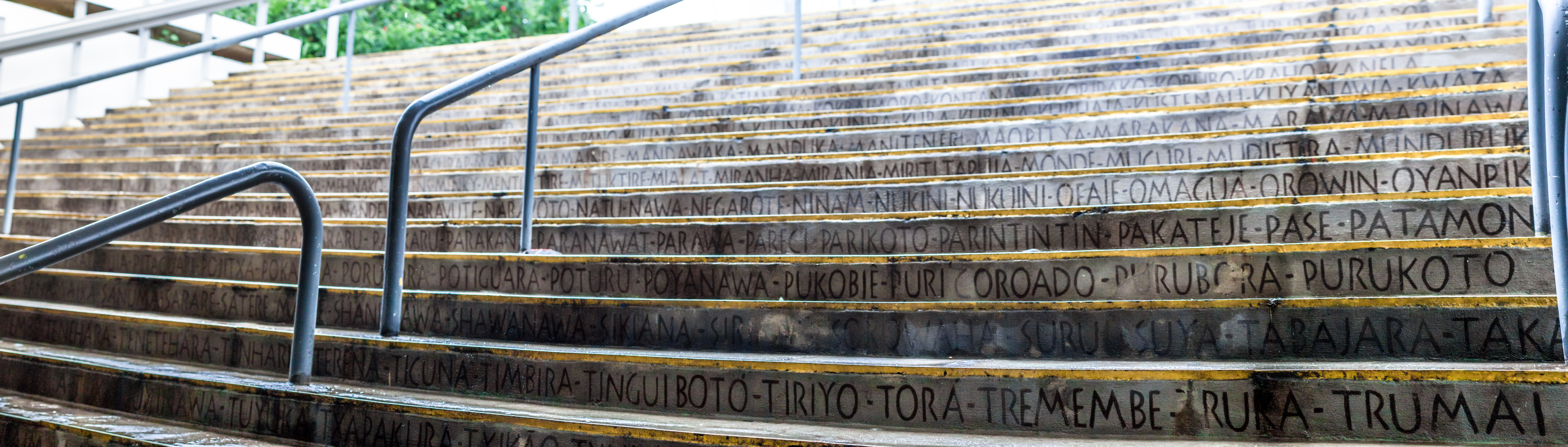
Names of indigenous tribes written on the entrance staircase

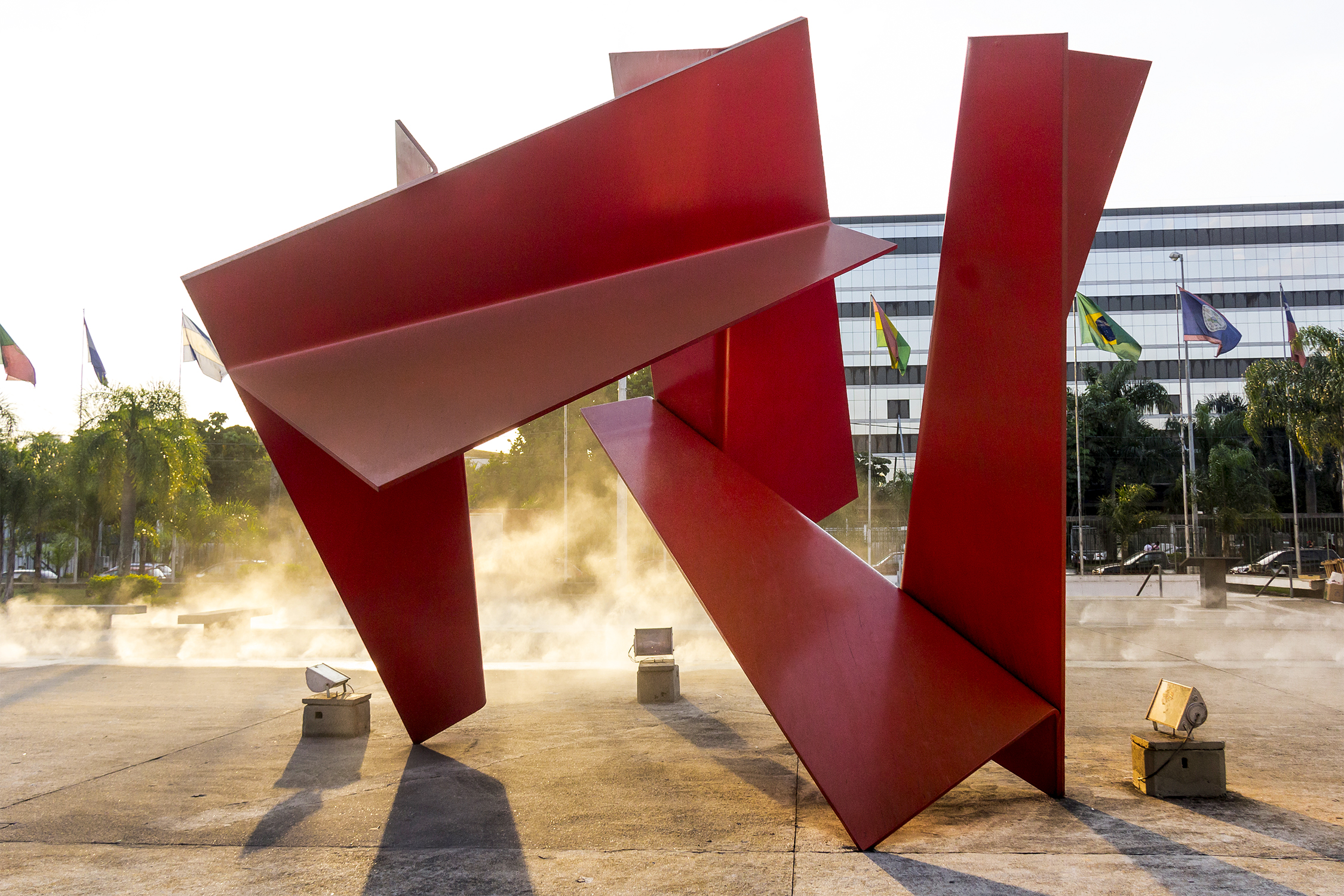
Grande Flor Tropical by Franz Weissmann

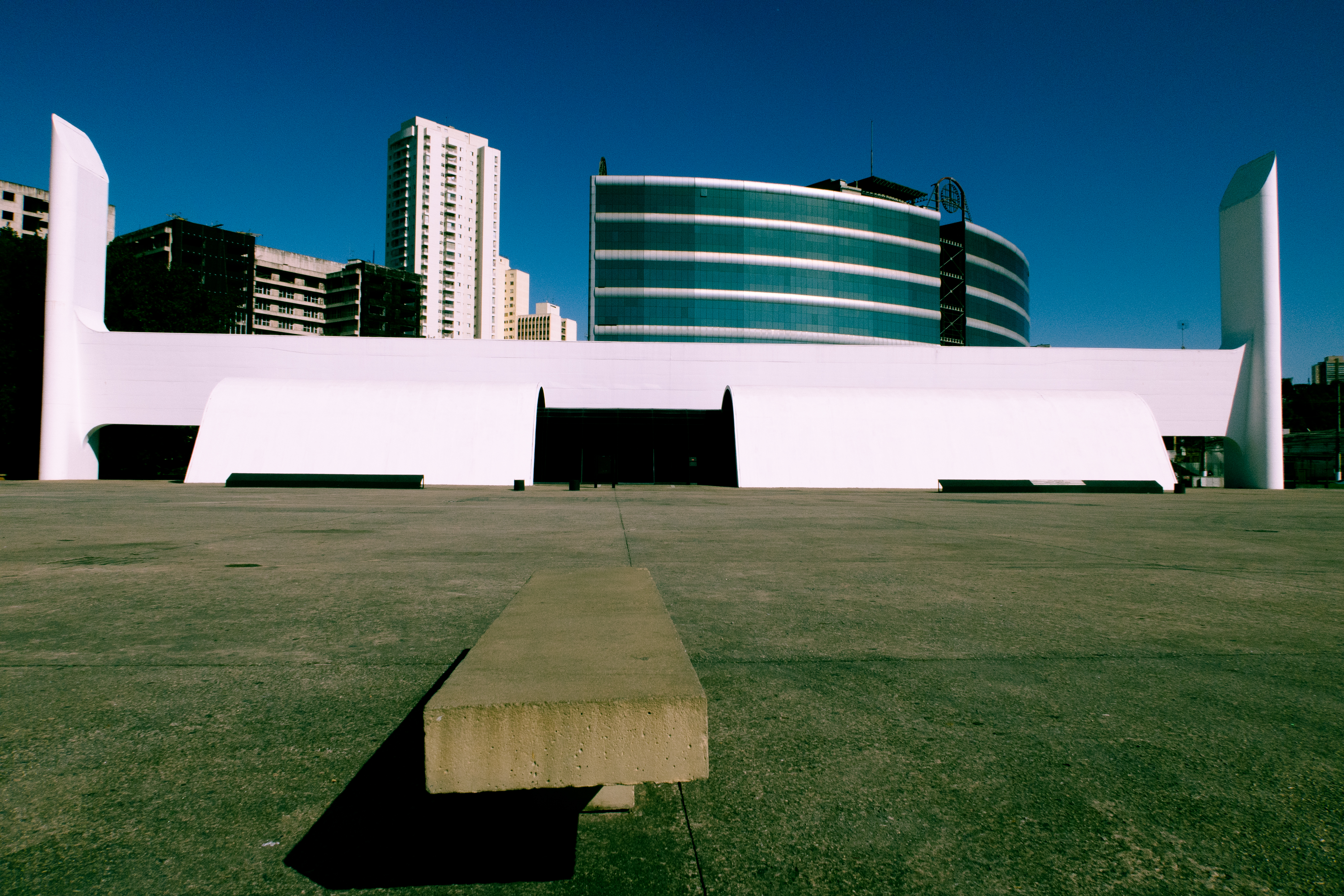
Victor Civita Latin American Library

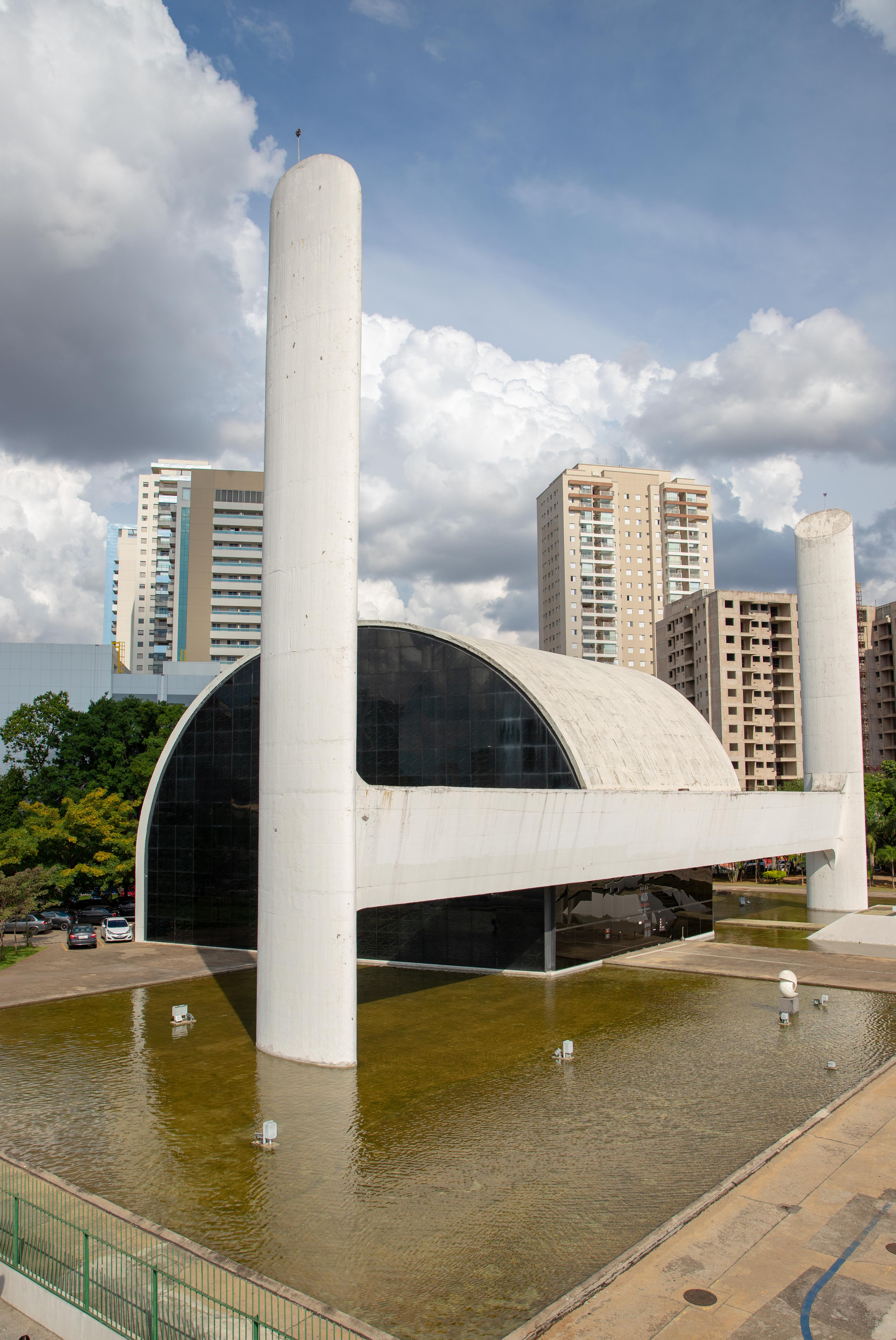
Salão de Atos

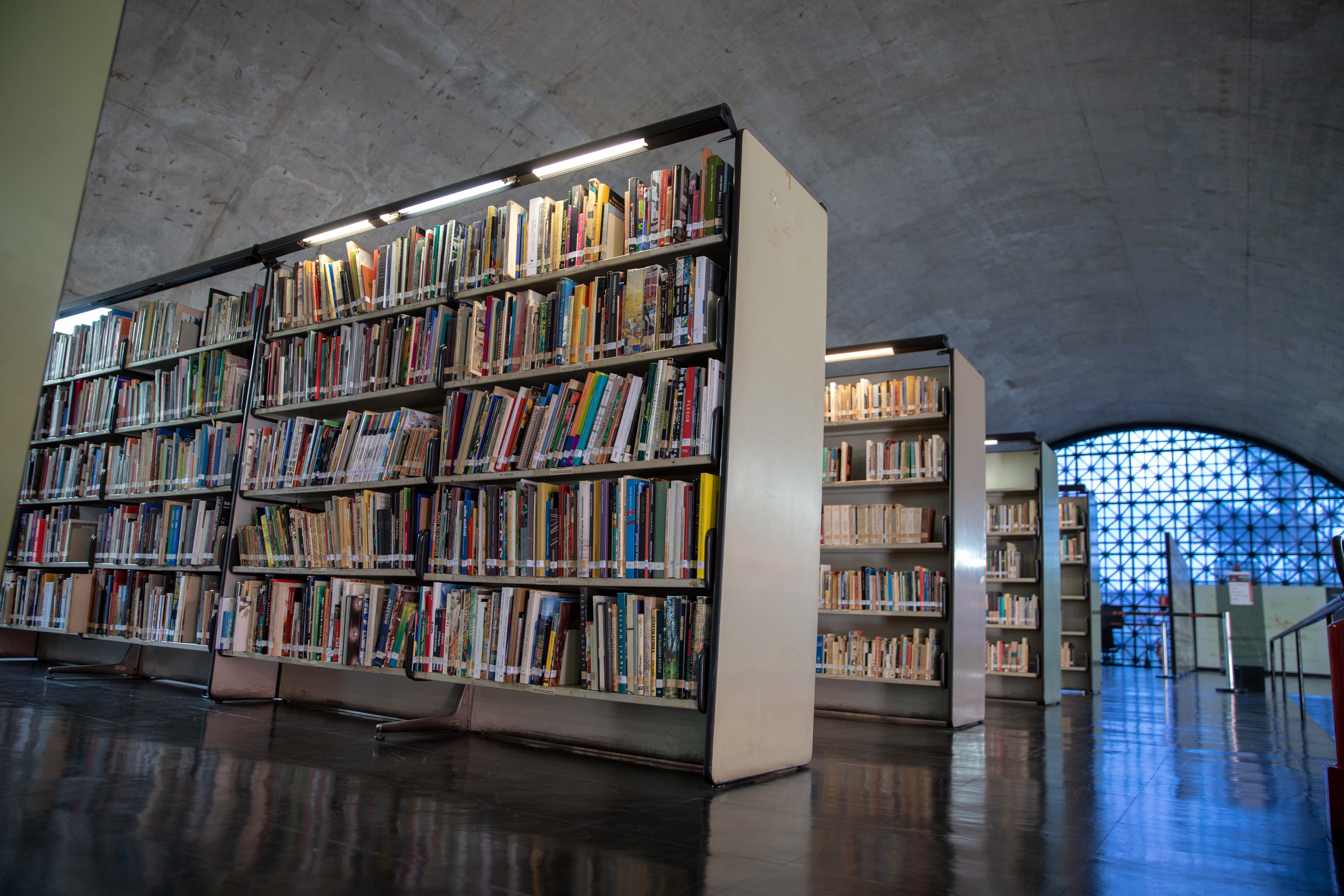
Inside the Victor Civita Latin American Library

The unity of the complex is ensured by the widespread use of the same plastic-structural resources, even if under different languages. The chromatic keynote is based on the use of white-painted concrete and black glass frames, as well as the unpainted concrete floor. The use of broad curved surfaces, with striking vertical counterpoints, and the large spans afforded by the beams of the library and the Salão de Atos also give consistency to the architectural approach. The monumentality of the memorial derives more from the generous setbacks, which allow one to grasp the relationships established among the components of the complex, than from the individual architecture of the buildings, which is modest in design, though bold from a structural standpoint.

In the Salão de Atos, the library and the auditorium, Niemeyer included vaults supported by large beams, a reinterpretation of the approach used at the Pampulha Church, in the 1940s, which he revisited with some structural modifications in the University of Constantine auditorium building, in Algiers (1968). The Salão de Atos is the focus of the Praça Cívica, taking on a prominent role in the complex, even though the building shares the same formal matrix as the library and the auditorium. It consists of a single vault supported on the beam, perpendicular to the ground. At the ends of the beam, two large columns mark the entrance, where the "parlatório" (speaking platform) is also located, positioned over the reflecting pool.

The library building is formed by two vaults supported on a 90 m (300 ft)-long central beam, which interacts with the Salão de Atos. The vault with the smaller radius marks the entrance to the building and is clad in black glass rather than concrete. The supports located outside the building, made up of the two tall columns that join the beam, allow an open interior and ensure the structure "light" appearance.

The auditorium is the largest and most elaborated building of the complex. It is equipped with two seating areas holding 1,600 seats, designed for artistic performances and hosting conferences and conventions. Its main spaces (foyer, seats and stage) are formed by a series of three successive vaults, two of which are supported on a large concrete beam. On either side of the building, two neutral, semi-underground and visually isolated parallelepiped volumes serve as annexes, providing support areas for artists and conference attendees.

The restaurant, turned into an art gallery later on, is a building in the shape of a shallow cylinder, raised half a level above the ground, with a roof supported by a single central support. This way, the interior is free of any physical and visual interference, allowing the visitor to see all the exhibited works simultaneously.

The design of the Creativity Pavilion is more conventional, in the shape of a curved bar, serving as a screen for the railway lines that of the Barra Funda Terminal. It has a large eave, running along the space between the auditorium and the Parlatino, taking on the role of a shaded shelter for the public. The succession of porticoes resulting from this eave creates a sense of rhythm to the perspective and different possibilities for visual framing of the architectural complex.

The administration building, located off the path marked by the walkway, is different from the complex. It does not have unrestricted-access and possesses a rather rational conception, compared to the sinuous forms of the other buildings. It is composed of a large suspended parallelepiped block, supported on four pillars hidden in the entrance hall on the ground floor, creating the illusion that it is supported solely by the roof beam.

The Parlatino (Latin American Parliament) building, like the restaurant, constitutes a counterpoint to the vaults of the Memorial. It is composed of a large cylindrical volume, taking on a prominent place from the perspective of visitors arriving at the esplanade from the walkway.

== Facilities and spaces ==
=== Sculptures ===
Hand

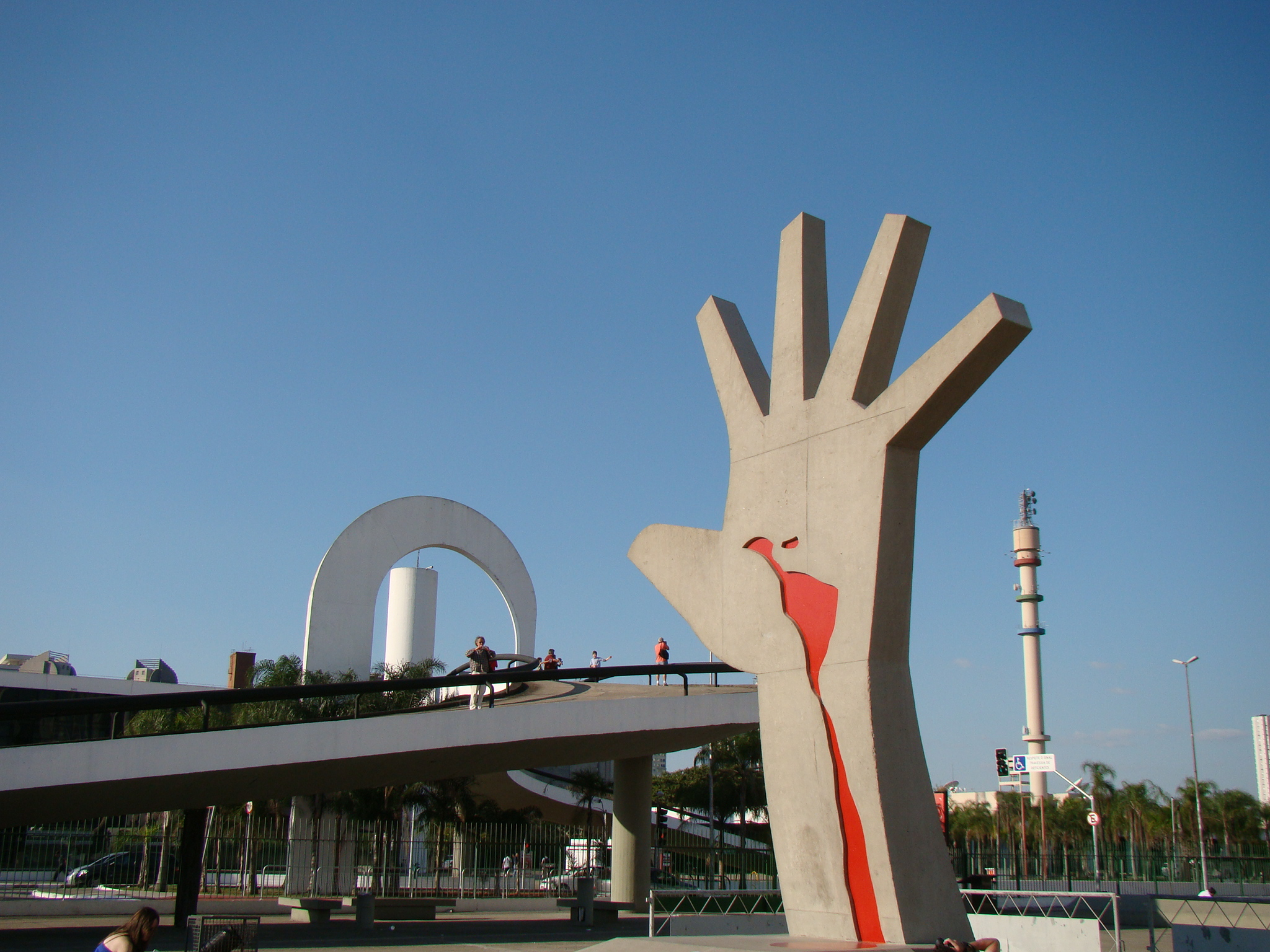
The sculpture Mão, by Oscar Niemeyer

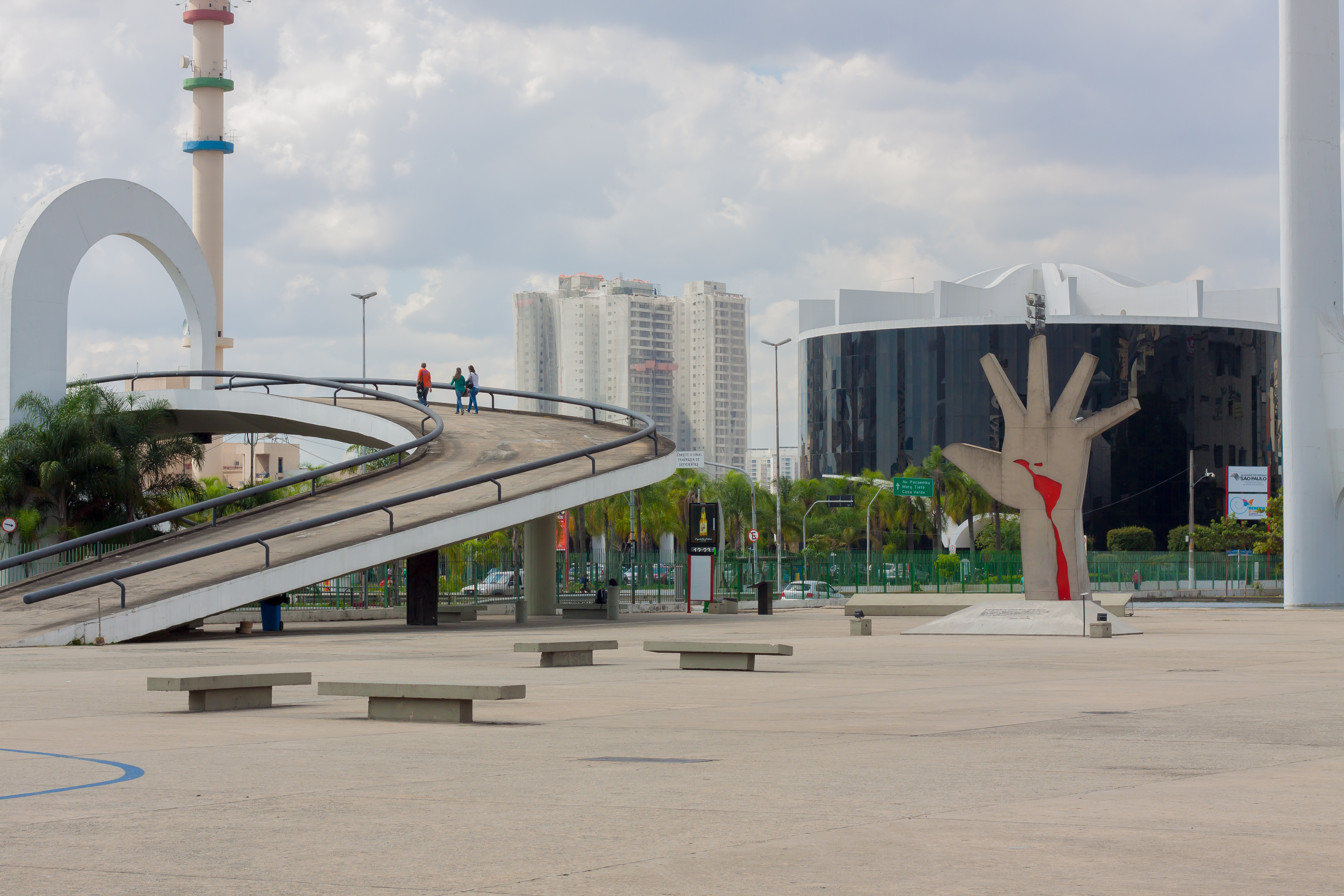
Praça Cívica

Those who arrive through the metro entrance, at Gate 1, soon see Mão, a sculpture by Oscar Niemeyer. The sculpture represents a hand with the map of Latin America as if in blood on its palm. It is an emblem of the continent, its colonization and struggle for its identity, cultural, political and socioeconomic autonomy. The sculpture is in exposed concrete, with bas-relief painted in synthetic enamel; it is seven meters high and is located in the Praça Cívica.

=== Praça Cívica ===
The Praça Cívica, also known as the Praça do Sol (Sun Plaza), is a large open and entirely paved area, joining the buildings of the Latin American Library, the Salão de Atos and the Marta Traba Gallery, intended to host several cultural events, such as typical festivals of Latin American countries and Brazilian regions, concerts, popular shows, workshops, etc. It has an area of 12,000 m^{2} (130,000 sq ft) and space for up to 15,000 people. Also located in the plaza are the Tourist Reception Center and some works of art, notably the sculpture Mão, by Niemeyer, in reinforced concrete and seven meters high, a symbol of the complex and an urban landmark of the city. The plaza is interconnected with the open space located on the other side of the Auro Soares de Moura Andrade Avenue by means of a walkway. This second space was named the Praça da Sombra (Shade Plaza), on account of the 160 queen palms found there. There is a green area of approximately 16,000 m^{2} (170,000 sq ft) distributed behind the facilities, alongside the parking lots and in the area adjoining the walls.

=== Marta Traba Gallery of Latin American Art ===
The Marta Traba Gallery is an exhibition space dedicated to the dissemination of Latin American art and to cultural exchange among the artists of the continent. It is the only museological space entirely dedicated to Latin American art in Brazil. The building is circular and of approximately 1,000 m^{2} (11,000 sq ft), originally designed for a restaurant. It is supported by a single central column and surrounded by panels, allowing visitors an uninterrupted view of the exhibition area. The gallery has two exhibition rooms, equipped with climate control and humidity and lighting control equipment, in addition to a technical reserve. It promotes short and medium-term exhibitions of emerging and established artists.

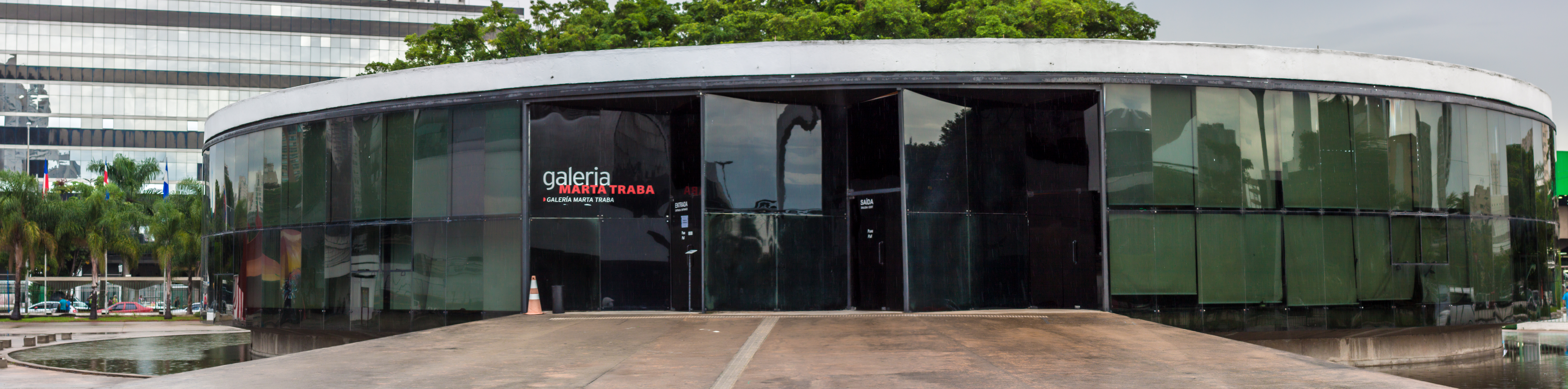
Marta Traba Gallery

== Events, exhibitions and festivals ==
The Latin America Memorial hosts the most varied events, exhibitions and festivals which, most of the time, are free events involving culture, gastronomy and entertainment. Some of them were: the exhibition "A Turma do Chaves" (2016); the Ice Cream Festival (2016); the 1st Churros Festival (2016); the exhibition "Castelo Rá-Tim-Bum" (2017); a show by the band "Ultraje a Rigor" (2015); and the Latin American Gastronomic Fair (2015).

One of the main types of event that the venue hosts are gastronomic ones. Festivals of Churros, Ice Cream, Fish and Shrimp, Japanese food and even little chocolate discs draw the attention of the public, which longs for them.

== See also ==
- Cultural Complex of the Republic
- Ibirapuera Park
- Museu Paulista
- Museum of the Portuguese Language
- MALBA
- Latin American art
- List of Oscar Niemeyer works
