= Rafael Mascarenhas case =

2010 accident in Rio de Janeiro, Brazil

- Location: Rio de Janeiro, Brazil
- Date: 20 July 2010
- Attack type: accident, murder
- Deaths: 1
- Victim: Rafael Mascarenhas
- Perpetrators: Rafael Bussamra, Gabriel Henrique de Sousa Ribeiro, Roberto Bussamra, Guilherme Bussamra
- Inquiry: police inquiry

The Rafael Mascarenhas case refers to the accident that resulted in the murder of student and musician Rafael Mascarenhas on 20 July 2010. Son of actress Cissa Guimarães, he was run over in Gávea inside the tunnel, now called Túnel Acústico Rafael Mascarenhas, which was closed for maintenance, but there was no maintenance on that day and there were no signs from CET-Rio that the Tunnel would be closed. According to CET-Rio, the tunnel was closed only at the entrance to Favela da Rocinha, inside the Tunnel a U-turn was made through which two cars entered and one of them hit Rafael at a speed of approximately 100 km/h according to the expertise. The young man was skateboarding with two friends, in a place where the practice of the sport was also not allowed.

== The victim ==
Rafael Mascarenhas
- Born: Rafael Guimarães Mascarenhas; 24 September 1991; Rio de Janeiro, Brazil
- Died: 20 July 2010 (aged 18); Rio de Janeiro, Brazil
- Cause of death: hit and run
- Occupation: musician student
- Known for: participant of the reality show "Geleia do Rock" and tragic death by running over
- Parents: Raul Mascarenhas (father); Cissa Guimarães (mother)

Rafael Guimarães Mascarenhas (Rio de Janeiro, 24 September 1991 – Rio de Janeiro, 20 July 2010) was 18 years old and was a musician and student. He was the youngest of the three children of actress Cissa Guimarães, the only one from her relationship with saxophonist Raul Mascarenhas. The young man was also the father's brother of Mariana Belém, the only daughter of singer Fafá de Belém. Rafael was a guitarist and backing vocalist for The Good Fellas, was one of the twelve remaining participants of the reality show Geleia do Rock on the cable channel Multishow, was studying Civil Engineering at the Pontifical Catholic University of Rio de Janeiro (PUC-Rio), but was in the process of transferring to the Architecture course and was about to leave for Europe, where he would take a music course. The young man died on the same day the reality show was shown and there was no presentation of the program on the day, just a statement in honor of the musician, made by the presenter, Beto Lee.

His body was laid to rest at the Carmo Memorial Vertical Cemetery, in Caju neighborhood, during the entire Wednesday following his death. Among the friends who attended the wake were Hélio de la Peña, Miguel Falabella, Cláudia Jimenez, Heloísa Périssé, Diogo Vilela, Adriana Esteves, Camila Morgado, Marco Nanini, Susana Vieira, Maitê Proença, Sônia Braga, Lenine, Raul Gazolla, Rosamaria Murtinho, Nuno Leal Maia, Alexandre Borges and Lúcia Veríssimo. The cremation ceremony took place the following day at the São Francisco Xavier Cemetery and Crematorium.

On 27 July 2010, a mass was held on the seventh day of his death at Nossa Senhora da Paz Church, in Ipanema. In addition to the boy's relatives, Lúcio Mauro, Sílvia Pfeifer, Lília Cabral, Maitê Proença, Carolina Dieckmann, Ney Latorraca, among others, attended the ceremony.

On 29 July 2010, a tribute was paid to the musician in the tunnel where he was run over. Family members and friends of the musician attended the event. Attendees sang and skated, as well as graffitied messages of love and peace on the tunnel wall. The young man's mother, Cissa, wrote the phrase "Thank you Rafael!". The young man's father played saxophone with the band The Good Fellas, in which Rafael was lead singer and guitarist.

On the one year anniversary of the young man's death, a concert was held in his honor at the Hipódromo Up nightclub, in Gávea. The main attraction of the night was the band “Os Rafael” formed by former members of the band in which young Rafael played. The musicians gathered especially for this performance. The event was held by the musician's mother and was attended by family members such as the brothers João Velho and Camila, and the father, Raul Mascarenhas, as well as several friends such as Caetano Veloso, Guta Stresser, Patrycia Travassos, Giuseppe Oristanio, Eduardo Dussek, Dado Villa-Lobos, Cynthia Howlett and Alexandra Richter among others. On the morning of the same day, the family gathered for a mass celebrated for a few people, at the convent of Clarissas, in Gávea. Before that, during the early hours of the 20th, the actress went, with friends, to the place where the car ran over Rafael, where she laid flowers.

== The case ==
=== Run over ===
In the early hours of Tuesday, 20 July 2010, Rafael and two friends (João Pedro Gonçalves and Luiz Quinderé) were skateboarding in the Acoustic Tunnel, an extension of the Zuzu Angel Tunnel, when Mascarenhas was run over. The track was closed for maintenance as usual, always between 1:10 am and 4:10 am. According to the investigations, two vehicles were heading towards São Conrado and would have returned using an emergency passage that was open. The two cars, a Honda Civic and a Fiat Siena, would have taken advantage of the track ban to bet on a crack. One of the vehicles, the Siena, hit Rafael Mascarenhas at high speed on the way down the tunnel. The driver of the car, Rafael de Souza Bussamra, left the scene without helping. After the incident, he was stopped by a police car, but was released after guaranteeing that he would pay bribes to the police.

According to firefighters, Rafael was taken while still alive to the Miguel Couto Hospital, in Leblon, in the South Zone of the city. The Municipal Secretary of Health of Rio declared that the young man arrived at the unit with polytrauma to the head, chest, arms and legs. He was operated on, but died around 8 am on the same day.

=== Police corruption ===
Images from the tunnel exit monitoring system showed the moment when the car of the driver, Rafael de Souza Bussamra, was approached by a Military Police car, which should have driven them to the police station, which did not happen. Later, after the images surfaced, the military police officers who were in the vehicle, Sergeant Marcello José Leal Martins and Corporal Marcelo de Souza Bigon, did not notice any signs that the car had been involved in an accident. However, the car arrived at the police station on the morning of 22 July, with half of the front destroyed. The vehicle had a broken windshield, dented hood, shattered headlights and was without a bumper. In testimony, Rafael Bussanra stated that the police charged him 10,000 reais to release the vehicle. According to the driver, the PMs would have asked him to get into the police car. They would have circulated through the Jardim Botânico neighborhood, passing by the headquarters of TV Globo, until the place marked to find the father of the driver, Roberto Bussamra. The duo would have asked Rafael's father for money, saying that they "did a good service" to the young man by removing the vehicle from the scene and cleaning up the scene of the hit-and-run. After paying R$ 1,000 to the police, the businessman would have refused to pay the rest of the combined money, an amount that the family claims to be R$ 10,000.

On 5 October, the two police officers who were assigned to the 23rd Military Police Battalion (Leblon) were expelled from the force. The decision came from the General Commander of the Military Police, Colonel Mário Sérgio Duarte, who claims to have considered the evidence that indicts the accused, including the pecuniary advantage. Months later, on December 16, the Rio court granted habeas corpus to the two PMs who were being held at the Military Police Prison Unit, in Benfica, in the North Zone of Rio.

=== Reconstruction ===
At dawn on 27 July, the reconstruction of the crime was carried out. The two friends who were skateboarding with Rafael at the time of the incident were summoned to participate: João Pedro Gonçalves and Luíz Quinderé; the two passengers in the Honda Civic that were supposed to compete in the street racing with the Fiat Siena that hit Rafael: the passenger, Gustavo Martins, and the driver Gabriel Fernandes; and the two passengers on the Siena: the hitchhiker, André Liberal, and the driver, Rafael de Souza Bussamra. The series of sprints, braking and measurements made by experts from the Carlos Éboli Institute generated data that helped the police understand what happened at the scene in the early hours of the accident. Based on the distance that Rafael Mascarenhas was thrown from the point where he was hit by the car, the experts calculated, based on the force necessary to throw the boy, the speed at which the vehicle was traveling.

João Velho and Tomás Velho, the victim's brothers, accompanied the investigation, which lasted about five hours.

=== Conclusion of the Inquiry ===
On 3 September, 44 days after the accident, the investigation into the death of Rafael Mascarenhas was concluded. The driver, Rafael Bussamra, was indicted for intentional homicide (when there is intent to kill) by the delegate of the 15th Police Station, Bárbara Lomba. According to the delegate, Bussamra was indicted for intentional homicide because there are indications that he was competing, at the time of the hit-and-run, with Gabriel Fernandes, who was driving the other car. Gabriel was indicted for intentional homicide. However, the Public Ministry did not accept the complaint against Gabriel Fernandes.

Rafael Bussamra was also indicted for the crimes of procedural fraud, for having taken the car to the garage after the hit-and-run in an attempt to cover up evidence; escape from the site and active corruption. Roberto Bussamra, father of the hit-and-run driver, was also accused of this last crime. The two admitted having paid R$1,000 to two military police officers to cover up the accident scene and avoid arrest in the act. The hit man's brother, Guilherme Bussamra, was also indicted for fraudprocedural, for having helped the father to take the car to the garage after the hit-and-run.

=== Punishment ===
==== First convictions: Gabriel Fernandes and Guilherme Bussamra ====
On 7 December 2010, the judge of the 2nd Jury Court of Rio, Paulo de Oliveira Lanzelotti Baldez, approved the criminal transaction of Gabriel Fernandes and Guilherme Bussamra, accused of, respectively, participation in a public road in an unauthorized automobile race and fraud pending police procedure. The criminal transaction is a legal instrument that fits crimes with a sentence of less than two years. Thus, the defendants were sentenced to pay basic food baskets. Defendant Gabriel Fernandes was sentenced to pay 10 minimum wages in cash or food baskets to the Associação Brasileira Beneficente de Reabilitação (ABBR) and had his driver's license suspended for a period of one year. Guilherme de Souza Bussamra (who helped hide the car of his brother who had been hit by a car in a workshop), will pay half the amount in cash or basic food baskets, to the same institution, since, according to his defense, he would be residing in São Paulo, which brought him expenses, making it difficult to pay the amount of 10 salaries. ABBR will choose the payment method to be received.
