= Leda Nagle =

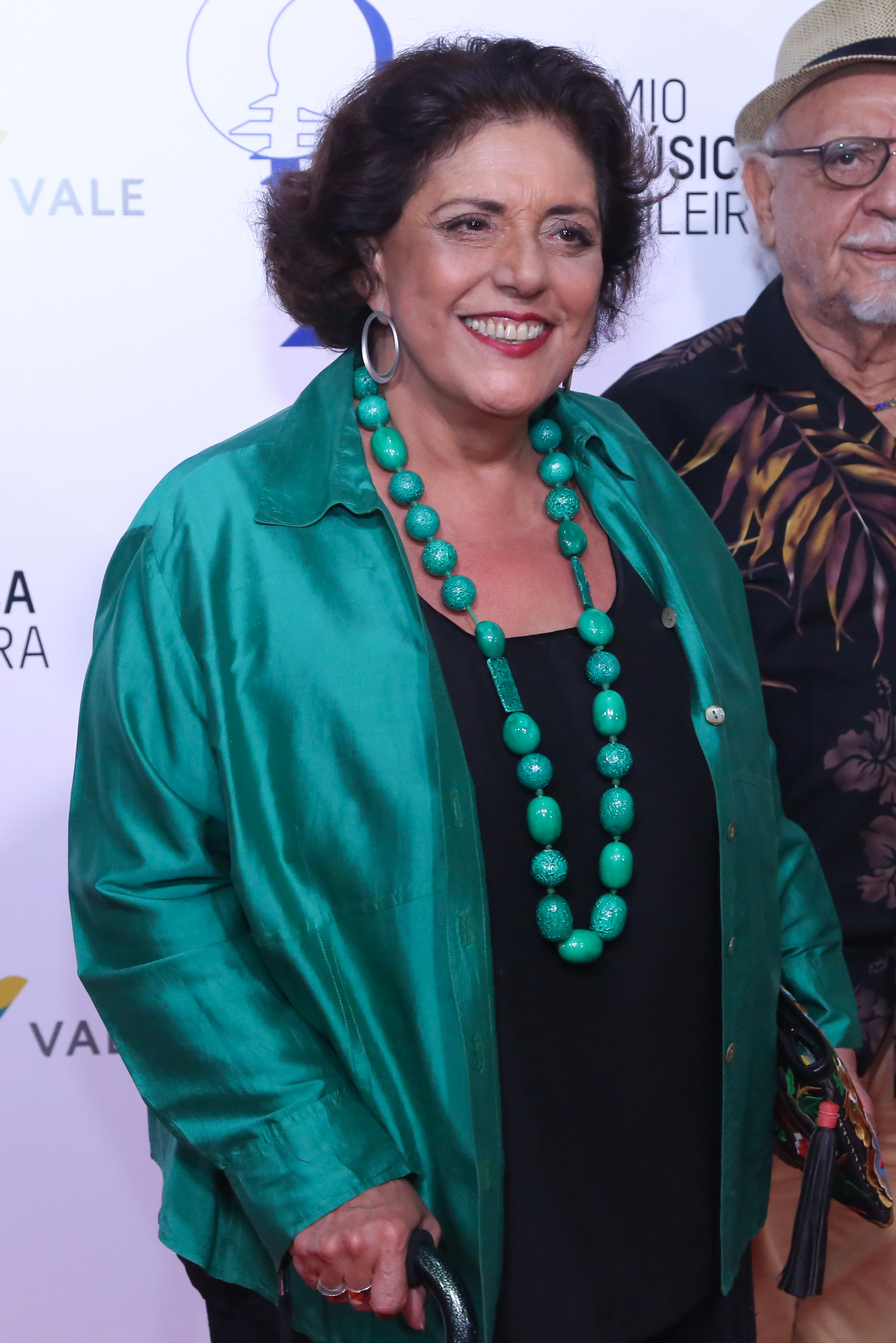
- Nagle at the 25th Prêmio da Música Brasileira, 2015
- Born: January 5, 1951 (age 75); Juiz de Fora, Minas Gerais, Brazil
- Education: Federal University of Juiz de Fora
- Occupations: journalist, writer, actress television presenter
- Employer(s): Rede Globo (1977-1989); Rede Manchete (1989-1993); SBT (1993-1995); TVE Brasil (1996-2007); TV Brasil (2007-2016)

Leda Maria Linhares Nagle (born 5 January 1951) is a Brazilian journalist, writer, actress and television presenter. She hosted the program Sem Censura at TV Brasil for over 20 years.

== Life and career ==
Nagle was born in Juiz de Fora. She moved to Rio de Janeiro after graduating in journalism at the Federal University of Juiz de Fora (UFJF), where she also had a brief stint as actress at Grupo Divulgação. She was the chief interviewer at TV Globo's Jornal Hoje; later she became anchor for the newsprogram. Nagle worked for TV Globo from 1977 to 1989, being the second longest-serving woman anchor for Jornal Hoje, only surpassed by Sandra Annemberg.

After leaving Globo, she went to Rede Manchete to present Jornal da Manchete afternoon edition. She also hosted a morning interview show at SBT in Rio de Janeiro, Agenda. The journalist also worked on radio and for the Ministry of Education, Unesco and other organizations' projects.

From 1994 to 2016 she presented the interview show Sem Censura, first at TVE Brasil, and later on TV Brasil.

In December 2016, Nagle was fired from TV Brasil. The decision was stated by Laerte Rímoli, president of Empresa Brasil de Comunicação (EBC). In March 2017, Nagle started a YouTube channel.

== Personal life ==
She is the mother of actor Duda Nagle and cousin of the writer and politician Fernando Gabeira.
