= Victor Civita Latin American Library =

Library

Coordinates: 23°31′31″S 46°40′16″W

Biblioteca Latino-Americana Victor Civita
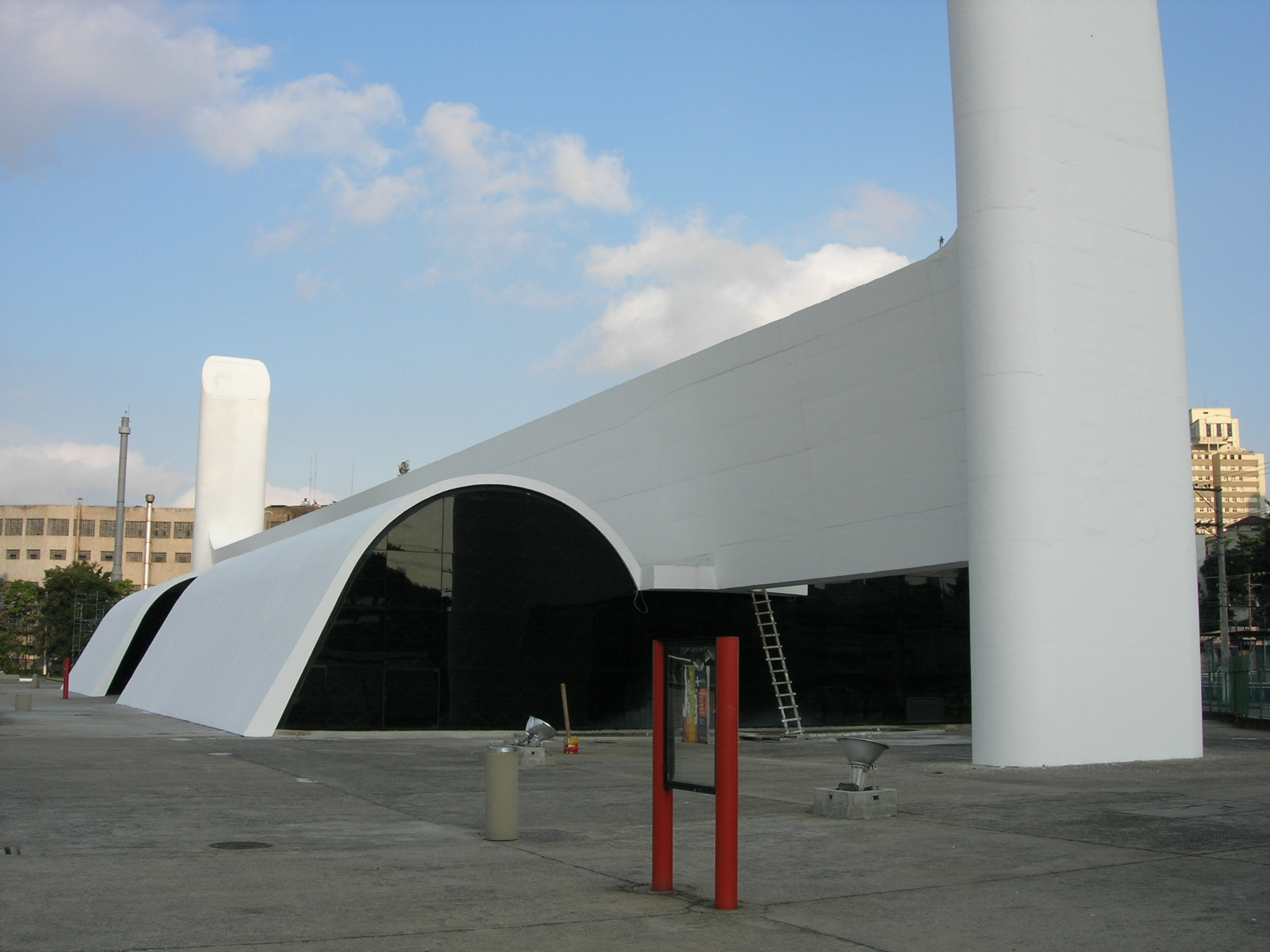
- Location: São Paulo, Brazil
- Established: 1989

Collection
- Size: 25,000 items

Access and use
- Population served: open to the public

Other information
- Website: bvmemorial.fapesp.br

The Victor Civita Latin American Library (in Portuguese Biblioteca Latino-Americana Victor Civita) is a public library which is part of the Latin America Memorial in the city of São Paulo, Brazil. The architectural complex, designed by Oscar Niemeyer, is a monument to the cultural, political, economic, and social integration of Latin America. Its cultural project was developed by anthropologist Darcy Ribeiro. It is a state public law foundation, with financial and administrative autonomy, linked to the State Secretariat of Culture.

The Memorial has a permanent collection of works of art, exhibited along the esplanade and in the internal spaces, and has a documentation center for Latin American popular art. The library has some 30,000 volumes, as well as a music and image section. The complex promotes exhibitions, lectures, debates, video sessions, theater, music and dance performances. It maintains the Brazilian Center for Latin American Studies, an organization that promotes academic research on Latin American subjects. It regularly publishes the magazine Nossa América and a variety of books. It served as the headquarters of the Latin American Parliament from 1989 to 2007 (currently located in Panama City).

== See also ==
- Mário de Andrade Library
- National Library of Brazil
- List of libraries in Brazil
