= TVE Brasil (Brazilian network) =

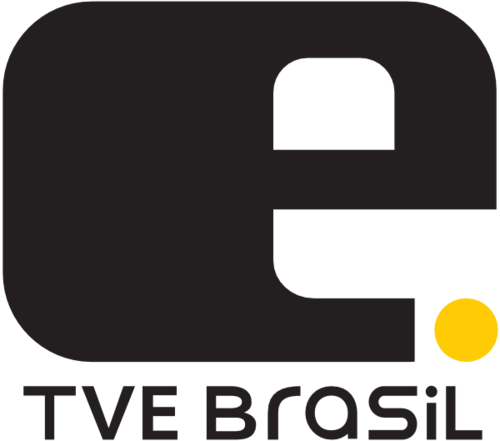
- Type: Free-to-air; Public broadcasting television network

Programming
- Picture format: 480i SDTV

Ownership
- Owner: Rede Públicas de Televisão

History
- Launched: November 5, 1975 by Ministry of Education
- Replaced: TV Brasil
- Closed: December 2, 2007
- Former names: TVE (1975–1997; 2001–2005)

TV Educativa do Rio de Janeiro (also called as TVE Brasil or TVE Rio de Janeiro) was a major Brazilian public TV network based in Rio de Janeiro, now defunct. It was founded in November 5, 1975 and ended on December 2, 2007, being replaced by TV Brasil, the Brazilian federal government channel.

TVE Brazil coordinated with TV Cultura and other regional public stations a nationwide public television network. For many years, TVE Brazil was fairly well watched amongst Brazilians, with some 16 million viewers reported. Until the beginning of the 1990, TVE Brazil was under the supervision of the Brazilian Ministry of Education. Until 2007, each medium was administered alone, there was no central body and every public station operated separately.

Without a well-defined communication policy, successive changes in the presidency and total lack of fiscal responsibility by the directors, the Roquette Pinto Foundation went into bankruptcy with debts over R$ 34 million (equivalent to US$ 6 million in 2021 amounts). The federal government radically changed the way they operated in 1998 and founded ACERP (Roquette Pinto Educational Communication Association), as a non-profit organization, taking its staff, assets and concessions. In 2007, it was replaced by the Empresa Brasil de Comunicação (EBC), which was linked to the Ministry of Social Communication of the Brazilian Government and ceased operations. The channel was replaced by TV Brasil.

== Former programming ==
- Arte com Sérgio Britto
- Atitude.com
- Atitude no Telhado
- Acervo MPB
- Caderno 2
- Código de Barras
- Comentário Geral
- Curta Brasil
- Cadernos de Cinema
- Espaço Público
- Esportvisão
- A Grande Música
- Jornal Visual
- Notícias do Rio
- Edição Nacional (partnered with Rede Manchete)
- Observatório da Imprensa
- Plugado
- Programa Especial
- Recorte Cultural
- Revista do Cinema Brasileiro
- Sem Censura
- Stadium
- Tribunal do Povo
- 100% Brasil
- Turma da Mônica
- Um Menino muito Maluquinho
- Clifford the Big Red Dog
- Jay Jay the Jet Plane
- Pluft o Fantasminha (1975)
- Curta Criança
- Sítio do Pica Pau Amarelo (1977)
- Patati Patatá
- Turma do Pererê
- Janela, Janelinha
- Turma do Lambe-Lambe
- Mundo BBC
- Tome Ciência
- Plantão da Língua Portuguesa (with TV Cultura)

Salto para o Futuro (with TV Escola, TV Cultura, SBT, TV Globo, Record, Rede Manchete, TV Gazeta, Band, MTV Brasil, CNT, RedeTV! and Rede Mulher)

- TVE Ecologia
