= Sem Censura =

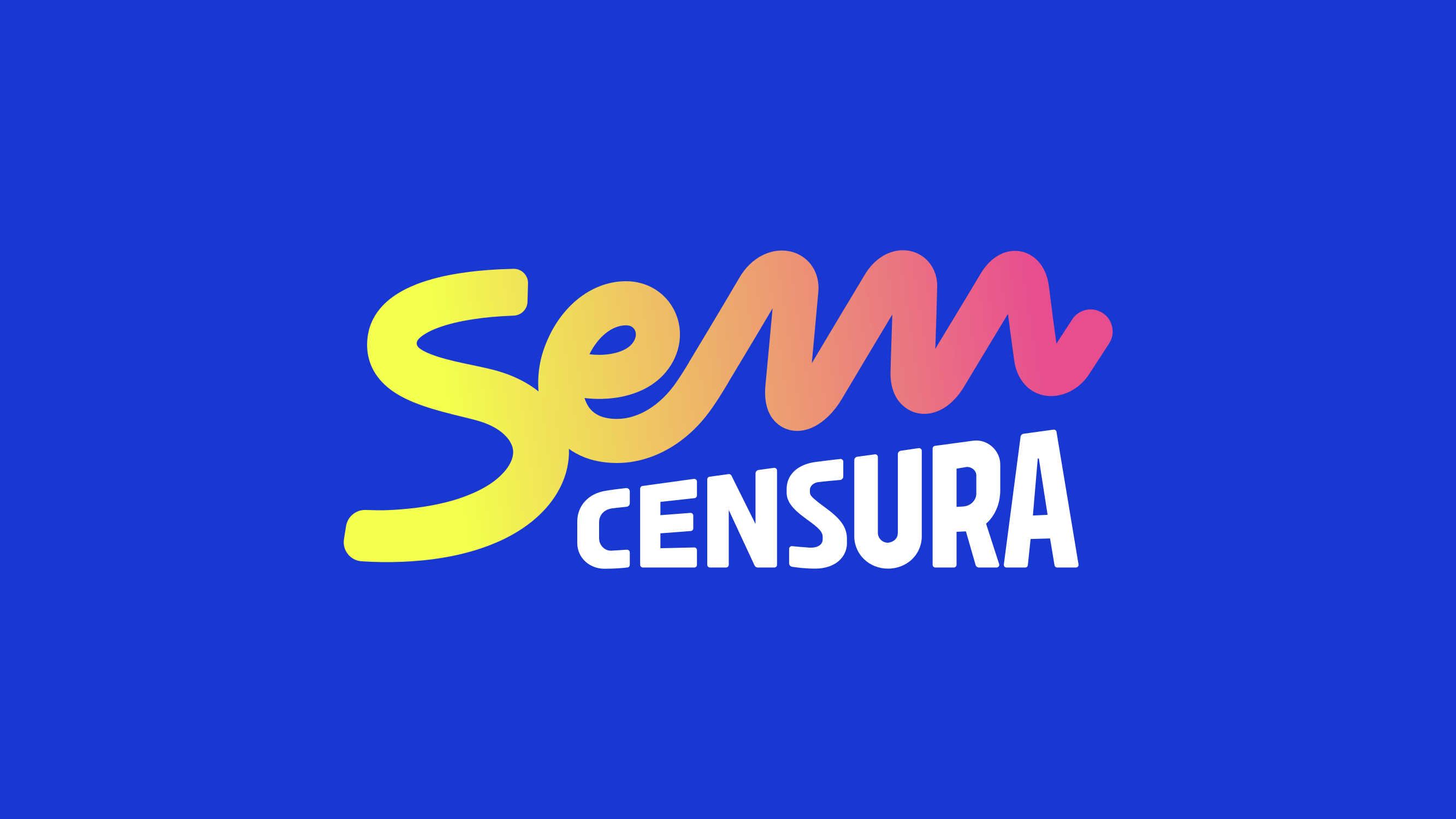
- Genre: Talk show
- Created by: Fernando Barbosa Lima
- Directed by: Bruno Barros
- Presented by: Cissa Guimarães
- Country of origin: Brazil
- Original language: Portuguese

Production
- Production location: Rio de Janeiro
- Running time: 120 minutes

Original release
- Network: TVE Brasil
- Release: July 1, 1985 – 2007
- Network: TV Brasil
- Release: 2007 – present

Related
- Roda Viva

Sem Censura (lit. 'Uncensored') is a Brazilian talk show broadcast by TV Brasil since July 1, 1985. It was conceived by journalist Fernando Barbosa Lima during a time when the country, after two decades of military dictatorship, was beginning its political opening. Currently, it is hosted by actress and presenter Cissa Guimarães, with Bruno Barros as general director.

== History ==
The talk show Sem Censura premiered on July 1, 1985 on Rio de Janeiro's TV Educativa, later incorporated into TV Brasil. Launched during Brazil's political reopening period, the program was initially hosted by journalist Tetê Muniz. Throughout its history, the show underwent several phases with different presenters, including Leda Nagle who hosted for twenty years.

In 2019, the broadcaster temporarily suspended the program, a decision that was reversed following public response. Between 2020 and 2024, the show experienced format and team changes, including relocation to Brasília and São Paulo for a period. Currently produced in Rio de Janeiro and hosted by Cissa Guimarães, it maintains the debate format that characterized its trajectory.

== Presenters ==
The program has been presented by actress and presenter Cissa Guimarães since 2024. Other presenters who have passed through the attraction were:

- Tetê Muniz (1985)
- Gilse Campos (1985)
- Lúcia Leme (1986–96)
- Cláudia Cruz (1986–89)
- Elizabeth Camarão (1991)
- Márcia Peltier (1991–93)
- Liliana Rodrigues (1991–96)
- Leda Nagle (1996–2016)
- Vera Barroso (2017–20)
- Bruno Barros (2017–20)
- Marina Machado (2020–23)
- Cissa Guimarães (2024–present)
