= Cissa Guimarães =

Brazilian television presenter and actress

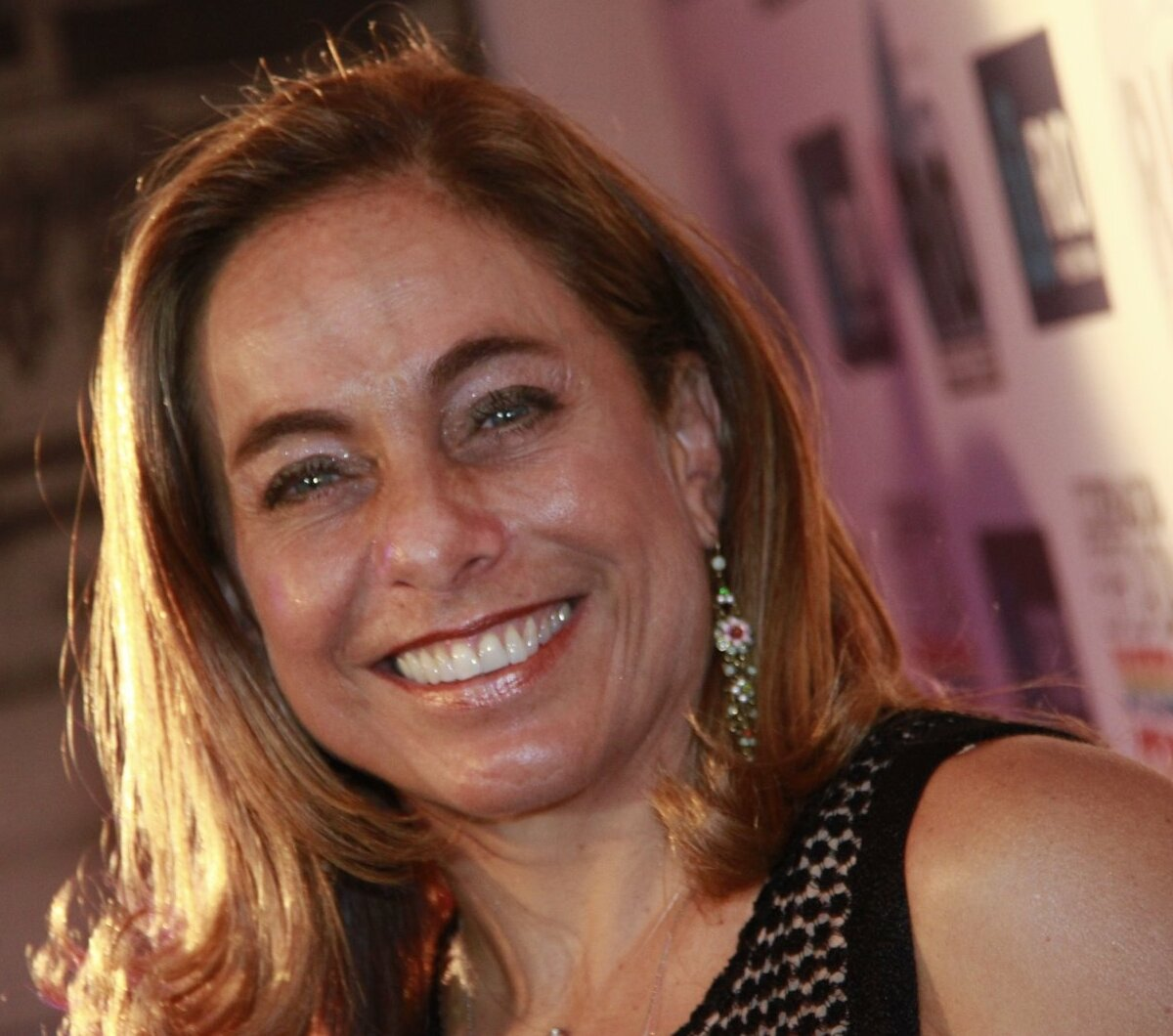
- Guimarães in 2013
- Born: Beatriz Gentil Pinheiro Guimarães; April 18, 1957 (age 68); Rio de Janeiro, Rio de Janeiro, Brazil
- Occupations: Actress, television presenter
- Spouse(s): Paulo César Pereio (1975-1990); Raul Mascarenhas (1990-1994); João Batista Figueira de Mello (1997-2003)
- Children: 3

Beatriz Gentil Pinheiro "Cissa" Guimarães (born April 18, 1957) is a Brazilian television presenter and actress.

== Biography ==
Guimarães began her artistic career in 1977, when she participated in the play "Dor de Amor" (Pain of Love). In television, she became better known as a host of the variety show Rede Globo Vídeo Show, where she stayed for fifteen years (between 1986 and 2001).

In 1994, she posed nude for Playboy Magazine. In 2005, she posed nude again at age 48, this time in the magazine Sexy.

In 2010, she premiered in the play "Doidas e Santas." On August 8, 2015, she became the host of the Saturday show É de Casa. In 2021, after more than 40 years, Cissa left TV Globo. In 2024, she was hired by TV Brasil to host the program Sem Censura.

== Personal life ==
Guimarães was married for 15 years, with actor Paulo César Pereio. With him they had two sons Tomás and actor João. After the separation, she married saxophonist Raul Mascarenhas, with whom she lived for 4 years, and with him she had a son Rafael (1991-2010). Her third marriage lasted 6 years, with physician João Baptista Figueira de Mello, from whom she had no children. She did not remarry after the split, eventually appearing in the media with a boyfriend.

She studied chemistry at the Federal University of Rio de Janeiro.

On July 20, 2010, Guimarães lost her son, Rafael Mascarenhas, 18, who was run over in a tunnel in Gávea, south of Rio de Janeiro. The tunnel was closed for maintenance, but there was a passage through which two cars entered the tunnel and one of them ended up running over Rafael, who was skateboarding with his two friends.

== Filmography ==
=== Television ===
==== As an actress ====
Year	Title	Function	Channel
1980 - 1981	Coração Alado	Carla	Rede Globo
1981 - 1982	Jogo da Vida	Eliana	Rede Globo
1982	Elas por Elas	Tereza Madalena	Rede Globo
1982	Final Feliz	Lucinha	Rede Globo
1985	Um Sonho a Mais	Amélia Bicudo	Rede Globo
1987	Direito de Amar	Paula Alves Barbosa	Rede Globo
1989	Top Model	Rose	Rede Globo
1990	Delegacia de Mulheres	Luli Saraiva	Rede Globo
1992	Perigosas Peruas	Zulmira (Zu)	Rede Globo
1997	Zazá	Cecília (Célia)	Rede Globo
1998	Malhação	Teresa	Rede Globo
1999	Vila Madalena	Dalva	Rede Globo
2001	Sítio do Picapau Amarelo	Cissa	Rede Globo
2001	O Clone	Clarisse	Rede Globo
2004	Malhação	Beatriz Soares da Costa	Rede Globo
2005	América	Nina	Rede Globo
2006	Lu	Cecília (Célia)	Rede Globo
2007	Toma Lá Dá Cá	Cleide	Rede Globo
2008	Casos e Acasos ^{Episode: O Desejo Escondido, o Cara Deprimido e o Livro Roubado}	Beth	Rede Globo
2009	Caminho das Índias	Ruth Marques	Rede Globo
2009	Xuxa Especial de Natal	Mamãe Noel	Rede Globo
2011	Morde & Assopra	Augusta de Oliveira	Rede Globo
2012 - 2013	Salve Jorge	Maitê Bittencourt	Rede Globo
2014	Alto Astral	Herself	Rede Globo
2020	Amor de Mãe	Herself	Rede Globo
2024	Benefits with Friends	Neide Martins	Disney+

==== As a presenter ====
Year	Title	Function	Channel
1986 - 2001	Vídeo Show	Reporter / Presenter	Rede Globo
1994	Prêmio TVZ	Presenter	Multishow
2000	Você Decide	Presenter	Rede Globo
2008	Festival de Verão de Salvador	Reporter	Rede Globo
2012 - 2015	Viver com Fé	Presenter	GNT
2014–2021	Mais Você	Event Presenter	Rede Globo
2015–2021	É de Casa	Presenter	Rede Globo
2016–2021	Criança Esperança	Presenter Mesão da Esperança	Rede Globo
2016–2021	Encontro com Fátima Bernardes	Event Presenter	Rede Globo
2024–present	Sem Censura	Presenter	TV Brasil

=== Film ===
Year	Film	Character
1978	Lady on the Bus	Wedding guest (credited as Cissa)
1982	Beijo na Boca	Rita
1982	Menino do Rio	Aninha
1982	Ao Sul do Meu Corpo	—N/a
1983	Bar Esperança	—N/a
2001	Minha Vida em Suas Mãos	Beth
2002	Histórias do Olhar	Madrasta
2005	Racing Stripes	Franny (Brazilian dubbing)

=== Theater ===
- 2010 - Doidas e Santas
