= Tribunal do Povo =

Tribunal do Povo (People's Court) was a Brazilian television program broadcast by TVE, in which two debaters supported their thesis, after evaluated by a jury of seven members. It has been made notorious by its releasing, with the confrontation of capitalism and socialism, supported by nobody else than Roberto Campos and Luís Carlos Prestes.

According to Fernando Barbosa Lima, who was the programme's creator, this show in prime time would be an alternative choice to the spectator instead of the traditional soap opera.

Known as the debate of the century The confrontation of both celebrities achieved high levels of audience, exciting all the society around this contest.
