= A Grande Música =

Defunct Brazilian music television show

- Genre: Music
- Country of origin: Brazil
- Original language: Portuguese

Original release
- Network: Televisão Educativa
- Release: 2001 – December 2007

A Grande Música was a Brazilian music television series aired on Televisão Educativa between 2001 and December 2007, when the channel ceased to exist. It was well-noted for appearances by renowned flamenco and classical musicians and concertos. The channel regular features performances by the likes of Orquestra Sinfônica Brasileira (OSB), Orquestra Petrobras Sinfônica and Cia. Bachiana Brasileira; groups such as Calíope, Quarteto Radamés Gnatalli and Quinteto Villa-Lobos and artists such as Antono Meneses, Cristina Ortiz, Nelson Freire Roberto de Regina, David Chew and Cristina Braga, among others.
