= Police inquiry (Brazil) =

The police inquiry in Brazil is an administrative police procedure created by imperial decree 4.824/1871 and provided for in the Brazilian Code of Criminal Procedure as a fundamental investigative procedure of the Brazilian judicial police (Brazil). It investigates (examines) a certain crime and precedes the criminal action, being commonly considered as pre-procedural, although it is part of the criminal process. The police inquiry is a written procedure presided over by the police authority, who is the police delegate. It consists of evidence of the authorship and materiality of the crime, which are commonly produced by the police authority and by the agents of the police authority (police investigators, criminal experts, police officers, police clerks, police papillary experts).

== Definition ==
The police inquiry is the procedure of judicial police aimed at establishing the real truth of an allegedly criminal fact. Its purpose is to gather the necessary elements (evidence) to investigate the commission of a criminal offense and its authorship (authorship and materiality). Provided for in articles 4 to 23 of the Code of Criminal Procedure, it is the formal instrument of investigations, comprising a set of diligences carried out by agents of the police authority and by the police authority itself (police delegates) to investigate the criminal act and discover its authorship or the atypicality or any cause excluding unlawfulness or culpability. In summary, it is the documentation of the diligences performed by the judicial police, arranged chronologically and filed with the records that document the investigations.

Once the police inquiry is initiated, it is the duty of the police authority to take certain measures capable of investigating the criminal offense. According to the subparagraphs of Article 6 of the Code of Criminal Procedure, these measures are as follows:

1. go to the scene, taking steps to preserve the state and condition of things until the arrival of the criminal experts;
2. seize the objects related to the fact, after they have been released by the criminal experts;
3. gather all the evidence that serves to clarify the fact and its circumstances;
4. hear the victim;
5. hear the accused, observing, where applicable, the provisions of Chapter III of Title VII of this Book, with the respective record being signed by two witnesses who have heard it being read;
6. conduct identification lineups and confrontations;
7. determine, if necessary, the carrying out of a body examination and any other expert examination;
8. order the identification of the accused through dactyloscopy, if possible, and attach to the records their background sheet;
9. investigate the previous life of the accused, from an individual, family and social point of view, their economic condition, their attitude and state of mind before and after the crime and during it, and any other elements that contribute to the assessment of their temperament and character.

There is no specific order to follow when carrying out the diligences, as the legal provision is merely exemplificative. These diligences are discretionary, that is, they depend on the peculiarities of the specific case. However, such discretion is not absolute, as there are diligences whose execution is mandatory, such as the examination of the body in offenses that leave traces (Article 158, Code of Criminal Procedure).

In addition to the police inquiry prepared by the judicial police, there are other modalities of inquiries of a criminal and civil nature, existing in the Brazilian legal system. The extrapolicial inquiries are those procedures not prepared by the judicial police, namely:

- the military police inquiry, chaired by military personnel with the aim of investigating exclusively military crimes;
- the judicial inquiry in bankruptcy cases, chaired by the judge, but no longer in existence due to changes in the bankruptcy law.
- the expulsion police inquiry, an administrative procedure with ample defense conducted by the Federal Police of Brazil aiming to gather evidence and information for the Minister of Justice of Brazil to decide whether to deport or not a foreigner who has committed a criminal offense on national territory.
- the civil inquiry, which aims to gather evidence for the proposition of a civil class action for damages caused to the public heritage, the environment, and other collective and diffuse interests, chaired by a member of the Public Prosecutor's Office in Brazil.

Its purpose is to provide the prosecution with the necessary elements, through the investigative elements it contains, to form the suspect of the crime, the just cause required by that body to file the criminal action. Together with other probative elements, it will guide the prosecution in the collection of evidence that will take place during the procedural instruction.

The police inquiry has an administrative nature. Its characteristics are: being written (Article 9 of the Code of Criminal Procedure); confidential, with the exception of judges, members of the Public Prosecutor's Office, and lawyers (Binding Precedent No. 14), being an exception to the principle of publicity (Article 20 of the Code of Criminal Procedure) and inquisitorial, as there is no contradiction and full defense in it; not available (Article 17), since it is not up to the police authority to determine, on its own, the termination of the police inquiry. It is true that Article 5, LV of the Federal Constitution provides that "litigants, in judicial or administrative proceedings, and the accused in general, shall be guaranteed the contradictory and full defense, with the means and resources inherent to them." Nevertheless, it cannot be said that the inquiry is contradictory. First, because in the inquiry there is no accused person; second, because it is not a process, but a procedure. The expression "administrative process" has another meaning, also because in the inquiry there is no litigant, and the Constitution speaks of "litigants in judicial or administrative proceedings."

The lawyer is entitled to consult the records, but is not allowed to attend the acts.

Another purpose of the police inquiry is to provide probative elements to the judge. The judge will assess the evidence, even those collected without judicial contradiction. Also, in order to allow the decree of preventive detention, whether temporary, during the police inquiry, in accordance with Law No. 7.960, of December 21, 1989, or preventive detention, during the inquiry or the criminal instruction, in accordance with Article 312 of the Code of Criminal Procedure.

=== Garantist (modern) Definition of the Police Inquiry ===
This current, led by professor Henrique Hoffmann, based on the guarantee perspective of the protection of fundamental rights prescribed by the 1988 Federal Constitution, in line with Law 12.830/2013, defines the Police Inquiry as an administrative process chaired by the natural police delegate, investigative, informative, and probative, indispensable, preparatory, and preservative. The arguments for these characteristics are:

- Administrative process and not just a procedure: although it does not involve a formal dispute with the prosecution, it is considered an administrative process sui generis, considering the possibility of restrictions on the fundamental rights of the suspect linked to the prognosis and diagnosis made by the police delegate in this pre-indictment phase;
- Presided over by the natural police delegate: in light of Article 2, §§4 and 5 of Law 12.830/2013, the delegate in charge of specific police inquiry acts can only be the one defined by pre-established rules, prohibiting arbitrary avocation and redistribution.
- Investigative and not inquisitorial: the definition of inquisitorial is limited to arbitrary interrogation, which disregards the free will and the right to silence of the suspect. This term is incompatible with the contemporary police inquiry subject to constitutional guidelines. The term investigative is more appropriate as it incorporates investigation, examination, selection, counting, and other terms that better suit the investigative activity of this process;
- Informative and probative: in addition to the informative nature concerning the elements of information that require subsequent judicial validation (contradiction and full defense), there are the evidence produced in this pre-indictment phase that are irreproducible and anticipated;
- Indispensable: Indispensability is the rule, dispensability is the exception. The Code of Criminal Procedure and jurisprudence clearly establish that the police inquiry will only be dispensable when the indictment or complaint contains sufficient elements for the indictment, which in practice rarely occurs.
- Preservative and preparatory, not just preparatory: The police inquiry is not exclusively committed to preparing the accusatory document, it goes much further, serving as a filter to prevent unfounded accusations and baseless imputations. In addition, the probative and informative elements serve both the prosecution and the defense since the investigation's primary purpose is to seek the truth. The judicial police, as an impartial body, has no hierarchical link with the Public Prosecutor's Office but a functional progression.

== Cases where the Police Inquiry is Unnecessary ==
Considering that "the police inquiry is an administrative procedure conducted by the judicial police and aimed at the preliminary gathering of evidence to investigate the commission of a criminal offense and its authorship," it can be concluded that in cases where the holder of the criminal action – the Public Prosecutor's Office or the victim – has, regardless of the intervention of the judicial police, sufficient elements to file the accusatory document, the police inquiry is dispensable.

Thus, the cases in which the police inquiry is dispensable, as provided for in the Code of Criminal Procedure, are as follows:

1. Article 12: "The police inquiry shall accompany the indictment or complaint whenever it serves as the basis for either."

From the content of the article, it can be accurately concluded that in cases where the inquiry does not serve as the basis for the indictment or complaint, the inquiry is unnecessary for the investigative procedure.

2. Article 27: "Any person may initiate action by the Public Prosecutor's Office, in cases where public prosecution is possible, by providing written information about the fact and its authorship and indicating the time, place, and elements of conviction."

Therefore, if a person provides the Public Prosecutor's Office with sufficient information to file the indictment, the police inquiry becomes dispensable.

3. Article 39, § 5: "The Public Prosecutor's Office shall dispense with the police inquiry if the representation includes elements that enable it to initiate criminal proceedings and, in this case, shall file the indictment within 15 (fifteen) days."

The clarity of the article indicates that if the representation contains sufficient elements for the filing of an indictment, the Public Prosecutor's Office can dispense with the police inquiry.

4. Article 46, § 1: "When the Public Prosecutor's Office dispenses with the police inquiry, the deadline for filing the indictment shall be counted from the date on which the information or the representation is received."

The aforementioned article regulates the deadline within which the indictment must be filed in cases where the police inquiry is dispensed with due to the sufficiency of the elements contained in the information provided by a person or in the representation. The deadline, as stated in the article, is fifteen days.

The Federal Constitution of the Federative Republic of Brazil also provides, in paragraph 3 of Article 58, another case of dispensability of the police inquiry. In this regard, its text is highlighted as follows:

The Parliamentary Inquiry Commission, which will have investigative powers similar to judicial authorities, in addition to others provided for in the internal regulations of their respective houses, shall be created by the Chamber of Deputies of Brazil and the Federal Senate of Brazil, jointly or separately, upon request by one-third of their members, for the investigation of a specific fact and for a fixed period, and their conclusions, if applicable, shall be forwarded to the Public Prosecutor's Office for the promotion of civil or criminal liability of the offenders.

The content of the above-mentioned paragraph indicates that in cases where parliamentary investigative committees are involved, they have the power of investigation and may subsequently refer the matter to the public prosecutor's office, without the need for a police investigation to gather information to support the accusatory document.

Law No. 9.099/95, in its articles 69 and 77, "caput" and paragraph 1, also provides for cases where a police investigation is dispensable, as follows:

Article 69. The police authority that becomes aware of an occurrence shall draw up a detailed record and immediately forward it to the Juvenile Court, along with the offender and the victim, taking the necessary steps to request any necessary expert examinations.

Article 77. In public criminal actions, when there is no imposition of penalty due to the absence of the perpetrator or the non-occurrence of the situation provided for in Article 76 of this law, the Public Prosecutor's Office shall immediately submit an oral indictment to the judge, if there is no need for essential proceedings. § 1. For the submission of the indictment, which shall be prepared based on the occurrence report referred to in Article 69 of this Law, dispensing with the police investigation, there shall be no need for a body examination when the materiality of the crime is evidenced by a medical report or equivalent evidence.

It is therefore concluded that in the Special Criminal Courts, governed by Law No. 9.099/95, the police investigation is dispensable in favor of the detailed record. In this regard, the following lesson deserves attention:

The police authority must draw up a detailed record of the occurrence, that is, prepare a report of the fact considered a crime of minor offensive potential. This occurrence report does not require formalistic requirements, but it must contain the necessary elements to demonstrate the existence of a criminal offense, its circumstances, and authorship, summarizing what has come to the knowledge of the authority through the statements of the victim, the alleged perpetrator, witnesses, police officers, etc. In short, the traditional questions must be answered: Who? By what means? What? Why? Where? And when? There is nothing to prevent the occurrence report from being prepared by filling in the blanks of printed forms, which, incidentally, facilitates its preparation and prevents omissions. The police authority may and should include in the records, always in summary form, any different versions provided by the perpetrator of the act, the victim, and also witnesses. It should also include a description of any summary investigations and actions already carried out (seizure of instruments, proceeds of crime, and other assets), as well as a sketch of the crime scene, especially in traffic offenses, the notification of expert examinations, etc. Documents related to the occurrence, data on the offender's background for the purposes of Article 76, § 2, I and II, etc., must be attached to the record. Thus, unlike the boletim de ocorrência (occurrence report), the detailed record, along with its accompanying elements, constitutes the actual informatio delicti, that is, the necessary instrument intended to provide the elements for the exercise of the right of action by the prosecuting authority (the Public Prosecutor's Office in public criminal cases and the victim in private criminal cases).

== Inquisitorial Nature of the Police Investigation ==
Doctrine states that the police investigation has an inquisitorial nature, characterized as an investigative process in which the right to adversarial proceedings does not apply. Although adversarial proceedings are guaranteed as an explicit right in the Federal Constitution, according to Article 5, item LV of the Brazilian Constitution of 1988, it cannot be applied to the investigation, as it is not a judicial process and the accused party is not involved. "The purpose of the investigation is not punitive but investigative, to provide reliable information that allows the prosecuting authority to exercise the jus persequendi in judicio."

According to Capez, "the procedure in which prosecutorial activities are concentrated in the hands of a single authority is characterized as inquisitorial, which means that this authority does not require anyone's provocation to act and can and should act on its own initiative, carrying out the necessary activities to clarify the crime and its authorship with discretion." Capez also mentions that "the only investigation that allows adversarial proceedings is the one initiated by the Federal Police, at the request of the Minister of Justice, aiming at the expulsion of a foreigner (Law No. 6.815/80, Article 70). Adversarial proceedings are mandatory in this case. There is no longer any mention of adversarial proceedings in judicial investigations for the investigation of bankruptcy crimes (Article 106 of the former Bankruptcy Law), since the new Bankruptcy and Business Recovery Law (Law No. 11.101/2005) abolished the judicial bankruptcy investigation and, consequently, adversarial proceedings in this case." Tourinho Filho states that "although the investigation is an administrative procedure, it is not punitive in nature. Thus, the expression 'accused in general' does not extend to 'suspects'."

Similarly, Alencar and Távora state that "the investigation is inquisitorial: prosecutorial activities are concentrated in the hands of a single authority, and there is no opportunity for adversarial proceedings or a full defense. In the pre-trial phase, there are no parties, only an investigating authority and the alleged offender, usually in the status of a suspect. The inquisitorial nature allows for agility in investigations, optimizing the actions of the police authority. However, since the suspect or defendant did not participate in the procedure, defending themselves and exercising adversarial proceedings, the judge cannot solely rely on the investigation to issue a guilty verdict, as it would clearly violate the constitutional text." The Superior Court of Justice takes a similar position:

The principles of adversarial proceedings and full defense do not apply to the police investigation, which is a mere administrative procedure of inquisitorial investigation"

— STJ, 5th Panel, Judge Gilson Dipp, decided on May 27, 2003, DJ, Aug 4, 2003, p. 327.

Given the non-application of adversarial proceedings during the investigation, the judge cannot convict the accused solely based on it, but the production of evidence in court is necessary to support the validity of the criminal action. Therefore, the investigation cannot be the sole source of conviction. This is provided for in Article 155, "caput," of the Code of Criminal Procedure (Title VII - Evidence, Chapter I - General Provisions), which establishes that the judge shall form his conviction through the free assessment of evidence produced in adversarial judicial proceedings, and shall not base his decision solely on informative elements obtained during the investigation, except for precautionary, non-repeatable, and advance evidence.

== Migratory Elements in Criminal Proceedings ==
Migratory elements in criminal proceedings are those that will serve as arguments to support a criminal conviction, extracted from the police investigation or during its continuation.

In Brazil, there are three migratory elements:

1. Precautionary evidence: evidence produced in advance due to necessity or urgency, such as telephone interception;
2. Irrepeatable evidence: evidence that cannot be reproduced later, such as the example of intoxication reported in the police investigation;
3. Evidence produced in advance: also known as advance evidence, it is evidence requested by the judge even during the stage of the police investigation, such as the questioning of a witness who is feared to leave the country or face imminent death.

== Closure of the Police Investigation ==
After the completion of the criminal investigations, to proceed with the closure of the inquiry, it is the responsibility of the officer to prepare a report containing a detailed description of the performed inquiries, as well as the heard witnesses and the indication of individuals who were not heard but are relevant to the inquiry. According to Mirabete, the authority should not express any value judgments, opinions, or judgments in their exposition, but only provide all the information gathered during the investigations and inquiries. However, they can express impressions left by the individuals involved in the inquiry. It is understood that if there is evidence both in favor and against the accused, the authority should proceed with the indictment based on the principle of in dubio pro societate ("in doubt, judge in favor of society").

Along with this report, the inquiry records are sent to the judge along with the instruments and objects related to the investigation, as stated in paragraphs 1 and 2 of Article 10 and Article 11 of the Code of Criminal Procedure.

Article 10 of the Code of Criminal Procedure stipulates that the inquiry is concluded within ten days if the accused is in custody or within thirty days if the accused is free (general rule). The thirty-day period for the accused who is free starts from the date the police authority receives the request, application, or from the day they become aware of the matter.

In cases of crimes against the popular economy (Law 1.521/51), the deadline to conclude the inquiry is ten days, whether the accused is in custody or free, according to paragraph 1 of Article 10 of the mentioned law. When the matter is difficult to elucidate and the accused is free, the authority may request an extension of the deadline from the judge. The judge, after hearing the Public Prosecutor's Office or the complainant, if applicable, will determine the return of the records, setting a new deadline for their conclusion. The holder of the criminal action, upon reading the inconclusive records, may conclude that they already have sufficient elements for filing the action and will proceed accordingly. However, they may agree to the return of the records and suggest one or another inquiry.

Fernando da Costa Tourinho makes the following observation:

The law speaks of returning it to the Police for further inquiries when the matter is difficult to elucidate. However, it is already common to request an extension of the deadline even in trivial cases, such as minor injuries with certain authorship, whose inquiry could be concluded within 24 hours... And extensions of the deadline are granted because Judges and Prosecutors recognize that there is not only one ongoing inquiry at the Police Stations, and, moreover, other tasks are also assigned to the Police Authorities.

Regarding crimes under the Drug Law, the deadline for completion is 30 days for the accused in custody and 90 days for the accused who is free, according to Article 51 of Law 11.343/06.

Only in the case of accused individuals who are free can the officer request an extension of the deadline to conclude the inquiry, and the new granted deadline will be determined by the judge, as stated in paragraph 3 of Article 10 of the Code of Criminal Procedure. Once the request for an extension of the deadline is granted, it is the responsibility of the judge to set another deadline by which the inquiry must be concluded. Obviously, this new deadline cannot exceed the one normally granted to the Police Authority for concluding inquiries (30 days). Requests for an extension of the deadline can only be made in the case described in paragraph 3 of Article 10 of the Code of Criminal Procedure. In other cases, even if there is no other remedy but to grant the request, the judge or the Public Prosecutor's Office may bring the matter to the attention of the Secretary of Public Security through the usual channels or to the Regional Delegate, for the appropriate disciplinary measures. Depending on the specific case, the authority may be held responsible for prevarication.

Inquiries conducted by the Federal Police, when the accused is in custody, have a deadline of 15 days for their conclusion, which can be extended once for the same period, according to Law 5.010/66. If the suspect has been arrested flagrantly and remains in custody, the Police Authority must conclude the inquiry within 10 days from the date of the arrest. At this point, the law does not allow for an extension. If the inquiry is not concluded within the fixed term established by law, in addition to the measures that can be taken against the negligent authority, the accused or someone on their behalf can file a writ of habeas corpus, based on Article 648, II of the Code of Criminal Procedure.

Regarding the accused under pretrial detention (Code of Criminal Procedure, Articles 311 to 316), the inquiry must be concluded within 10 days from the date the arrest warrant is executed. Therefore, if an inquiry is initiated on April 1, and on April 16 of the same month, the judge issues a pretrial detention order for the accused, and the arrest warrant is executed on April 18, the inquiry, which should have been concluded on April 30, will be concluded by April 27th since the conclusion, in this case, occurs within the 10-day period from the date the arrest warrant was executed.

The prevailing understanding in doctrine and jurisprudence is that the calculation of the inquiry period follows the procedural rules, meaning that the first day is excluded and the last day is included, according to paragraph 1 of Article 798 of the Code of Criminal Procedure.

== Archiving of the Police Investigation ==
After the criminal investigation is concluded, in the case of offenses with private prosecution, the inquiry records must be sent to the competent court, and according to Lopes (2010 p. 291/292):

[...] remaining available to the victim or even delivered by way of transcript. The Public Prosecutor's Office may request to view the inquiry records to evaluate whether there is any offense with public prosecution and, if so, offer the indictment based on this evidence or request further inquiries, provided they are aimed at investigating an offense with public prosecution. [...] The victim must exercise the complaint or expressly renounce the exercise of the criminal action. [...] However, it is not necessary for the victim to request the archiving; it is enough to let the statutory period lapse.

As taught by Aury Lopes Jr, in the case of offenses that entail public prosecution, the police authority must, after concluding the police inquiry, forward the records to the Public Prosecutor's Office, along with the tools used to commit the offense and all other objects that may serve for definitive instruction and trial. In the case of preemption, the records will be sent to the corresponding judge, who will then forward them to the Public Prosecutor's Office after reviewing them. The Code of Criminal Procedure establishes, in Article 17, that the police authority cannot archive the inquiry records, nor can the judge determine it suo motu.

Highlighting Lima's understanding (2009, p. 107):

Thus, first of all, it is observed that only the prosecutor can request the archiving since it is the exclusive duty of the prosecutor to promote the public criminal action, and likewise, it is their duty to refrain from this promotion in cases where it is not applicable.

Upon receiving the police inquiry, the prosecutor will have three options:

 a) They can carry out or request new indispensable inquiries, in their judgment, for the filing of the criminal action.

 b) They can request the archiving of the inquiry: in this case, the prosecutor concludes that there are no minimum elements to support the prosecution.

 c) They can file the indictment when the prosecutor concludes that there are sufficient elements regarding the authorship and materiality of the offense (Article 46 of the Code of Criminal Procedure).

If the prosecutor chooses to archive the inquiry, they must request it from the corresponding judge, who, upon receiving the request, will have two options:

 a) If the judge agrees with the request from the Public Prosecutor's Office, they will determine, by means of an order, the direct archiving of the records. In this case, according to Eugênio Pacelli de Oliveira (2010, p. 68), the records can only be reopened with the emergence of new evidence (Supreme Court ruling 524).

 b) If the judge does not agree with the archiving, they must apply the provisions of Article 28 of the Code of Criminal Procedure, which is the referral of the records to the Attorney General's Office so that they can offer the indictment, designating another organ of the Public Prosecutor's Office to present it, or confirm the request for archiving, which the judge will be obliged to comply with.

According to Lima (2009, p. 109):

Considering that the judge only has the options to decide according to the prosecutor's request or, at most, to forward the records to the head of the Public Prosecutor's Office, who will have the final say and, if they decide to archive, it will be mandatory, it is evident that the judge here only exercises control to allow a reassessment of the matter by the Higher Administration of the Public Prosecutor's Office. Thus, we can state that, in reality, the archiving is determined by the Public Prosecutor's Office, and the judicial scrutiny is only an intermediate control between the prosecutor and the Attorney General, to better assess the principle of the mandatory nature of public criminal action, and the decision to archive, on the other hand, is merely a determination to 'send the records to the archive'. [...]

It is important to note that the Public Prosecutor's Office's request for archiving must comply with the requirements contained in Article 395 of the Code of Criminal Procedure, as well as include elements that rule out the incompetence of the initial complaint and provide data that can identify the agent.

Aury Lopes Jr, as well as Marcellus Polastri Lima, teach that the archiving of the police inquiry does not create res judicata, according to Supreme Court ruling 524, which correctly states that the inquiry, after being archived, can only be reopened and the indictment filed with the emergence of new evidence. This is because, even after the inquiry is archived, according to Article 18 of the Brazilian Code of Criminal Procedure, the police authority can continue the investigation, conducting new research that may lead to the emergence of new evidence and, consequently, a request for the reopening of the inquiry to the Public Prosecutor's Office, as it has the final say regarding the archiving and is responsible for deciding on a possible reopening.

Marcellus Polastri Lima, in his Manual of Criminal Procedure, also alerts to the controversial figure of implicit or tacit archiving, which would occur in those cases where the Public Prosecutor's Office fails to include, in the indictment, some fact or some indicted individuals, without explicit reasoning, and the judge, when archiving, also does not make a statement. In this case, given the Public Prosecutor's Office's omission and the judge's inaction, implicit or tacit archiving is consolidated. However, the majority doctrine, including the author mentioned above, and the recent position adopted by state courts and the Superior Court of Justice, have been rejecting the possibility of implicit archiving, arguing that both Articles 28 and 18 of the Brazilian Penal Code, as well as Supreme Court ruling 524, only contemplate and apply explicit or direct archiving, that is, the one duly requested by the prosecutor with explicit reasoning and granted by the judge.

The courts express the same opinion: without the express and reasoned request from the Public Prosecutor's Office, the archiving is not considered under Brazilian law. Therefore, Marcellus Polastri Lima, in his Manual of Criminal Procedure, highlights on page 131 the understanding of the Superior Court of Justice on the subject:

The silence of the Public Prosecutor's Office regarding accused individuals whose names only appear later in an amendment to the indictment does not imply archiving concerning them. The process is considered archived only with the order of the judicial authority (Code of Criminal Procedure, Article 18) (RT 691/360).

== Bibliography ==
- ALENCAR, Rosmar Rodrigues; TÁVORA, Nestor. Curso de Direito Processual Penal. 8th ed. São Paulo: Juspodivm, 2013.
- Cabral, Bruno Fontenele & Souza, Rafael Pinto Marques de, Manual Prático de Polícia Judiciária, 2nd edition, Editora JusPodium, Brasília, 2013.
- CAPEZ, Fernando. Curso de Processo Penal. 19th ed. São Paulo: Saraiva, 2012.
- Daura, Anderson Souza, Inquérito Policial: Competência e Nulidades de Atos de Polícia Judiciária, 4th edition, Editora Juruá, Curitiba, 2011.
- FONTES, Eduardo & HOFFMANN, Henrique, Temas Avançados de Polícia Judiciária. 4th ed. Editora Juspodivm, Salvador, 2020.
- Mirabete, Julio Fabbrini, Código de Processo Penal Interpretado, Editora Atlas, São Paulo, 2000.
- Tourinho Filho, Fernando da Costa, Processo Penal, 13th edition, Editora Saraiva, São Paulo, 1992.
- Tourinho Filho, Fernando da Costa, Manual de Processo Penal, Editora Saraiva, São Paulo, 2001.
- TOURINHO FILHO, Fernando da Costa. Manual de Processo Penal. 16th ed. São Paulo: Saraiva, 2013.
- LIMA, Marcellus Polastri, Manual de Processo Penal. 3rd Edition, Editora Lumen Juris, 2009
- LOPES JR. Aury, Direito Processual Penal e sua conformidade constitucional. 5th Edition. Editora Lumes Juris, Rio de Janeiro, 2010.
- OLIVEIRA, Eugênio Pacelli de, Curso de Processo Penal. 13th Edition. Editora Lumen Juris. Rio de Janeiro, 2010.
