= TV Cultura do Pará =

Television station in Belém, Pará, Brazil

- Belém, Pará; Brazil
- Channels: Digital: 41 (UHF); Virtual: 2

Programming
- Affiliations: TV Brasil; TV Cultura

Ownership
- Owner: Government of the State of Pará; (Fundação Paraense de Radiodifusão - FUNTELPA)

History
- First air date: 31 March 1987
- Former call signs: ZYB 202
- Former channel numbers: Analog: 2 (VHF, 1987–2018)
- Former affiliations: TVE Brasil (1987–1995; 2002–2004); Rede Bandeirantes (1990–1993); TV Nacional do Brasil (1998–2004)

Technical information
- Licensing authority: ANATEL
- ERP: 10 kW
- Transmitter coordinates: 1°26′33.2″S 48°27′47.3″W

Links
- Public license information: Profile
- Website: portalcultura.com.br

TV Cultura do Pará (channel 2) is a Brazilian television station headquartered in Belém, the capital of the state of Pará. Owned by the state government's FUNTELPA, which also owns Rádio Cultura do Pará, the station has a mixed affiliation (toggling between TV Brasil and TV Cultura). It was founded in 1987, with the aim of creating educational content that values Paraese culture. Its studios are located in the Cremação neighborhood, and its transmitters are located in the Marco neighborhood.

== History ==
TV Cultura do Pará started its experimental phase on 2 January 1987, only serving as a relay station of TVE Brasil from Rio de Janeiro. The station started full-time regular broadcasts on 31 March, and premiered Jornal Cultura, with a length of thirty minutes. In January 1988, its local programming increased with Sem Censura Pará, Revista Feminina and other programs.

On 1 November 1990, following the end of Rede Bandeirantes' affiliation agreement with TV Guajará (when the network decided not to renew the contract it held since 1976, due to the station's precarious conditions), Cultura started relaying some of its programs via video tapes. At the time, Pará was still governed by Hélio Gueiros (already at the end of his mandate) and newly elected governor Jader Barbalho had acquired RBA TV the previous year from Jair Bernardino's family, who died at an air accident in Ilha das Onças, in Belém.

In June 1993, the station ceased relaying Rede Bandeirantes' programming, after RBA TV exchanged Rede Manchete for that network, and resumed relays of TVE Brasil's signal. In 1995, after eight years with TVE Brasil, the station started relaying TV Cultura's signal. In 1997, the station signed an agreement with Organizações Rômulo Maiorana to install relay stations in 78 municipalities.

On 22 June 1998, the station dropped TV Cultura and started carrying the newly launched TV Nacional Brasil.

In 2002, the station went through a series of free-form affiliations, airing programming from several public networks: Cultura, NBR, and also the newly renamed form TVE Brasil, Rede Brasil, until 2004, when it became a sole affiliate of TV Cultura. In this period, in 2007, it announced the suspension of the payments of the installation of relays in the inland areas, which caused a controversy.

Between 2007 and 2010, Cultura Rede de Comunicação was managed by Regina Lima. On 13 March 2007, the station celebrated its twentieth anniversary and released a documentary on the key events carried out by Jornal Cultura throughout its history on 18 March.

In 2008, TV Cultura do Pará ceased relaying TV Cultura and started relaying TV Brasil, becoming one of the first affiliates of the new government network. In 2009, the station started airing Campeonato Paraense de Futebol.

In 2011, when Simão Jatene became governor, Cultura Rede de Comunicação went through changes and journalist Adelaide Oliveira became its manager. In the same year, it started airing programs from TV Senado which was later seen only overnight.

On 19 May 2014, it introduced new one-minute segments in its programming, showing particularities of the state's culture and education, gathered under the tagline “É Cultura”. The first educational video was produced by TV Paragominas, Cultura's local relay there. Other videos were produced by Cultura, such as raio-que-o-parta architecture; painter, sculptor and artisan Alrimar Leal, in charge of Museu João Fona, in Santarém;buffaloes roaming in the Marajó region and a sunset in Marabá.

On 11 August 2015, TV Cultura do Pará announced that from 17 August, it would resume airing programs from TV Cultura. Even with the name change, it continued carrying programming from TV Brasil during selected timeslots, such as cartoons, special programming and sporting events, even sublicensing some events.

On 24 October 2018, the station and Rádio Cultura moved from its old facilities at the Marco neighborhood to its own headquarters in Cremação. The former location now only housed the transmitting equipment and Imprensa Oficial do Estado do Pará, with which it shared since 1981. In 2020, Imprensa Oficial do Estado left the former FUNTELPA facilities in Almirante Barroso, with the location being occupied by Centro Integrado de Comando e Controle do Pará (CICC) and Centro Integrado de Operações (CIOP), which was inaugurated in 2021, maintaining only the transmitters in the headauqrters of the public safety organs.

On 23 February 2019, it aired the parades of the special group of Carnaval de Belém with total exclusive rights, live from Aldeia de Cultura Amazônica Davi Miguel, it had already done coverage in the 2000s.

On 19 August 2019, it announced the carriage of Copa Verde de Futebol, as well as signing a partnership with TV Brasil for national coverage of the matches.

On 1 February 2020, the station struck a new partnership with TV Encontro das Águas from Manaus to carry Parazão 2020, for the first time outside of the state of Pará. TV Brasil also carried the matches.

On 14 and 15 February 2020, it carried Carnaval de Belém, in addition to Grupo Especial parades, it also aired those of Grupo de Accesso, airing highlights on 22 February.

On 6 September 2020, it aired the final of Parazão on a national network for the first time in the history of the event, through a partnership with TV Brasil, Rede Meio Norte, TV Macapá and TV Cultura (this last one only for YouTube and Facebook Watch).

== Technical information ==
Subchannels of TV Cultura do Pará
Virtual	Resolution	Content
2.1	1080i	Rede Cultura do Pará/TV Brasil/TV Cultura's main schedule

TV Cultura do Pará started its digital broadcasts on 14 December 2012, through physical UHF channel 41 in Belém and adjacent areas. High definition broadcasts started on 17 January 2017, expanding to a full schedule on 30 October that year.

The station shut down its analog signal on 15 January 2018, little more than four months ahead of the expected analog shutdown date in Belém.
