= TV Nacional =

TV Nacional (ZYA 505)
- Brasília, Federal District; Brazil
- Channels: Analog: 2 (VHF)
- Branding: TV Nacional

Programming
- Affiliations: NBR and SescTV

Ownership
- Owner: Radiobrás – Empresa Brasileira de Comunicação S.A.

History
- Founded: June 25, 1960
- First air date: December 1, 2007
- Former channel numbers: Analog: 3 (VHF, 1960–1986)
- Former affiliations: TV Excelsior (1960–1967); Rede Globo (1967–1970); REI (1975); TV Record (1982–1983); Rede Bandeirantes (1977–1982; 1985); Rede Manchete (1983–1985); TV Cultura (1970–1975; 1993–2007); TVE Brasil (1975–1977; 1985–2007); NBR (1999–2007); SescTV (2005–2007)

Technical information
- Licensing authority: ANATEL

TV Nacional (channel 2) was a Brazilian television station based in Brasília, Federal District. It was owned by Radiobrás, a public company that controlled the Federal Government's media outlets, including both Nacional AM and FM radio stations. Nacional was one of the first three television stations to be opened in 1960 at the same time as the new federal capital, which until then was located in Rio de Janeiro. In 2007, with the merger between Radiobrás and Associação de Comunicação Educativa Roquette Pinto do Rio, which resulted in the creation of Empresa Brasil de Comunicação, the station ended its operations to give way to TV Brasil Capital, generator and head of the TV Brasil network.

== History ==
Rádio Nacional do Rio de Janeiro planned to have its television station in 1954, in the then capital, Rio de Janeiro, however, it did not proceed due to the political crisis that the country found itself in during 1954, after the death of Getúlio Vargas. It was only during the JK government that the concession of Rádio Nacional was authorized, this time in Brasília.

During the construction of the new federal capital, the Brazilian government opened a public tender for the acquisition of three television concessions for Diários Associados, Emissoras Unidas and the Union itself. On April 21, 1960, at the inauguration of the city, TV Nacional entered on air on an experimental basis, together with TV Brasília and TV Alvorada, on VHF channel 3. TV Nacional was the first state-owned broadcaster in Brazil. Initially it had a diverse program offer, ranging from its own telenovelas to political coverage of the new capital. The station was named after its sister station, Rádio Nacional de Brasília.

On May 5th, a group of directors from Rádio Nacional in Rio de Janeiro formed by Paulo Netto, Paulo Tapajós, Ghiaroni, Nestor de Holanda and Lourival Marques arrived in Brasília for a meeting where it was decided that June 4th would be the date for the official launch of the station. On this day, at 8 pm, the station begins its broadcasts definitively with the arrival of the President of the Republic Juscelino Kubitschek and his entourage. Then, the Rádio Nacional orchestra plays the Brazilian National Anthem with maestro Radamés Gnattali conducting, and presenter César de Alencar leads the Show de Inauguração, the channel's first program.

The following day, Nacional airs the first programs: Dedé e Dino (directed by the then rising comedian Dedé Santana together with his brother Dino Santana and with the participation of actress Ana Rosa), Encontro Musical Bossa Nova (directed by Gerly Rodrigues and with the participation by guitarist Dilermando Reis) and Pelos Caminhos da Música (directed and presented by Paulo Netto and ensemble by Bernard Condorsiê). Also at this time, an auditorium program aimed at children presented by Wanderley Mattos and live theater plays staged and directed by Shirley Padrão were created.

During João Goulart's government, TV Nacional delayed paying its actors' salaries for months, only being returned at the beginning of the military regime.

With the strengthening of TV Excelsior on the Rio-São Paulo axis and the implementation of its network project for the entire country, TV Nacional, in 1963, began to retransmit programs and telenovelas from the Mário Wallace Simonsen channel, greatly reducing its production.

Between the 1960s and 1970s, TV Nacional rebroadcast programs from networks such as TV Excelsior, Rede Globo, TV Cultura, Rede de Emissoras Independentes and Rede Bandeirantes, until establishing a partnership with TVE Rio de Janeiro.

On November 16, 1981, a program began on TV Nacional, in partnership with CPCE at UnB, broadcast throughout Brazil, with the title "Universidade Aberta" with the aim of debating and analyzing cultural and political themes. of importance at the moment.

In March 1982, after having censored and having stopped retransmitting a large part of Bandeirantes' programming, including programs with higher ratings such as Jornal Bandeirantes and Canal Livre, TV Nacional migrated to TV Record and remained until 1983.

In 1983, it joined Rede Manchete, for a short period retransmitting Bandeirantes again and returning shortly afterwards to TVE. In 1986, it moved its transmission to channel 2 VHF for the arrival of TV Bandeirantes Brasília. In 1998, it became part of the newly created Public Television Network, led by TVE and TV Cultura de São Paulo. It rebroadcast programs from the extinct NBR from 1999 to 2004.

At the beginning of 2002, further reinforcing the Radiobras-Acerp partnership that would result in the future TV Brasil, TV Nacional produced together with TVE RJ the program "Encontro com a Imprensa".

From 2005 onwards, it retransmitted STV programming (currently SescTV) along with programs from other broadcasters that are part of ABEPEC, such as TV Cultura, TVE, Rede Minas and others.

In May 2007, it was announced that a new federal government public TV was being planned. To enable the formation of the station, the then president Luiz Inácio Lula da Silva signed, in October, a provisional measure and, later, a decree in the Official Gazette of the Union that created the Empresa Brasil de Comunicação (EBC), the result of the merger between Radiobrás and the Roquette Pinto Educational Communication Association of Rio de Janeiro, sponsor of MEC AM and FM radio stations and TVE Brasil. With the new government body, TV Brasil was formed, which would have branches in Brasília, Rio and São Luís, going on air at noon on December 2, replacing TV Nacional, TVE Brasil and TVE Maranhão.
