= SECOM =

SECOM may refer to:

- Nova Southeastern College of Osteopathic Medicine, a Florida college
- Secom, a Japanese security company
- Secretariat of Social Communication, a federal ministry in Brazil
