= Uruará =

- Municipality
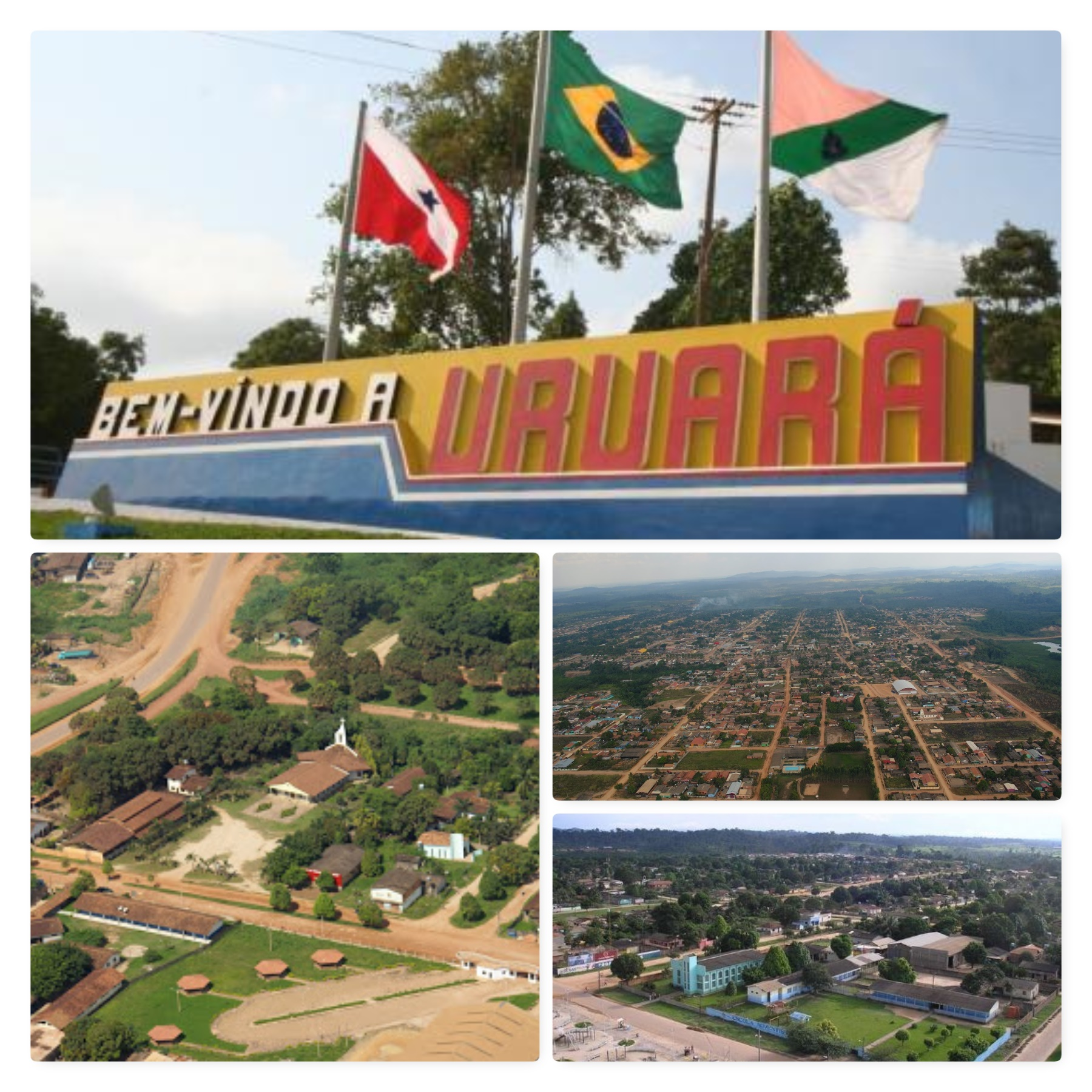
- Images (top to bottom-left) Welcome to Uruará sign. Local church. Aerial photo of Uruará. CCJ/SCFV

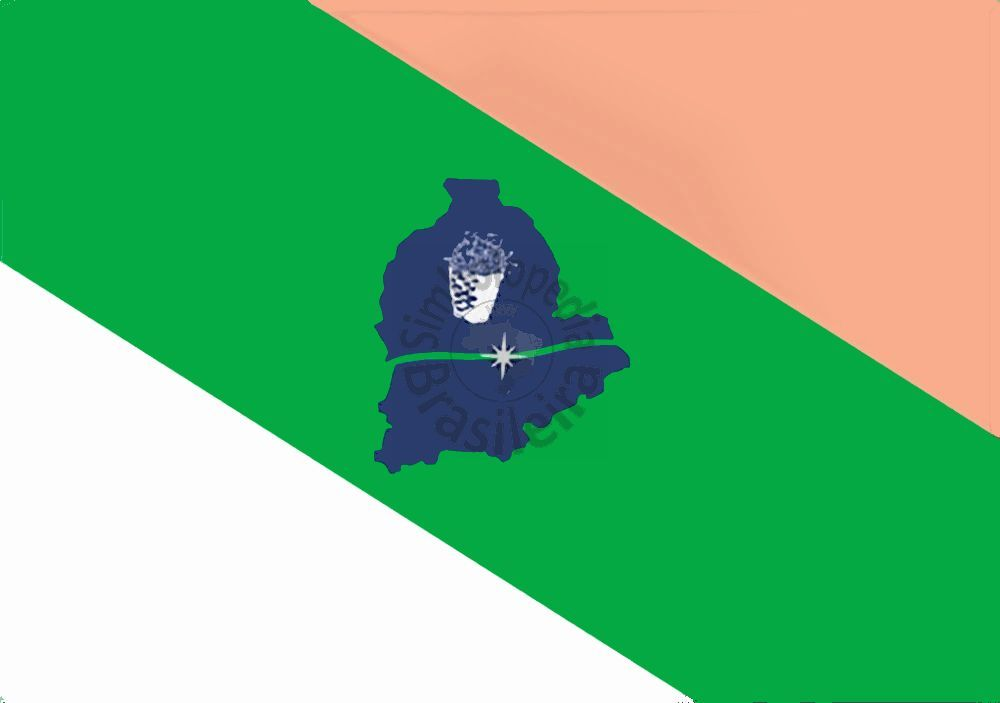
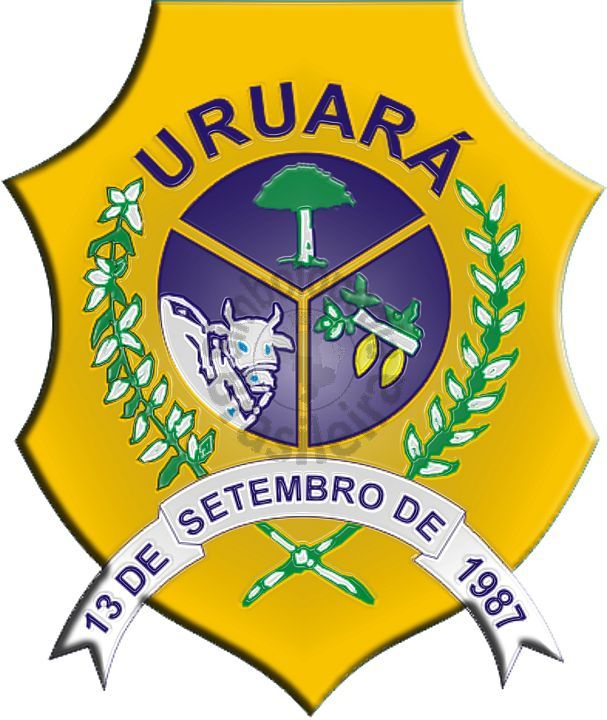
- Flag Coat of arms

- Location of Uruará from Pará

- Location in Brazil
- Coordinates: 03°43′03″S 53°44′12″W
- Country: Brazil
- Region: Northern
- State: Pará
- Mesoregion: Sudoeste Paraense
- Bordering municipalites: Medicilândia, Placas, Santarém, Prainha, Mojuí dos Campos, Brasil Novo e Altamira
- Distance away from Capital: 634km
- Foundation: September 13, 1987
- Inaugurated: May 5, 1988
- Districts: Vila Brasil, Centro, Fluminense, Jardim Morumbi, Mini Indústria, Aeroporto

Government
  - Mayor: Carlos Antônio Zancan

Area
  - Municipality: 4,166.550 sq mi (10,791.315 km^{2})
  - Water: 0 sq mi (0 km^{2}) 0%
  - Urban: 3.68 sq mi (9.54 km^{2})

Dimensions
  - Length: 1.35 mi (2.18 km)
- Elevation: 423 ft (129 m)

Population (2020)
  - Municipality: 45,435
  - Density: 11/sq mi (4.2/km^{2})
- Time zone: UTC−3 (BRT)
- Area code: 1508159

Uruará is a municipality in the state of Pará in the Northern region of Brazil.

== History ==
It originated as a settlement that emerged in the 1970s, then was elevated to the category of district belonging to the municipality of Prainha, in 1984. In 1989 it obtained municipal autonomy.

In the 2000s, the municipality underwent changes due to migration, especially from people originating from the Northeast and Southeast of Brazil. The expansion of new peripheral neighborhoods is noticeable, resulting Insecurity inhabitants, distributed across 10,791 square kilometres (4,166 sq mi) of territorial extension.

== Geography ==
Located at latitude 03º43'03" south and longitude 53º44'12" west, at an altitude of 129 meters above sea level.

=== Socio-environmental problems ===
Due to high rates of deforestation, on November 9, 2023, the municipality of Rio Branco was included in the list of municipalities located in the Amazon biome considered a priority by the government for actions to prevent, control and reduce deforestation and forest degradation.

=== Tourism ===
The equatorial climate, typical of the Amazon, allows for travel and excursions at all times of the year. The city has bathing resorts and several rapids, which are very popular during the Amazonian summer, with average temperatures of 32°C.

== Infrastructure ==
=== Television ===
TV Vale do Uruará is Uruará's first television station in the municipality. Since its foundation in 1995. Then In 2016, TV Talento sometime later.

Channel 11: TV Vale do Uruará (Band)

Channel 12 (TV Cultura do Pará)

Channel 15: (Rede Super)

Channel 24: (Nova Geração de Televisão)

Channel 27: TV Metropolitana MA (Top TV)

Channel 49: TV Talento (SBT)

=== Education ===
The Trans-Amazonian Highway (BR 230), Altamira/Itaituba section, features a school that served as a fundamental landmark for the construction of houses in the surrounding area, giving rise to the Uruará Agropoles. Starting with the school, the attraction of new residents increases, aiming at the education of their children. Along with the growth of the city, Still in the late 1970s, more teachers from the La Salle Religious Institution and others arrived in Agrópoles Uruará, settled there, and embraced the educational struggle. Implementing Elementary Education. After the creation of the municipality of Uruará, efforts were made to implement Education, bringing Secondary Education to the municipality, giving the children of those residents the opportunity for qualification They believed and remained in this land.

=== Highway ===
Highways BR-230 and PA-370 is the only two highways that connects Uruará to Amazonas and Santarém respectively.

=== Sports ===
Uruará's major sports complex is the "Complexo Esportivo Vila Brasil" at the Vila Brasil district. The complex hosted events in the city over the years.

== See also ==
- List of municipalities in Pará
