= TV Equinócio =

Macapá, Amapá; Brazil
- Channels: Digital: 35 (UHF); Virtual: 10
- Branding: TV Equinócio

Programming
- Affiliations: Record

Ownership
- Owner: TV Equinócio Comunicações Ltda. - EPP
- Sister stations: Equinócio FM

History
- First air date: May 4, 1988
- Former names: TV Marco Zero (1988-2005); TV Gazeta Marco-Zero (2005-2012)
- Former channel numbers: Analog: 10 (VHF, 1988–2018)
- Former affiliations: SBT (1988-2000)

Technical information
- Licensing authority: ANATEL
- Transmitter coordinates: 00°00′50.3″S 51°04′26.9″W

Links
- Public license information: Profile
- Website: equinocioplay.com.br

TV Equinócio (channel 10) is a Record-affiliated television station licensed to Macapá, capital of the state of Amapá.

== History ==
The former TV Marco Zero was established on May 4, 1988 as an SBT affiliate, by initiative of Roberto Valente and Douglas Almeida. Douglas left the station in 1989, being replaced by Manoel Pereira da Costa and Raimundo Costa de Souza. Two months after Douglas left, the other founder Roberto Valente cut his ties with the company.

In 1992, José Alcolumbre started managing the company with Manoel Costa; Alcolumbre later became the station's main owner. Under his management, TV Marco Zero became a statewide network with relay stations in Laranjal do Jari and Ferreira Gomes. Its news division strengthened in tandem. Subsequently in 1997, Organizações José Alcolumbre opened two further stations, TV Macapá and TV Amazônia. In 2000, the station exchanged affiliations with TV Amazônia, becoming a Record affiliate.

In 2005, José Alcolumbre sold 25% of the shares to Grupo Gazeta de Comunicação, becoming TV Gazeta-Marco Zero.

In 2012, it adopted its current name, TV Equinócio. On October 25, 2014, at the eves of the election, the station was taken off the air for a period of 24 hours by determination of electoral judge Cassius Clay, of TRE-AP. According to the judge, the station failed to comply with electoral law nº 9504 of 09/30/1997, which prevents broadcasters from advertising for and against political candidates. The fact occurred because the presenter of Balanço Geral AP, Luis Eduardo, made harsh criticisms and asked the broadcaster to air a video that demonstrated alleged vote buying made by members of the state government for Camilo Capiberibe (PSB-AP). The station returned to the air on October 26.

== Technical information ==
Virtual channel	Digital channel	Aspect ratio	Content
10.1	35 UHF	1080i	Main TV Equinócio programming / Record
