= Edinho Silva =

Brazilian politician (born 1965)

- Silva in 2015

Member-elect of the Chamber of Deputies
- Assuming office 1 February 2027
- Constituency: São Paulo

President of the Workers' Party
- Incumbent
- Assumed office 7 July 2025
- Preceded by: Humberto Costa

Mayor of Araraquara
- In office 1 January 2017 – 1 January 2025
- Vice Mayor: Damiano Neto
- Preceded by: Marcelo Barbieri
- Succeeded by: Doutor Lapena
- In office 1 January 2001 – 1 January 2009
- Vice Mayor: Sergio Medici
- Preceded by: Waldemar de Santi
- Succeeded by: Marcelo Barbieri

Secretary of Social Communication
- In office 21 March 2015 – 12 May 2016
- President: Dilma Rousseff
- Preceded by: Thomas Traumann
- Succeeded by: Márcio de Freitas Gomes

Member of the Legislative Assembly of São Paulo
- In office 15 March 2011 – 15 March 2015
- Constituency: At-large

Member of the Municipal Chamber of Araraquara
- In office 1 January 1993 – 1 January 2001
- Constituency: At-large

Personal details
- Born: Edson Antonio da Silva; 20 June 1965 (age 61) Pontes Gestal, São Paulo, Brazil
- Party: PT (since 1985)
- Education: São Paulo State University
- Profession: Sociologist
- Website: www.edinhosilva.com.br

Edson Antonio da Silva (born 20 June 1965), better known as Edinho Silva, is a Brazilian politician serving as president of the Workers' Party since 2025. He served as mayor of Araraquara from 2001 to 2008 and from 2017 to 2024. From 2015 to 2016, he served as secretary of social communication. From 2011 to 2015, he was a member of the Legislative Assembly of São Paulo. From 1993 to 2000, he was a municipal councillor of Araraquara.
