= Canal Gov =

Brazilian TV channel

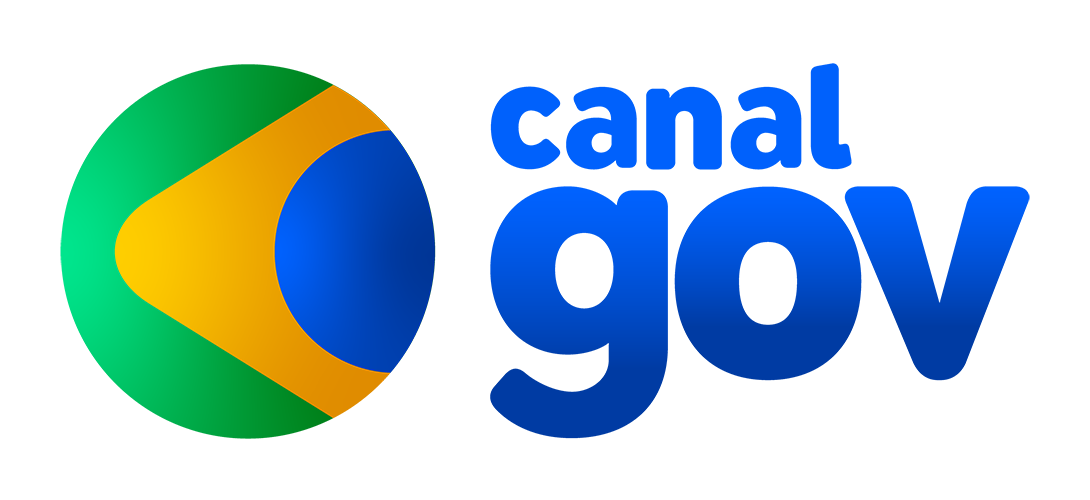
- Country: Brazil
- Headquarters: Brasília, Brazil

Programming
- Language: Portuguese
- Picture format: HDTV 1080i (downscaled to 480i for the SD feed)

Ownership
- Owner: SECOM (operated by Empresa Brasil de Comunicação)

History
- Launched: 16 June 1998
- Former names: TV NBR (1998–2019); TV Brasil 2 (2019–2023)

Links
- Website: agenciagov.ebc.com.br/canal-gov

Canal Gov is a government-owned television channel in Brazil. Owned by the Secretariat of Social Communications and operated by Empresa Brasil de Comunicação (EBC), it broadcasts news and public affairs programmes, including coverage of governmental events.

== History ==
The channel first launched on 16 June 1997 as TV Nacional do Brasil (TV NBR or NBR), during the government of President Fernando Henrique Cardoso,. Despite being educational, the station broadcast live all acts, ceremonies and inaugurations of FHC and gained several affiliates, generating controversy for unlawful use of mass media for election campaign, which occurred in the same year.

On 9 April 2019, amid changes to the EBC under Jair Bolsonaro's government, NBR TV was merged into TV Brasil and replaced by TV Brasil 2, while TV Brasil increasingly carried coverage of activity such as media appearances by Bolsonaro, and news programming following the party line rather than acting as a public service broadcaster.

After the election of Luiz Inácio Lula da Silva to a second presidency in 2022, the incoming Secretary of Social Communication Paulo Pimenta stated in December 2022 that there were plans to return TV Brasil to a public service format, and for government-related programmes to be split back out into a second broadcaster. Around the same time, live coverage of governmental business (which dominated TV Brasil programming during Bolsonaro's presidency) was moved to TV Brasil 2. On 24 July 2023, TV Brasil 2 was rebranded as Canal Gov.
