= TV Encontro das Águas =

TV Encontro das Águas (ZYQ 181)
Manaus, Amazonas; Brazil
- Channels: Digital: 32 (UHF); Virtual: 2

Programming
- Affiliations: TV Brasil

Ownership
- Owner: Sistema de Comunicação Encontro das Águas; (Fundação Televisão e Rádio Cultura do Amazonas)
- Sister stations: Rádio Encontro das Águas

History
- First air date: March 12, 1971
- Former call signs: ZYA 425
- Former names: TV Educativa (1971–1993); TV Cultura Amazonas (1993–2019)
- Former channel numbers: Analog: 2 (VHF, 1971–2018)
- Former affiliations: TVE Brasil (1975–1995); TV Cultura (1995–2009; 2017–2019)

Technical information
- Licensing authority: ANATEL
- ERP: 4.8 kW
- Transmitter coordinates: 3°7′9.73″S 60°1′1.24″W

Links
- Public license information: Profile
- Website: tveradioencontrodasaguas.com.br

TV Encontro das Águas (channel 2) is a Brazilian public broadcasting television station based in Manaus, Amazonas. Owned by the Encontro das Águas Communication System, a group linked to the Amazon government that also controls Rádio Encontro das Águas, the station is affiliated with TV Brasil, and is a member of the Rede Nacional de Comunicação Pública.

The station was opened on March 12, 1971, during the administration of governor Danilo Areosa as TV Educativa (TVE) with the aim of offering education to first grade students in state public schools. The educational system, however, was officially implemented the following year, mixing its own classes with those of TVE Maranhão. With its discontinuation in 1977, the broadcaster continued producing generalist cultural programs, which were already shown during the period in which the teleclasses were aired. In 1993 it became TV Cultura Amazonas, and in 2019 it adopted its current name.

== History ==
The idea of creating an educational television station in Amazonas came from governor Danilo Areosa in 1967 during an air trip from Rio de Janeiro to Manaus, having concluded, after reading an article in a French magazine about the experience with the educational model on television in that country, that its implementation would change, in the short term, the educational panorama of the state and would meet the educational and cultural needs, especially of the population of the interior. With a working group formed by the secretary of education and culture Vinícius Câmara to develop the project, a channel to operate the station was requested from the Brazilian government in the same year and granted in January 1968. Planned to be implemented immediately, the project went through a long process of releasing equipment for installation, which took around three years.

On March 12, 1971, three days before Areosa left the government, TV Educativa went on air at 4 pm on VHF channel 2. With an air of improvisation, it was installed in an expropriated school without having a studio, sufficient equipment and experienced technical staff and with a signal emitted only eighty kilometers away, not reaching the interior public. After four months of operating on an experimental basis, TVE began its local production with a news program and, until new programs were created, the rest of the programming, operated between 4pm and 10pm, showed films, documentaries and animations.

In 1972, governor João Walter de Andrade invited the former secretary of Education of Maranhão José Maria Cabral Marques to take over the local ministry and transferred the presidency of the Fundação Televisão Educativa do Amazonas to his position for his work. in the creation of TVE Maranhão. Thus, on September 9, TVE's first educational program was aired, which, at the same time as it continued to show generalist programs, began to produce their own teleclasses and buy some from the Maranhão broadcaster to serve the teleclasses of the Manaus public school network. The system, which covered content from the fifth and sixth grades of higher education, reached around nine thousand students. Around 1975, an agreement was signed with TVE Rio de Janeiro to prepare the producers of classes in the capital and in the interior of Amazonas, with the first two classes studying educational production in Rio and then the courses were held in Manaus. In 1977, two years after Cabral Marques left the secretary and presidency of TVE, the station's school program was discontinued by the department.

On December 17, 1981, the Amazonas Educational Television and Radio Foundation was transformed into an agency and became known as the Amazonas Educational Television and Radio Superintendency (STREA), which in turn gave way to the Amazonas Cultural Television and Radio Foundation. (FUNTEC) on June 9, 1993, changing the station's name to TV Cultura Amazonas.

On September 20, 2019, the station became TV Encontro das Águas, the result of research commissioned by the Amazonas government that found that its brand did not reach a local level. Since then, it has retransmitted TV Brasil programming, previously shared with TV Cultura.
