= Paulo Pimenta =

Brazilian journalist, agricultural technician, and politician (born 1965)

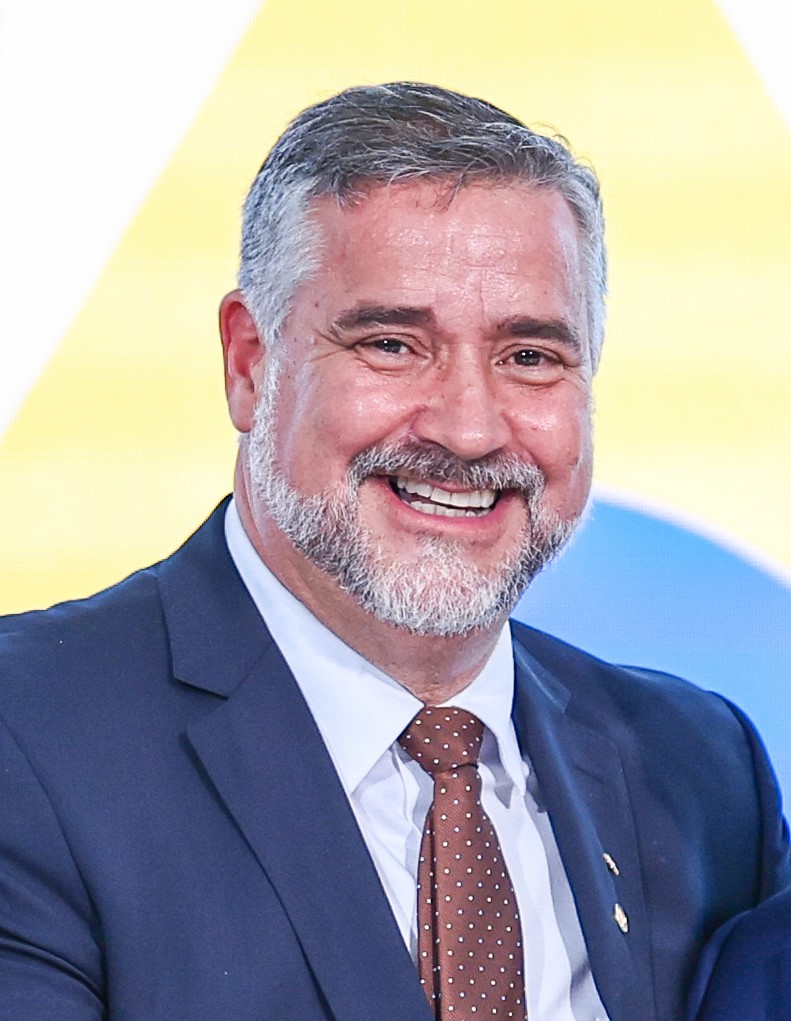
- Paulo Pimenta in 2023

Secretariat of Social Communication
- In office 1 January 2023 – 15 May 2024
- Preceded by: André de Sousa Costa
- Succeeded by: Laércio Portela (interim)
- In office 10 September 2024 – 7 January 2025
- Preceded by: Laércio Portela (interim)
- Succeeded by: Sidônio Palmeira

Secretary of Support for Reconstruction of Rio Grande do Sul
- In office 15 May 2024 – 10 September 2024
- President: Luiz Inácio Lula da Silva

Federal Deputy
- Incumbent
- Assumed office 1 February 2003
- Constituency: Rio Grande do Sul

Vice Mayor of Santa Maria
- In office 2001–2002

State Deputy of Rio Grande do Sul
- In office 1999–2000
- Constituency: At-large

Personal details
- Born: Paulo Roberto Severo Pimenta; 19 March 1965 (age 61) Santa Maria, Rio Grande do Sul, Brazil
- Party: PT (1985–present)

Paulo Roberto Severo Pimenta (born 19 March 1965) is a Brazilian journalist, agricultural technician, and politician, who was the Chief Minister of Brazil's Secretariat of Social Communication from September 10, 2024 to January 7, 2025 and previously from January 1, 2023 to May 15, 2024. He has been a member of the Workers' Party (PT) since 1985.

During the course of his political career, he was a councilman for the PT in his hometown of Santa Maria, in the state of Rio Grande do Sul, and was elected state deputy in 1998. In 2000, he was elected vice-mayor of Santa Maria, with Valdeci Oliveira as mayor. Since 2003, he has been a federal deputy from the state of Rio Grande do Sul. In 2008, he ran to be the mayor of Santa Maria but came in second place. In 2010, he was the most voted for candidate from the PT in Rio Grande do Sul, with 153,172 votes. In 2014, he was reelected as a federal deputy with the most votes for a PT candidate, with 140,868 votes, becoming the 6th most voted federal deputy in Rio Grande do Sul.

== Early life ==
Pimenta is the son of Paulo Roque Mello Pimenta, ex-employee of the autonomous department DAER, and Rita Beatriz Severo Pimenta, a retired state school teacher. He is married to teacher Cláudia Pereira Dutra and has three children: Francisco, Antonio and Paula. Pimenta is a journalist who graduated from the Federal University of Santa Maria (UFSM) in 1994. He previously was an agricultural technician. He also took agronomy courses at UFSM, but did not complete the major.

== Political career ==
At 16 years old, Pimenta was the president of the students' union of the agricultural college at UFSM, and in 1981, was president of the Central Directory of Students. Initially an activist from the left-wing political group Resistência, which included people from the city such as Marcos Rolim as leaders, he became known when he was injured in a shooting by an assailant from Santa Maria. He was in fact painting a message on the side of his house, "Diretas Urgente para Reitor e Presidente", as was common in that time. The assailant was found guilty for the crime. Pimenta's group kept going forward as his name reached public notoriety due to the incident. He became the vice-president of the State Union of Students of Rio Grande do Sul, at 21, from 1986 to 1987.

Pimenta began his political career as a councilman in Santa Maria. In the municipal elections of 1996, he ran, without success, to be the vice-mayor of the city with the coalition headed by Carlos Renan Kurtz of the PDT. He was elected a state deputy in Rio Grande do Sul in 1998. In 2000, he was elected vice-mayor of Santa Maria, with Valdeci Oliveira as mayor. In 2003, he was elected federal deputy, and was reelected in 2006 and 2011. In 2008, he ran to be mayor of Santa Maria, but lost to Cezar Schirmer.

=== Councilman ===
Pimenta was, for two mandates, a councilman from the PT in Santa Maria. He was first elected in 1988 and, in the next election in 1992, was one of the most voted candidates in the city. As councilman, he was the vice-president of the chamber of councilors, presided over the Justice and Human Rights commission, the Public Services commission, and the subcommission of Education, Culture, Science and Technology. The latter commission elaborated on the Organic Law of Santa Maria, along with having proposed to the commission the internal regime of the chamber. Pimenta was the leader of the PT faction in the chamber, as well as the leader of the opposition.

In the municipal chamber of Santa Maria, Pimenta occupied positions on the board of directors. He was a member of various municipal commissions during his time as councilman. He became, in 1997, vice-president of the state branch of the PT in Rio Grande do Sul.

=== State deputy ===
Pimenta was elected as a state deputy in 1998 and presided over the Legislative Assembly's Planning and Finance Commission. During his mandate, he was part of governor Olívio Dutra's support in the Assembly. In 2000, he proposed and presided over the parliamentary inquiry (CPI) that investigated organized crime in Rio Grande do Sul and returned to Santa Maria, when he was elected vice-mayor. Along with being vice-mayor, he was secretary-general of the government and municipal finance secretary.

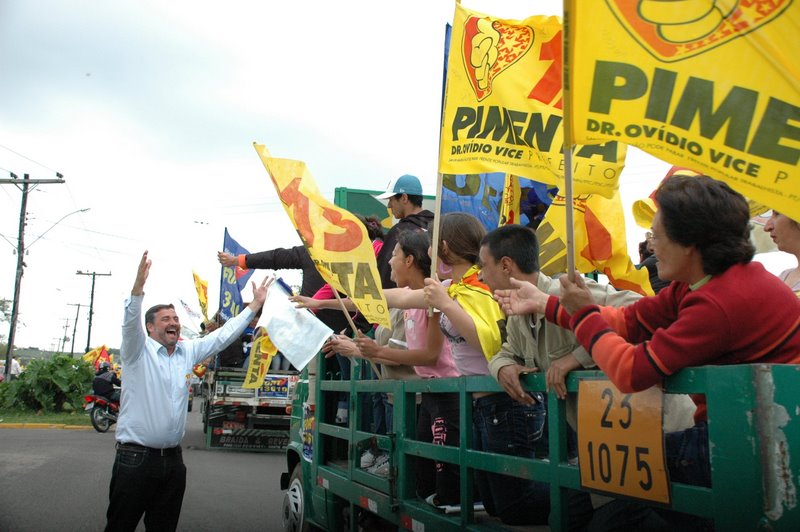
Paulo Pimenta with supporters

=== Federal deputy ===
In 2002, Pimenta was elected federal deputy with the largest share of the vote obtained in the central region of the state for a candidate from said region, as well as the most voted PT candidate from outside of the Porto Alegre region. He was reelected in 2006 with 104,430 votes, and was reelected again in 2010 as the most voted deputy from the PT in Rio Grande do Sul with 153,172 votes. He was again the most voted for federal deputy from the PT in 2014 with 140,868 votes. In 2018, he was reelected with 151,719 votes. In 2022, Pimenta was the third most voted for federal deputy in Rio Grande do Sul, with 223,109 votes, the most votes for a PT candidate in the history of the state.

In June 2017, Pimenta and fellow federal deputy Wadih Damous placed Carla Zambelli under citizen's arrest after she was accused of defamation. The accusation came after Zambelli claimed she was "working, unlike them, who were stealing". Pimenta had legislative police escort her to the police station inside the Congress. The deputy, however, did not press charges against Zambelli.

In 2018, he was investigated for supposed money laundering; however, in October 2020, a regional court stopped the investigation into Pimenta.

==== Career in the Chamber of Deputies ====
In his first months in Congress, Pimenta was part of the CPI on Arms Trafficking, integrated the Commission on External Relations and National Defence and the Commission on Public Safety and Combatting Organized Crime. He also introduced bill 7134/02, which was the origin of new drug laws in Brazil, as well as for the provisory measures on gene delivery, which resulted in new biosecurity laws. He had a decisive role in the creation of the Federal University of Pampa (UNIPAMPA).

In 2009, Pimenta presented to Congress several bills such as those supporting public student support funds (4945/09), digital citizenship (4805/09), wine making (1.988/03), the Emprego 40 Anos program (3.345/04), criminal liability (411/03), and a proposed constitutional amendment to require a diploma to enter the profession of journalism (386/2009). In 2009 as well, he was designated the reporter of the CPI on urban violence, that proposed a new model of public security in Brazil. In the same year, he was the president of the CPI on Combatting Organized Crime, as well as the Commission on Legislative Participation.

==== CPI on Mensalão ====
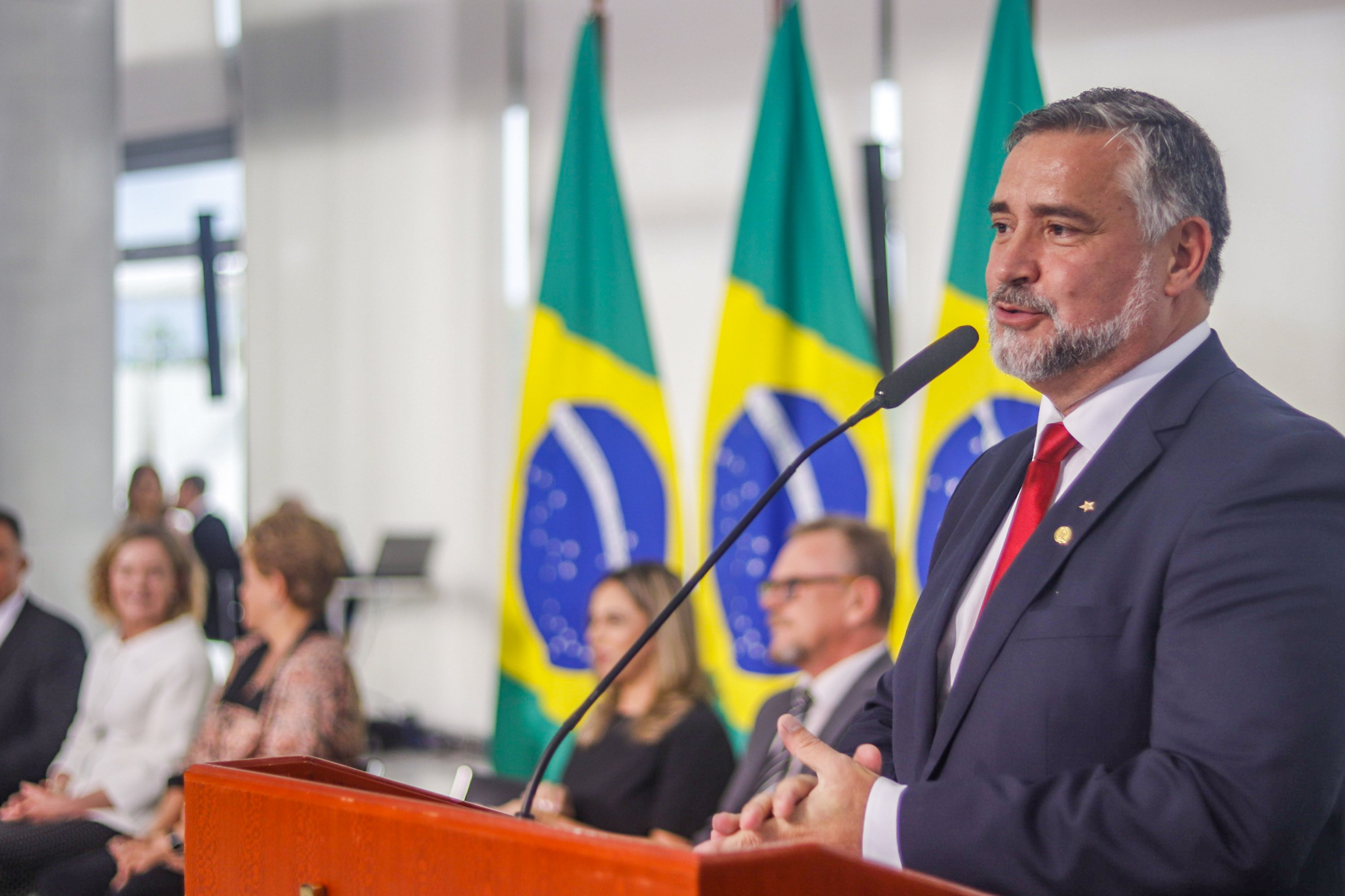
Paulo Pimenta making his first speech as minister in the Salão Nobre of the Palácio do Planalto

On 11 August 2005, Pimenta was the vice-president of the Parliamentary Commission of the inquiry into the Mensalão scandal, which resulted in AP 470, judged by the Supreme Federal Court in 2012. Regardless, he left the position after presenting a list of people that benefitted from transfers made by businesses owned by Marcos Valério in Minas Gerais, following what was shown to be the precursor to Mensalão that had begun in 1998 among officials in the government of Minas Gerais, a scandal known as the Mensalão tucano.

The list of implicated deputies from the state provoked a strong negative response from the members of the two CPIs, due to the fact that it had been delivered during an "informal" meeting between Valério and Pimenta, recorded on camera in the parking garage of the Chamber of Deputies. The act was considered to be behavior incompatible with the position of the commission's vice-president. In response, however, Pimenta had declared that he had not acted in bad faith. As a result, there was a petition to revoke his position due to having broken chamber decor. Pimenta was pressured to resign from his position so as to not risk delegitimizing the parliamentary commission on the inquiry.

=== Chief minister of Secretary of Social Communication ===
On 29 December 2021, Luiz Inácio Lula da Silva confirmed that Pimenta would be, if he was re-elected, the Minister of the Secretariat of Social Communication in his administration. In his inaugural speech he made it a priority to combat fake news and the end of the fencing in of journalists that was prominent during the Jair Bolsonaro administration. Pimenta was succeeded by Sidônio Palmeira on January 14, 2025.

Political offices
Preceded by André de Sousa Costa	Secretary of Social Communication; 2023–2024	Succeeded by Laércio Portela (interim)
Preceded by Laércio Portela (interim)	Secretary of Social Communication; 2024–2025	Succeeded by Sidônio Palmeira
New office	Secretary of Support for Reconstruction of Rio Grande do Sul; 2024	Office abolished
