= Sidônio Palmeira =

Brazilian engineer and executive (born 1958)

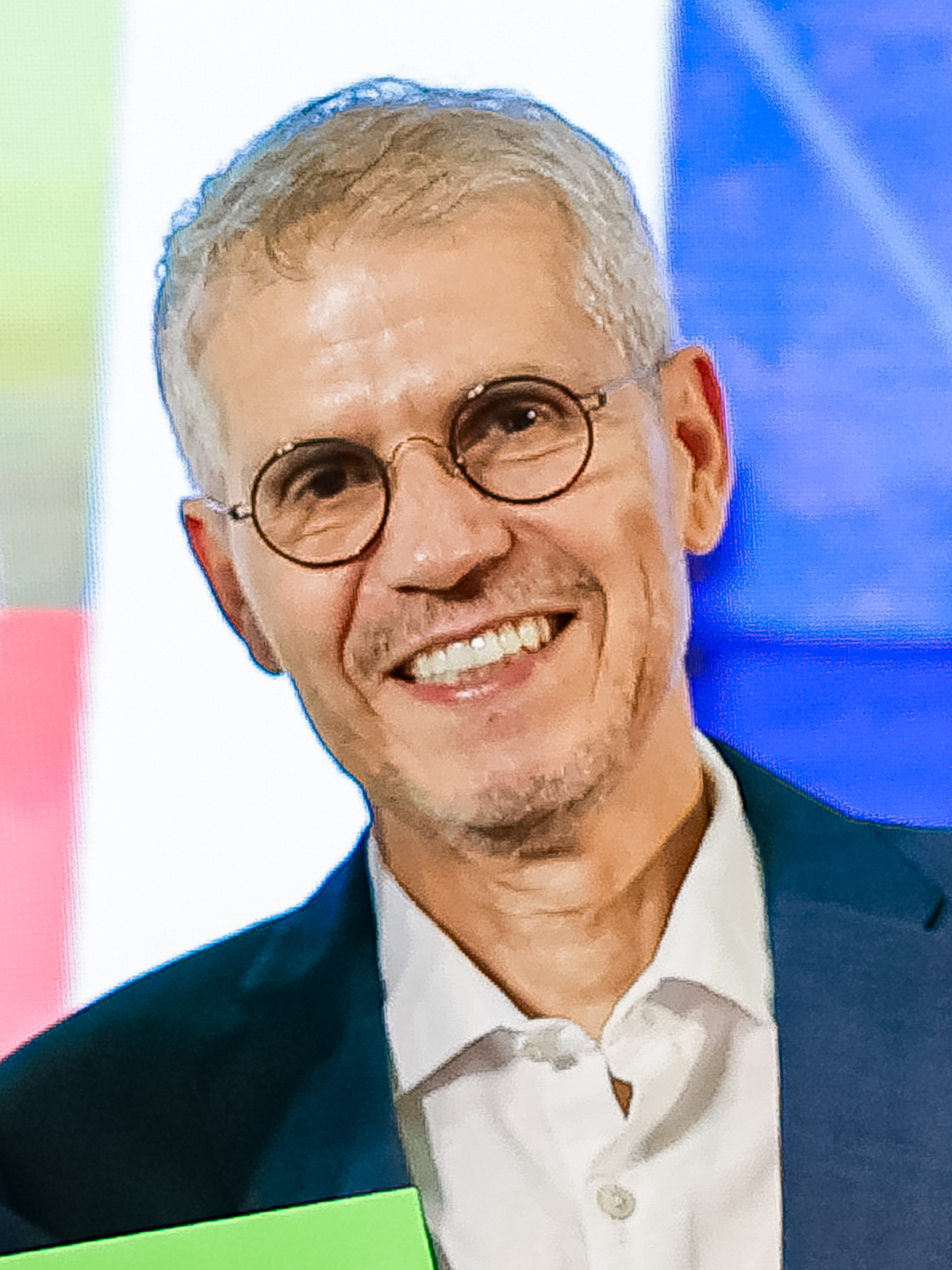
- Palmeira in 2024

Chief Minister of the Secretariat of Social Communication
- Incumbent
- Assumed office January 14, 2025
- President: Luiz Inácio Lula da Silva
- Preceded by: Paulo Pimenta

Personal details
- Born: Sidônio Cardoso Palmeira; March 1, 1958 (age 68) Vitória da Conquista, Bahia, Brazil
- Education: Federal University of Bahia
- Profession: Advertising executive

Sidônio Cardoso Palmeira (born March 1, 1958) is a Brazilian engineer and advertising executive, currently serving as Chief Minister of Brazil's Secretariat of Social Communication since January 14, 2025.

== Biography ==
Sidônio Palmeira was born in Vitória da Conquista on March 1, 1958, and graduated in engineering from the Federal University of Bahia, where he participated in the student movement and served as vice-president of the Central Student Directory between 1981 and 1982, on a ticket formed together with Lídice da Mata.

He began working in communications in 1992, when he joined the campaign team of Lídice da Mata (PSDB) for the mayoral election of Salvador that year.

He participated in the gubernatorial campaigns of Workers' Party (PT) candidates Jaques Wagner and Rui Costa in Bahia's 2006, 2010, 2014, and 2018 elections. He also worked on the presidential campaigns of Fernando Haddad and Luiz Inácio Lula da Silva in the 2018 and 2022 elections, respectively.

Between 2023 and 2024, although not yet part of Lula's government, he helped prepare the president's speeches and organize party events.

On January 14, 2025, he was appointed and sworn in as Chief Minister of the Secretariat of Social Communication of the Presidency of the Republic, succeeding Paulo Pimenta. This is analyzed as a way for Lula da Silva to embark on a more ambitious communication on the government's action in the run-up to the 2026 elections.

Political offices
Preceded by Paulo Pimenta	Secretariat of Social Communication; 2025-present	Succeeded by Incumbent
