= Valdeci Oliveira =

Brazilian politician (born 1957)

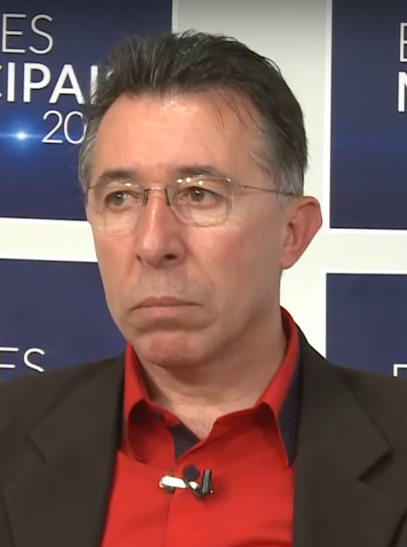

State deputy of Rio Grande do Sul
- Incumbent
- Assumed office 1 February 2011

President of the Legislative Assembly of Rio Grande do Sul
- In office 1 February 2022 – 1 February 2023
- Preceded by: Gabriel Souza
- Succeeded by: Vilmar Zanchin

Mayor of Santa Maria
- In office 1 January 2001 – 1 January 2009
- Preceded by: Osvaldo Nascimento da Silva
- Succeeded by: Cezar Schirmer

Federal Deputy of Rio Grande do Sul
- In office 2 January 1997 – 1 January 2001

Councilman of Santa Maria
- In office 1989–1996

Personal details
- Born: Antônio Valdeci Oliveira de Oliveira; 7 September 1957 (age 69) Dilermando de Aguiar, Rio Grande do Sul, Brazil
- Party: PT (1986–present)
- Spouse: Elaine Oliveira
- Children: 2

Antônio Valdeci Oliveira de Oliveira (born 7 September 1957) is a Brazilian politician affiliated with the Workers' Party, and is the second vice-president of the Legislative Assembly of Rio Grande do Sul, having previously been the president of the institution. He was previously the mayor of the city of Santa Maria from 2001 to 2009.

== Biography ==
Oliveira was born on 7 September 1957, in the locality of São José da Porteirinha, a former district of Santa Maria that is now the municipality of Dilermando de Aguiar. His parents were Joreci and Lenir, who were farmers. He is married to Elaine Oliveira, and has two daughters: Tamara and Diossana.

A former metalworker, farmer, and merchant, he began his political career working with social movements. In the 1980s, he was the president of the Metalworkers' Union in Santa Maria and the state vice-president of regional Central Única dos Trabalhadores (CUT).

In 1986, he became a member of the PT and was elected a councilman in Santa Maria. Reelected in 1992 with the largest vote share in the city, he ran to become a federal deputy in 1994, but was elected as a first substitute. In 1997, he became a federal deputy, being elected again in 1998. In 2000, he won the mayoral election for Santa Maria, and was reelected in 2004, becoming the first mayor to be reelected in the city's history. In 2006, he was selected by the national PT to coordinate president Luiz Inácio Lula da Silva's reelection campaign in Rio Grande do Sul. After finishing his second term as mayor, he was elected as a state deputy in 2010 with 64,163 votes. The majority of his vote share came from his hometown of Santa Maria, becoming the most voted for candidate in the city.
