= TV Brasil =

Public broadcaster in Brazil

- Logo used since 2023
- Type: State-owned; Public broadcasting television network
- Country: Brazil
- Broadcast area: 90% of national territory
- Stations: List: TV Brasil Rio de Janeiro; TV Brasil Capital; TV Brasil São Paulo; TV Brasil Maranhão
- Headquarters: Rio de Janeiro, Rio de Janeiro, Brasília, Brazil

Programming
- Language: Portuguese
- Picture format: 480i (SDTV); 1080i (HDTV)

Ownership
- Owner: Empresa Brasil de Comunicação
- Key people: Andre Basbaum (president)

History
- Launched: 2 December 2007; 18 years ago
- Founder: Federal government of Brazil
- Replaced: TVE Brasil

Links
- Website: tvbrasil.ebc.com.br

Availability

Terrestrial
- Digital terrestrial television: List: 15 UHF (Brasília and Goiânia); 17 UHF (Belo Horizonte); 20 UHF (Vitória); 24 UHF (Salvador and Teresina); 26 UHF (Cuiabá); 28 UHF (Fortaleza); 30 UHF (Porto Alegre); 36 UHF (Curitiba); 40 UHF (Recife); 41 UHF (Rio de Janeiro); 48 UHF (Natal); 63 UHF (Florianópolis and São Paulo)

TV Brasil is a Brazilian public television network owned by Empresa Brasil de Comunicação. Its main headquarters are in Brasília, DF and Rio de Janeiro, RJ, with owned-and-operated stations in São Paulo, SP and in São Luís, MA, as well as 21 states where its affiliated broadcasters operate, all components of the Rede Pública de Televisão.

== History ==
TV Brasil originated from a decree which created Empresa Brasil de Comunicação, the network's maintainer, published on 24 December 2007 in the Diário Oficial da União, Brazil's official gazette. It was generated from the fusion of Empresa Brasileira de Comunicação - Radiobrás and Associação de Comunicação Educativa Roquette Pinto, responsible for the maintenance of the now defunct TVE Brasil - which was replaced by TV Brasil in several cities. The lack of equipment restricted TV Brasil's launching to only three cities (Rio de Janeiro, Brasília and São Luís). Its programming, however, is also available through its official website and cable and satellite television.

In 2019, following the election of Jair Bolsonaro as president, TV NBR was shut down and merged into TV Brasil as TV Brasil 2. During the presidency, after initial threats to privatize the EBC, TV Brasil and other government-owned media outlets largely became propaganda organs for Bolsonaro's government. News programmes avoided giving airtime to political opponents, and programmes were faced with censorship to conform with the party line, especially within topics such as violence against women, Indigenous peoples, and LGBT rights. Live coverage of media appearances by Bolsonaro frequently interrupted TV Brasil's regularly scheduled programmes, with an estimated 193 hours of such coverage airing between August 2021 and July 2022.

After the election of Luiz Inácio Lula da Silva to a second presidency in 2022, the incoming Secretary of Social Communication Paulo Pimenta stated that there were plans to return TV Brasil to a public service format with a focus on education and cultural programmes, and for government-related programmes to be split back out into a second broadcaster. Lula stated that he wanted TV Brasil to be comparable to other public service broadcasters such as the BBC, and target a younger audience. On 24 July 2023, the reorganization was completed with the launch of the new government media platform Canal Gov.

== Programming ==
TV Brasil affiliated stations broadcast four hours of regional programming each day. The network also airs Brazilian films and programmes produced by other public television channels. Its schedule has been organized into five daily programming streams: children, animation, audiovisual, citizenship and sports.

Franklin Martins, then Secretary of Social Communication, stated that TV Brasil's programming was not yet fully defined and could still undergo late changes. He also said that he intended to use public opinion polls to help shape the network's programming.

== Logo evolutions ==
Logo from 2008 to 2009.

Logo from 2009 to 2012.

Logo from 2012 to 2019.

Logo from 2019 to 2023.

Logo since 2023.

== Stations ==
Among self-owned and affiliated stations, TV Brasil reaches over 30 municipalities throughout all regions of Brazil. On the rest of the country, TV Brasil's availability is limited to satellite and cable television. Its live programming can also be watched on the network's official website.
