= Cezar Schirmer =

Brazilian lawyer, professor and politician (born 1952)

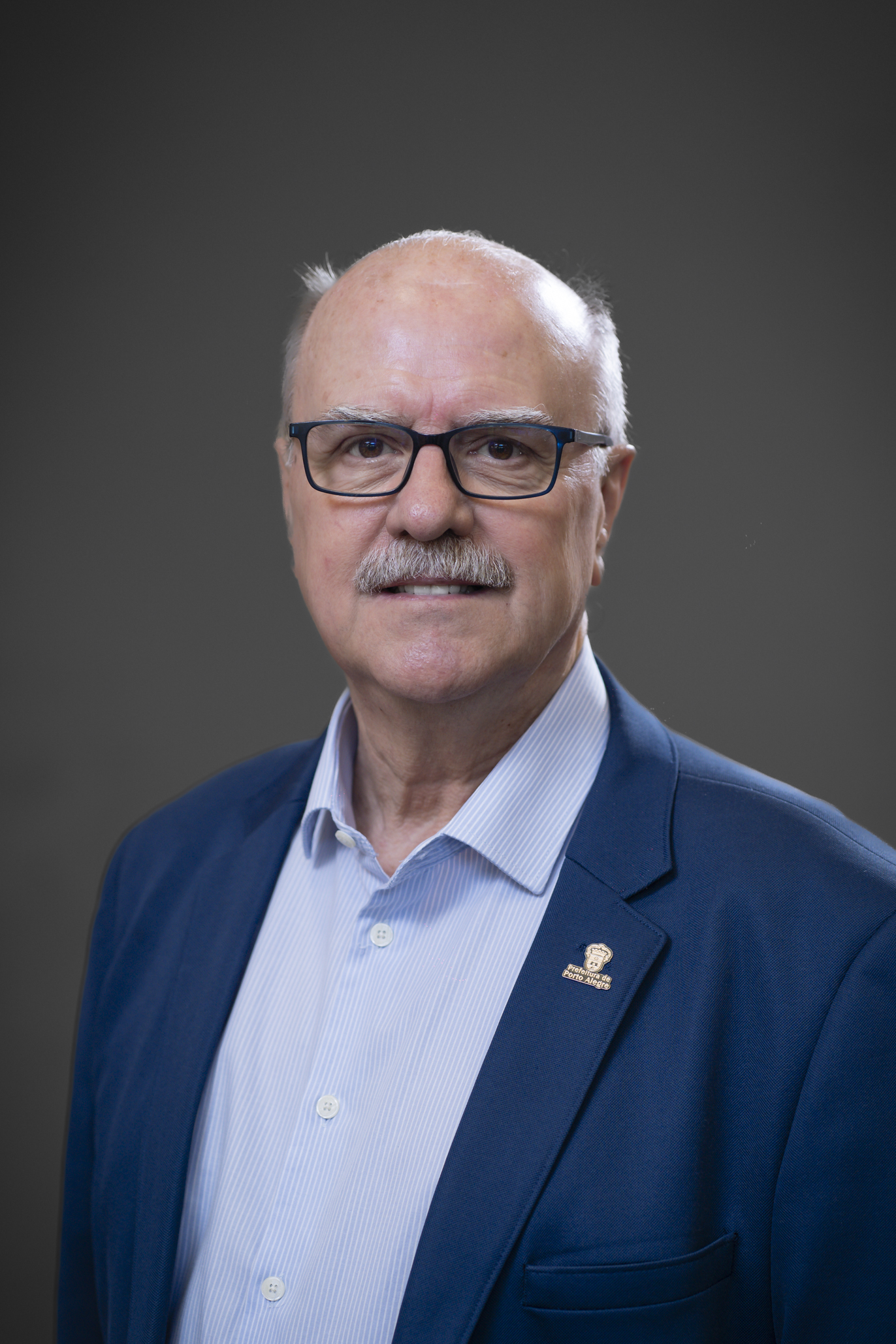
- Schirmer in 2025

City Councilor of Porto Alegre
- Incumbent
- Assumed office 1 January 2021

State Secretary of Public Safety of Rio Grande do Sul
- In office 2 September 2016 – 1 January 2019
- Succeeded by: Ranolfo Vieira Júnior

Mayor of Santa Maria
- In office 1 January 2009 – 6 September 2016
- Preceded by: Valdeci Oliveira
- Succeeded by: José Haidar Farret
Further offices held
Federal deputy for Rio Grande do Sul
In office
1 February 1999 – 1 January 2009
State Secretary of Agriculture and Supply of Rio Grande do Sul
In office
1995–1998
Extraordinary State Secretary for Subjects of the Chief of Staff of Rio Grande do Sul
In office
1989–1989
State Secretary of Finance of Rio Grande do Sul
In office
1987–1989
State deputy of Rio Grande do Sul
In office
1975–1995

Personal details
- Born: Cezar Augusto Schirmer; 28 June 1952 (age 74) Santa Maria, Rio Grande do Sul, Brazil
- Party: MDB (1972–present)
- Spouse: Fátima Schirmer
- Children: 3
- Education: Federal University of Santa Maria

Cezar Augusto Schirmer (born 23 February 1952) is a Brazilian lawyer, university professor, and politician who is affiliated with the Brazilian Democratic Movement (MDB). He became internationally known for having been the mayor of the city of Santa Maria during the time that the municipality allowed the nightclub Kiss to operate. The nightclub caught fire in 2013, causing the deaths of 242 people.

He later became the State Secretary of Public Safety of the state of Rio Grande do Sul during the government of José Ivo Sartori. He became the federal Secretary of the Creative Economy and the Special Secretary of Culture, with both posts being under the Ministry of Citizenship, during the Jair Bolsonaro administration. He is currently the municipal secretary of Planning and Strategic Subjects of the city of Porto Alegre, as well as a councilman in the city.

== Biography ==
=== Early life ===
Schirmer was born on 23 February 1952 in Santa Maria. Schirmer graduated with a law degree from the Federal University of Santa Maria. Afterwards, he became a university professor.

=== Political career ===
Schirmer made his political debut in the 1970s, affiliating himself with the MDB. He became the youngest councilman to be elected to Santa Maria's city council. He went on to be elected a state deputy at 22 years old, becoming one of the youngest in the country. He was elected to five terms as a state deputy and later became a federal deputy from 1999 to 2009. He was the leader for the MDB in the Chamber of Deputies.

Schirmer was also the state Finance Secretary, secretary of the Chief of Staff, and Agriculture Secretary.

He ran, in 1992, to become the mayor of Porto Alegre, being defeated in 1992 by Tarso Genro of the Workers’ Party (PT). He also ran to become the mayor of Santa Maria in 2000 and 2004, being beaten both times by Valdeci Oliveira.

=== Mayor of Santa Maria ===
Schirmer ran for a third time as mayor during the 2008 mayoral elections and was elected with 80,989 votes. He ran with José Haidar Farret as his vice-mayor. During the 2012, he was re-elected with 54.76%.

Under his administration as the mayor of Santa Maria, the Kiss nightclub fire occurred in January 2013, which left 242 young people dead and more than 630 injured. Schirmer received criticisms for his conduct after the tragedy and due to suspicions that he had been involved with the actions of the public servants around the time of the tragedy. He was investigated for administrative impropriety during this time period, but the case was dismissed by the Public Prosecutor's Office.

On 2 September 2016, he assumed the position as the state Secretary of Public Safety of Rio Grande do Sul, leading to him resigning from the mayorship.

=== Later activities ===
In 2020, Schirmer moved to Porto Alegre and ran to become a city councilor the MDB in the capital. During the course of the 2020 municipal elections, he became the most voted candidate from his party in the city, and was elected.

He has been the secretary of Planning and Strategic Subjects of Porto Alegre since 2 January 2023.

== Personal life ==
Schirmer is married to Fátima Schirmer, and they have three daughters: Maria Augusta, Maria Luiza, and Ana Julia.
