= TV Macapá =

Macapá, Amapá; Brazil
- Channels: Digital: 34 (UHF); Virtual: 4
- Branding: TV Macapá

Programming
- Affiliations: Rede Bandeirantes

Ownership
- Owner: Organizações José Alcolumbre; (Televisão Macapaense Ltda.)
- Sister stations: TV Amazônia Macapá

History
- First air date: 1997
- Former channel numbers: Analog: 4 (VHF, 1997–2018)

Technical information
- Licensing authority: ANATEL
- ERP: 5 kW
- Transmitter coordinates: 00°01′12″S 51°04′51.5″W

Links
- Public license information: Profile

TV Macapá (channel 4) is a Band-affiliated television station owned by Organizações José Alcolumbre, which also owns SBT affiliate TV Amazônia.

== History ==
The station was founded in 1997 and has been a Band affiliate since its inception.

On May 31, 2006, the city's media landscape was affected by Operation Alecto, causing the jailing of its owner, and four other people. The case was hidden by the Brazilian press. The Alcolumbre family has been accused of using their media outlets for environmental devastation.

In August 2021, the mayor of Kourou François Ringuet (of neighboring French Guiana) visited the station's facilities.

As of 2022, Josiel Alcolumbre became its owner.

== Technical information ==
Virtual channel	Digital channel	Aspect ratio	Content
4.1	34 UHF	1080i	Main TV Macapá programming / Band
