= Secretariat of Social Communication =

- Portuguese: Secretaria de Comunicação Social

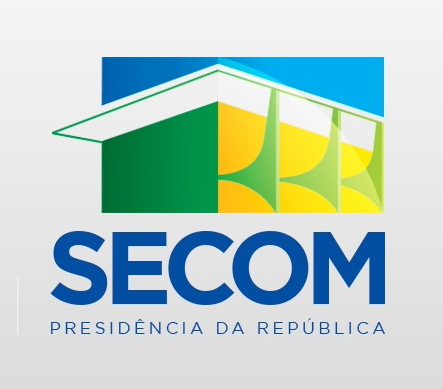

Agency overview
- Formed: 7 June 1979; 46 years ago
- Type: Ministry
- Jurisdiction: Federal government of Brazil
- Headquarters: Planalto Palace, Praça dos Três Poderes; Brasília, Federal District
- Agency executives: Sidônio Palmeira, Chief-Minister; Ricardo Zamorra, Executive-Secretary; José Chrispiniano Júnior, Secretary of Press; Brunna Alfaia, Secretary of Analysis, Strategy and Political Affairs; Mariana Seixas, Secretary of Advertising and Sponsorship; Emanuel Hassen de Jesus, Secretary of Institutional Communication; Ricardo Stuckert, Secretary of Production and Publishing of Audiovisual Content; João Caldeira Brant, Secretary of Digital Policy
- Website: www.gov.br/secom/

The Secretariat of Social Communication (Portuguese: Secretaria de Comunicação Social, Secom) is a cabinet-level federal ministry in Brazil. With a Ministry status, it is responsible for the release of funds and management of advertising contracts signed by the Federal Government.

With the ministry reform promoted by president Luiz Inácio Lula da Silva in 2007, the Secretariat incorporated the Secretariat of Press and Spokesperson, which is responsible for the relationship between the government and the media. This coincidence of attributions was criticized by external analysts.

== History ==
Between the end of the Gushiken administration and the 2007 ministry reform, Secom was an under-secretariat under the Secretariat-General of the Presidency. However, after the 2019 reform under the Bolsonaro administration, Secom became part of the Secretariat of Government.

On 10 June 2020, the Special Secretariat of Social Communication of the Secretariat of Government of the Presidency was extinct by Provisional Measure 980/2020, having its attributions merged into the re-created Ministry of Communications. The Secretariat was restored by the conversion of the Provisional Measure into Law 14074/2020.

== List of secretaries ==
No.	Portrait	Secretary	Took office	Left office	Time in office	Party	President
1	Said Farhat	Said Farhat (1920–2014)	7 June 1979	18 December 1980	1 year, 194 days	Independent	João Figueiredo (ARENA)
2	Sérgio Amaral	Sérgio Amaral (born 1944)	1 January 1995	17 May 1999	4 years, 136 days	Independent	Fernando Henrique Cardoso (PSDB)
3	Andrea Matarazzo	Andrea Matarazzo (born 1956)	17 May 1999	10 December 2001	2 years, 207 days	PSDB	Fernando Henrique Cardoso (PSDB)
4	João Roberto Vieira da Costa	João Roberto Vieira da Costa (born 1963)	10 December 2001	1 January 2003	24 years, 6 days	Independent	Fernando Henrique Cardoso (PSDB)
5	Luiz Gushiken	Luiz Gushiken (1950–2013)	1 January 2003	22 July 2005	2 years, 202 days	PT	Luiz Inácio Lula da Silva (PT)
6	Luiz Tadeu Rigo	Luiz Tadeu Rigo (born 1957)	1 August 2005	1 January 2007	1 year, 153 days	Independent	Luiz Inácio Lula da Silva (PT)
7	Helena Chagas	Helena Chagas (born 1961)	1 January 2011	31 January 2014	3 years, 30 days	Independent	Dilma Rousseff (PT)
8	Thomas Traumann	Thomas Traumann (born 1967)	3 February 2014	25 March 2015	1 year, 50 days	Independent	Dilma Rousseff (PT)
9	Edinho Silva	Edinho Silva (born 1965)	31 March 2015	12 May 2016	1 year, 42 days	PT	Dilma Rousseff (PT)
10	Márcio Freitas	Márcio Freitas	24 May 2016	1 January 2019	2 years, 222 days	Independent	Jair Bolsonaro (PSL)
11	Floriano Barbosa de Amorim Neto	Floriano Barbosa de Amorim Neto (born 1961)	1 January 2019	9 April 2019	98 days	Independent	Jair Bolsonaro (PSL)
12	Fábio Wajngarten	Fábio Wajngarten (born 1975)	9 April 2019	11 March 2021	1 year, 336 days	Independent	Jair Bolsonaro (Ind)
13	André de Sousa Costa	André de Sousa Costa	16 April 2021	1 January 2023	1 year, 260 days	Independent	Jair Bolsonaro (Ind)
14	Paulo Pimenta	Paulo Pimenta (born 1965)	1 January 2023	15 May 2024	1 year, 135 days	PT	Luiz Inácio Lula da Silva (PT)
15	Laércio Portela	Laércio Portela; Acting	15 May 2024	10 September 2024	118 days	Independent	Luiz Inácio Lula da Silva (PT)
16	Paulo Pimenta	Paulo Pimenta (born 1965)	10 September 2024	7 January 2025	119 days	PT	Luiz Inácio Lula da Silva (PT)
17	Sidônio Palmeira	Sidônio Palmeira (born 1958)	7 January 2025	Incumbent	343 days	PT	Luiz Inácio Lula da Silva (PT)

== Controversies ==
Writing to The Intercept Brasil, João Filho questioned the raise of public expenditure to RecordTV and other TV and radio broadcasters which owners were close to president Jair Bolsonaro. Prior to his administration, the public expenditure to broadcasters was spent according to their respective audience levels, but the method was cancelled with no reason.

On 15 January 2020, it was revealed by Folha de S. Paulo that Fábio Wajngarten, head of the Secretariat, received through a company which he's a partner, money from TV broadcasters and advertisement agencies which has contracts signed with Bolsonaro administration. Among them are Rede Bandeirantes and RecordTV. This fact was analyzed by Reporters Without Borders, which analyzed the attacks of Bolsonaro against the press. In June 2020, an investigation published by Agência Pública confirmed that Evangelical broadcasters and pastors supporters of the government were the ones who most received public expenditures from the Secretariat, which were at least 30 million reais. The majority of the money was destined to RecordTV, the Universal Church of the Kingdom of God and the International Grace of God Church.

In July 2020, another investigation by Agência Pública shows that the government, through the Secretariat, sponsored advertising in YouTube of the Social Security Reform in child content, Bolsonaro supporters, religious and fake news channels.

In a complaint filled by the Federal Prosecutor Office of Citizen Rights, the former secretary, Fábio Wajngarten, was charged by the crimes of apology for crime and criminal in the Federal Justice of the Federal District due to tweets praising crimes committed by the Brazilian military during the Araguaia Guerrilla and to Major Sebastião Curió.

== See also ==
- Cabinet of Brazil
