= Praça da Liberdade =

Public square in Belo Horizonte, Brazil

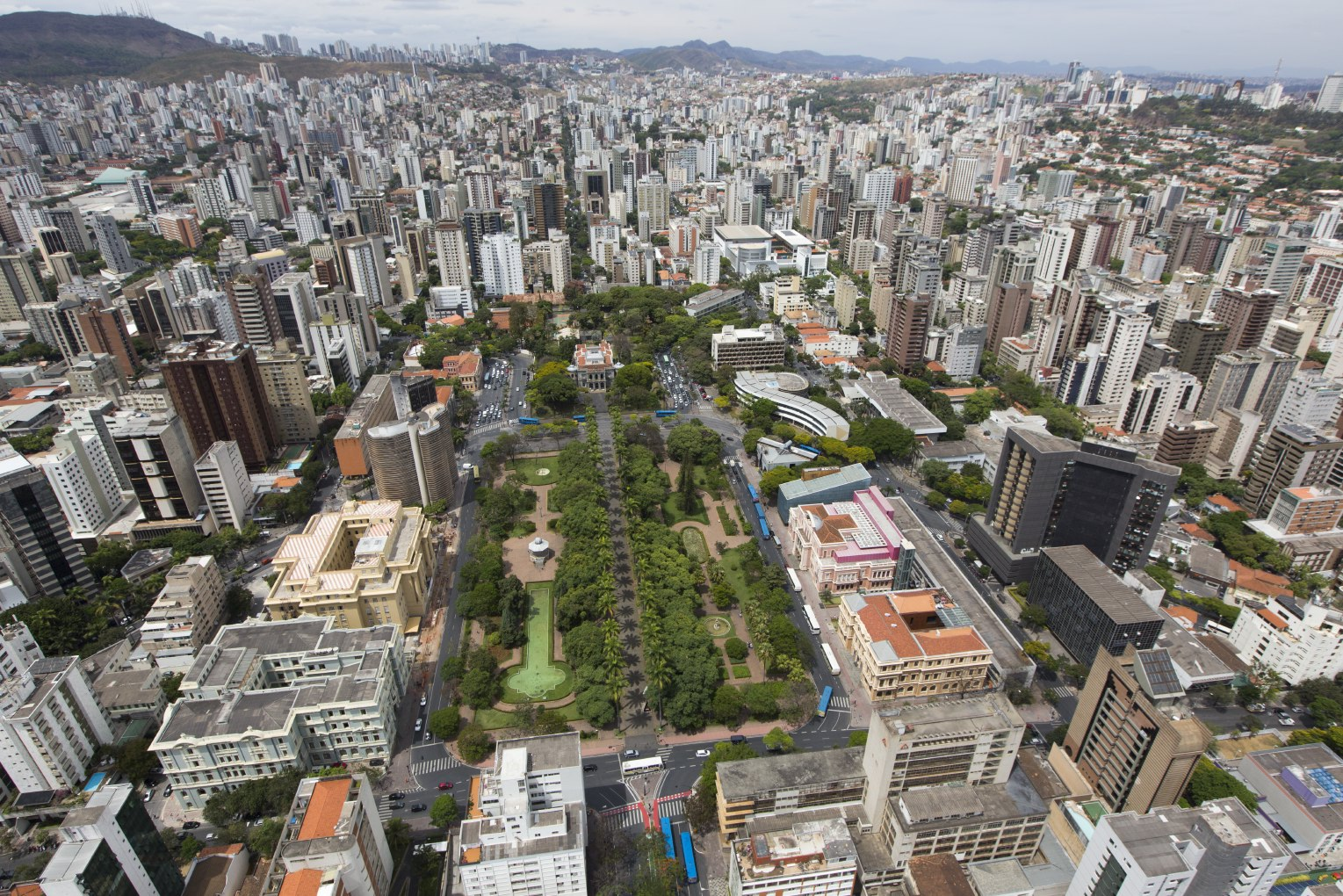
- Aerial view of Praça da Liberdade in Belo Horizonte
- Type: Public square
- Features: Gardens, fountains, reflecting pools, a bandstand, monuments, and an avenue of royal palms
- Designer: Paul Villon (original landscaping); Reynaldo Dierberger / Dierberger & Cia. (1920 redesign)
- Construction: 1895–1897
- Completion: Gardens completed in 1905
- Opening: 1897
- Architectural styles: Eclectic, Art Deco, modernist, and postmodern buildings surrounding the square
- Named for: Liberty
- Location: Savassi, Belo Horizonte, Minas Gerais, Brazil
- Address: Bias Fortes Avenue, Brazil Avenue, and João Pinheiro Avenue; Belo Horizonte, Minas Gerais, Brazil
- Parking: No dedicated parking
- Coordinates: 19°55′55.44″S 43°56′17.03″W
- Website: Official tourism page

Praça da Liberdade is a public square and an architectural and landscape ensemble (Note: An architectural and landscape ensemble is an area in which buildings, gardens, paths, monuments, and other urban features are understood as parts of a single composition. At Praça da Liberdade, the square and the surrounding buildings form such an ensemble.) in Belo Horizonte, Minas Gerais, Brazil. It is located in the Savassi area, at the junction of Bias Fortes, Brasil, Cristóvão Colombo, and João Pinheiro avenues.

The square was laid out between 1895 and 1897 during the construction of Belo Horizonte as the new capital of Minas Gerais. Set on a leveled hill within the city's original planned area, it was conceived as the ceremonial setting for the Palácio da Liberdade and the first state department buildings. (Note: In Brazil, a state department, or secretaria de Estado, is an agency of a state government responsible for an area of public administration, such as education, finance, public safety, or public works. It is broadly comparable to a cabinet department at the state level.) Its gardens, avenues, fountains, bandstand, monuments, and surrounding public buildings formed the main government complex of the new capital.

Around the square, the original eclectic buildings (Note: In architecture, eclecticism combines references from different periods and traditions, such as Neoclassical, Renaissance, or Baroque elements. It was widely used in Brazilian public buildings in the late 19th and early 20th centuries.) were later joined by works in other architectural styles. The Cristo Rei Archbishop's Palace introduced an Art Deco presence in the late 1930s; modernist buildings, including the Niemeyer Building and the Luiz de Bessa State Public Library, were added in the mid-20th century; and the postmodern Rainha da Sucata Building added another layer to the ensemble late in the century.

The architectural and landscape ensemble was granted state heritage protection by the Instituto Estadual do Patrimônio Histórico e Artístico de Minas Gerais in 1977. (Note: In Brazil, a property that is formally listed, or tombado, receives legal protection because of its historical, artistic, cultural, architectural, or landscape value. The designation does not prevent the place from being used, but changes are subject to special preservation rules.) After the state government moved to the Cidade Administrativa de Minas Gerais (Note: The Cidade Administrativa de Minas Gerais is a government complex built to bring state agencies together outside Belo Horizonte's traditional center. Its opening changed the use of several former public buildings around Praça da Liberdade.) in 2010, several former government buildings surrounding the square were adapted as museums, archives, libraries, cultural centers, and educational spaces, forming the Praça da Liberdade Cultural Circuit, later renamed Circuito Liberdade.

== History ==
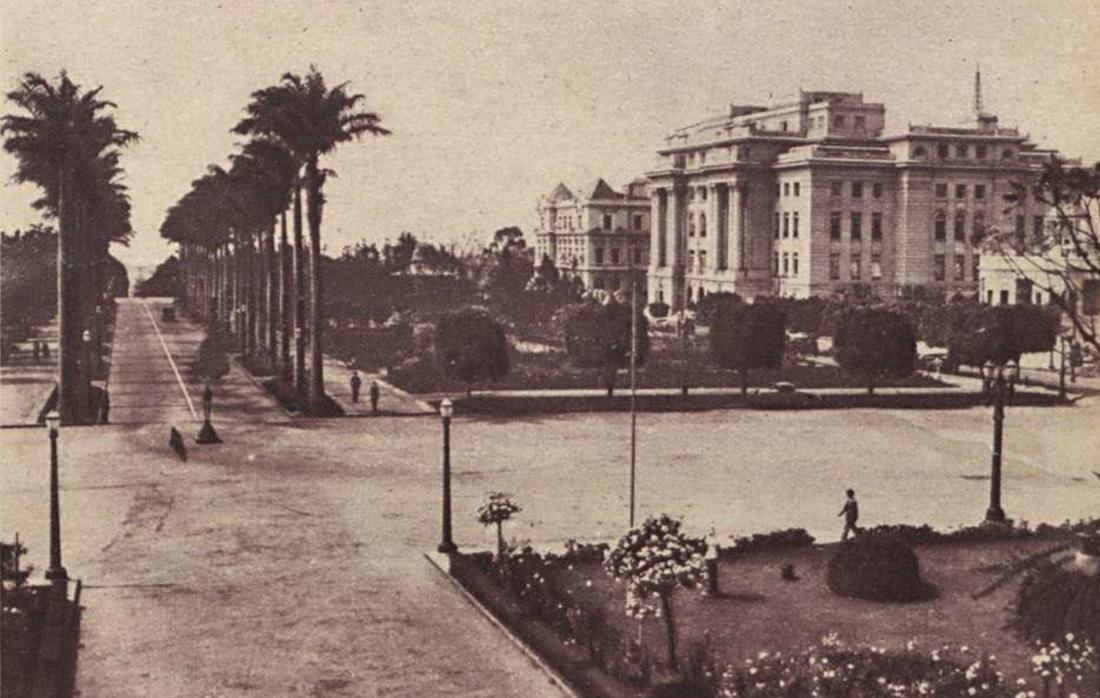
View of the square in 1935.

Praça da Liberdade was created alongside Belo Horizonte, the planned capital (Note: A planned capital is a city designed before construction to serve as a seat of government. Belo Horizonte was one of Brazil's earliest planned capitals and was built to replace Ouro Preto, whose mountainous geography restricted urban and administrative expansion.) built to replace Ouro Preto as the seat of the Minas Gerais government. Laid out between 1895 and 1897, it was conceived as the civic center of the new city. A hill was leveled for the Palácio da Liberdade and the first state department buildings. At the upper end of what is now João Pinheiro Avenue, the palace dominated the landscape and commanded a broad view of the capital as it began to take shape.

The square was already part of Belo Horizonte's public life when the city was inaugurated. On December 12, 1897, it hosted celebrations marking the opening of the new capital, while its gardens still followed the original layout designed by French landscape architect Paul Villon. The cornerstone of the Palácio da Liberdade had been laid on September 7, 1895, but the building was not completed until 1898, one year after the city's inauguration. Buildings for the state administration were erected around it, establishing the square's close association with the Minas Gerais government from the beginning.

The arrival of the new administrative center also reshaped the neighboring area. Many officials and civil servants transferred from Ouro Preto settled near the square and the government buildings. Their concentration gave the surrounding neighborhood its name, Funcionários, meaning "civil servants".

Buildings from this first phase were largely eclectic, with Neoclassical elements commonly used in official architecture around the turn of the 20th century. One example is the present-day Minas Gerais Public Archive building. Designed by the New Capital Construction Commission, it was built in 1897 as the residence of the state secretary of finance and was later adapted to house the archives.

The gardens were completed in 1905 according to Villon's design, which was influenced by English landscape gardening. The bandstand (Note: Bandstands are small open structures commonly found in Brazilian squares and used for band performances, speeches, and public gatherings. They played an important role in urban life before modern sound systems and large stages became widespread.) also dates to the square's early years. Its design has been associated with Edgar Nascentes Coelho in 1904 and Francisco Izidoro Monteiro in 1909. More than a decorative feature, it brought music, social gatherings, and everyday leisure into the formal civic setting.

In 1920, Praça da Liberdade underwent a major redesign in preparation for a visit to Belo Horizonte by King Albert I of Belgium and Queen Elisabeth. The São Paulo firm Dierberger & Cia. replaced Villon's freer, organic layout with a geometric composition inspired by French gardens, particularly those of the Palace of Versailles. Terraces, reflecting pools, fountains, sculptures, and beds containing a variety of plants were added. The central avenue of royal palms, directing the eye toward the Palácio da Liberdade, became one of the square's best-known features.

The landscape around the square continued to change throughout the 20th century. New buildings introduced different styles alongside the eclectic architecture of the square's early decades. The Cristo Rei Archbishop's Palace, designed by Raffaello Berti and built in 1937, introduced Art Deco to the ensemble. In the 1950s and 1960s, modernist architecture arrived in the form of the Niemeyer Building and the Luiz de Bessa State Public Library, both designed by Oscar Niemeyer. Near the end of the century, the postmodern Tancredo Neves Building, popularly known as the Rainha da Sucata Building, added another phase to the area's architectural history.

In 1977, the architectural and landscape ensemble of Praça da Liberdade was granted state heritage protection by the Instituto Estadual do Patrimônio Histórico e Artístico de Minas Gerais. The protected area includes the gardens, avenues, lakes, fountains, monuments, and herms, (Note: A herm is a type of marker or pedestal, usually topped by a sculpted bust or head. In squares and gardens, herms are often used as monuments honoring a person.) as well as the Palácio da Liberdade, the Palácio dos Despachos, the former state department buildings, and several surrounding façades and interiors. The designation recognized that the square's significance lay not in any single building or garden, but in the ensemble formed by the landscape, government architecture, public art, and later additions.

In 2010, the state government left the area and moved its headquarters to the Cidade Administrativa de Minas Gerais. The former government buildings surrounding the square were then given new functions, chiefly cultural ones. This transformation created the Praça da Liberdade Cultural Circuit, later renamed Circuito Liberdade.

== Landscaping and urban function ==
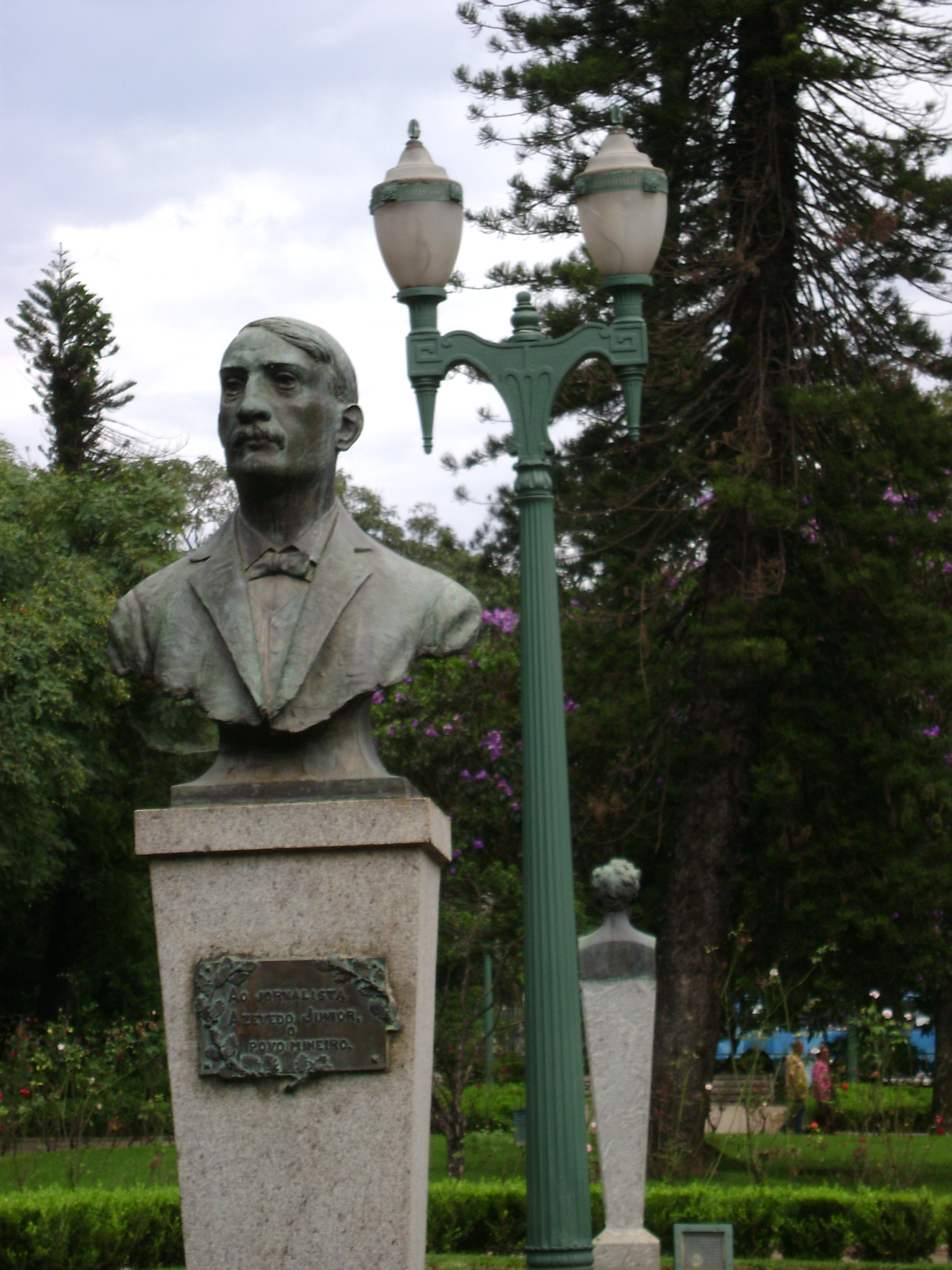
Bust of journalist Azevedo Júnior, unveiled in the square in 1923.

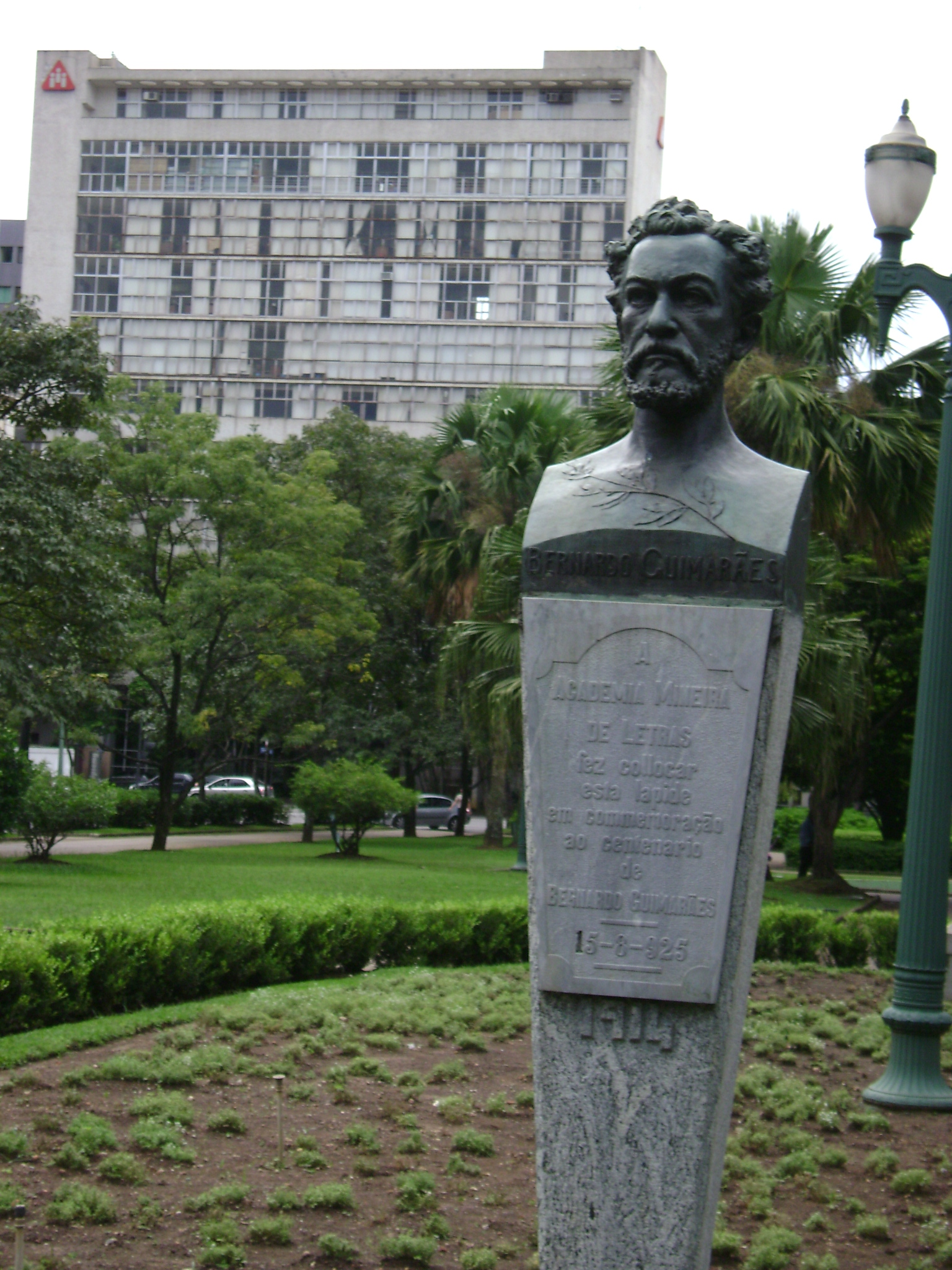
Bust of Bernardo Guimarães.

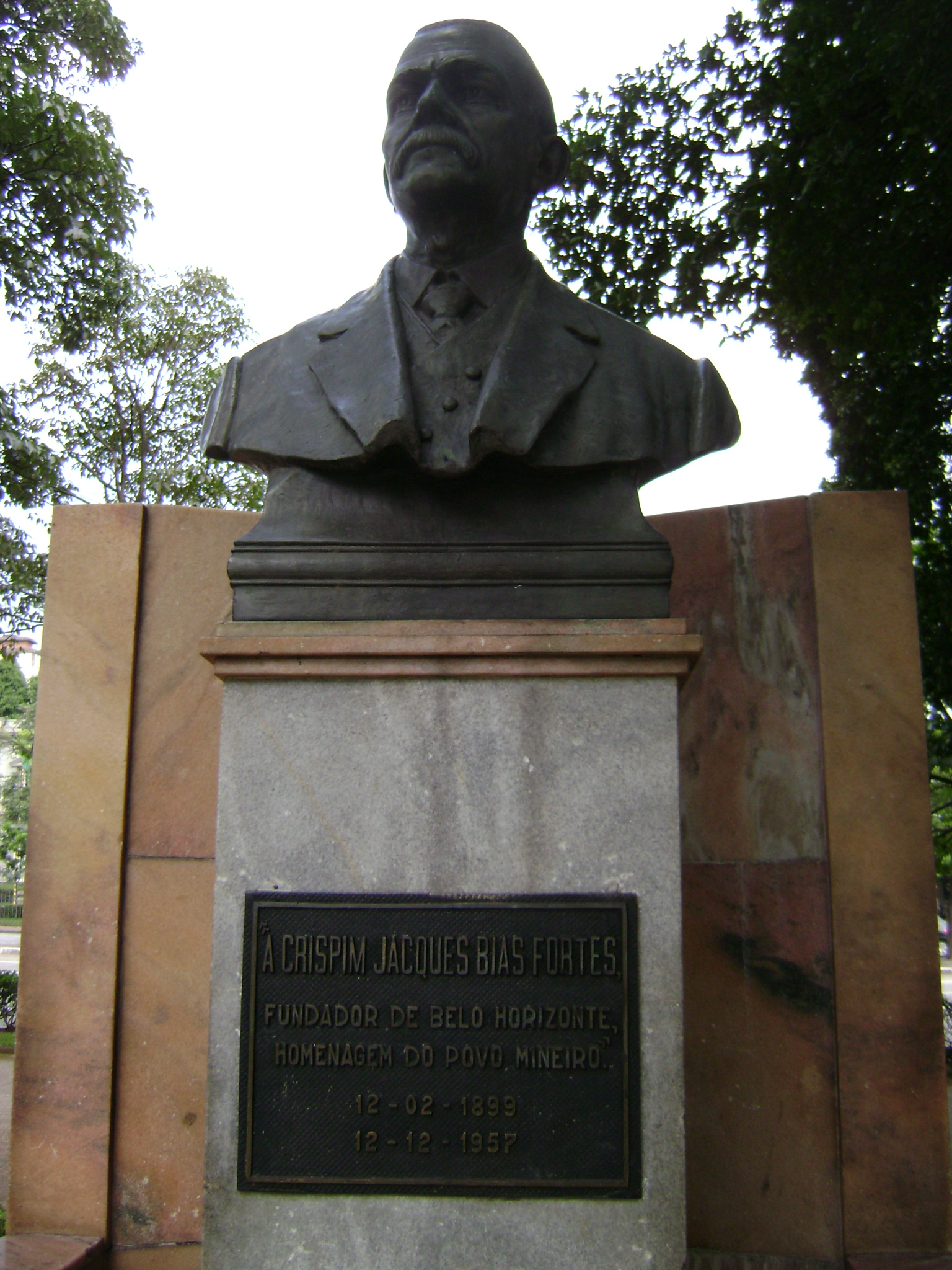
Bust of Bias Fortes.

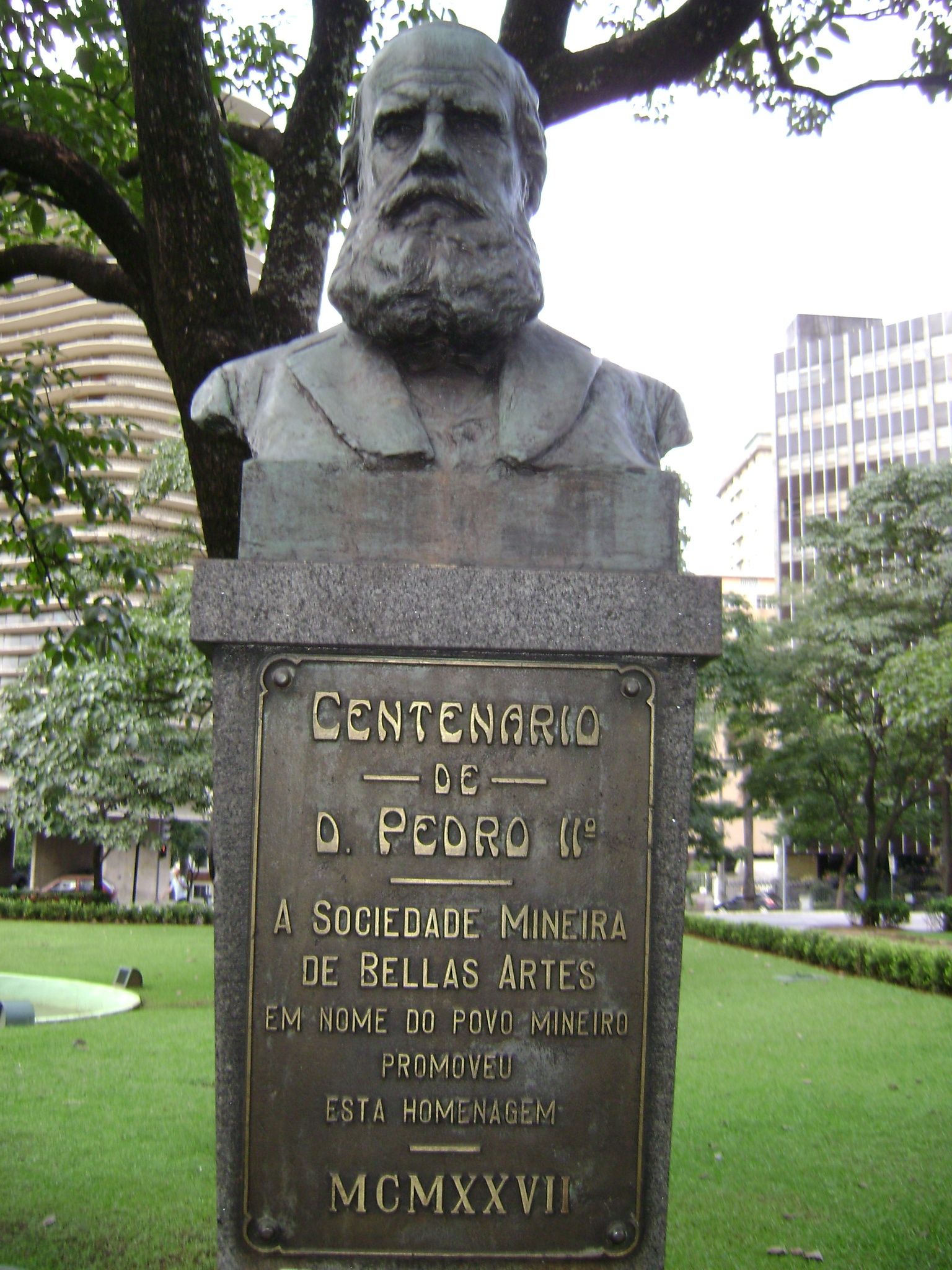
Bust of Pedro II of Brazil.

Praça da Liberdade was planned as the formal forecourt of the Palácio da Liberdade and the state department buildings, on a leveled hill within the original planned city. Its position gave the square a ceremonial character. From João Pinheiro Avenue, the main axis of the gardens opens toward the former seat of the state government, framing the Palácio da Liberdade as the focal point of the ensemble.

The square's present design is largely the result of the 1920 redesign, which replaced Paul Villon's organic landscaping with a more regular composition. The central axis, reflecting pools, fountains, terraces, sculptures, and avenue of royal palms organize the view toward the Palácio da Liberdade and reinforce the ensemble's ceremonial character.

Although the central axis gives the square a formal character, the gardens were also designed for everyday use. The avenue of royal palms connects João Pinheiro Avenue with the Palácio da Liberdade, while fountains, reflecting pools, lawns, benches, shaded paths, and the bandstand provide places for rest, conversation, music, and public gatherings. The bandstand connects the square with the early history of public music in Belo Horizonte. In the capital's first years, civic festivals, Carnival celebrations, and band performances often used temporary structures. Praça da Liberdade and Praça Rio Branco later received some of the city's first permanent bandstands in major public spaces.

The square has long served both as an everyday public space and as a formal setting for the buildings around it. In her master's thesis at the State University of Campinas, Junia Marques Caldeira described Praça da Liberdade as a "territory of sociability", shaped by walking, lingering, encounters, leisure, and public life in Belo Horizonte. Daily uses include walking, informal meetings, photography, cultural visits, and exercise along the circulation route around the gardens.

Trees, lawns, paved areas, exposure to sunlight, and shadows cast by nearby buildings create different thermal conditions within the square. Shaded and landscaped areas make parts of the gardens more comfortable during the day, supporting continued use for walking, rest, and leisure.

The urban setting of Praça da Liberdade has changed considerably since Belo Horizonte's early decades. In the original plan, the square occupied a prominent position within the formal city enclosed by Avenida do Contorno. (Note: Avenida do Contorno marks the boundary of the urban area originally planned for Belo Horizonte. As the city grew, many neighborhoods developed beyond this initial outline.) Later, high-rise development in the central area and the growth of neighborhoods on higher ground, such as Serra and Mangabeiras on the slopes of the Serra do Curral, made this former topographic prominence less visible from many parts of the city. Even so, the protected ensemble preserves the relationship among the gardens, the former palace, the state department buildings, and the architectural additions of the 20th century.

After the state government moved to the Cidade Administrativa de Minas Gerais in 2010, the square developed a new public rhythm. Former government buildings around the gardens were adapted as museums, cultural centers, and memorial spaces, forming the Praça da Liberdade Cultural Circuit, later renamed Circuito Liberdade. Praça da Liberdade remained one of Belo Horizonte's main civic spaces, but its daily life became more closely associated with culture, tourism, education, leisure, and heritage preservation than with the routine work of state government.

== Circuito Liberdade ==
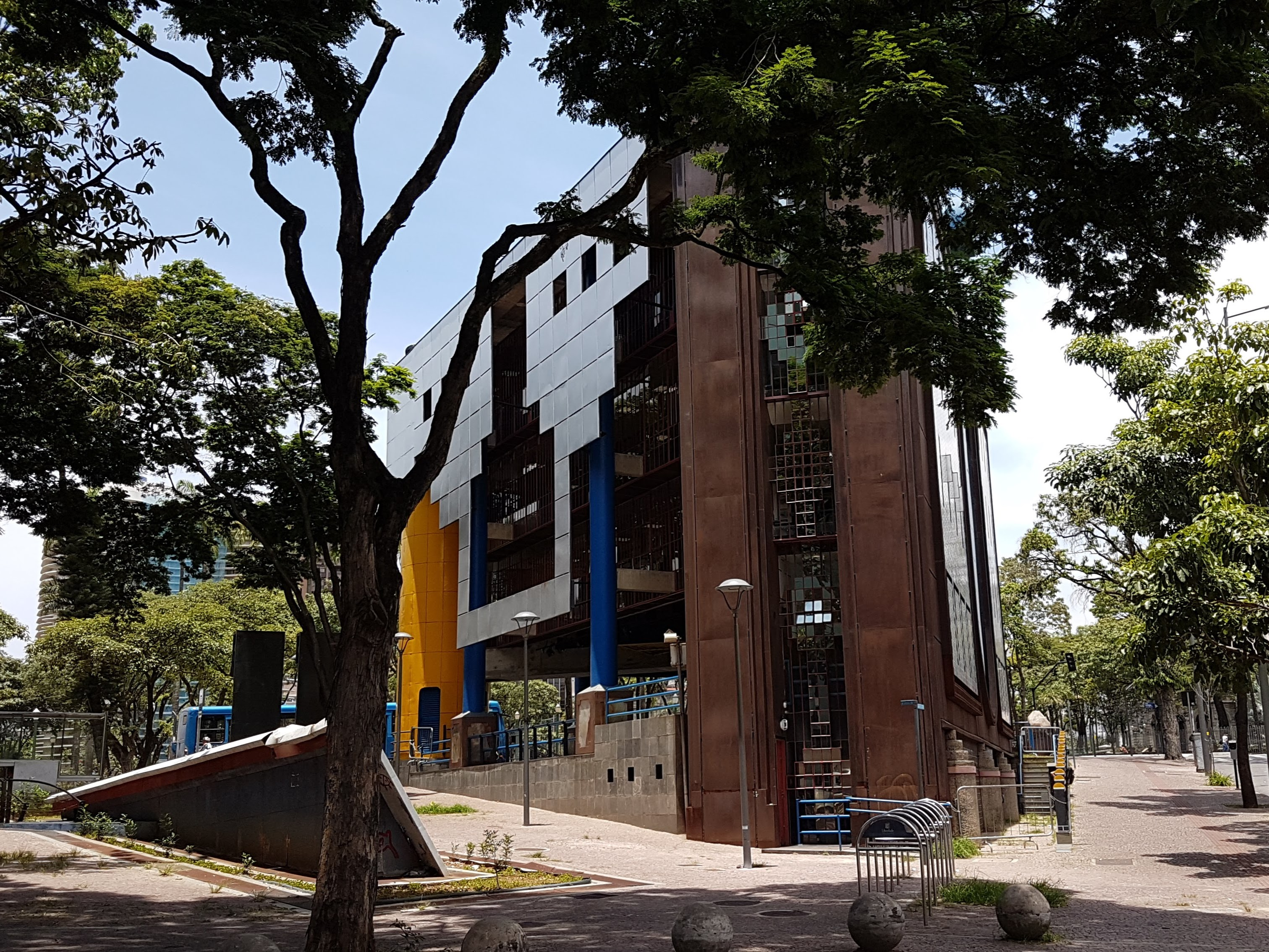
The Rainha da Sucata Building, a postmodern building later incorporated into Circuito Liberdade.

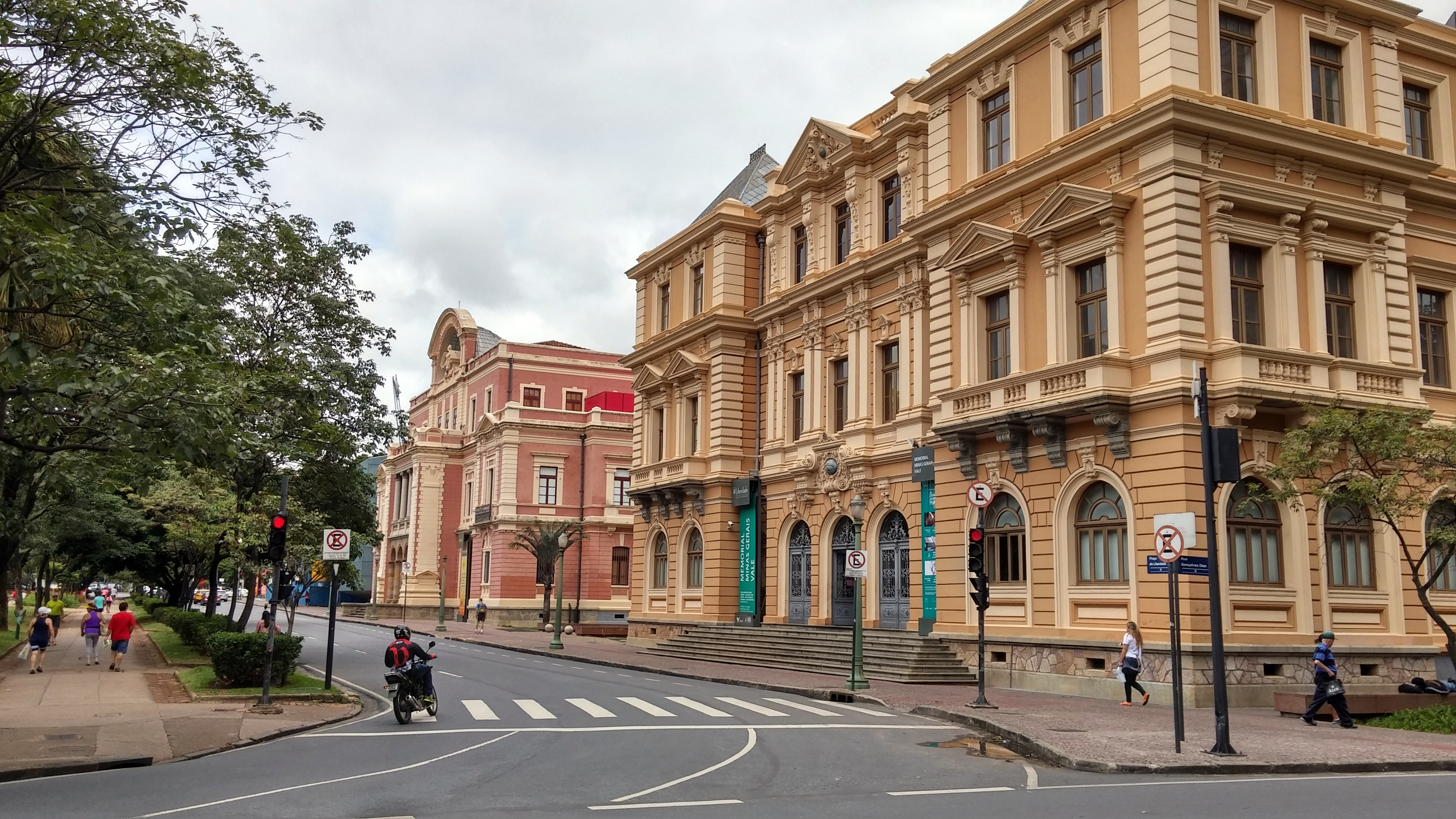
Memorial Minas Gerais Vale, housed in the former state finance department building.

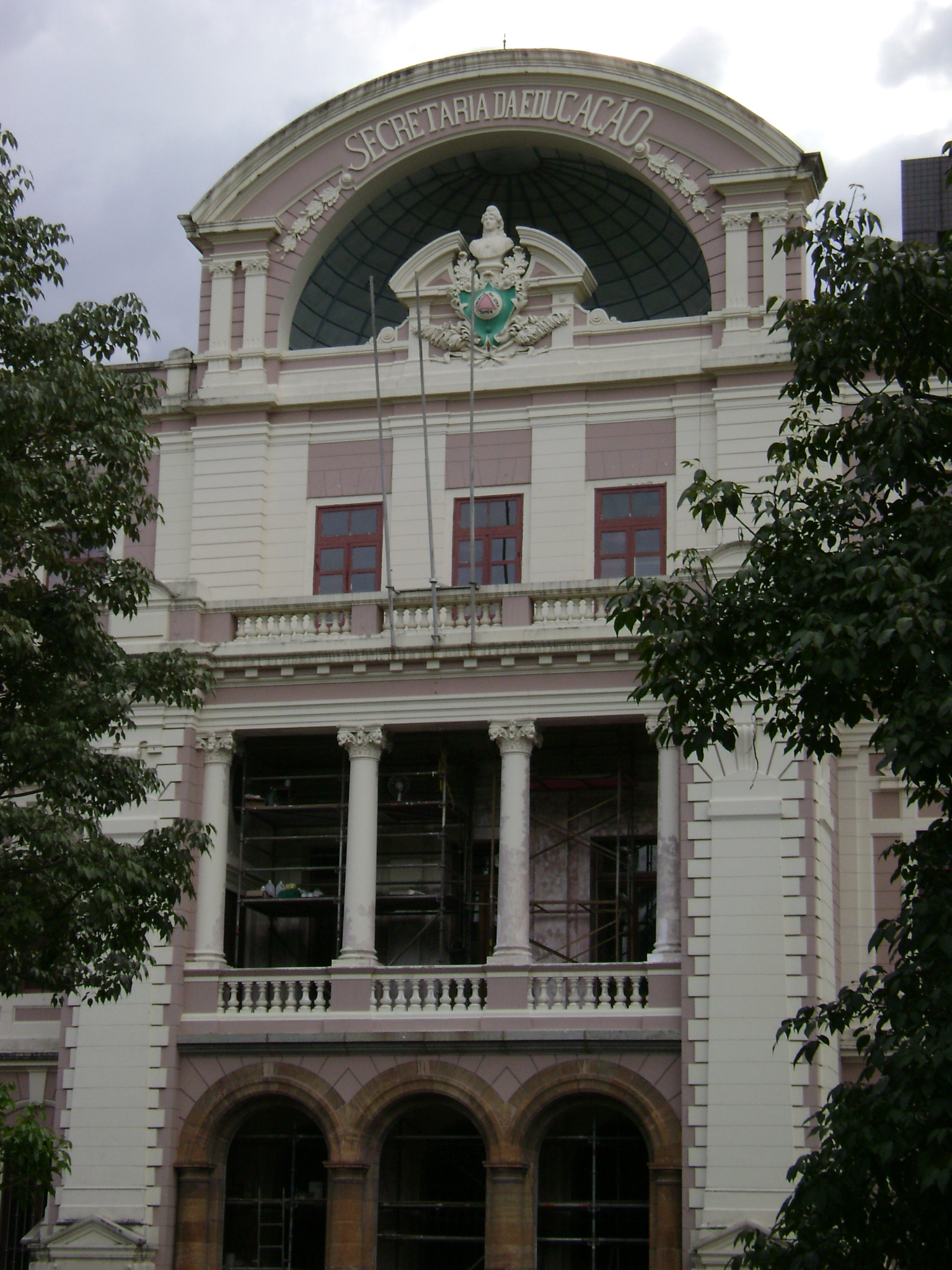
The former education department building, later adapted for MM Gerdau - Museum of Mines and Metal.

Praça da Liberdade was planned as the symbolic center of the Minas Gerais state government, with large public buildings arranged around it. For much of the 20th century, the area was closely tied to the daily work of the state administration. This pattern began to change after the government moved many agencies to the new Cidade Administrativa, leaving several historic buildings around the square available for new uses.

The Praça da Liberdade Cultural Circuit began in 2010 as a cultural route linking these former government buildings. (Note: In the name, circuito means a route or network of connected cultural venues rather than a single institution. The shorter name Circuito Liberdade later came into use for the broader cultural network.) Former departments and government offices were restored or adapted as museums, archives, cultural centers, and educational spaces. The project changed everyday life in the square and its surroundings, turning an area long associated with public administration into a cultural district visited by residents, students, researchers, and tourists.

Buildings formerly occupied by government agencies began to house museums, exhibitions, educational activities, and public programs, giving the area a new civic role centered on science, culture, and knowledge. The project later expanded through a network of state agencies, cultural institutions, and private sponsors.

The first phase focused on buildings already associated with Praça da Liberdade. Early institutions included the Minas Gerais Public Archive, the Luiz de Bessa State Public Library, the Museu Mineiro, the Palácio da Liberdade, the UFMG Knowledge Space, Memorial Minas Gerais Vale, and the Museum of Mines and Metal. The circuit soon expanded beyond the square itself, adding venues on nearby streets such as João Pinheiro Avenue and Rua da Bahia.

The UFMG Knowledge Space opened in 2010 through a partnership between the Minas Gerais government and the Federal University of Minas Gerais. It includes exhibitions, a planetarium, an astronomy terrace, guided visits, and educational activities. Memorial Minas Gerais Vale occupies the former state finance department building, an eclectic structure completed in 1897, and presents exhibitions and audiovisual installations on the history, culture, and traditions of Minas Gerais. The Museum of Mines and Metal, housed in the historic Prédio Rosa, focuses on geology, mining, and metallurgy, subjects closely connected with the history and economy of Minas Gerais. (Note: Prédio Rosa, meaning "Pink Building", is the common name of the former education department building on Praça da Liberdade.)

The Centro Cultural Banco do Brasil opened a Belo Horizonte branch in 2013 in the former public security department building. (Note: Sources associate the building with the Minas Gerais public security administration. At the time of its conversion into the CCBB Belo Horizonte, it was linked to the State Department of Social Defense, which then oversaw public safety functions.) The center includes exhibition galleries, a theater, audiovisual areas, multipurpose rooms, and public spaces for cultural programming. The Centro de Arte Popular, Casa Fiat de Cultura, BDMG Cultural, Academia Mineira de Letras, and other venues later joined the circuit or became part of its programming.

By 2020, the circuit had expanded further to include museums, archives, libraries, theaters, galleries, cinemas, concert halls, educational institutions, cultural centers, and creative-economy initiatives. It became one of the largest cultural complexes in Brazil.

The change gave Praça da Liberdade a new rhythm. Buildings once used by the public administration became places where visitors could encounter the history, memory, and cultural identity of Minas Gerais through exhibitions, archives, concerts, education, and heritage interpretation. Behind the public programming, the circuit depended on cooperation among state agencies, private partners, and nonprofit cultural organizations, a shared model that also brought management challenges. The square retained its civic setting, while the surrounding buildings became everyday destinations for culture, research, tourism, and leisure.

== Events and public life ==
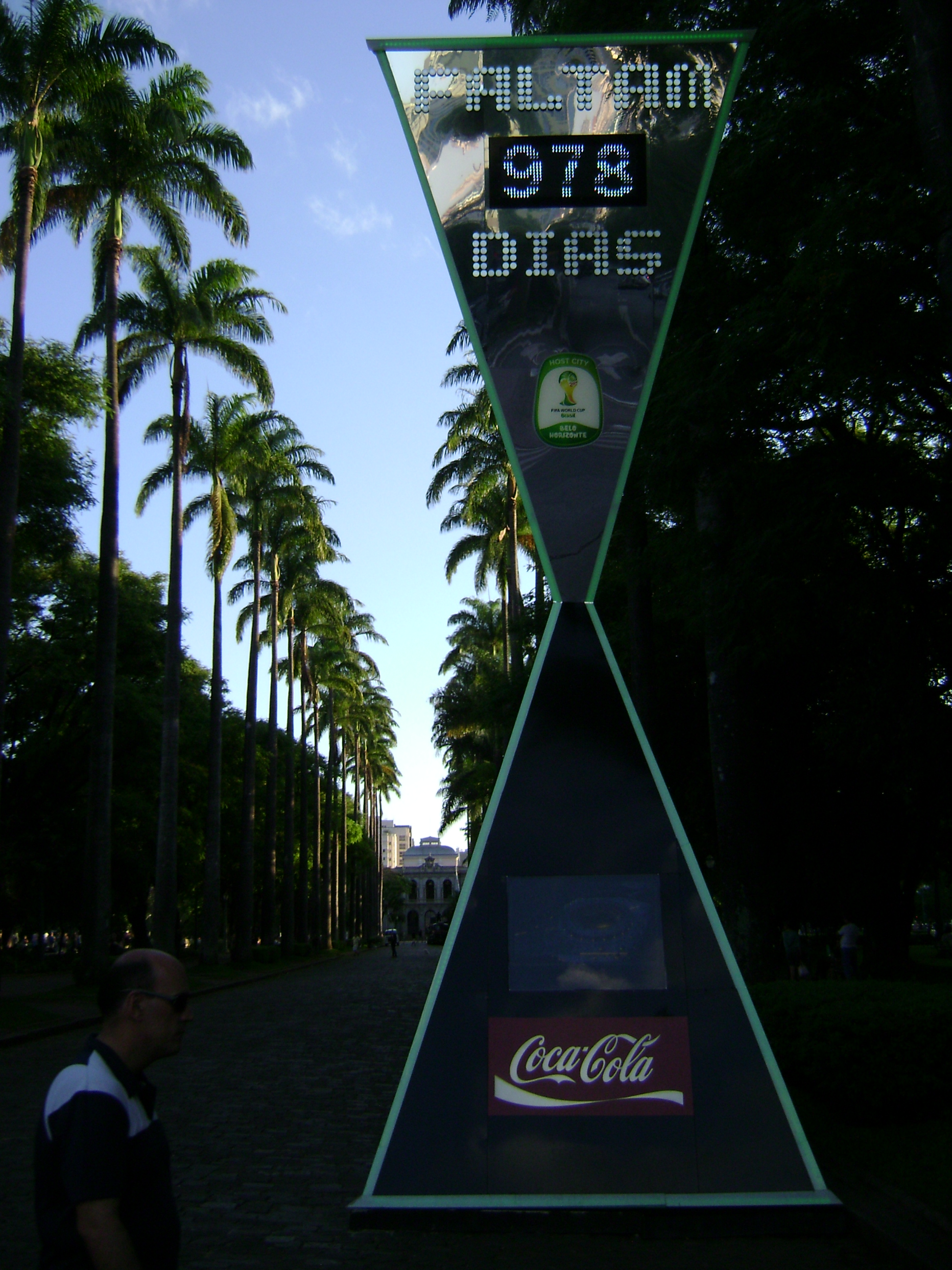
Countdown clock for the 2014 FIFA World Cup.

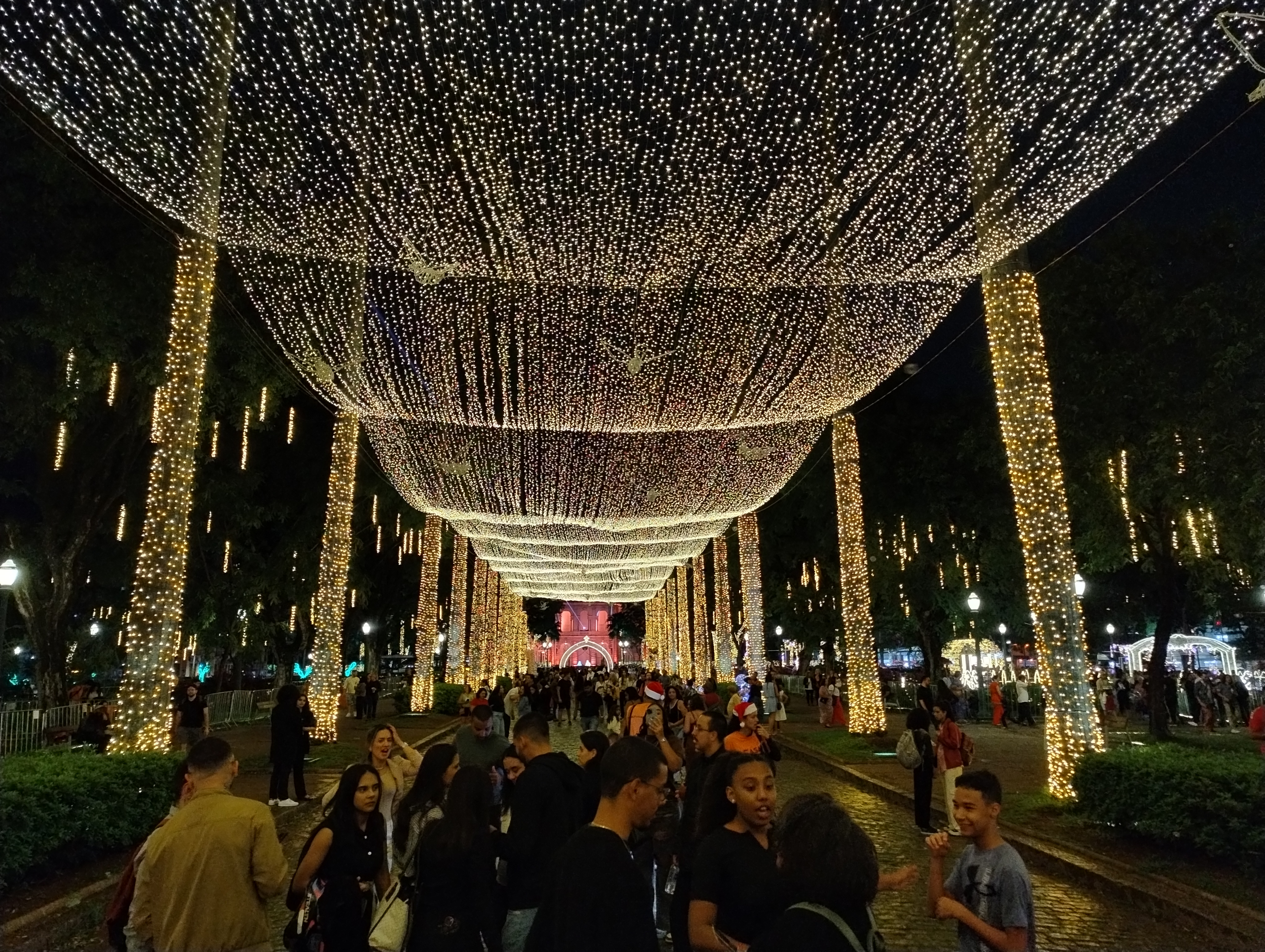
Christmas decorations in the square in 2025.

Praça da Liberdade is one of Belo Horizonte's principal settings for public celebrations, cultural programming, and civic gatherings. Its use as an event space grew after the creation of Circuito Liberdade, when the former government buildings around the square began operating as museums, libraries, archives, galleries, and cultural centers. Events now often extend across both the gardens and the surrounding institutions, giving the area a regular public life beyond everyday leisure and tourism.

Praça da Liberdade's Christmas lighting is among its best-known annual traditions. Presented under names such as Natal Liberdade Cemig and Natal da Mineiridade, the season has included illuminated gardens, projections on historic façades, music, cantatas, performances, workshops, and activities inside Circuito Liberdade's cultural venues. In 2021, the Luzes da Liberdade project filled the square with digital art, LED tunnels, illuminated figures, and projections on buildings within the protected architectural ensemble. Later editions connected the lighting in the square with a wider statewide Christmas program in Belo Horizonte and other cities in Minas Gerais.

The square has also become part of Belo Horizonte's New Year's Eve celebrations. Virada da Liberdade has brought concerts, DJs, artistic interventions, projection mapping, (Note: Projection mapping is a technique in which projected images are fitted to the shape of a building façade, monument, or other object. Instead of acting as a conventional flat screen, the structure itself becomes part of the visual presentation.) drone displays, audiovisual projections, dance, and food attractions to Praça da Liberdade and the surrounding cultural circuit. The 2024/2025 edition was planned for an audience of about 30,000 people in the square on December 31 and included a tribute to the cheese-making traditions of Minas Gerais.

Carnival programming has also made use of the square and nearby cultural buildings. Carnaval da Liberdade has included DJs, samba circles, performances, dance groups, concerts, processions led by military bands, and samba-school presentations, with activities distributed throughout Praça da Liberdade and Circuito Liberdade. Popular and religious traditions have also appeared in the circuit's seasonal programming, including Folia de Reis processions (Note: Folia de Reis is a popular tradition associated with the Christmas season. Groups of musicians and worshippers visit homes and public spaces, singing and commemorating the journey of the Three Magi to the infant Jesus.) held at the close of Christmas activities.

Institutions around the square take part in broader museum and heritage calendars. Circuito Liberdade venues have participated in National Museum Week, organized by the Brazilian Institute of Museums, with exhibitions, debates, workshops, educational activities, performances, and online programming. The circuit has also held a Heritage Week, with guided tours, mediated activities, discussions, workshops, seminars, artistic experiences, and programs devoted to the cultural heritage of Minas Gerais.

Heritage education programs have also treated the square itself as a subject of study. In June 2021, CCBB Educativo hosted guided visits and talks led by historian Liszt Vianna Neto on the memory, republican symbolism, heritage policies, and contemporary uses of the Praça da Liberdade ensemble.

Praça da Liberdade has also remained a setting for civic ceremonies, official celebrations, and political demonstrations. Its long association with state government made it a natural meeting place for public demands directed at political authorities. During the Revolution of 1930, demonstrators and civilians occupied the Palácio da Liberdade, and the square itself filled with protesters during the conflicts of that year. Political and civic use continued after the state government moved to the Cidade Administrativa, while the square's everyday identity became more closely tied to culture, leisure, and heritage.

== Gallery ==
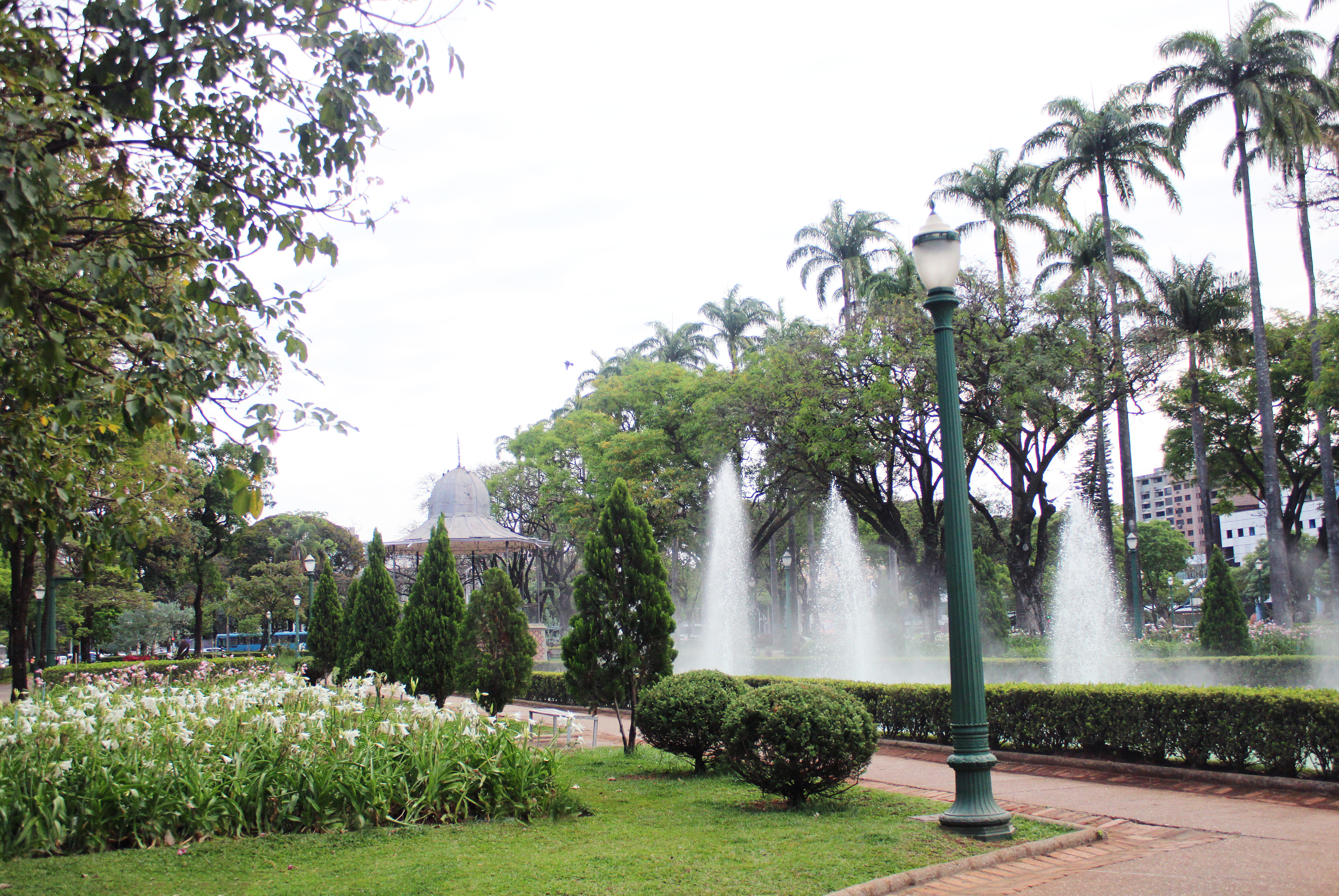
Fountains and gardens of the architectural and landscape ensemble.

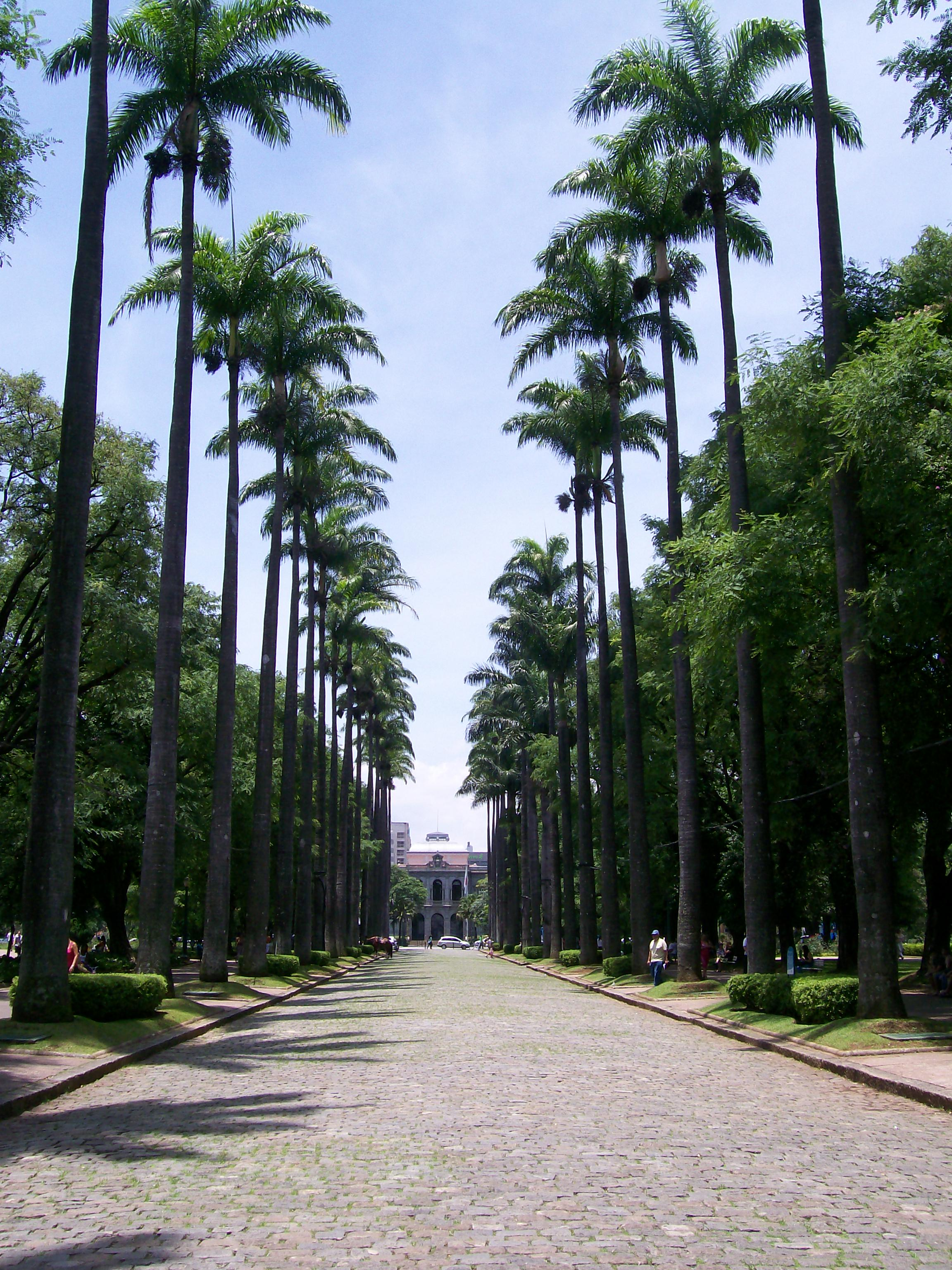
Royal palms.

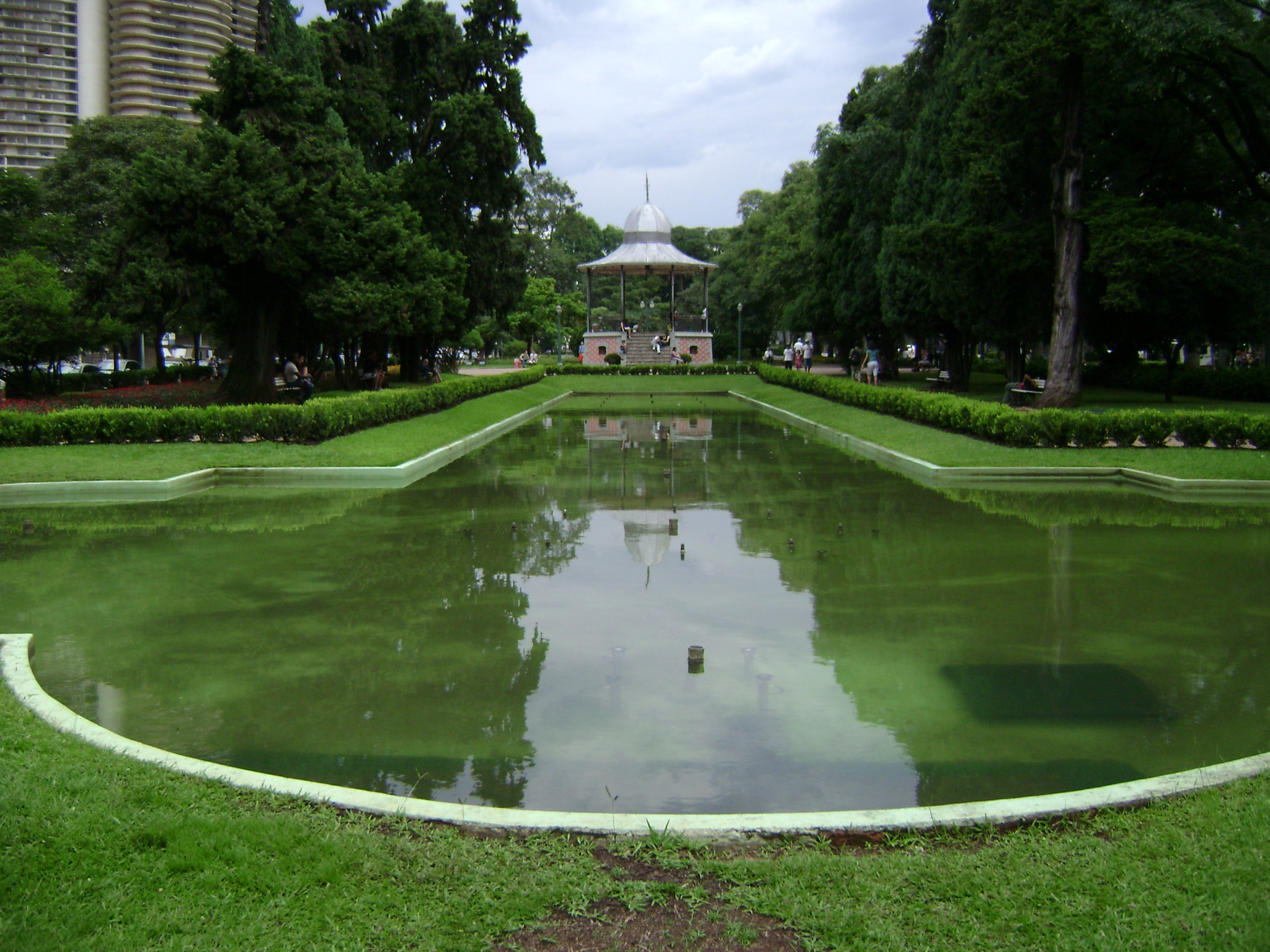
Fountain and gardens in the square.

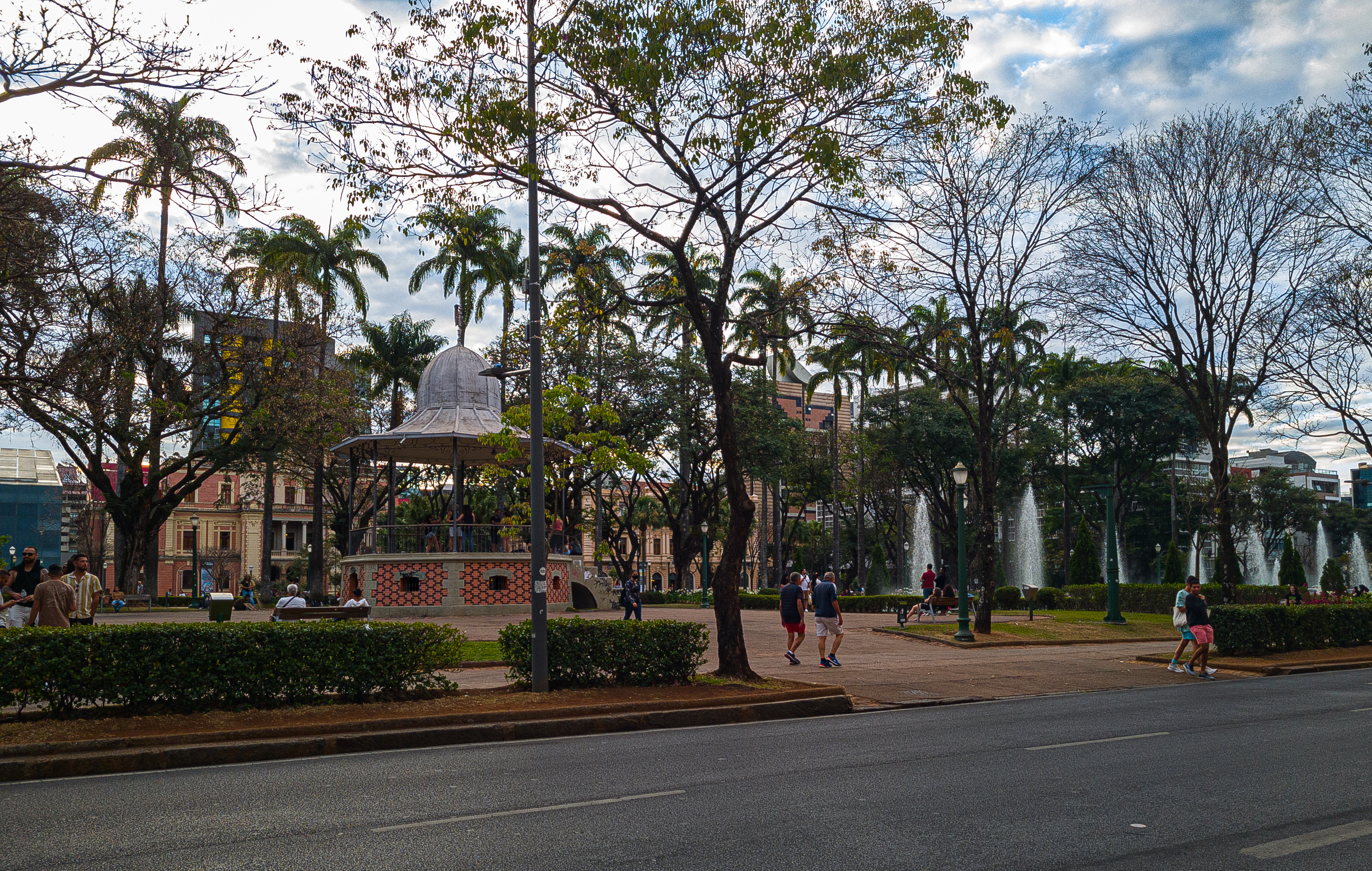
View of the square and its bandstand.

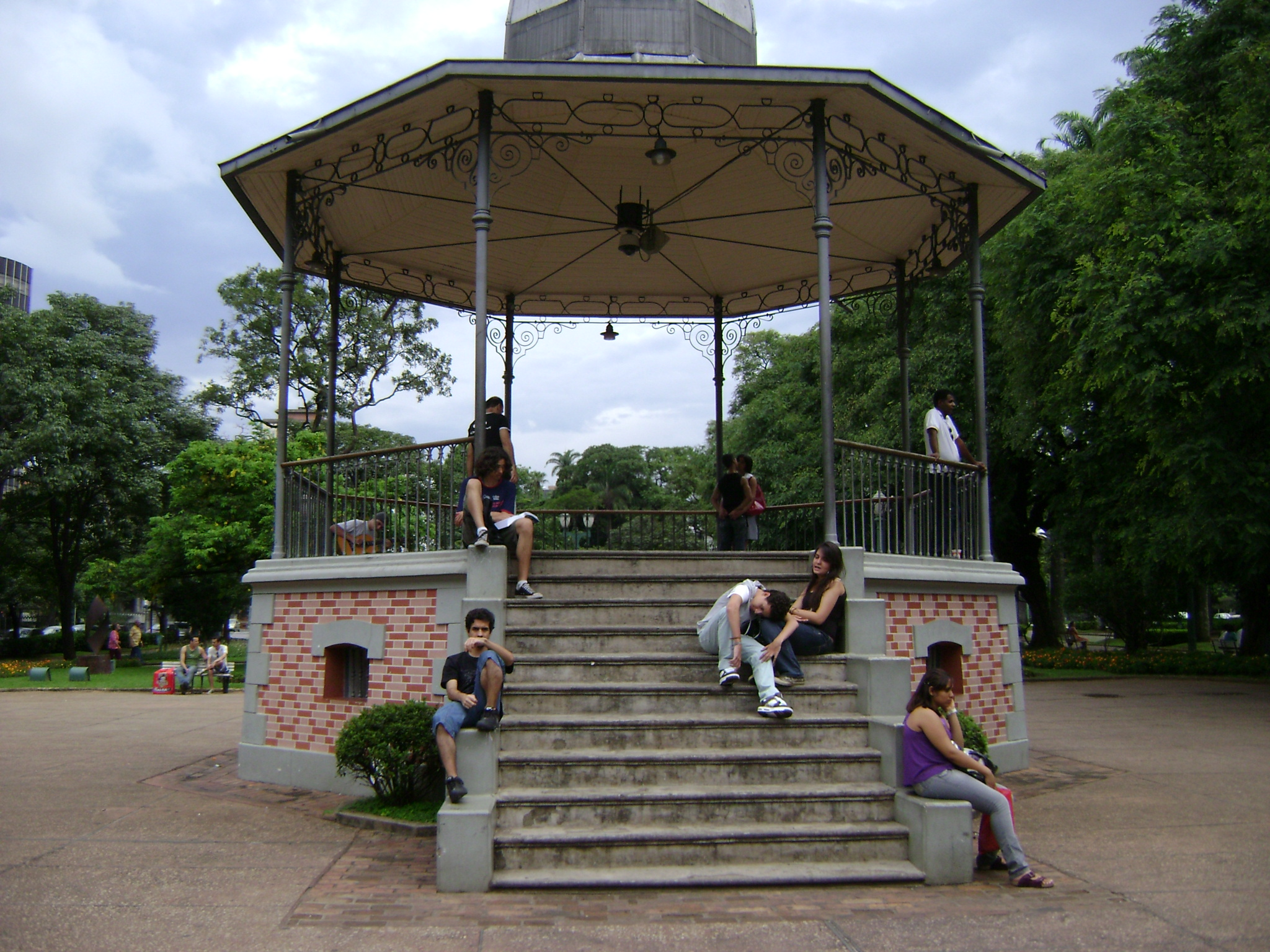
Bandstand in Praça da Liberdade.

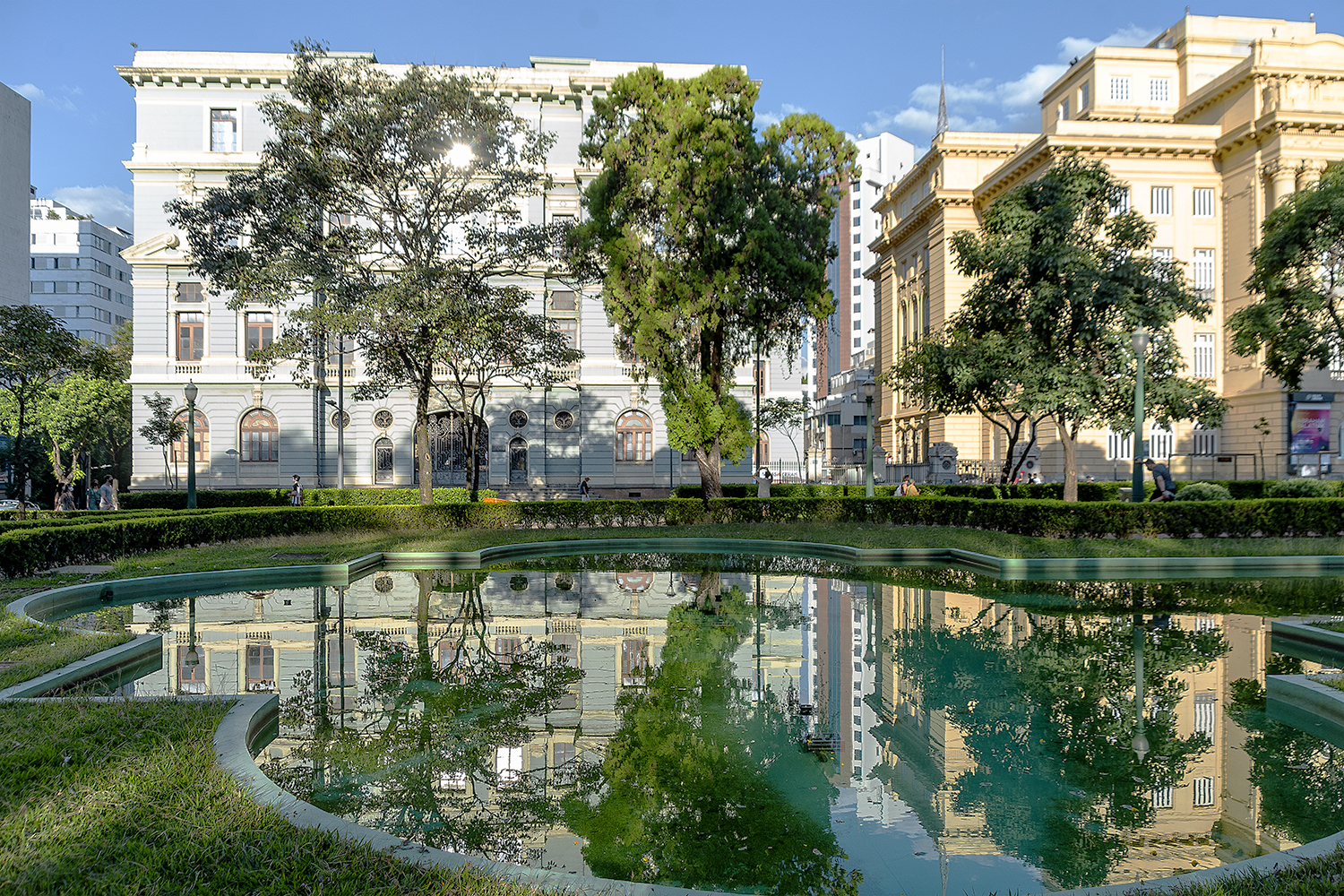
Former Dept. of Transportation and Public Works.

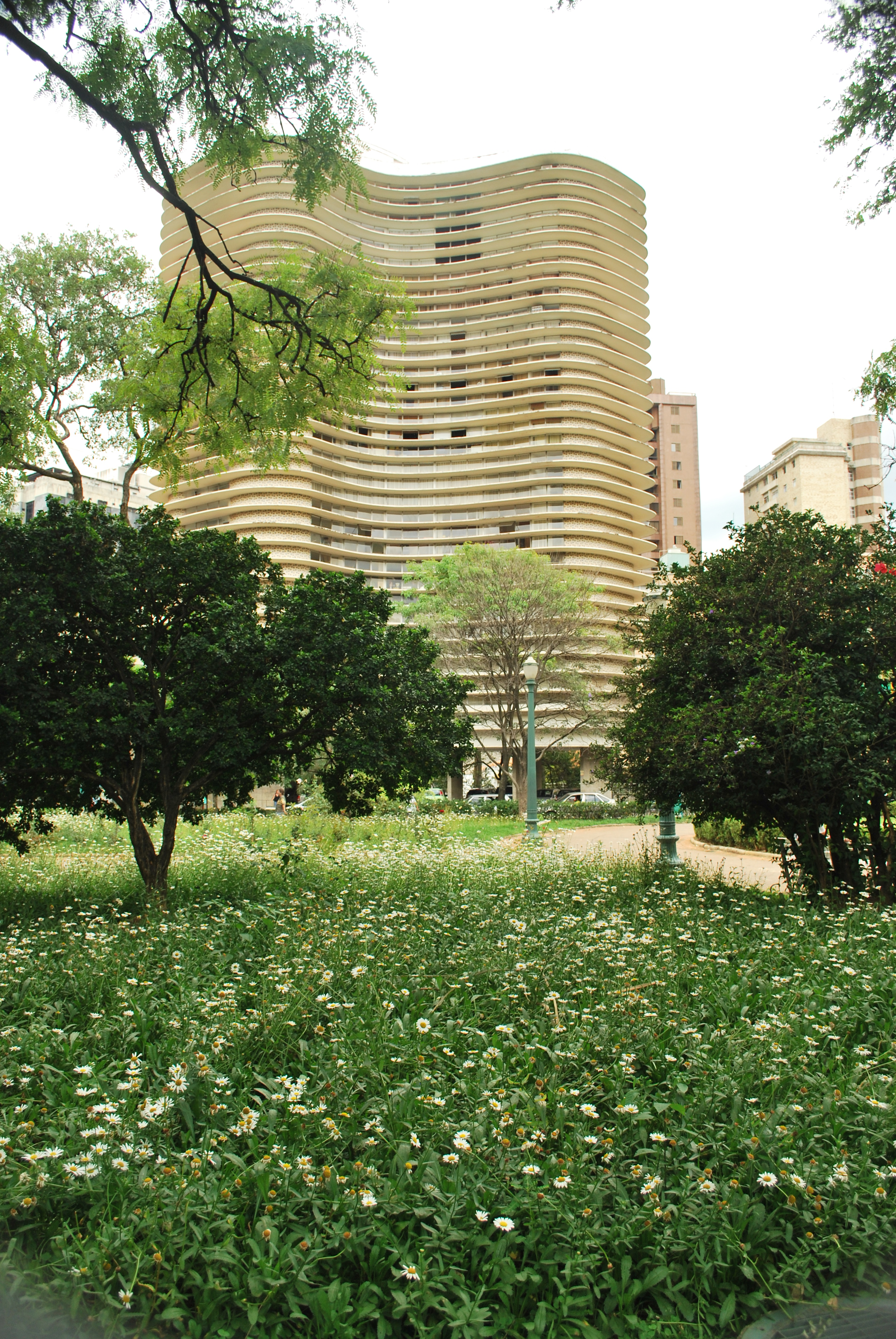
The Niemeyer Building.

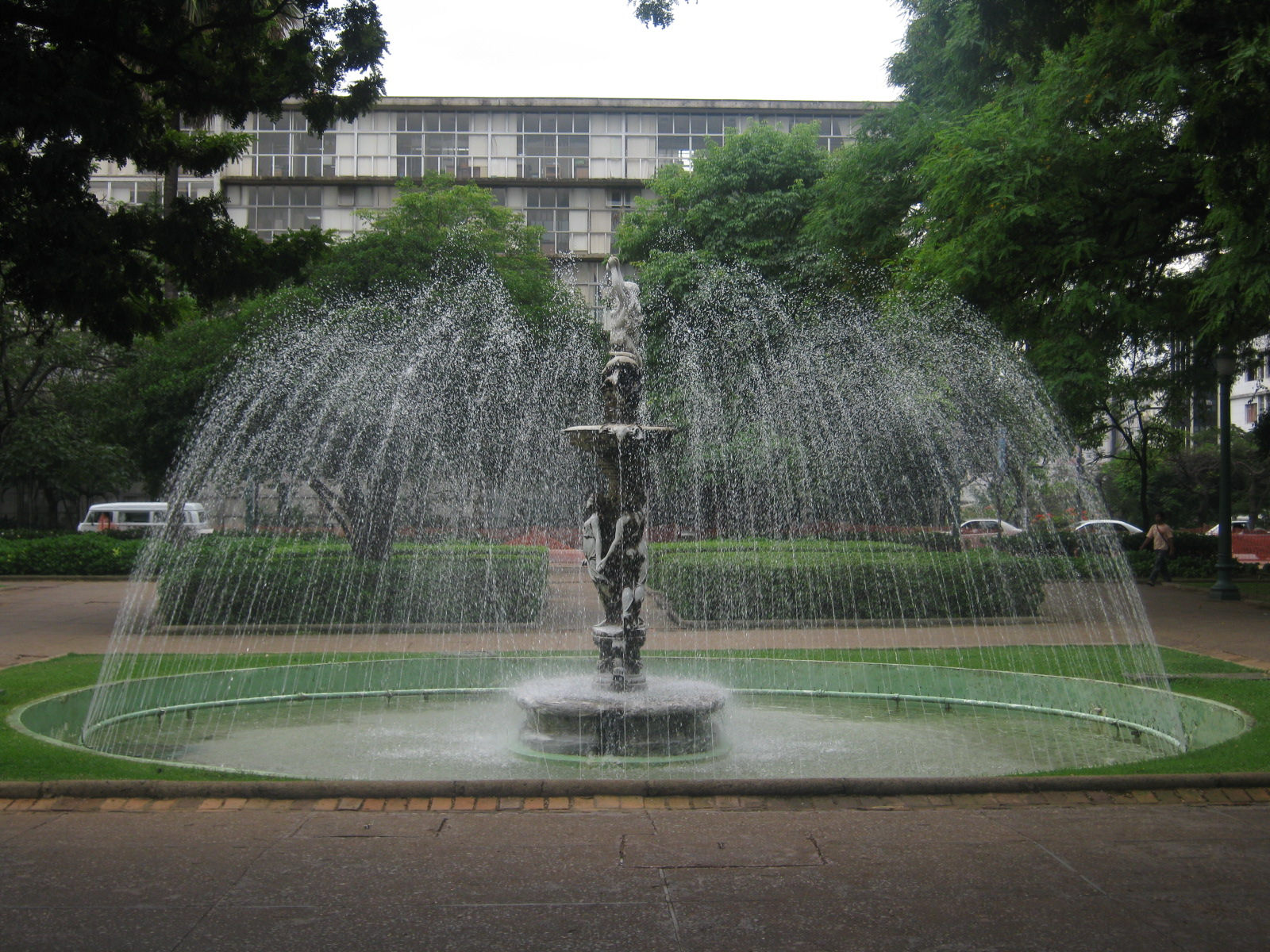
Fountain in Praça da Liberdade.

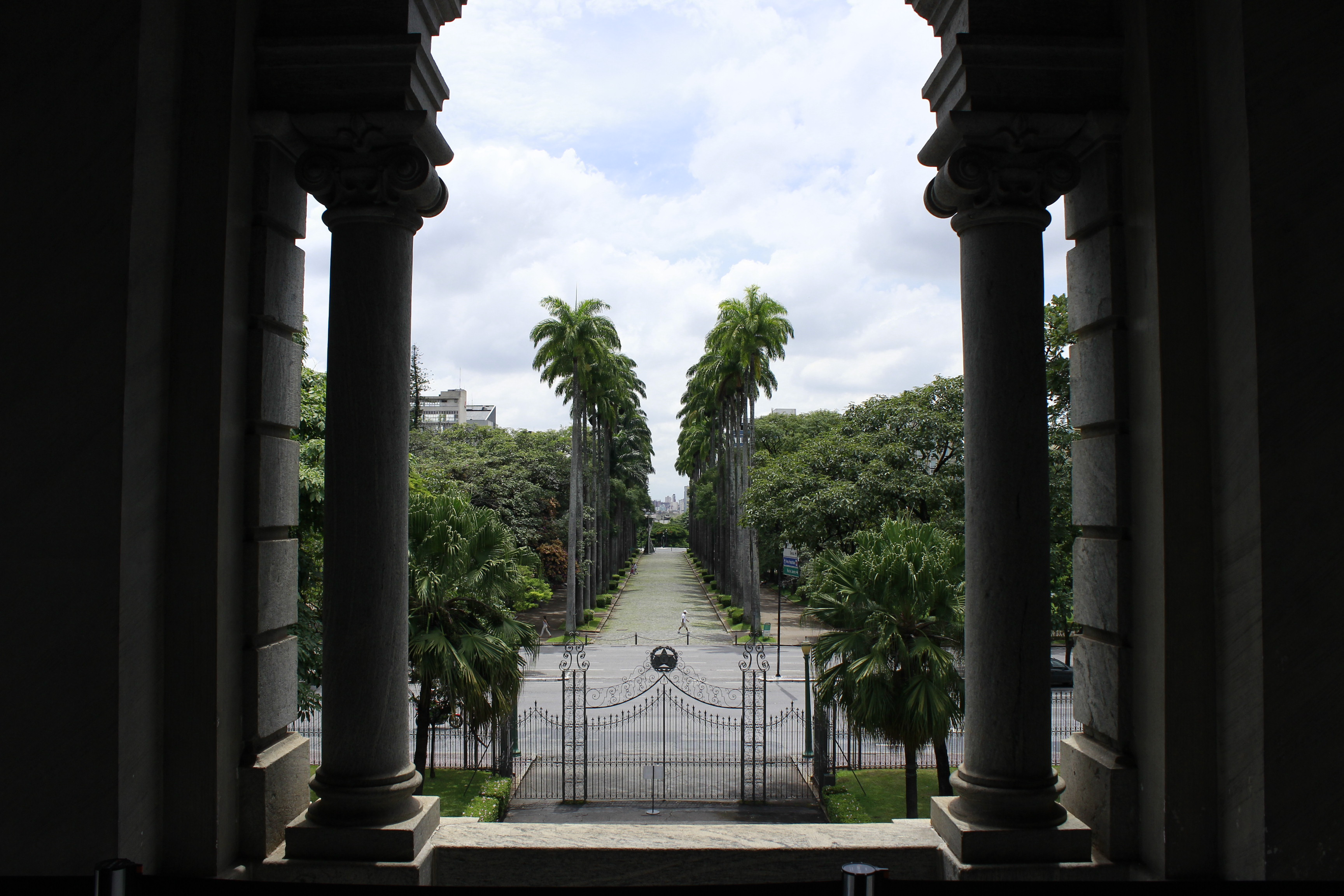
View toward the Palácio da Liberdade.

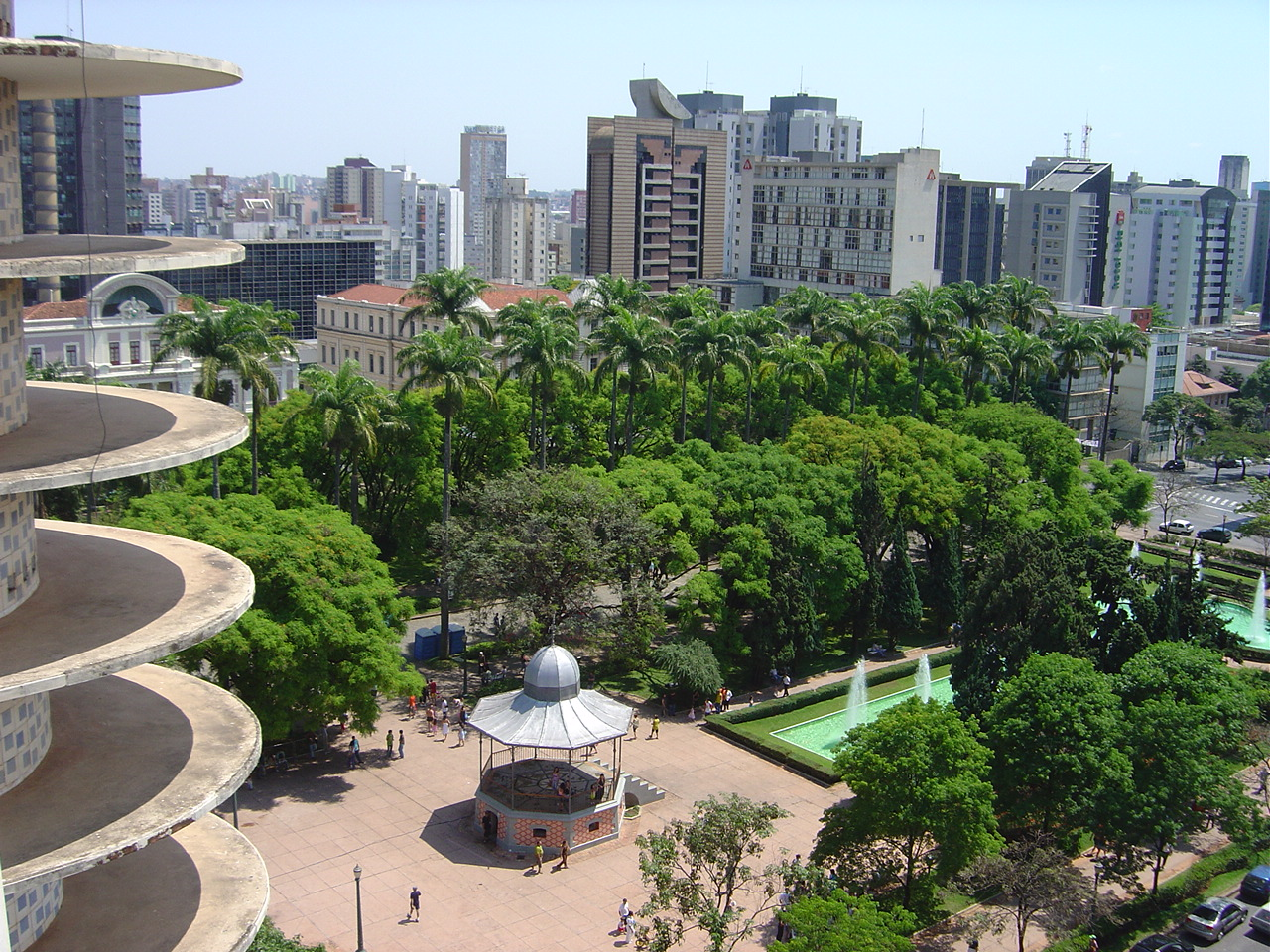
Praça da Liberdade seen from the Niemeyer Building.

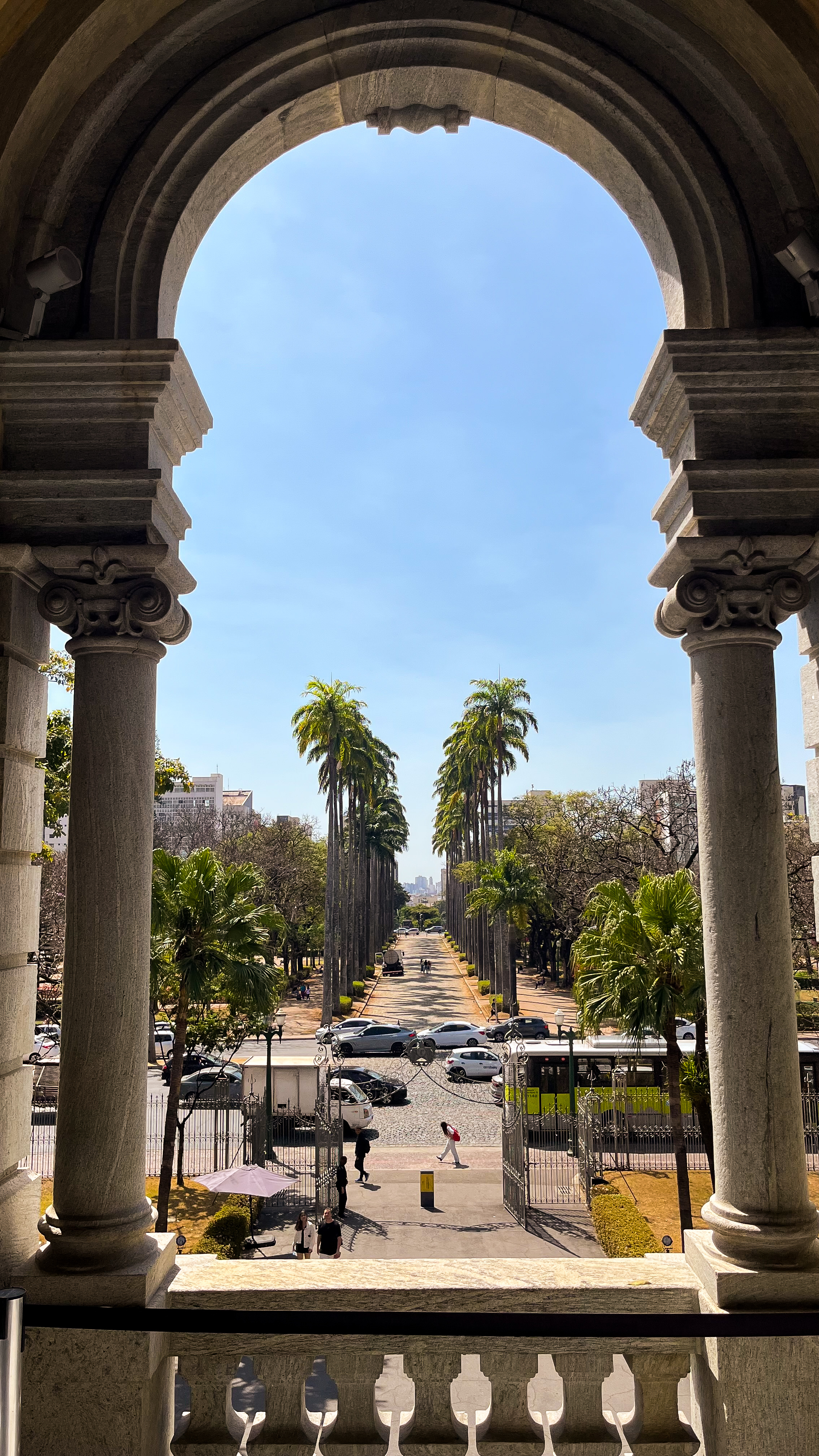
Gardens

== See also ==
- Palácio da Liberdade – historic seat of the Minas Gerais state government and the architectural focal point of the square
- Palácio das Mangabeiras – former official residence of the governors of Minas Gerais
- Niemeyer Building – modernist landmark facing Praça da Liberdade
