= Niemeyer Building =

Residential building designed by Oscar Niemeyer in Belo Horizonte, Brazil

- Edifício Niemeyer
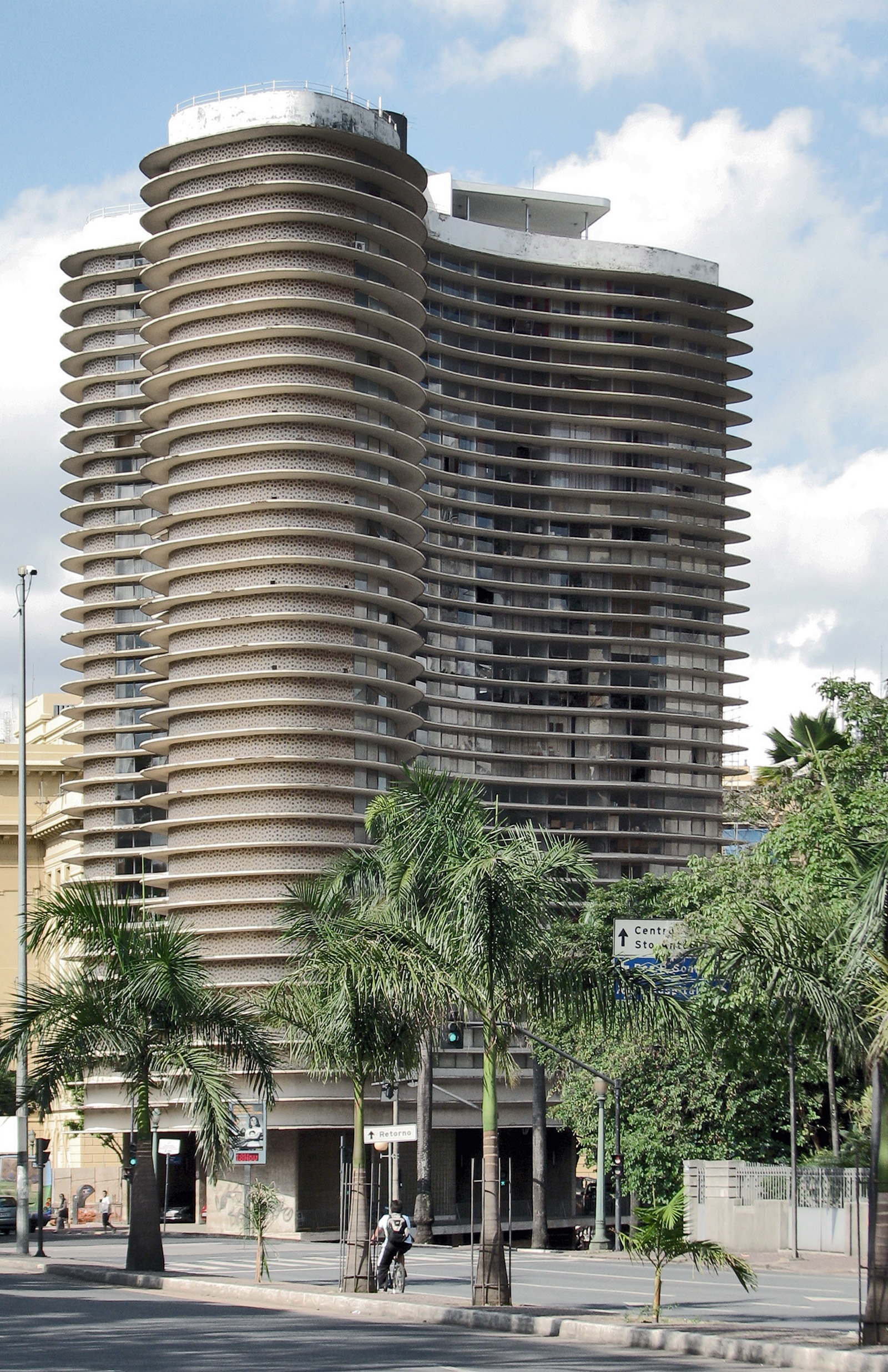
- The Niemeyer Building seen from the Palácio da Liberdade
- Interactive map of the Niemeyer Building area

General information
- Status: Completed
- Type: Residential
- Architectural style: Modernist
- Location: Belo Horizonte, Brazil, Corner of Praça da Liberdade and Avenida Brasil, Belo Horizonte, Brazil
- Coordinates: 19°55′57.6″S 43°56′14.62″W
- Named for: Oscar Niemeyer
- Construction started: 1954
- Completed: 1960
- Renovated: 2017–2018
- Client: Lúcia Machado Almeida

Technical details
- Material: Concrete
- Floor count: 12

Design and construction
- Architect: Oscar Niemeyer
- Designations: Listed on municipal, state, and national heritage registers

Other information
- Number of rooms: 22 apartments

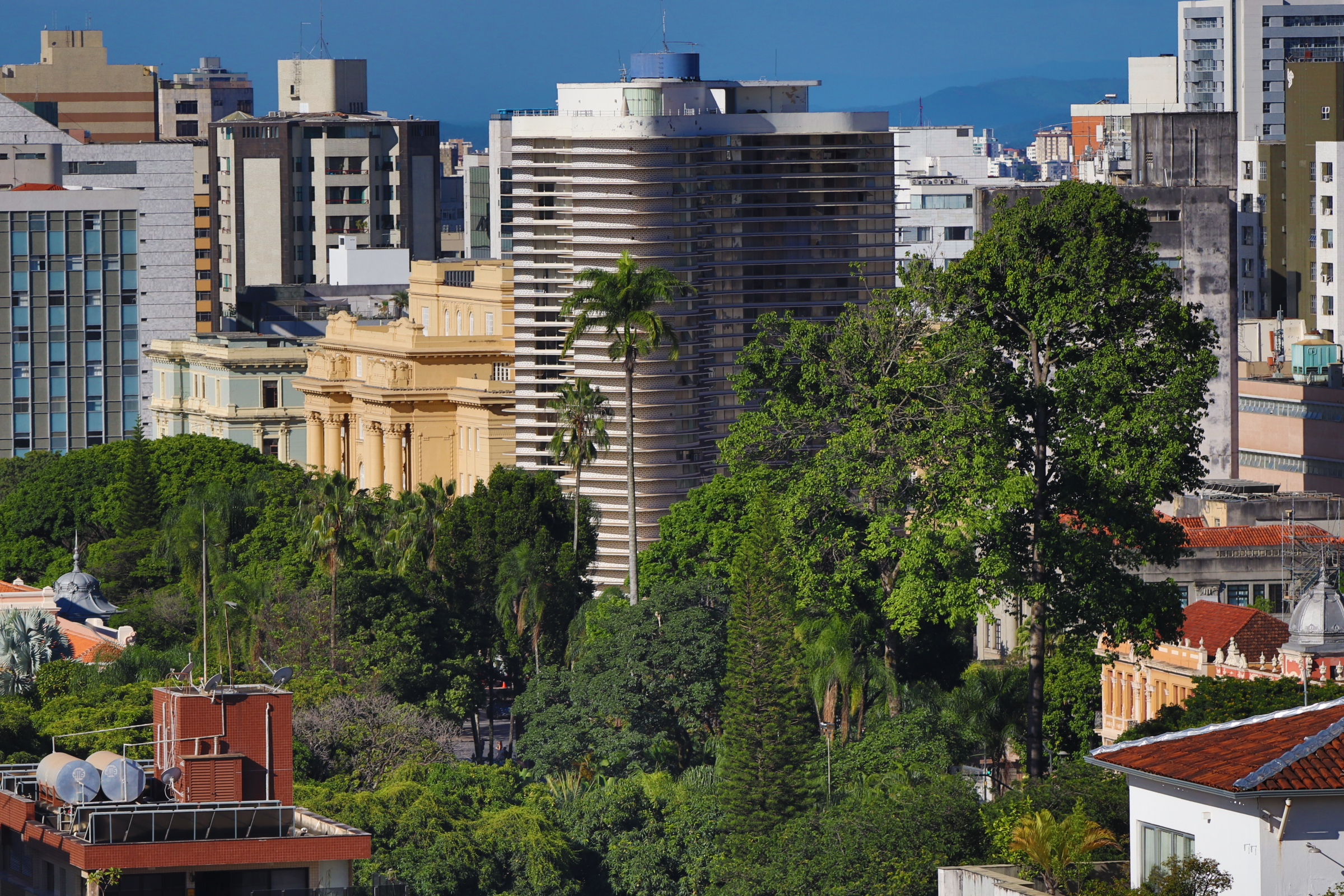
Niemeyer Building, Belo Horizonte, Brazil. January 2025

The Niemeyer Building (Portuguese: Edifício Niemeyer) is a residential building located in Belo Horizonte, Brazil, designed by the architect Oscar Niemeyer and constructed between 1954 and 1960. It is an iconic piece of Brazilian modernistic architecture.

== Description ==
The Niemeyer Building was designed in the early 1950s and constructed between 1954 and 1960. It is situated on a triangular lot at the corner of Praça da Liberdade and Avenida Brasil, occupying the site where the Dolabela Palace previously stood.

With its distinctive curved shape and horizontal concrete brise-soleil, the building is considered an icon of modernist architecture in Brazil. Niemeyer was inspired by the curves of the mountains around Belo Horizonte when designing the building. The 12-story structure contains 22 apartments of various sizes and layouts.

The Niemeyer Building is part of the architectural and landscaping ensemble of Praça da Liberdade, which was protected by the State Institute of Historic and Artistic Heritage of Minas Gerais (IEPHA-MG) in 1977. The building itself is listed at the municipal, state, and federal levels.

== History ==
In the 1950s, Lúcia Machado Almeida, the sister of local politician Cristiano Machado, commissioned Niemeyer to design a luxury residential building on her family's lot on Praça da Liberdade. Niemeyer's modernist design was controversial at the time, with some opposing the construction of private residence in the public square. After a halted start, the building was completed in 1960 and became home to many of Belo Horizonte's elite families.

The Niemeyer Building's open ground floor was originally designed to frame views of the Serra do Curral mountain range behind the square. However, surrounding development in subsequent decades obstructed this view.

By the 2010s, the building was in need of restoration. In 2012, a renovation project was approved by municipal and state heritage councils and the federal Ministry of Culture. However, lack of sponsorship meant the residents funded more limited renovations themselves from 2017 to 2018.

== Significance ==
The Niemeyer Building was one of the first examples of modernist architecture in Belo Horizonte, completed before the famous works of Brasília.

Architecturally, the curved volumes and horizontal bands created an innovative and provocative form for the time. The distinctive silhouette became an icon representing Praça da Liberdade and Belo Horizonte as a whole.

Historically, the building marked the introduction of modern architecture to the 19th century European-inspired plan of Belo Horizonte. It embodied Niemeyer's vision of integrating modernism with the local landscape.
