= Palácio da Liberdade =

Historic government palace in Belo Horizonte, Brazil

- Palácio da Liberdade
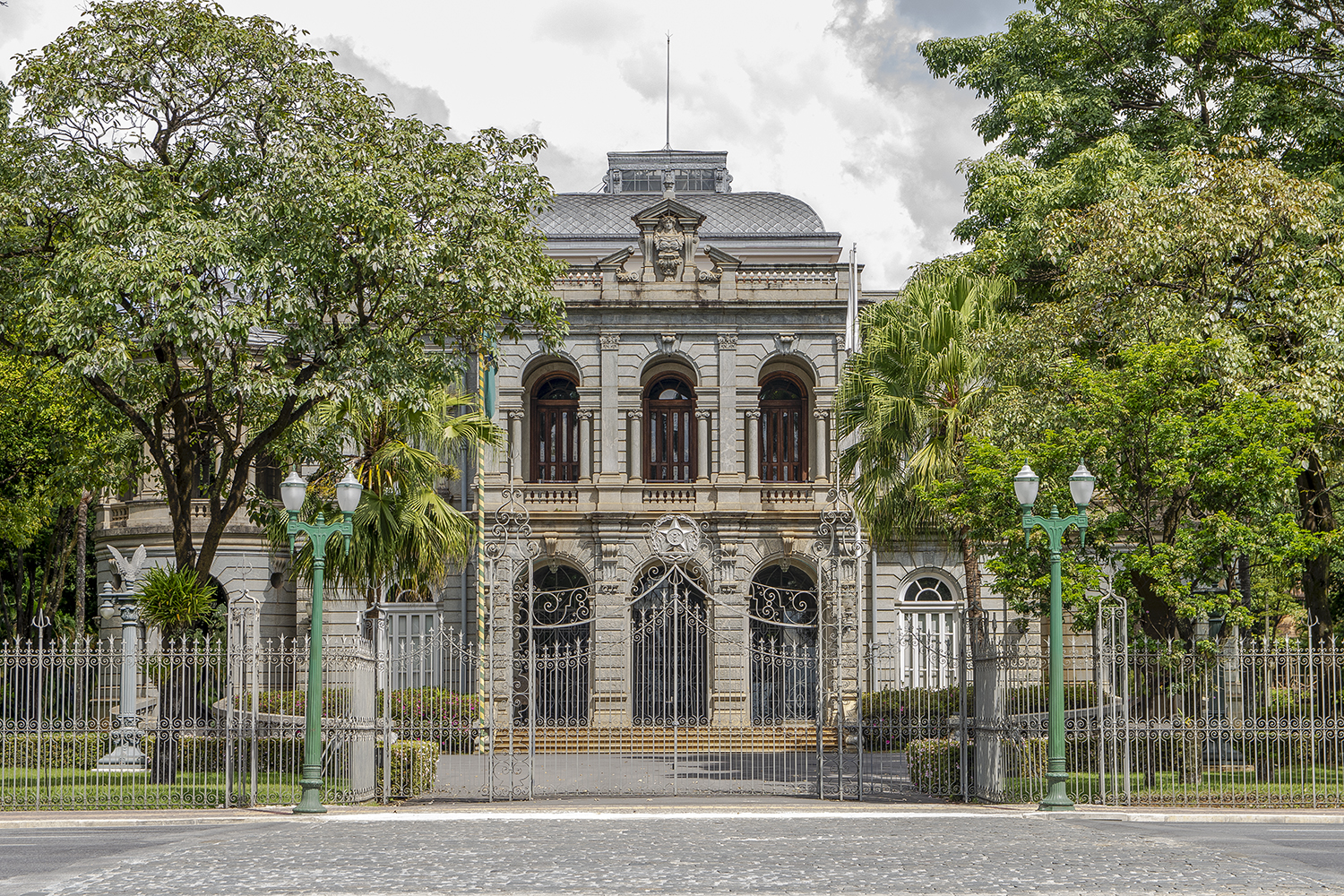
- Front view from the central avenue of Praça da Liberdade
- Interactive map of the Palácio da Liberdade area
- Former names: Presidential Palace

General information
- Status: Completed
- Type: Former state government palace and official residence; cultural venue
- Architectural style: Eclectic; French Romantic classicism; Baroque Revival; Italian Renaissance Revival; Art Nouveau; Moorish Revival
- Location: Praça da Liberdade, Savassi, Belo Horizonte, Minas Gerais 30140-010, Belo Horizonte, Minas Gerais, Brazil
- Coordinates: 19°56′0.6″S 43°56′18.5″W
- Construction started: November 25, 1895
- Completed: 1898
- Inaugurated: 1898
- Renovated: 2004–2006; 2023–2025 restoration program
- Client: New Capital Construction Commission (Note: The New Capital Construction Commission was the public agency established to plan and build Belo Horizonte as the new capital of Minas Gerais.)
- Owner: Government of Minas Gerais

Technical details
- Floor count: 3

Design and construction
- Architect: José de Magalhães
- Designations: State heritage listing by IEPHA-MG (1975); part of the Praça da Liberdade and Adjacent Areas Urban Ensemble (1994)

Website
- palaciodaliberdade.com.br

The Palácio da Liberdade (Portuguese for "Palace of Liberty") is a historic government palace and cultural venue in Belo Horizonte, Minas Gerais, Brazil.

The building stands at the upper end of Praça da Liberdade, (Note: Praça da Liberdade is the civic square planned for the new capital of Minas Gerais.) in the civic center designed after the state capital was moved from Ouro Preto to Belo Horizonte. Originally known as the Presidential Palace, (Note: During the early Brazilian Republic, the heads of Brazil's states were often called presidents of state rather than governors.) it was built to serve as the seat of the Minas Gerais government and the official residence of the state's governors.

Designed by José de Magalhães, the palace was one of the public buildings erected for the new capital. Its façade reflects French Romantic classicism, while its interiors combine Baroque Revival, Italian Renaissance Revival, Art Nouveau, Louis XV style, and Moorish Revival elements. The building contains an iron-and-marble staircase, decorative paintings by Frederick Steckel and Antônio Parreiras, parquet floors, imported materials, and gardens designed by Paul Villon.

The cornerstone was laid on September 7, 1895, construction began on November 25 of that year, and the palace was inaugurated in 1898, one year after Belo Horizonte. For much of the 20th century, governors lived and worked in the building, which also received official visitors. Two governors associated with the palace later reached Brazil's presidency or presidency-elect: Juscelino Kubitschek served as president, while Tancredo Neves was elected president but died before taking office.

The Palácio da Liberdade was granted state heritage protection by the Instituto Estadual do Patrimônio Histórico e Artístico de Minas Gerais (IEPHA-MG) in 1975. (Note: Under Brazilian cultural heritage law, tombamento is a formal listing that restricts the demolition or substantial alteration of a cultural property without approval from the responsible heritage authority.) The protected ensemble includes the façades, interiors, decorative elements, gardens, fountain, sculptures, orchid house, and kiosk. The palace also forms part of the protected urban landscape of Praça da Liberdade and its surroundings. After many state government functions were transferred to the Cidade Administrativa, (Note: This is a shortened form of Cidade Administrativa Presidente Tancredo Neves, a state government complex built in Belo Horizonte to bring together agencies of the Minas Gerais executive branch.) the building became part of Circuito Liberdade, a network of museums and cultural venues around the square. It now receives visitors and school groups and hosts exhibitions, heritage education programs, and cultural events, while restoration continues on the building and its collection.

== History ==
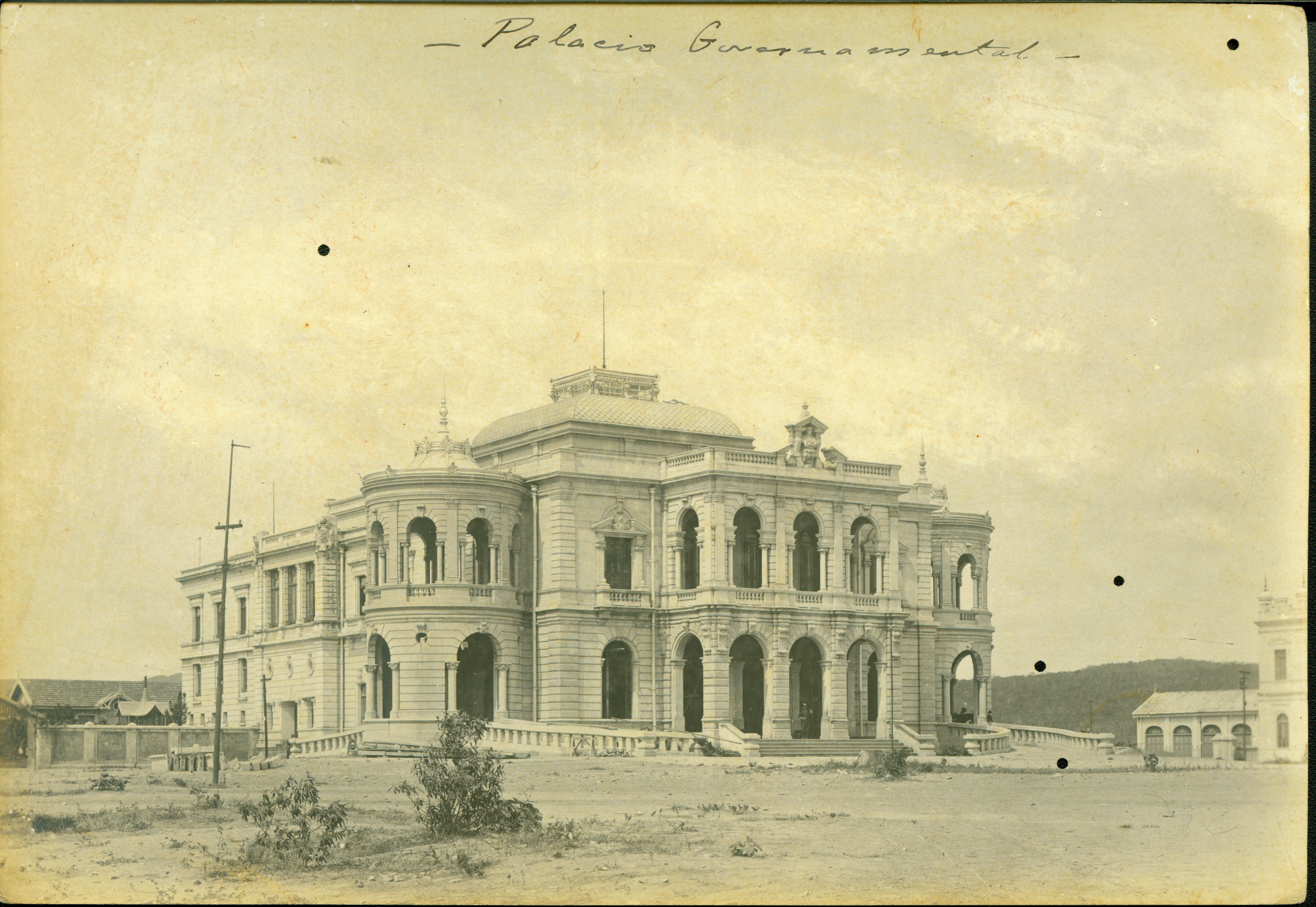
The palace in the late 19th century

=== Construction and inauguration ===
The Palácio da Liberdade was planned for the new capital of Minas Gerais, which was built to replace Ouro Preto as the seat of the state government. Praça da Liberdade occupied elevated ground in an area known as Alto da Boa Vista, (Note: Alto da Boa Vista was the elevated area selected for the civic center of the new capital.) where the palace and the first state department buildings faced the planned city. The square stood at the end of the axis that later became João Pinheiro Avenue, with Brazil and Bias Fortes avenues also converging there. Rows of royal palms directed the view from the square toward the palace.

The building was first known as the Presidential Palace and was constructed as both the official residence and the workplace of the state government. José de Magalhães prepared the design. The cornerstone was laid on September 7, 1895, construction began on November 25, and the palace was inaugurated in 1898, one year after Belo Horizonte.

=== Seat of the state government ===
The palace stood at the top of the new administrative district. Around Praça da Liberdade, the state built the first department buildings for the government transferred from Ouro Preto. During the capital's early years, some departments also operated inside the palace. Senior civil servants settled on streets near the square, giving rise to the name of the Funcionários neighborhood. (Note: Funcionários, meaning "civil servants", became the name of the neighborhood associated with state government employees who settled near Praça da Liberdade.)

The palace, square, and department buildings formed the political center of the new capital. The ensemble placed the republican government at one of the city's most visible points, above the older religious landmarks of the former settlement.

=== Official residence of the governors ===
The three-story building also served as a residence for the governors of Minas Gerais and their families. Crispim Jacques Bias Fortes was the first governor to live there. Later residents and users included Benedito Valadares, Milton Campos, Juscelino Kubitschek, and Tancredo Neves.

In 1920, the palace and Praça da Liberdade were redecorated for a visit to Belo Horizonte by King Albert I of Belgium and Queen Elisabeth. The work altered parts of the palace's decoration and gave the square a more formal French-garden design. The royal couple stayed at the Palácio da Liberdade during the visit.

Kubitschek was the last governor to live in the palace before the Palácio das Mangabeiras was built as a new official residence in Belo Horizonte's Mangabeiras neighborhood during the 1950s.

=== Later administrative use ===
By the 1960s, the Palácio da Liberdade could no longer accommodate all the work of the state government. The neighboring Palácio dos Despachos (Note: In Brazilian public administration, despachos are official decisions, orders, or referrals handled by executive offices and government agencies.) opened in 1967 as an administrative support building for the governor's office and the state civil service.

In 1969, during the administration of Israel Pinheiro, Oscar Niemeyer prepared a proposal to replace the historic palace with the Palácio do Desenvolvimento, (Note: Palácio do Desenvolvimento, or Palace of Development, was the name of Oscar Niemeyer's unbuilt proposal for a modern government tower on the site of the Palácio da Liberdade.) a smoked-glass tower. The project was not carried out.

Beginning in the 1970s, governors worked more frequently from the Palácio dos Despachos. Tancredo Neves later resumed regular use of the Palácio da Liberdade, and Eduardo Azeredo, Itamar Franco, and Aécio Neves also used it as a working palace. It opened to public visitation on December 12, 1978, during the administration of Levindo Ozanam Coelho.

The state government later transferred many administrative functions away from Praça da Liberdade. Beginning in 2010, the governor's office operated from Palácio Tiradentes in the Cidade Administrativa Presidente Tancredo Neves, a state administrative complex designed by Oscar Niemeyer. After the departments and other government agencies left the Praça da Liberdade area, several historic buildings around the square were adapted for cultural use.

=== Restoration and cultural use ===
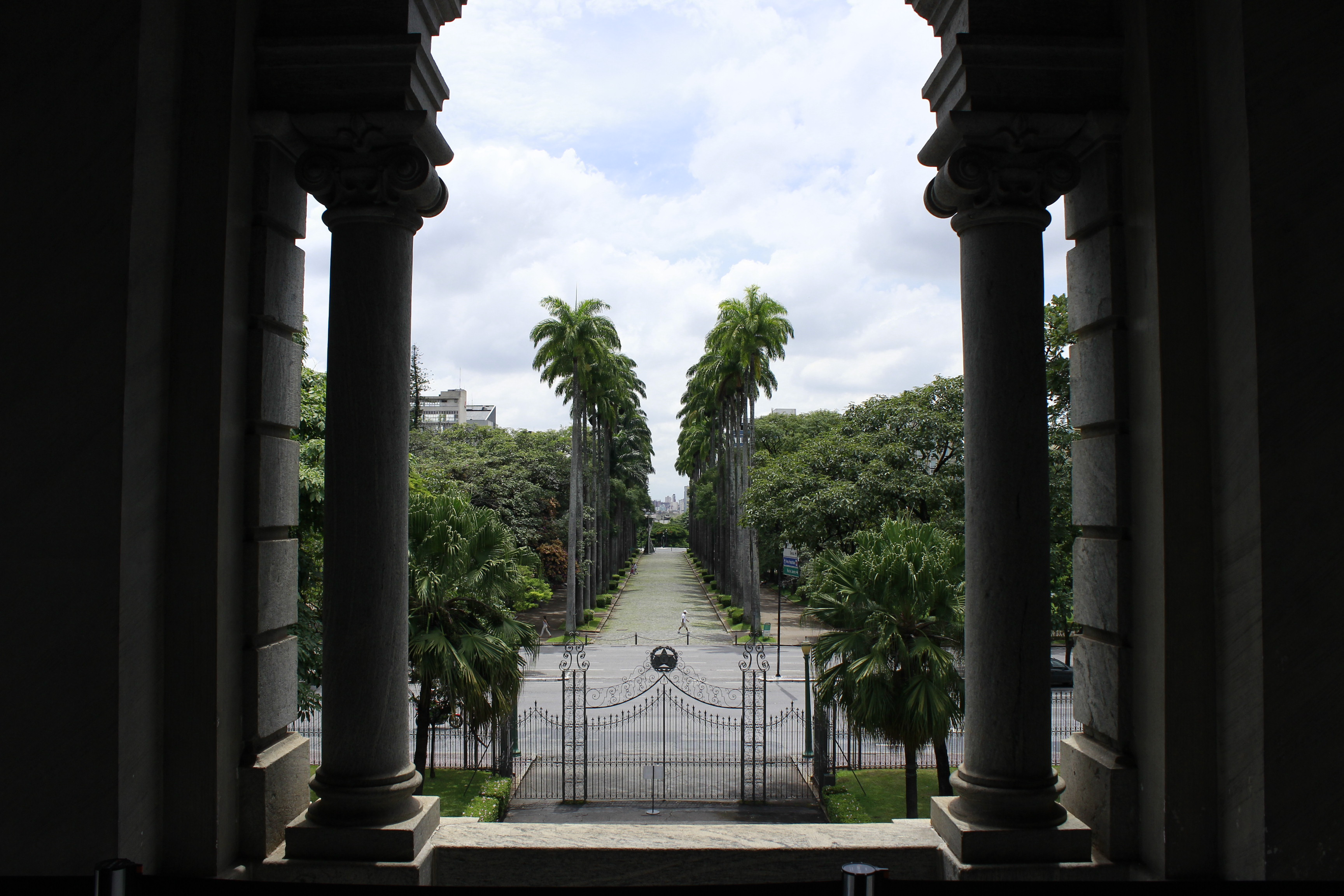
View from the palace toward Praça da Liberdade.

The Palácio da Liberdade was granted state heritage protection by Minas Gerais in 1975 under Decree No. 16,956 of January 27, 1975. The designation protected the façades, interiors, decorative elements, and gardens, as well as the fountain, sculptures, orchid house, kiosk, and other historic and artistic parts of the ensemble. The palace underwent a major restoration between 2004 and 2006.

Circuito Liberdade opened the palace and neighboring former government buildings to broader public use. The cultural circuit was inaugurated in 2010 as a network of museums and cultural institutions around Praça da Liberdade, occupying buildings that had housed state departments before their move to the Cidade Administrativa. In 2013, the palace hosted the exhibition Palácio da Liberdade: Memórias e Histórias ("Palácio da Liberdade: Memories and Histories"), a museum project using audiovisual and interactive resources to present the building and the political history of Minas Gerais.

The palace reopened for public visitation in December 2018 with a new museum design, and its visiting schedule was expanded in 2019. That year, the traditional changing-of-the-guard ceremony also returned to the palace, with performances planned for the first Sunday of each month. After closures during the COVID-19 pandemic in Brazil, the palace reopened to visitors again in October 2021.

In 2025, the 50th anniversary of the state heritage designation, the Minas Gerais State Department of Culture and Tourism announced a new restoration program for the palace, with investment exceeding R$10 million. The work covered the roof, murals, lighting, and gardens, while the building continued to receive visitors and host cultural and institutional events.

== Architecture ==
=== Exterior ===
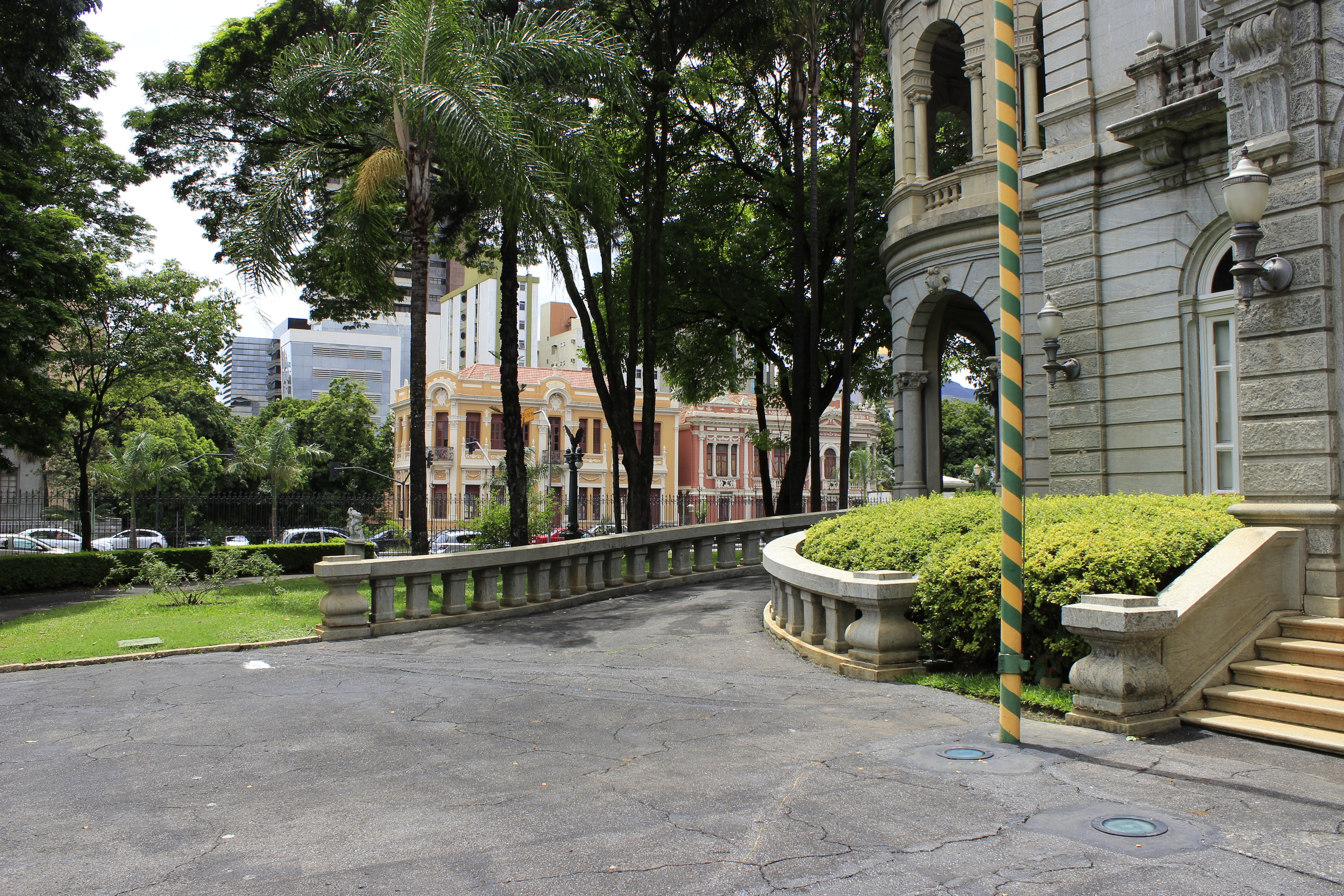
Exterior view of the entrance

The Palácio da Liberdade is an eclectic building designed by José de Magalhães. Its façade reflects French Romantic classicism, a style used in several of the first public buildings of the new capital of Minas Gerais.

The palace faces Praça da Liberdade from an elevated position in Belo Horizonte's original civic center. A central avenue lined with royal palms directs the view from the square toward the gates and main façade.

The state heritage designation protects both the exterior and interior, together with the decorative elements and gardens. The protected ensemble includes the façades, interior spaces, fountain, sculptures, orchid house, kiosk, and other features of artistic and historical value.

=== Interiors ===
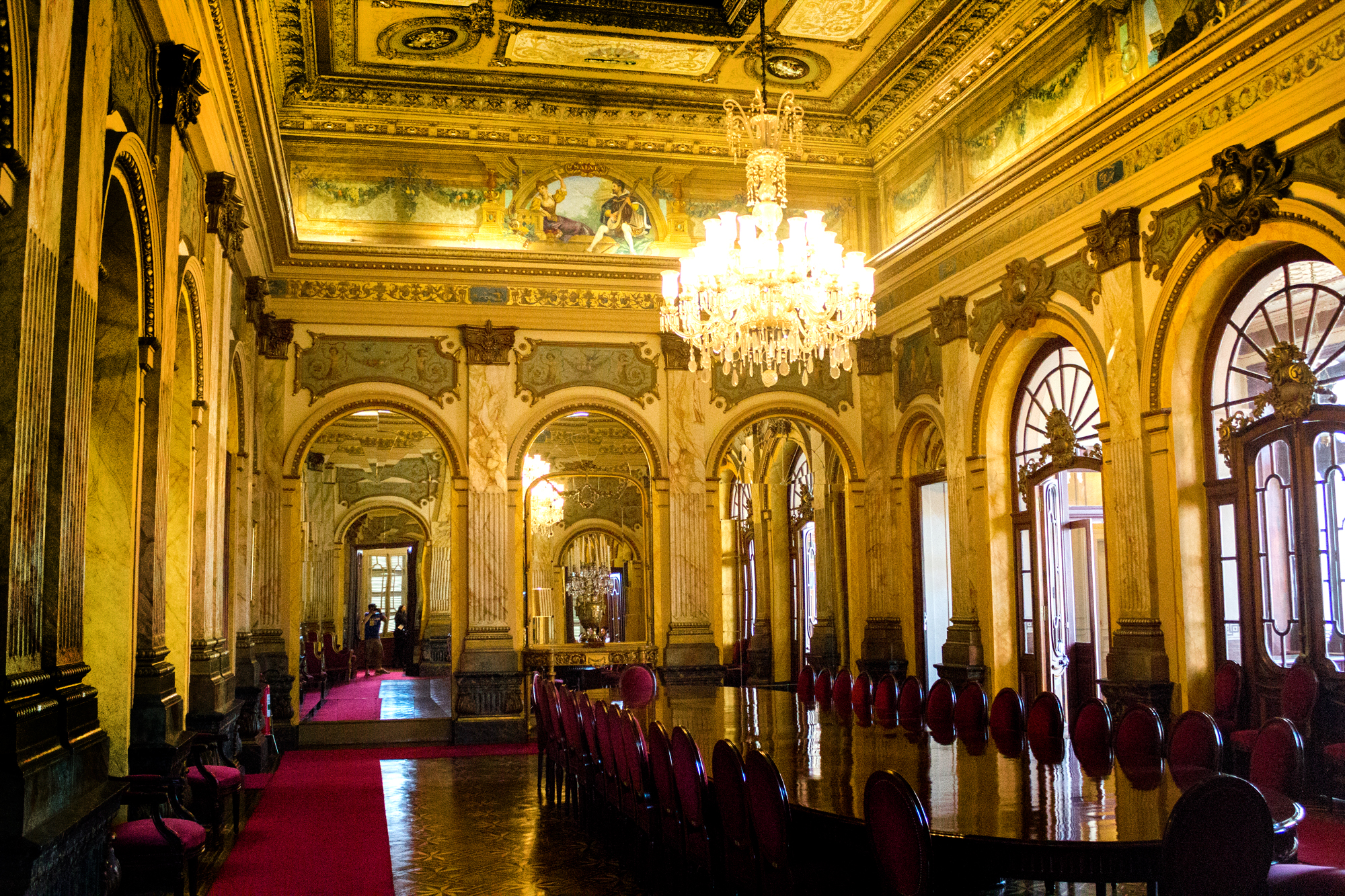
Interior of the Palácio da Liberdade.

The interiors combine several historicist styles. French Romantic classicism characterizes the façade, while the rooms contain elements of Baroque Revival, Italian Renaissance Revival, Louis XV style, (Note: The Louis XV style is a French decorative style associated with curved forms, floral ornament, and the Rococo taste of the mid-18th century.) and Moorish Revival design.

Several rooms retain decorations and works of art associated with Minas Gerais politics and the First Brazilian Republic. (Note: The First Brazilian Republic, also known in Brazil as the Old Republic, was the country's first republican period, from the end of the monarchy in 1889 to the Revolution of 1930.) The Hall of Honor (Note: The Hall of Honor is a formal reception room.) contains a ceiling painting by Antônio Parreiras, measuring 6 m (20 ft) wide and 4 m (13 ft) high, commissioned by Governor Melo Viana in 1925. The work depicts Apollo with twelve female figures. Parreiras also painted works for the room representing the arts, including painting, sculpture, literature, and music.

The main stair hall contains panels by Frederick Steckel, a German-born painter who became a Brazilian citizen, worked on official buildings in Rio de Janeiro, and served on the New Capital Construction Commission. His paintings in the palace use republican ideals and the political language of the French Revolution. Four allegories appear at the top of the dome: order, progress, fraternity, and liberty.

The Portrait Room (Note: The Portrait Room is associated with the state's official memory and the display of portraits.) contains portraits and works associated with the state government. The palace collection includes portraits of former presidents of state and governors, as well as works depicting Tiradentes, (Note: Tiradentes was executed after the failure of the Inconfidência Mineira, an 18th-century separatist movement. After the monarchy fell, republican governments presented him as a civic martyr.) whose image became closely associated with republican memory in Minas Gerais after the proclamation of the Republic.

=== Main staircase ===
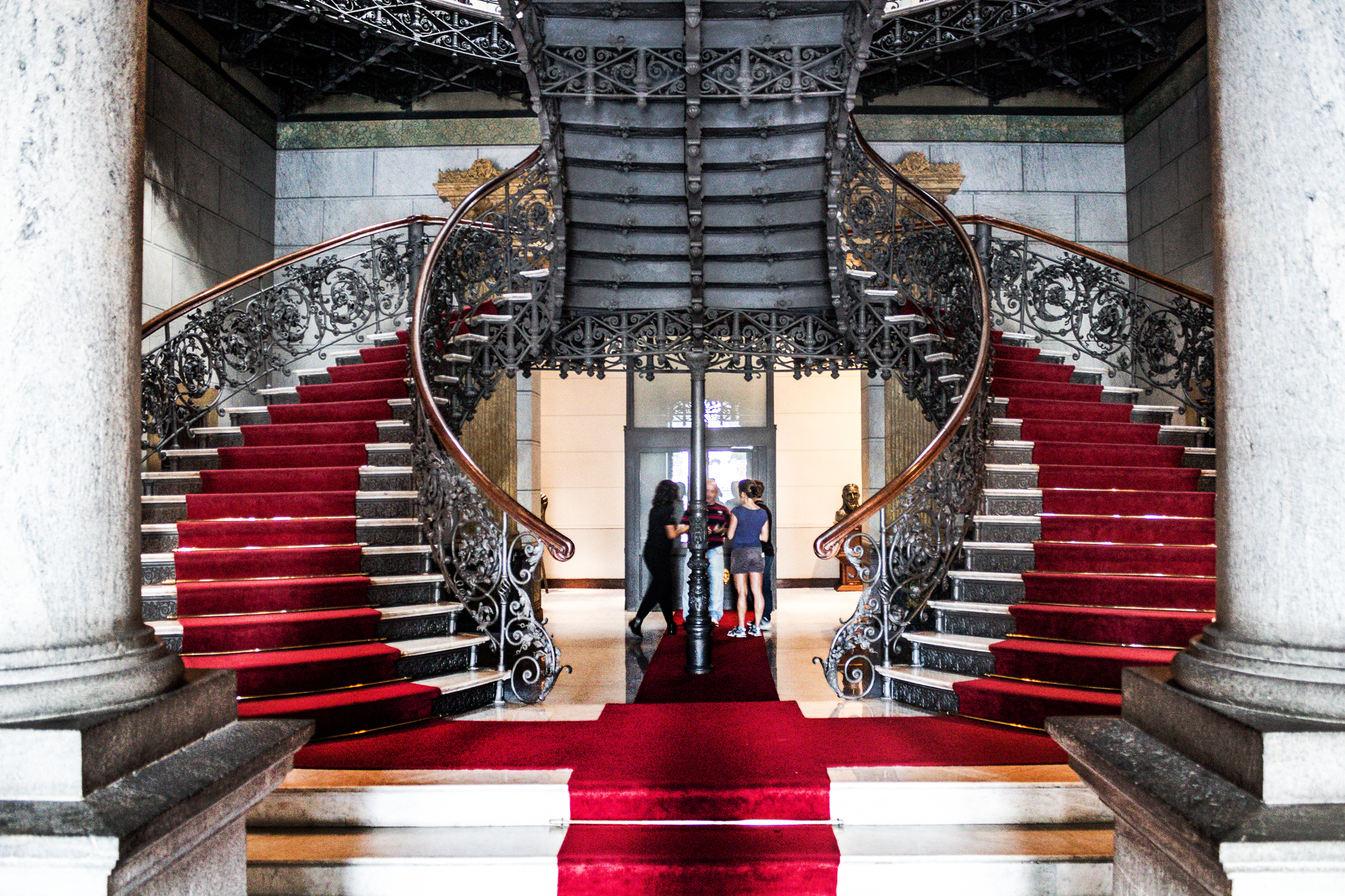
Main staircase

The main staircase is one of the palace's best-known interior features. Located in the entrance hall, it combines iron and marble with Art Nouveau ornament. Its floral decoration is phytomorphic, (Note: In art and design, phytomorphic describes forms based on plants or plant motifs.) with plant forms worked into the railings and other iron elements.

The staircase is often described as Belgian because the order passed through Bruges and involved Belgian ironwork. Its origin, however, is more complex. The staircases for the Presidential Palace and the state department buildings were ordered in 1896–1897, and their manufacture has been associated with Eisenwerk Joly of Wittenberg, Germany. The pieces arrived in Brazil in sections and were assembled inside the palace. At the time, the demountable system was a modern technical solution.

=== Decorative arts and materials ===
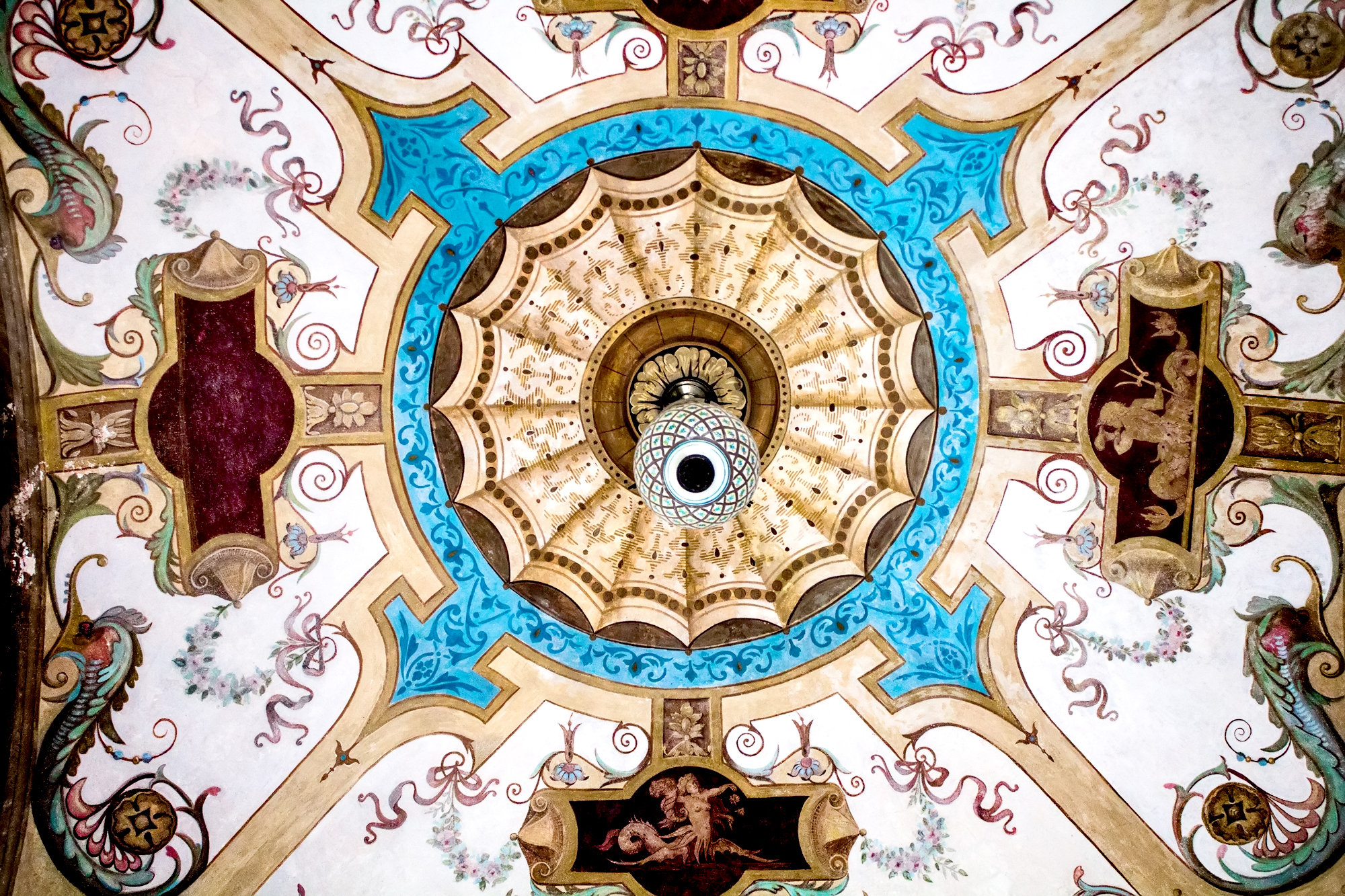
Garden and exterior view.

Many of the materials and decorative pieces used in the palace came from Europe. The building incorporated Belgian ironwork, roof tiles from Marseille, Baltic pine from Latvia, Carrara marble in the entrance hall, and parquet flooring in several rooms. Furniture, rugs, crystal, tableware, and other objects came from France.

The parquet floors date from 1898. On the second floor, red carpets protect them during public visits. The floors use small strips of mahogany and imbuia in different colors, arranged in geometric and floral patterns. The palace collection also includes furniture, works of art, and decorative objects connected with the daily lives of the governors who lived and worked there.

Ceilings and walls use several handcrafted decorative techniques. Some ceilings employ papier collé, (Note: The French expression means "pasted paper". In decoration, it refers to relief ornament made from layers of paper, glue, and water molded over a form or support.) a technique related to papier-mâché in which layers of paper, animal glue, and water are molded to form relief decoration. Frederick Steckel worked on this ornamentation in the palace. Other interior ornaments use stucco made from wood, plaster, lime, and sand. In some rooms, painted stucco imitates natural stone.

The Banquet Hall (Note: The Banquet Hall is the palace room used for formal meals and receptions.) retains a crystal chandelier dating from the late 19th or early 20th century. The European cut-crystal fixture has 40 lights, removable components, and a central metal shaft.

=== Gardens ===
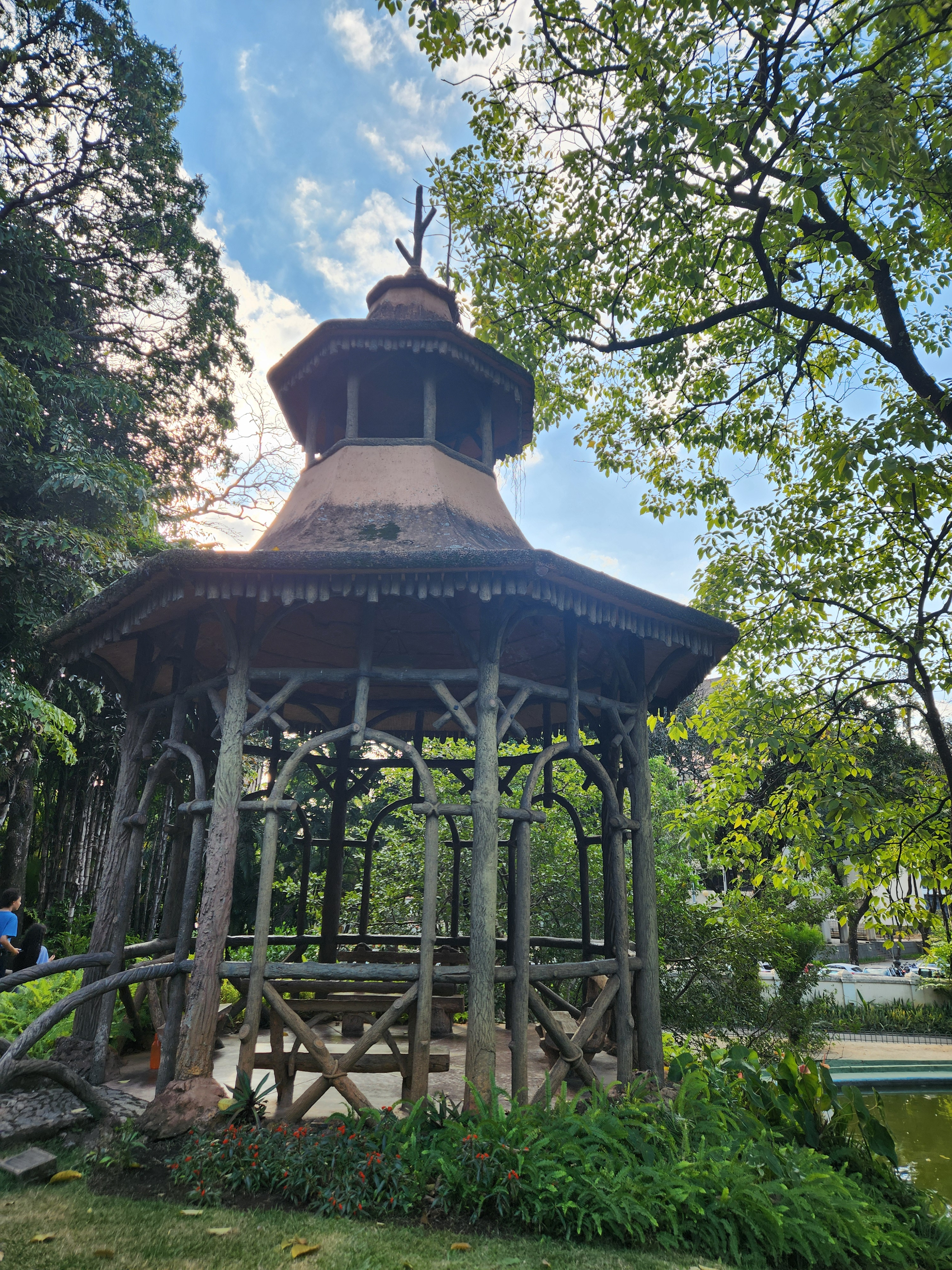
Exterior of the palace in 2024.

The palace gardens were originally open to Praça da Liberdade, without the fences that now separate them from the square. French landscape designer Paul Villon was hired in 1898 to design the gardens of the Presidential Palace and also worked on the landscaping of Praça da Liberdade. The fences were added in 1967, when increased vehicle traffic around the building made the former open arrangement difficult to maintain.

The garden design drew on English landscape traditions and included trees, ornamental plants, stones, works of art, a pond, a kiosk, and an orchid house. The gardens form part of the protected heritage ensemble together with the building, fountain, sculptures, and kiosk.

Several garden features use rocaille, (Note: In decorative and garden art, rocaille refers to ornament that imitates rocks, shells, branches, or other natural forms. In Brazil, the technique was often used in artificial grottoes, cascades, benches, and garden structures.) a technique in which reinforced cement imitates natural forms such as vines, branches, and tree trunks. At the Palácio da Liberdade, rocaille appears in the kiosk, grotto, orchid house, and a garden bench. Villon was also a mestre cascateiro, (Note: A mestre cascateiro was a craftsperson specializing in artificial rocks, grottoes, cascades, and similar landscape features.) or specialist in artificial rockwork and cascades.

The grounds also retain French marble sculptures, posts topped by metal eagles and lamps, the former orchid house, and a kiosk with handmade cement ornament imitating vines and tree trunks. The gardens later received the Sculpture Garden, (Note: The Sculpture Garden is an outdoor area containing works of modern and contemporary art.) with works including a stainless-steel sculpture by Giovanni Fantauzzi, a work by Amílcar de Castro, and A Banhista by Marco Aurélio Guimarães.

== Heritage designation ==
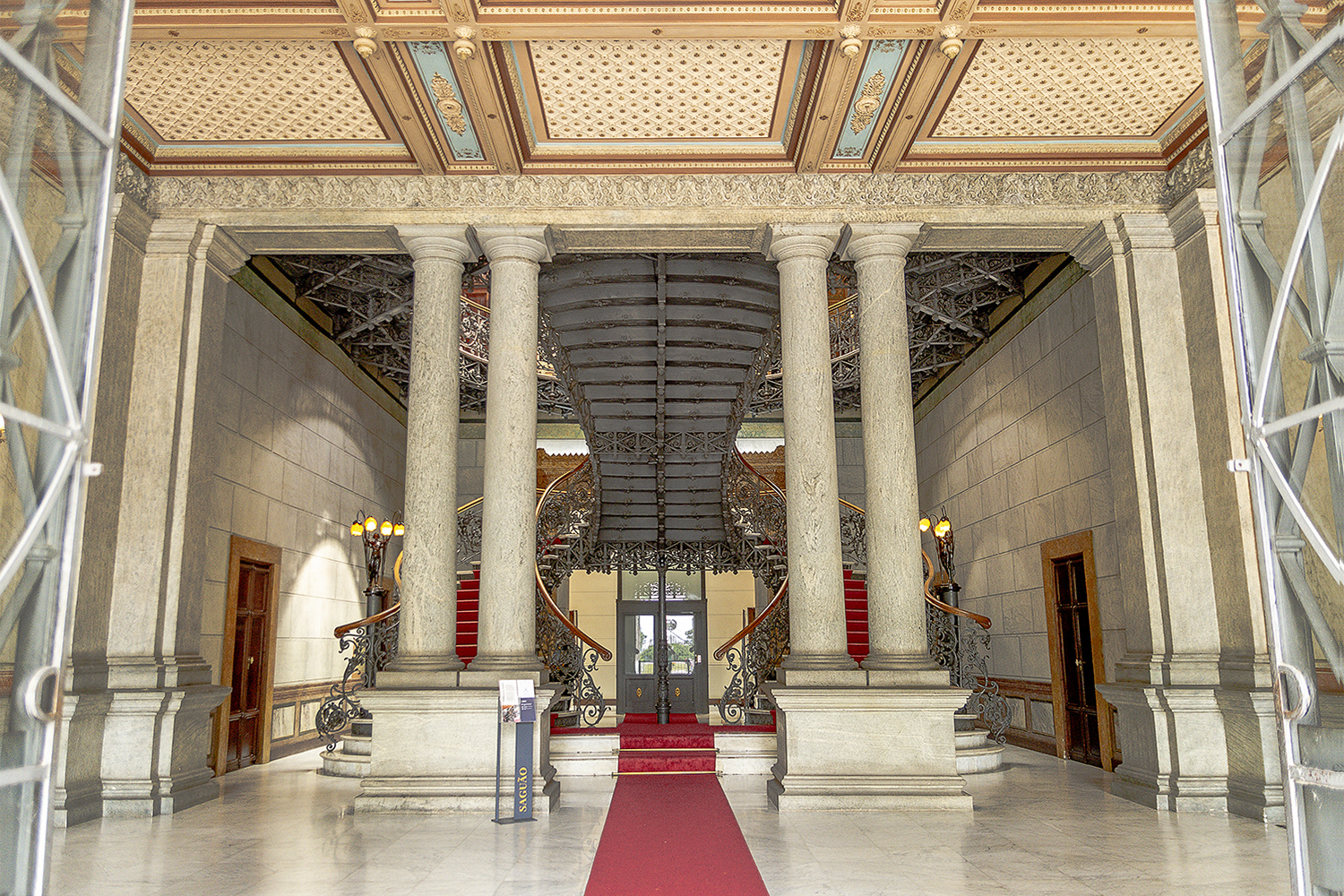
Entrance hall.

The Palácio da Liberdade was one of the first large properties protected by the Instituto Estadual do Patrimônio Histórico e Artístico de Minas Gerais (IEPHA-MG). (Note: IEPHA-MG is the state agency responsible for protecting the cultural heritage of Minas Gerais.) Decree No. 16,956 of January 27, 1975, formally recognized the historical and cultural value of the property that housed the state government.

The protection covers the palace as a whole, including the façades, interior rooms, decorative elements, gardens, fountain, sculptures, orchid house, kiosk, and other objects of artistic and historical interest. The ensemble was entered in three IEPHA-MG heritage registers: the Archaeological, Ethnographic and Landscape Register; the Fine Arts Register; and the Historical Register, which also includes works of art, old documents, and bibliographic material of cultural value. (Note: Brazilian heritage authorities traditionally record protected properties in official registers known as livros do tombo. Each register corresponds to a category of cultural value recognized by the designation.)

The palace also forms part of a broader protected urban area around Praça da Liberdade. In 1994, Belo Horizonte's Deliberative Council for Cultural Heritage included the building in the Praça da Liberdade and Adjacent Areas Urban Ensemble. (Note: An urban ensemble is a heritage protection category applied to a group of buildings, public spaces, views, and urban characteristics rather than to a single monument.) The municipal protection covers the palace, Praça da Liberdade, João Pinheiro Avenue, and nearby buildings associated with the political, civic, and architectural history of Belo Horizonte.

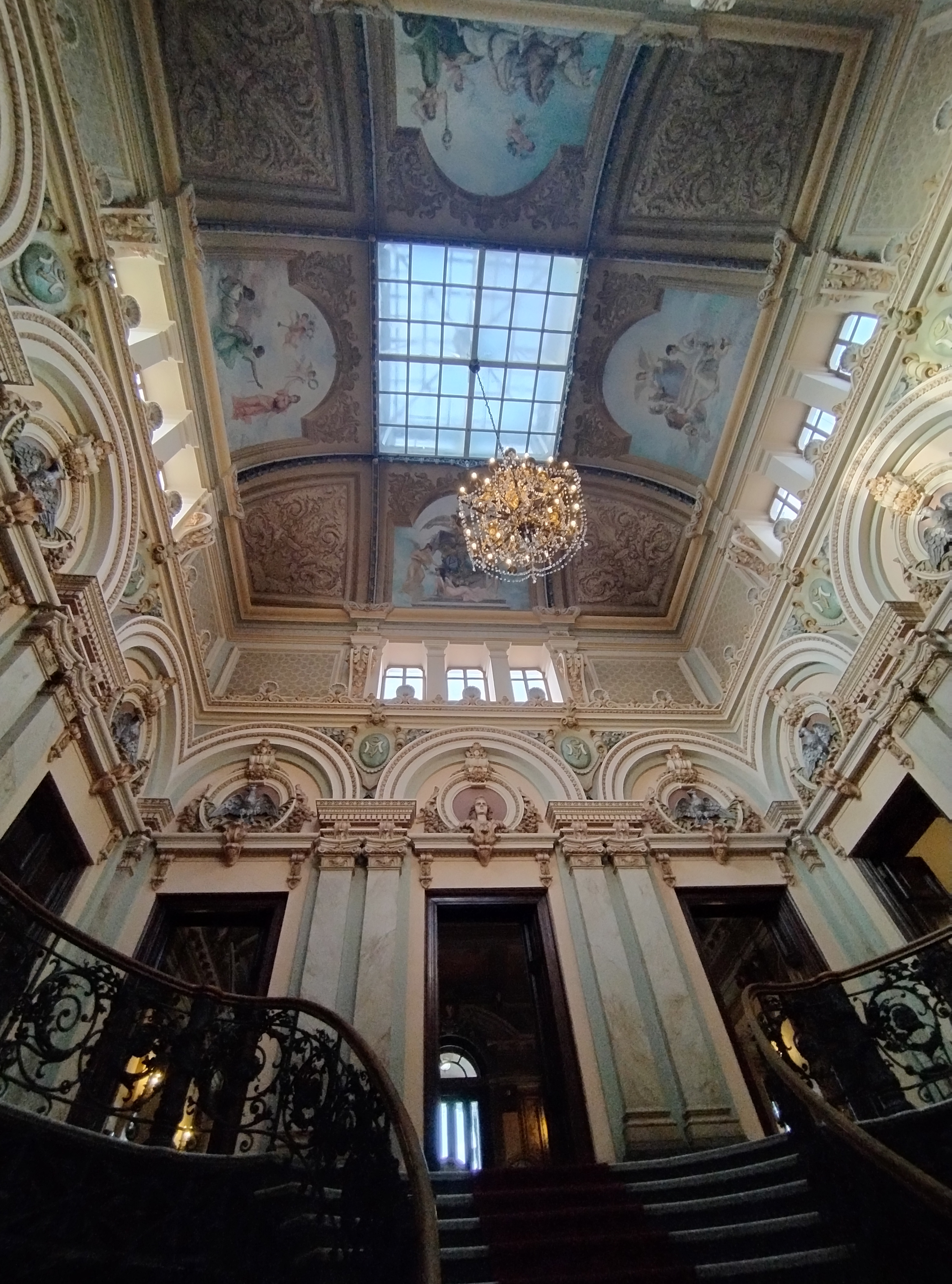
Interior view, 2024.

Between 2004 and 2006, the Palácio da Liberdade underwent an extensive restoration. One of the main problems was water infiltration, which had damaged both the building and its art collection.

A new conservation and restoration program began in the 2020s. In 2023, the government of Minas Gerais, IEPHA-MG, the Minas Gerais Public Prosecution Service, (Note: Brazil's Public Prosecution Service is an independent public institution. In addition to criminal prosecution, it can defend collective interests, including cultural heritage and the environment.) and partner institutions signed an agreement for work on the palace. The project received approximately R$10 million through environmental compensation measures (Note: In Brazil, environmental compensation measures may allocate funding or require actions to offset environmental damage or impacts. Where permitted by law, such funds may also be applied to environmental or cultural heritage projects.) administered through Plataforma Semente.

The assessment completed that year identified urgent conservation needs, particularly repairs to the roof after rain damage in previous years. The project also included work on paintings, furniture, and other parts of the palace collection.

Restoration continued in 2025, when the 50th anniversary of the state heritage designation was commemorated. The work included repairs to the roof, murals, and exterior and interior paint, as well as new interior lighting and architectural lighting for the façades and gardens. The project also covered garden conservation, cleaning of the stone façades, treatment of ceilings and moldings, and restoration of the parquet floors in the Governor's Bedroom and Queen's Bedroom.

The palace remained open to the public during the work. Part of the restoration was carried out as an open conservation studio, allowing visitors to observe portions of the work while the building continued to operate as a cultural venue.

== Public access and cultural programming ==
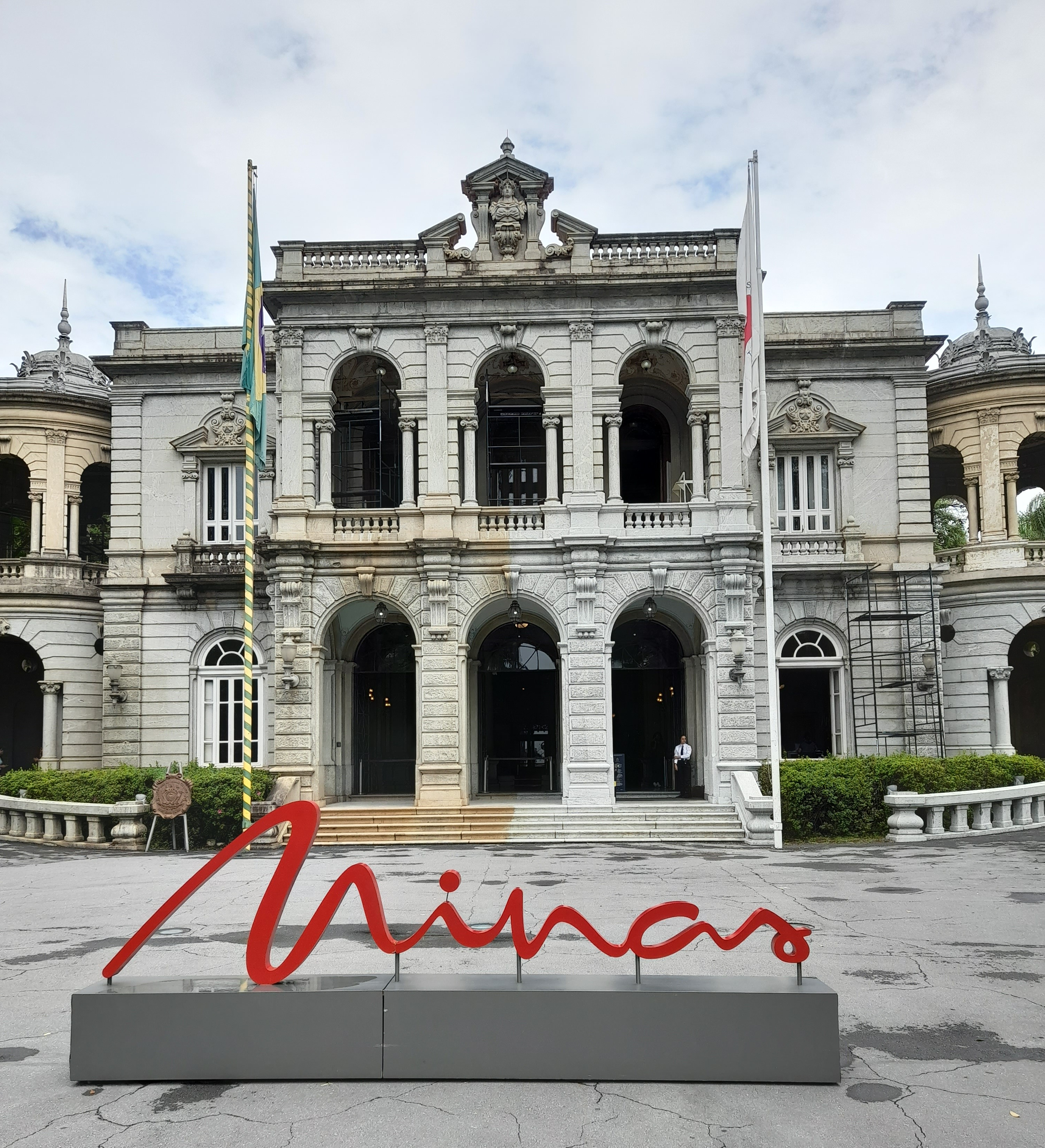
The palace in an official state government photograph.

The Palácio da Liberdade began receiving visitors more regularly after many state government functions were transferred from Praça da Liberdade to the Cidade Administrativa. The palace joined the Praça da Liberdade Cultural Circuit, later known as Circuito Liberdade, after the state government moved its principal offices to Palácio Tiradentes. The circuit brought together museums and cultural venues around Praça da Liberdade, many of them housed in former public buildings.

In 2013, the palace opened the permanent exhibition Palácio da Liberdade: Memórias e Histórias. It combined historical objects, animation, video, and digital media to recount the history of the building and Minas Gerais politics. The exhibition was officially inaugurated on July 29, 2013, and opened to the public in August. It was created through a partnership between the government of Minas Gerais and the Federation of Industries of the State of Minas Gerais (FIEMG), through SESI, with Marcello Dantas serving as artistic director and curator.

Public visits resumed in December 2018 through a program run by IEPHA-MG in partnership with APPA - Arte e Cultura. The museum design was developed by Equipe B Arquitetura, Design e Multimídias. In August 2019, the state expanded regular visiting days and school visits. More than 13,000 people had visited the palace that year before the expansion, including approximately 11,000 members of the general public and about 2,000 students.

The educational program used visits to support heritage education. Before school visits, teachers received training about the palace, cultural heritage, and classroom subjects connected with the building. By 2019, more than 200 teachers, most of them from the state school system, had taken part. During the COVID-19 pandemic, the palace also developed virtual-access materials. In 2021, virtual-tour videos of the Palácio da Liberdade and Fazenda Boa Esperança were produced for educational activities and made available on the APPA and IEPHA-MG YouTube channels.

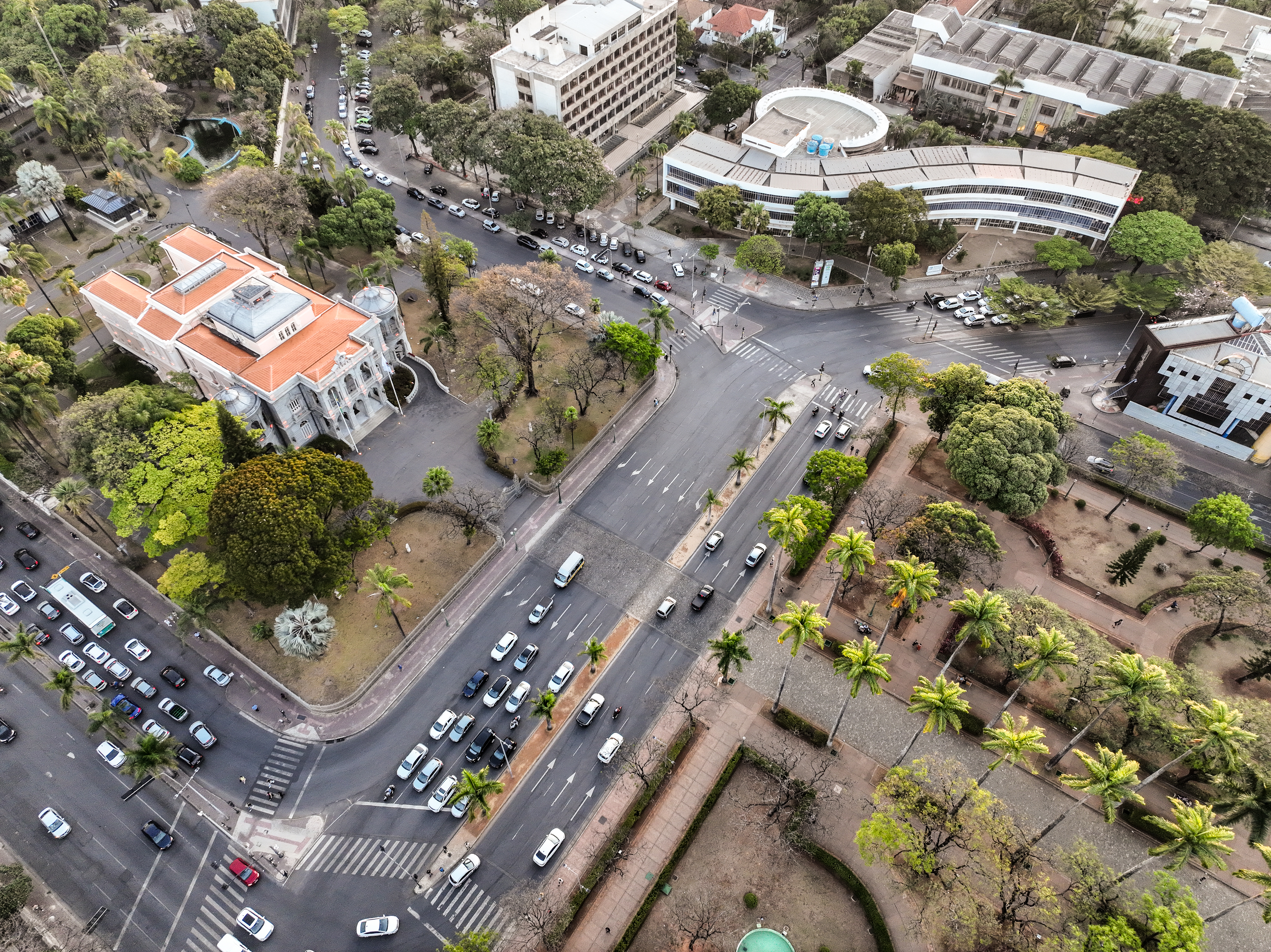
Aerial view, 2025.

The palace reopened to visitors in October 2021 after the pandemic closures. As of July 2026, general admission was free and did not require advance tickets, although access was subject to capacity limits and visitor registration on arrival. The interior was open Wednesday through Friday from noon to 5:30 p.m., with last admission at 5 p.m., and on Saturdays, Sundays, and public holidays from 10 a.m. to 5 p.m., with last admission at 4:30 p.m. The gardens remained open until 6 p.m. Because the building continues to host official functions, visiting days and hours may change according to its schedule.

Visits, interpretive tours, and educational activities are organized by the Palácio da Liberdade Visitor and Education Program, (Note: The Palácio da Liberdade Visitor and Education Program organizes visits, interpretive activities, and educational programs at the palace.) operated by APPA - Cultura & Patrimônio, (Note: APPA - Cultura & Patrimônio is a Minas Gerais cultural organization working in heritage, education, and cultural programming.) together with the government of Minas Gerais, the State Department of Culture and Tourism, Fundação Clóvis Salgado, and Circuito Liberdade. Cultural activities form part of the state Minas Criativa program. (Note: Minas Criativa is a Minas Gerais state program associated with culture and the creative economy.)

The palace offers guided and interpretive tours, workshops, storytelling, activities for children and families, heritage education projects, and events in its gardens and interior spaces. The recurring Férias no Palácio program (Note: Férias no Palácio, meaning "Vacation at the Palace", is the palace's school-vacation cultural and educational program for children and families.) offers free school-vacation activities, including creative workshops, children's interpretive tours, storytelling, architectural activities, environmental education, memory mapping, and introductory activities in Brazilian Sign Language.

The palace has also hosted temporary exhibitions and state cultural events. In 2022, it was one of the venues used to launch Via Liberdade, (Note: Via Liberdade is a cultural and tourist route organized along BR-040, the federal highway corridor connecting Rio de Janeiro, Minas Gerais, and Brasília.) a cultural and tourist route along the BR-040 corridor from Rio de Janeiro to Brasília. During the launch, the palace hosted the exhibition Já Raiou a Liberdade: Hinos do Brasil ("Liberty Has Already Dawned: Anthems of Brazil"), (Note: The title echoes patriotic language used in Brazilian civic music.) which presented manuscripts and documents associated with Brazil's national anthems, with the participation of Funarte (Note: The Fundação Nacional de Artes, or Funarte, is Brazil's federal arts foundation.) and the School of Music of the Federal University of Rio de Janeiro.

The educational program also operates outside the palace. In 2024, the Ateliê Liberdade: Travessias project (Note: In the project title, travessias, meaning "crossings", suggests movement among places, people, and forms of memory.) brought Palácio da Liberdade educators to a municipal school in Venda Nova, where they conducted workshops and storytelling activities with students. The project extended heritage education beyond the physical limits of the historic building.

== Gallery ==
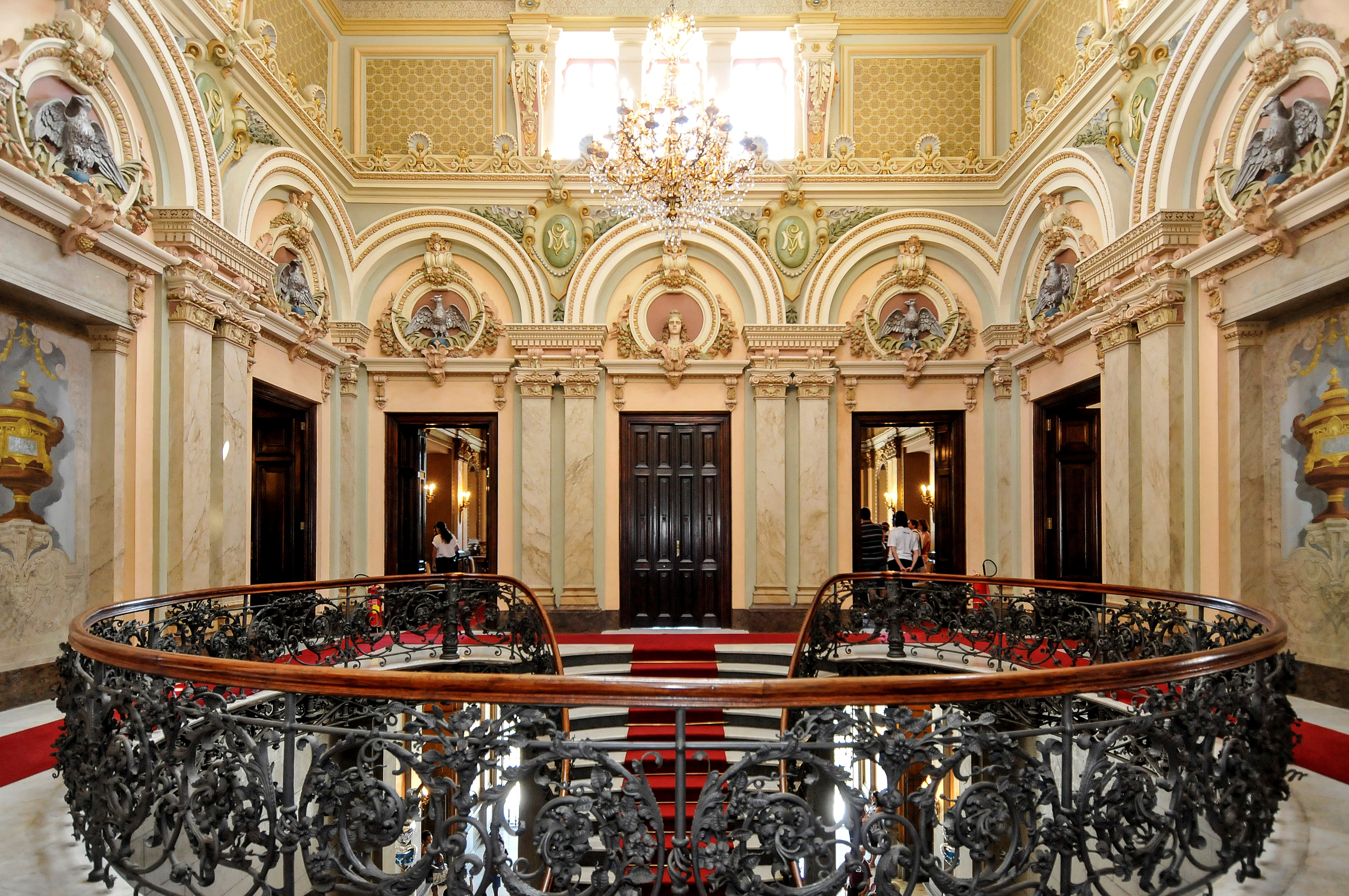
Entrance hall

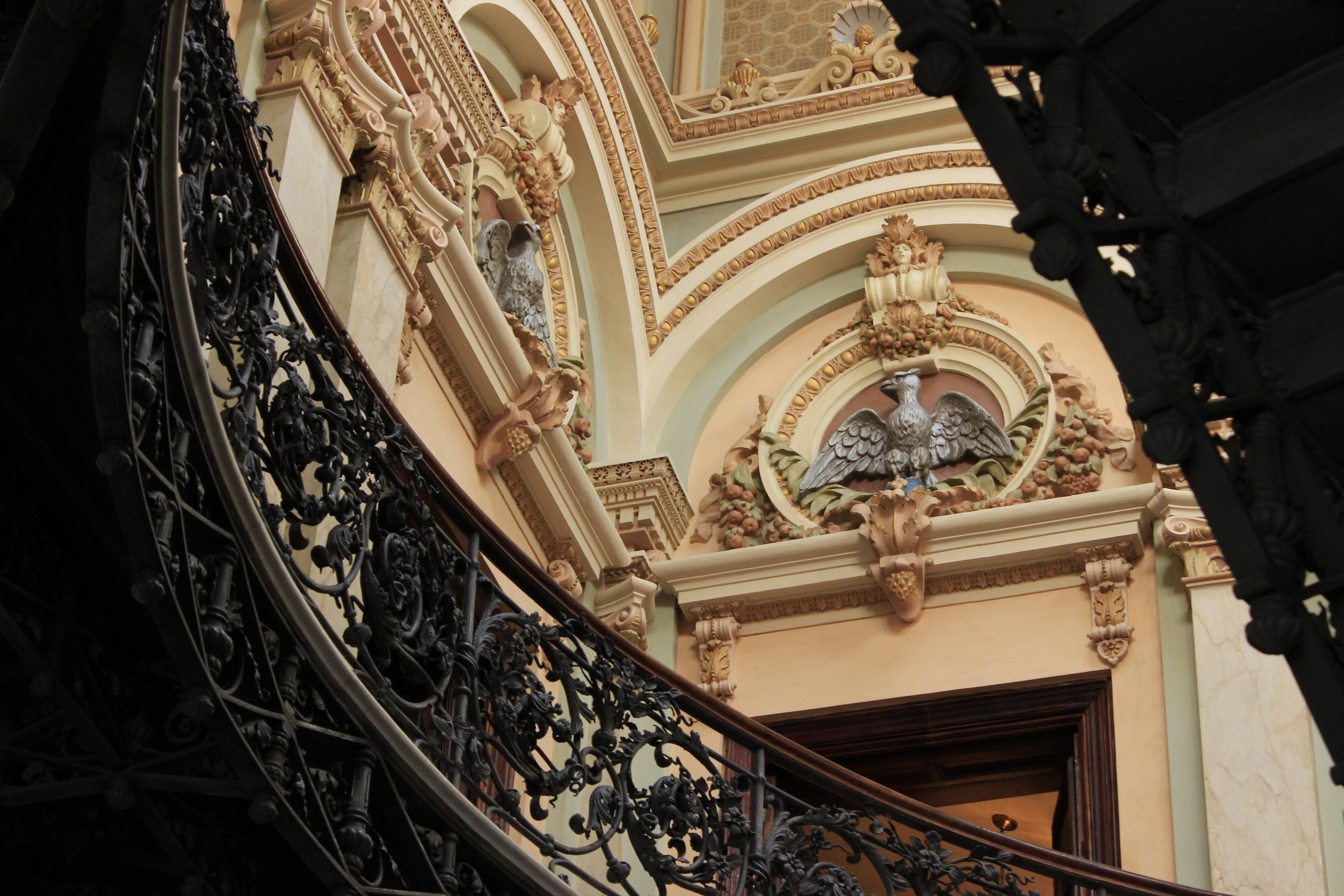
Main staircase

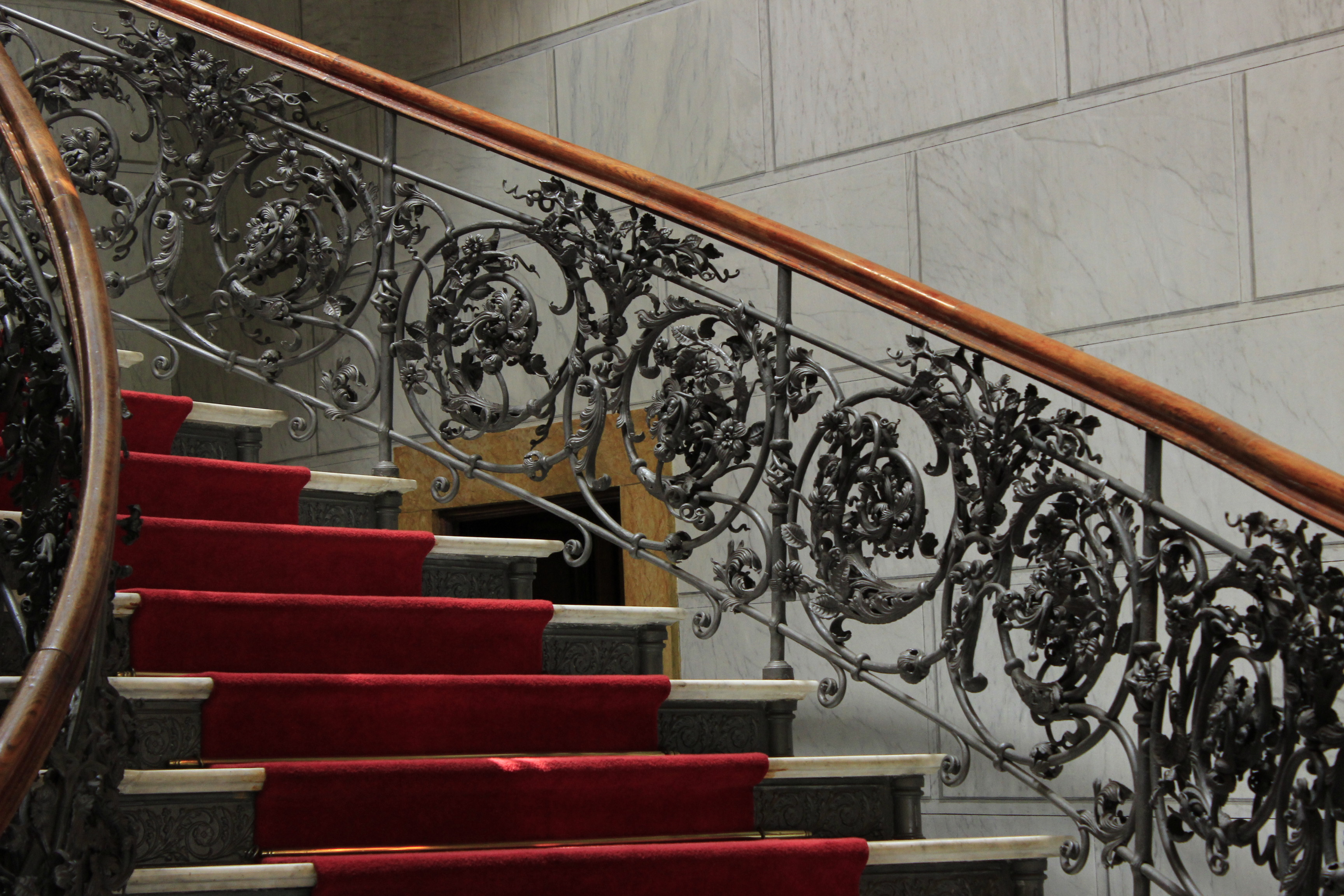
Main staircase

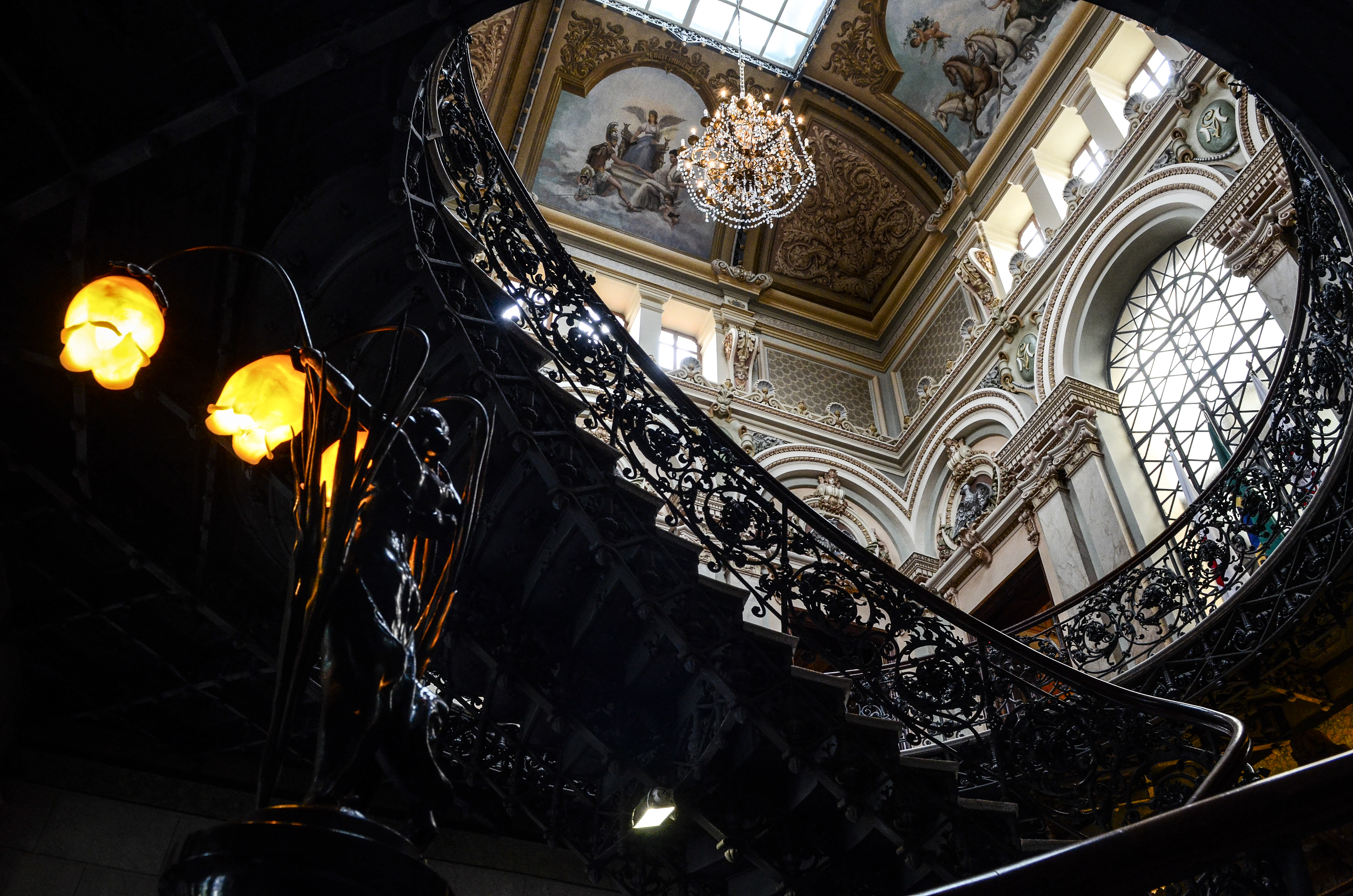
Main staircase

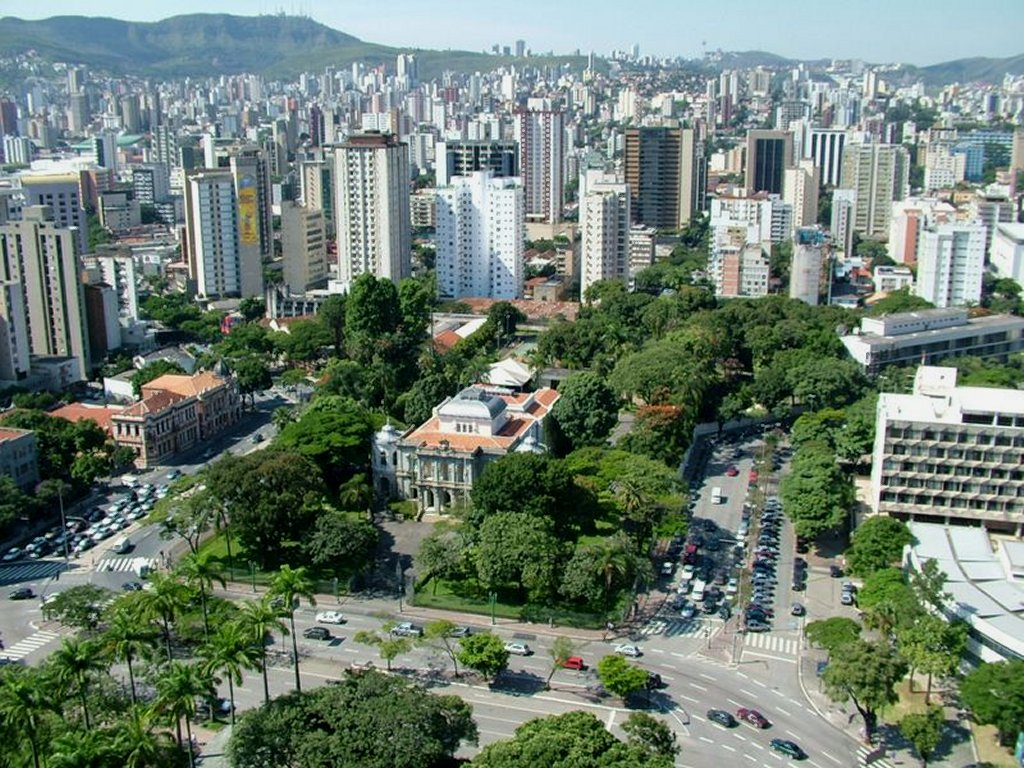
Aerial view of the palace and gardens

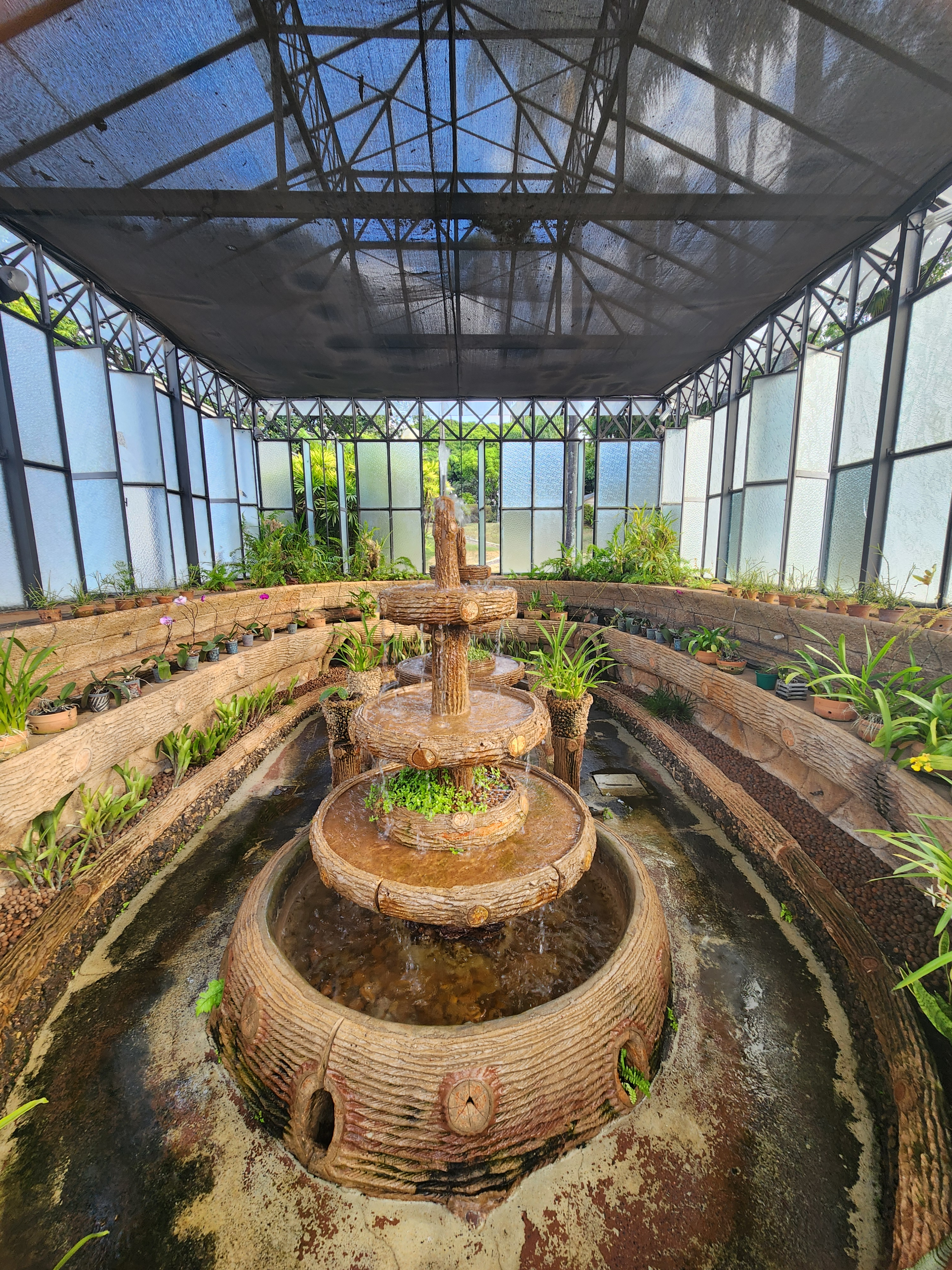
Garden fountain, 2024

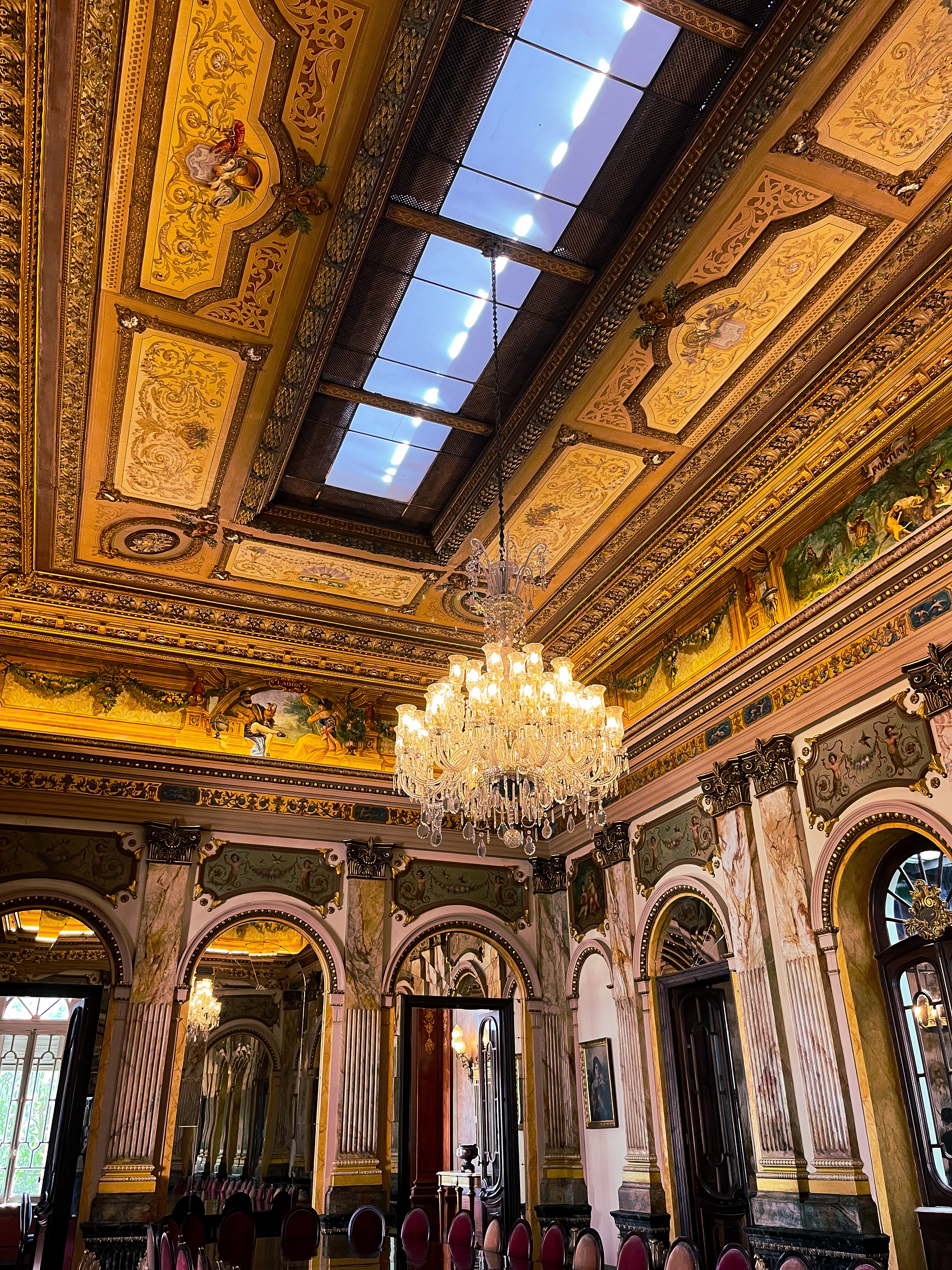
Interior view in 2025

== Bibliography ==
- Guia dos Bens Tombados: Minas Gerais [Guide to listed heritage properties: Minas Gerais] (in Brazilian Portuguese). Vol. 1. Instituto Estadual do Patrimônio Histórico e Artístico de Minas Gerais.
- Faria, Ana Maria de Moraes Nogueira Frade (2011). A legislação urbana e a ocupação de Belo Horizonte de 1897 a 2010: estudo de caso do entorno da Praça da Liberdade [Urban legislation and the occupation of Belo Horizonte from 1897 to 2010: a case study of the surroundings of Praça da Liberdade] (Thesis) (in Brazilian Portuguese). Federal University of Minas Gerais. Archived from the original on May 26, 2026.
- Senra, Vinícius Henrique Campos (2013). Estudo de caso do Circuito Cultural Praça da Liberdade [Case study of the Praça da Liberdade Cultural Circuit] (PDF) (Thesis) (in Brazilian Portuguese). Fundação João Pinheiro. Archived (PDF) from the original on April 15, 2024.
- Senra, Vinícius Henrique Campos; Oliveira, Kamila Pagel (2018). "Os desafios da governança em rede no âmbito do Circuito Liberdade" [The challenges of network governance within Circuito Liberdade] (PDF). Revista do Serviço Público (in Brazilian Portuguese). 69 (4): 983–1014. Archived (PDF) from the original on May 26, 2026.
