= Palácio das Mangabeiras =

Residence for the governor of Minas Gerais state, Brazil

Mangabeiras Palace
- Palácio das Mangabeiras
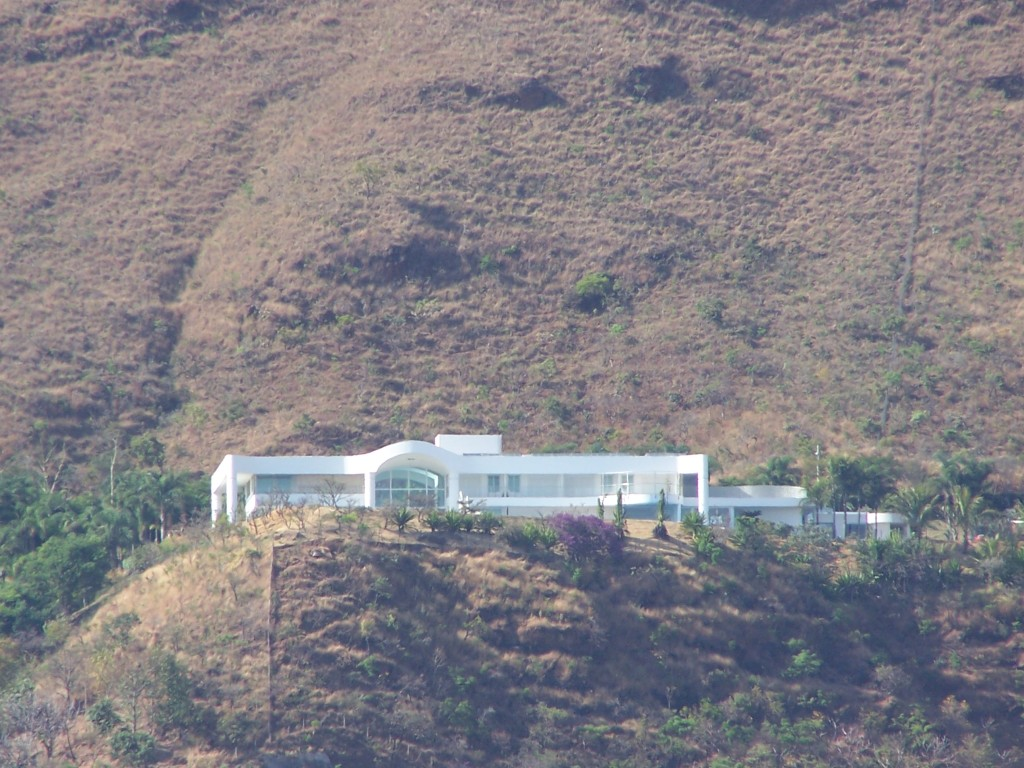
- Interactive map of the Mangabeiras Palace area

General information
- Architectural style: Brazilian Modern Architecture
- Location: Belo Horizonte, Brazil
- Coordinates: 19°57′17″S 43°54′43″W
- Construction started: 1951
- Completed: 1955

Design and construction
- Architect: Oscar Niemeyer

The Palácio das Mangabeiras was the official residence of the governor of Minas Gerais state, Brazil. It was finished in 1955 at the end Juscelino Kubitschek's term as governor. The building was designed by Oscar Niemeyer and the gardens were planned out by Roberto Burle Marx. Subsequent governors have expanded the building, altering the original layout of the building.

The palace is located at Serra do Curral, in the Mangabeiras region of Belo Horizonte. Construction started in 1951 by request of then governor Juscelino Kubitschek who wished to relocate his family to a residence other than the Palácio da Liberdade, which he considered inaquate to conciliate both professional and personal activities.

From its inauguration until 2019 it was the official residence of all the elected governors of Minas Gerais. That changed with the election of Romeu Zema, who opted to remain in his then residence. On June 5, 2019, a decree was issued that removed the building as the official residence of the governor.

In 2022 the palace, along with the 42 thousand square meters it occupies, was converted into a public park. Since then it has hosted 42 major events as well as minor ceremonies and workshops.
