= Maria Cândido (disambiguation) =

Maria Cândido (born 1939) is a Brazilian artist.

Maria Cândido may also refer to

- Maria Fernanda Cândido (born 1974), Brazilian actress
- Maria Rosa Candido (1967–1993), Italian speed skater

== See also ==
- Candido
- Cândido
- Cándido
