= Candid =

Candid may refer to:

- Candid (app), a mobile app for anonymous discussions
- Candid (organization), providing information on US nonprofit companies
- Candid Records, a record label
- Candid photography
- Impartiality
- Honesty

== Military ==
- USS Candid, Admirable-class minesweeper of the US Navy, commissioned 1943
- Ilyushin Il-76, NATO reporting name Candid, a Soviet aircraft

== See also ==
- Candida (disambiguation)
- Candide (disambiguation)
- Candido (disambiguation)
- Candidus (disambiguation)
