= Phases of Operation Car Wash =

2014–2021 Brazilian corruption investigation

Operation Car Wash Operação Lava Jato
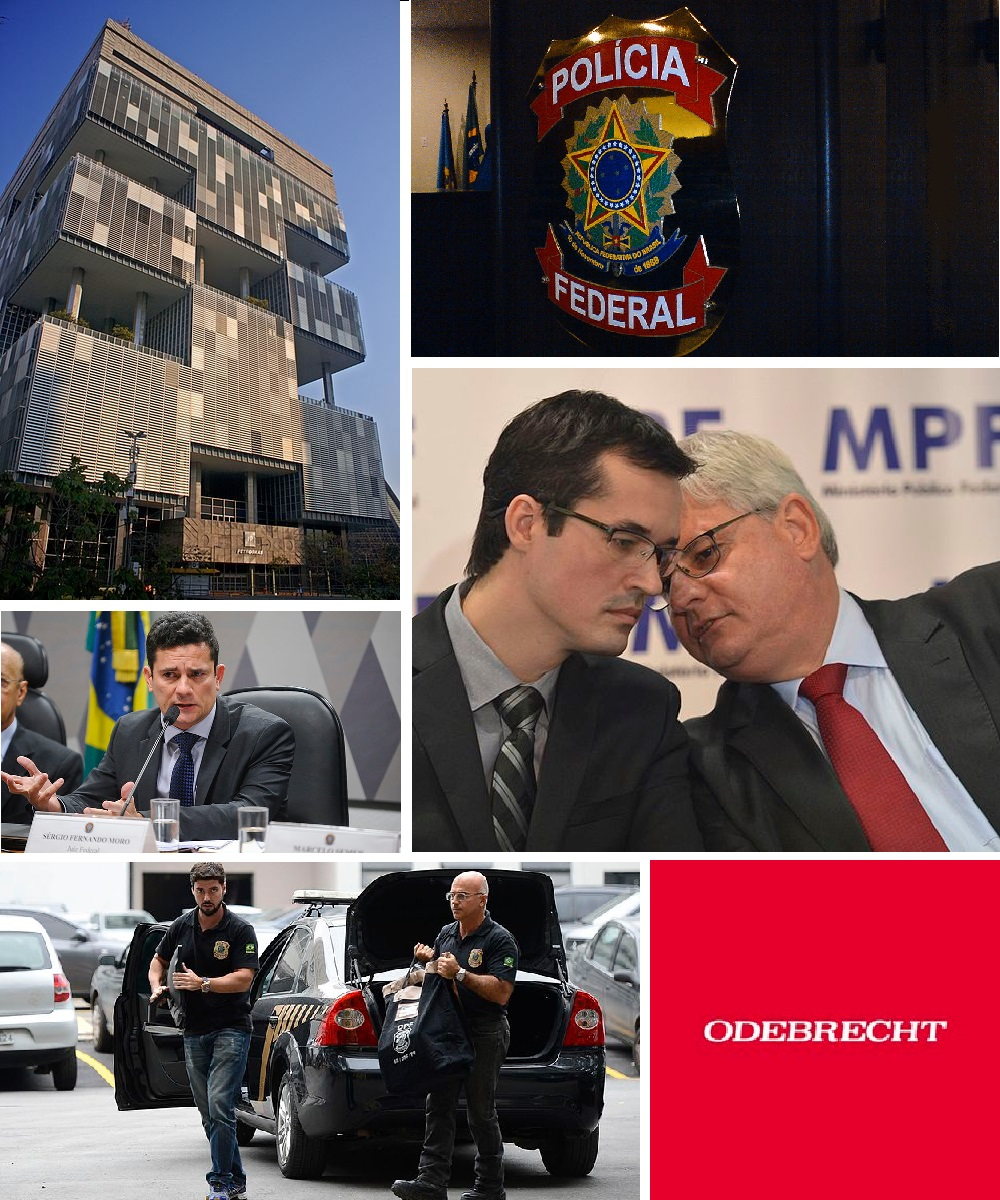
- Clockwise from top left: Headquarters of Petrobras in Rio de Janeiro; Emblem of the Federal Police of Brazil; Deltan Dallagnol with Rodrigo Janot; Odebrecht logo; Federal Police in an operation; Judge Sergio Moro
- Type: Anti-corruption
- Scope: Brazilian federal government

Participants
- Executed by: Lead prosecutor: Deltan Dallagnol (March 2014 – September 2020); Primary judge: Sergio Moro (March 2014 – November 2018); All judges: Judge: (Curitiba); Sergio Moro 17 March 2014 – 2 November 2018; Gabriela Hardt presiding as substitute 2019 to 6 March 2019; Luiz Antonio Bonat 6 March 2019 – 1 February 2021; Federal judge: (Rio de Janeiro); Marcelo Bretas (2015–2021); Federal judge: (Brasília); Vallisney de Souza Oliveira (2016–2021); Federal judge: (Porto Alegre); Leandro Paulsen (2015–2021); João Pedro Gebran Neto (2015–2021); Judge: (Superior Court of Justice); Felix Fischer (2015–2021); Judge: (Supreme Federal Court); Teori Zavascki (2014–2017); Edson Fachin (2017–2021)
- Countries participating: Brazil
- No. of countries participating: At least 11

Timeline
- Date begin: 2014
- Date end: 2021

Results
- Suspects: 429 individuals
- Indictments: 429
- Convictions: 159
- Miscellaneous results: Penalties paid by Petrobras: US$682.6 million to the Brazilian government; US$85.3 million to the US Department of Justice; US$85.3 million to the United States Securities and Exchange Commission; R$6.2 billion (US$2.5 billion) identified as misappropriated from Petrobras; R$46.3 billion (c. US$9 billion) reimbursement requested by Petrobras; R$3.28 billion (US$912 million) recovered

A long series of criminal investigations have occurred in Brazil associated with Operation Car Wash. The first investigation was launched in March 2014, and is now known as phase 1 of the investigation, with subsequent inquiries numbered sequentially and having code names such as phase 2 (Operation Bidone), phase 3 (Operation Casablanca), and so on. By February 2021, there were 80 announced phases of Operation Car Wash.

Besides these, there were other investigations that are considered offshoots of Operation Car Wash.

Investigations by operation name
- Acarajé
- Ad Infinitum
- Aletheia
- Appium
- BOEMAN
- Bidone
  - II
  - III
- Blackout
- Buona Fortuna
- Calicute
- Car Wash
- Carbonara Chimica
- Casablanca
- Cobra
- Corrosion
- Déjà vu
- Dolce Vita
- Doomsday
- Dragon
- Erga Omnes
- Free Pass
- Greenwich
- In the beginning
- Monaco Connection
- My Way
- Nessun Dorma
- No Limits
  - II
  - III
  - IV
  - V
- Óbolo
- Omertà
- Overdraft
- Pentiti
- Pixuleco
  - II
- Polishing in Portugal
- Pseudea
- Radioactivity
- Rock city
- Shoulder to shoulder
- Sothis
  - II
- Sovrapprezzo
- Tango & Cash
- To sail is necessary
- Triple X
- Vernissage
- Vitória de Pirro
- What country is this?
- Xepa
- X-Files

== Background ==
Operation Car Wash (Portuguese: Operação Lava Jato) was an investigation into money laundering and political corruption in Brazil, which has been led by investigative judges, and carried out by the Federal Police.

Since its initiation, many investigations have been conducted by the Public Prosecutor's Office, the Attorney General's Office and the Federal Police from documents collected from search warrants, condução coercitiva (Note: Condução coercitiva – literally, coercive conveyance; a compulsory order to appear, to assist in an investigative or judicial proceeding, either as a victim, a witness, an expert, and so on. Not an arrest, but has the power of police enforcement behind it to compel compliance.) warrants, and documents and testimonials obtained in cases of sovereign immunity. The goal of the investigation is to ascertain the extent of the money laundering scheme, estimated to be R$6.4–42.8 billion (US$2–13 billion), largely through embezzlement of Petrobras funds. At least eleven other countries, mostly in Latin America, were involved, and the Brazilian company Odebrecht was deeply implicated. The U.S. Securities and Exchange Commission announced that the $853 penalty assessed by the DOJ was in addition to an agreed total of $933 million in disgorgement and prejudgment interest, in connection with a $2.5 billion overstatement of assets in a US$10 billion stock offering completed in 2010.

It has resulted in more than a thousand judicial warrants being served for three investigative judges. Politicians from Brazil's largest parties, including former presidents of Brazil, presidents of the Chamber of Deputies and the Federal Senate, and state governors are involved, as well as businessmen from large Brazilian companies. Originally a money laundering investigation, it expanded to cover allegations of corruption at the state-controlled oil company Petrobras, where executives allegedly accepted bribes in return for awarding contracts to construction firms at inflated prices.

The investigation is called "Operation Car Wash" because it was first uncovered at a car wash in Brasília. The Federal Police have called it the largest corruption investigation in the country's history. Petrobras later agreed to an $853 million settlement with the US Department of Justice on charges its executives violated the US Foreign Corrupt Practices Act, "paying hundreds of millions of dollars in bribes", then covering them up.

== In Brazil ==
=== 2014 ===
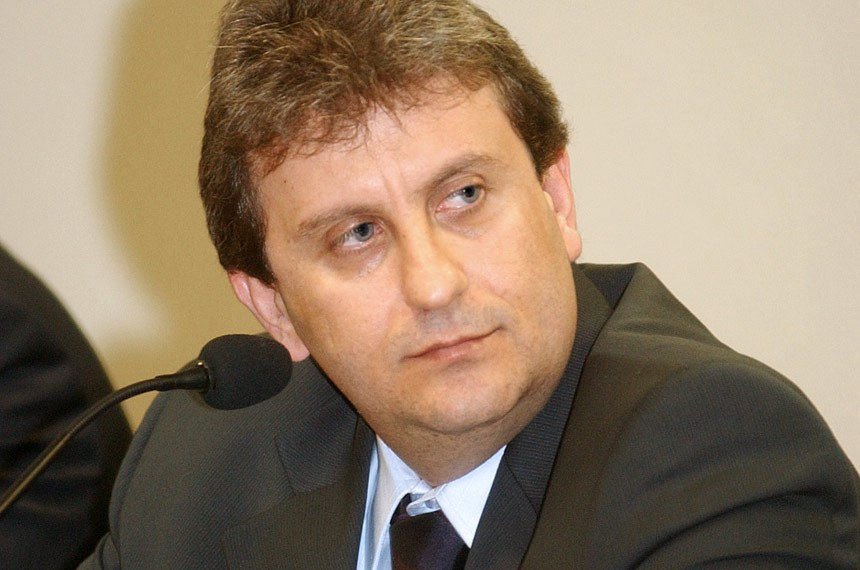
Alberto Youssef was a target of the initial investigation.

==== Phase 1 — Operation Car Wash ====
On 17 March 2014, the Federal Police of Brazil (PF) initiated Operation Car Wash (Portuguese: Operação Lava Jato) with the temporary and pre-trial detention of seventeen people in seven states, including money changer Alberto Youssef. Five million reals ($1.3 million) were seized in cash, 25 luxury cars, jewelry, paintings and weapons.

==== Phase 2 — Operation Bidone ====
On 20 March 2014, the Federal Police launched the second phase of Operation Car Wash, called Operation Bidone, serving six search and seizure warrants and one temporary arrest warrant, namely for former Petrobras Director of Procurement Paulo Roberto Costa.

==== Phase 3 — Operation Dolce Vita ====
On 11 April 2014, the Federal Police launched phase 3, Operation Dolce Vita, serving sixteen search and seizure warrants, three temporary arrest warrants and six condução coercitiva warrants. The lawsuit sought to gather evidence about the connection between Paulo Roberto Costa and black marketeer Alberto Youssef at the company Ecoglobal Ambiental. The company had at least one contract of 443 million reals with Petrobras. He is suspected of offering a R$110,000 ($28,000) bribe from Youssef to Deputy Luiz Argolo, depositing the money in the accounts of a cattle trader (Júlio Gonçalves de Lima Filho) and a transportation company (União Brasil Transporte e Serviços ) at the Deputy's request. The Parliamentary Investigation Commission into Petrobras (Note: Investigation of four suspected violations involving Petrobras: 1. acquisition of the Pasadena refinery in Texas (USA); 2. indications of bribery payments to state-owned employees by the Dutch company SBM Offshore; 3. allegations that platforms were being launched without essential safety equipment; 4. evidence of overpricing in refinery construction, including the Abreu e Lima refining plant in Pernambuco.) and the Joint Parliamentary Committee of Inquiry (Comissão Parlamentar Mista de Inquérito; CPMI) of Petrobras were established in the Senate.

==== Phase 4 — Operation Casablanca ====
On 11 June 2014, the Federal Police launched Operation Casablanca with a search warrant and a warrant for remand against Paulo Roberto Costa, who was again arrested.

==== Phase 5 — Operation Bidone II ====
On 1 July 2014, the Federal Police launched phase 5, Operation Bidone II, serving seven search warrants, one temporary arrest warrant and one condução coercitiva warrant. The executive João Procópio Junqueira Pacheco de Almeida Prado was arrested in São Paulo as manager of the Swiss bank accounts of money changer Youssef. Five million reais ($1.3 million) were frozen in the Swiss accounts.

==== Phase 6 — Operation Bidone III ====
On 22 August 2014, the Federal Police launched phase 6, Operation Bidone III, serving eleven search and seizure warrants and one for condução coercitiva at companies with ties to Costa. First arrested in March 2014 on a charge of concealing documents, Costa was released 59 days later, then again arrested days later when authorities discovered he had failed to mention a Portuguese passport and US$23 million in Swiss bank accounts.

==== Phase 7 — Operation Doomsday ====
On 14 November 2014, the Federal Police launched Operation Doomsday, (Operação Juízo Final) mobilizing 300 officers to serve 49 search warrants, six pre-trial detention warrants, 21 temporary arrest and nine condução coercitiva compulsory appearance detentions, arresting presidents and directors of large Brazilian companies such as Construtora OAS, IESA Óleo e Gás, Camargo Corrêa Construções, UTC Engenharia, Engevix and Construtora Queiroz Galvão, which had a combined R$59 billion ($25.07 billion) in contracts with Petrobras between 2003 or 2014. In addition to Youssef and Costa, the accused included Nestor Cerveró, a former international director at Petrobras, Dalton Santos Avancini, president of Camargo Corrêa, Jean Alberto Luscher Castro, CEO of Galvão Engenharia, José Adelmário Pinheiro Filho, president of OAS, and Ricardo Ribeiro Pessoa, president of UTC Engenharia.

Camargo Corrêa was the lead contractor on a R$24 billion ($10.2 billion) construction project, the Abreu e Lima refinery in Pernambuco, at the time the most expensive in the country. According to Engevix CEO Gerson Almada, the construction companies entered into consulting agreements with front companies which between them received millions in payment.

Dario de Queiroz Galvão Filho was sentenced to 20 years and six months imprisonment for active corruption, money laundering and criminal association. Erton Medeiros Fonseca received 13 years and five months of imprisonment for active corruption, money laundering and criminal association. Convicted of active corruption and criminal association, Jean Alberto Luscher Castro was given fourteen years and four months in prison. The men appealed their sentences.

Executives of Mendes Junior were also implicated in this phase, over contracts connected to the Paulínia Refinery (Replan), the Getúlio Vargas Refinery (Repar), the Rio de Janeiro Petrochemical Complex (Comperj), the Barra do Riacho Waterway Terminal, the Gabriel Passos Refinery (Regap), and at the Ilha Comprida and Redonda Waterway Terminals. Former vice-president Sergio Cunha Mendes was sentenced to 19 years and four months for his part in the kickback scheme. Paulo Roberto Costa was also among those convicted, and remained under house arrest at his home in Rio de Janeiro.

=== 2015 ===
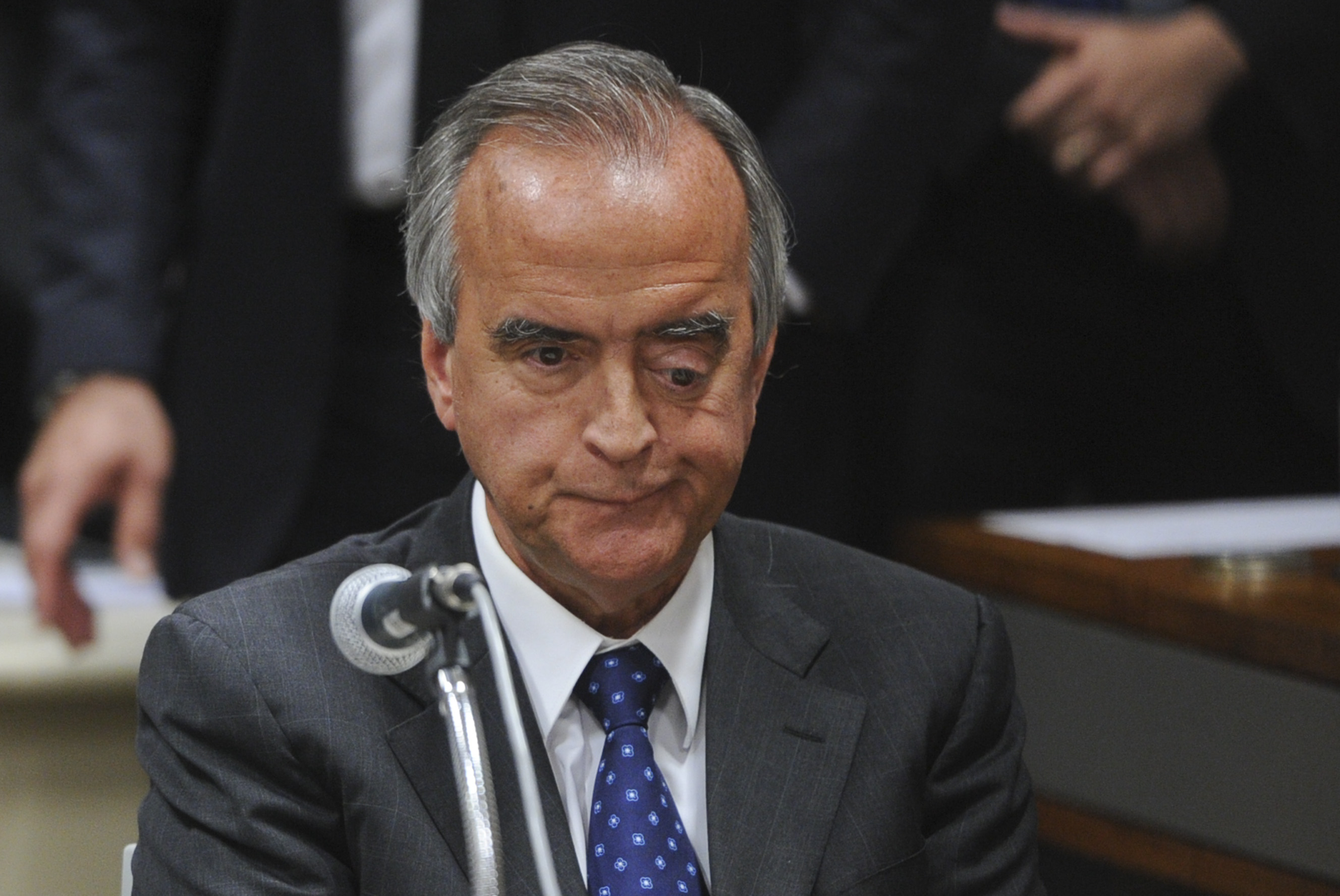
Nestor Cerveró, ex-director of Petrobras, was arrested in the 8th phase.

==== Phase 8 — unnamed ====
On 14 January 2015, the Federal Police (PF) served a preventive arrest warrant against Nestor Cerveró, accused of disposing of possibly illegally-obtained assets. Cerveró was arrested on landing at Tom Jobim International Airport in Rio de Janeiro.

==== Phase 9 — Operation My Way ====
On 5 February 2015, Federal Police launched the ninth phase of Car Wash, called "My Way". It has served 62 search and seizure warrants, temporary and preventive arrests and enforcement orders in four states of Brazil, to gather evidence about operators who intermediated the payment of bribes and kickbacks under Petrobras. Evidence was also collected regarding payments under BR Distribuidora, a subsidiary of Petrobras. During this phase forty-eight works of art were seized at Zwi Skornicki's house and taken to the Oscar Niemeyer Museum. Zwi Skornicki was named as one of the operators of the corruption scheme.

==== Phase 10 — Operation What country is this? ====
On 16 March 2015, around 40 police officers carried out 18 arrests in Rio de Janeiro and São Paulo. The operation was codenamed "Operation what country is this?" ("Que país é esse?") after comments made by Renato Duque to his lawyer as he was being detained by the police in 2014. The ex-director of Petrobras, Renato Duque, was arrested in his Rio de Janeiro home, and businessman Adir Assad was arrested in São Paulo. Individuals detained in this action were taken to Curitiba. On 27 March, the federal police arrested Dário Queiroz Galvão, one of the partners of the firm Galvão Engenharia. Guilherme Esteves de Jesus, one of the suspects investigated in phase 9 of Operation Car Wash, was arrested in Rio de Janeiro for bribes paid to the Jurong Shipyard. Both Queiroz Galvão and Esteves de Jesus were wanted under pre-trial arrest warrants and were taken to police headquarters in Curitiba. On 8 April 2015, the Federal Justice Court of Paraná seized 163.5 million reals ($41,000,000) from Queiroz Galvão's company, a figure corresponding to the amount of money that was due them from a writ of payment (precatório (Note: Precatório – A writ of payment; a payment request issued by the judiciary to a governmental entity like a state, a municipality, or the Union itself, as a result of a court judgment against them. After winning a case against the government, the plaintiff, who can be a physical or juridical person, becomes the holder of a certificate named the "Precatório", which is a judicial recognition of a debt that the public entity owes the plaintiff in the suit. This places the entity in the position of being a judgment debtor. Conditions of payment are covered by the Constitution.)) from the state of Alagoas.

==== Phase 11 — Operation In the beginning ====
On 10 April 2015, the Federal Police began the phase called "In the beginning", (A Origem) fulfilling 32 warrants, including seven for arrest, sixteen search and seizure and nine Condução coercitiva warrants. This phase had operations in six states: Paraná, Bahia, Ceará, Pernambuco, Rio de Janeiro and São Paulo. In this phase, former federal deputy André Luiz Vargas Ilário, Leon Vargas (brother of André Vargas), former deputy Luiz Argôlo, Élia Santos da Hora (secretary of Argôlo), former federal deputy Pedro Corrêa, Ivan Mernon da Silva Torres and Ricardo Hoffmann were arrested.

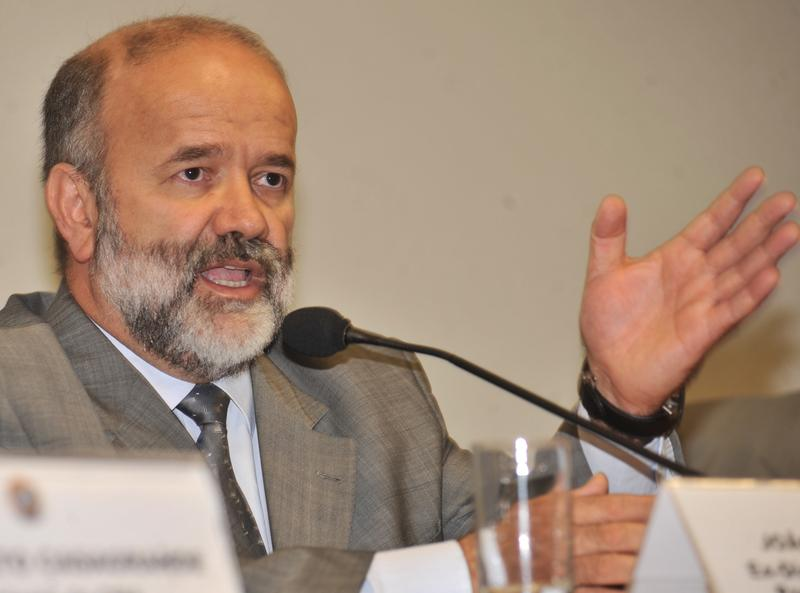
João Vaccari Neto was arrested in phase twelve.

==== Phase 12 — unnamed ====
On 15 April 2015, PF served two arrest warrants, one of condução coercitiva and one of search and seizure in São Paulo. João Vaccari Neto, PT treasurer, was arrested. Vaccari's sister-in-law, Marice Correa de Lima, was on the run until 17 April 2015. She later surrendered to the police. Vaccari's wife, Gisela Lima, had a warrant for condução coercitiva, and was released after making a statement. The Federal Police forwarded to the Federal Public Prosecution Service (MPF) on 11 May 2015, thirty indictments against 22 people, investigated in the 11th phase, to investigate corruption crimes, contract fraud, money laundering and criminal organization, among others.

==== Phase 13 — unnamed ====
On 21 May 2015, Federal Police carried out the 13th phase of Operation Lava Jet in the states of Minas Gerais, Rio de Janeiro and São Paulo. An arrest warrant was served on Milton Pascowitch; in addition one warrant for condução coercitiva was served, and four for search and seizure. The warrants for search and seizure in São Paulo were made at the residence of José Adolfo Pascowitch, Milton's brother. The other two were served in Rio de Janeiro and Minas Gerais. According to MPF, JD Consultoria, a company owned by José Dirceu, received more than 1.4 million reals ($350,000) from Jamp Engenheiros Associados Ltd, a company owned by Milton Pascowitch.

==== Phase 14 — Operation Erga Omnes ====
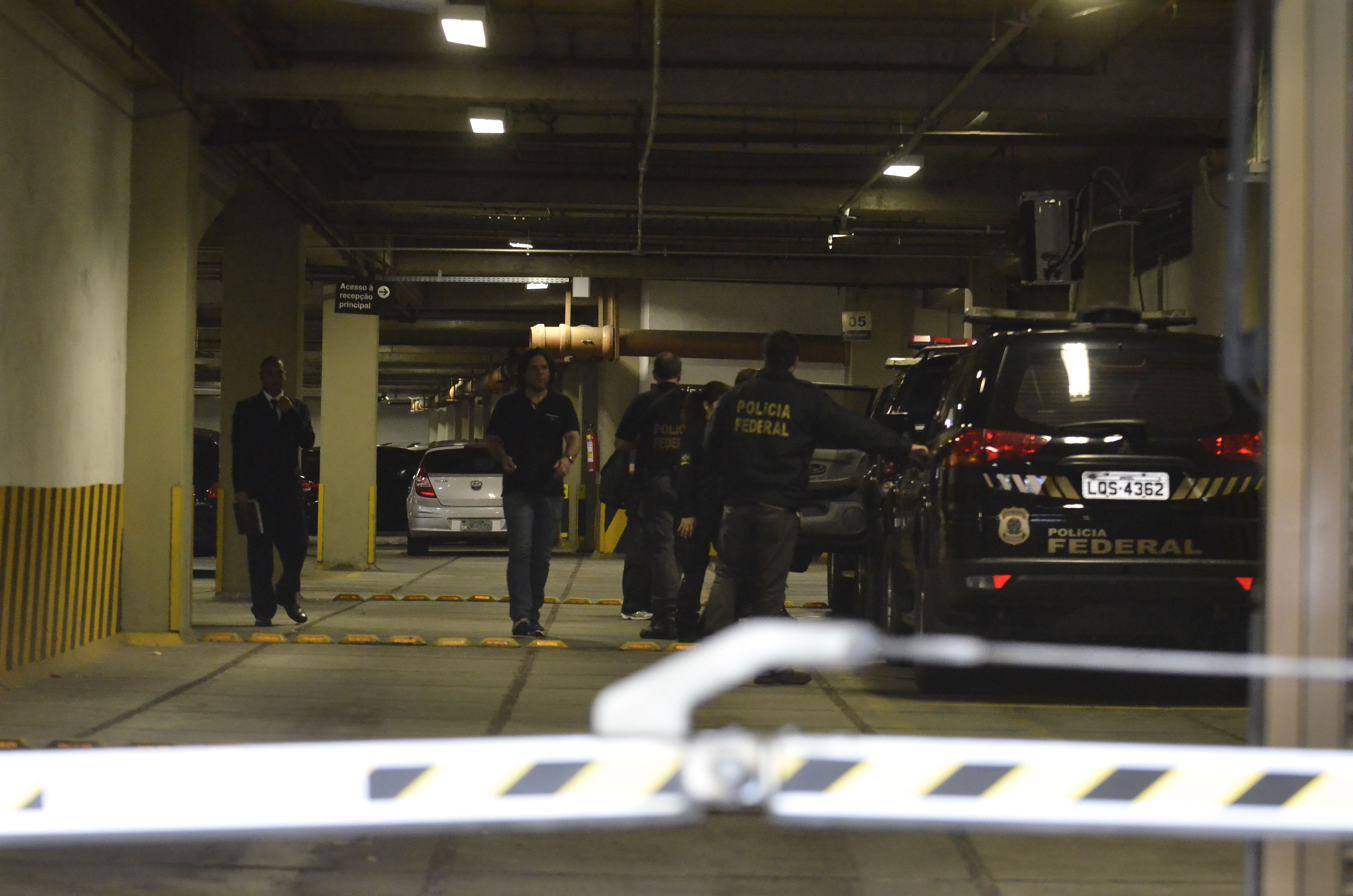

On 19 June 2015, the Federal police launched the 14th phase of Operation Car Wash, code-named "Erga Omnes", a Latin expression meaning "valid for all". The targets were the contractors Odebrecht and Andrade Gutierrez. The two company presidents Marcelo Odebrecht and Otávio Azevedo, were arrested in the operation. Odebrecht directors Marcio Faria, Rogério Araújo and Alexandrino Alencar were also arrested. Thirty-eight search warrants were served, eight were for preventive detention, four were temporary detention, and nine were condução coercitiva warrants. Judicial warrants were served in São Paulo, Rio de Janeiro, Minas Gerais and Rio Grande do Sul.

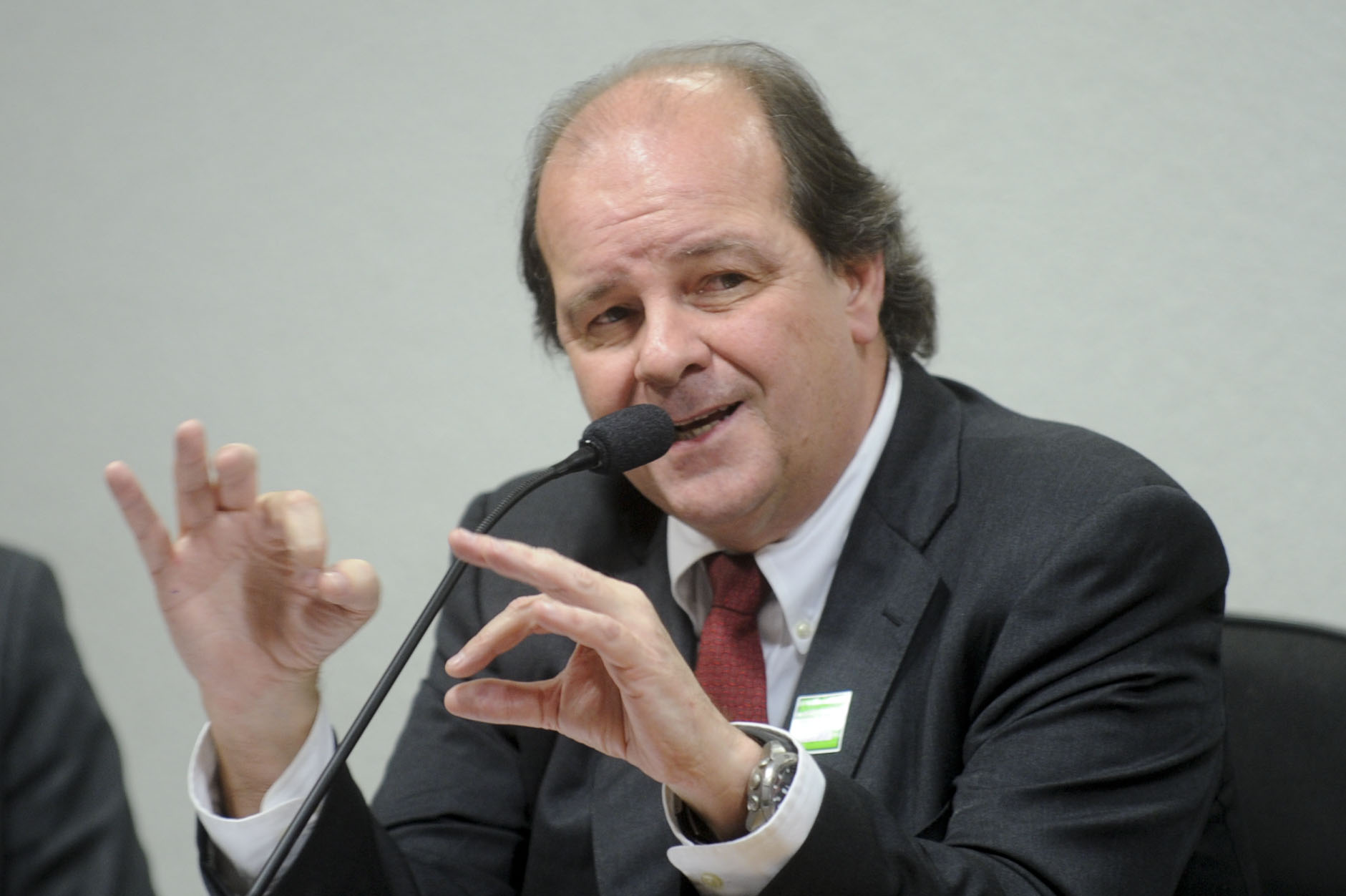
Jorge Zelada was arrested in Operation Monaco.

==== Phase 15 — Operation Monaco Connection ====
On 2 July 2015, the Police launched the 15th phase, code named Monaco Connection (Operação Conexão Mônaco), serving five court orders, four of which were for search and seizure and one for pre-trial detention. Jorge Zelada, former director of the international department of Petrobras, was arrested in the city of Rio de Janeiro and sent to prison in Curitiba, due to kickbacks of more than 10 million euros ($11.2 million) in company business. Zelada had previously been cited by two whistleblowers, Paulo Roberto Costa and Pedro Barusco, as the beneficiary of the corruption scheme. He was the successor of Nestor Cerveró, acting in the international department of Petrobras from 2008 to 2012.

==== Phase 16 — Operation Radioactivity ====
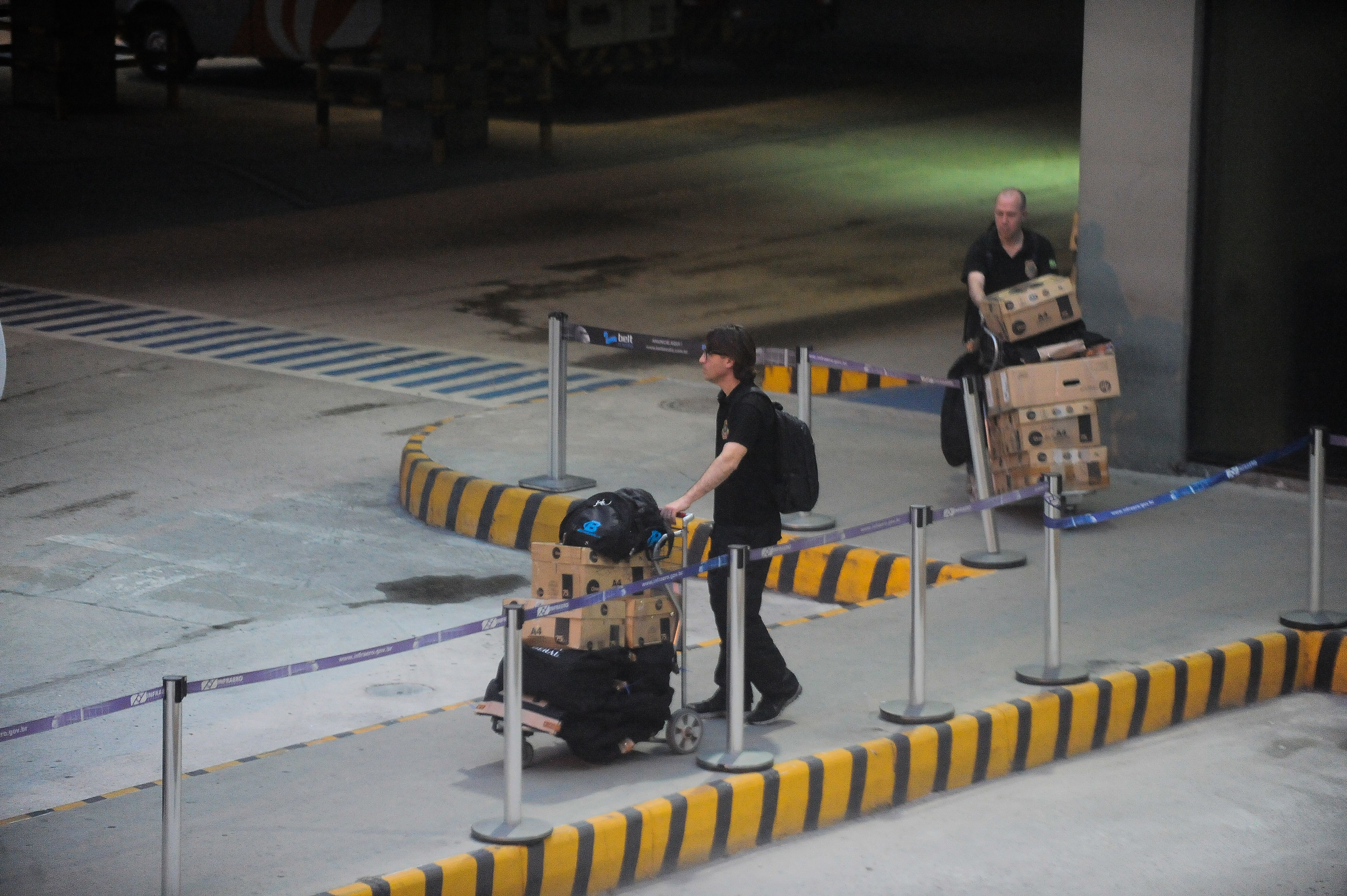
Federal police officers ship material seized at the Eletrobras electric utility, in Operation Radioactivity

The Federal Police on 28 July 2015, the phase launched Operation Radioactivity (Radioatividade) with the arrest of Othon Pinheiro da Silva, former CEO of Eletronuclear, and Flávio David Barra, president of global AG Energy. The two were arrested in Rio de Janeiro and taken to the Federal Police in Curitiba. In addition to bribery the 16th phase investigated the formation of a cartel and previous price-fixing on the Angra 3 construction project. On 28 July 2015, federal judge Sergio Moro, who ran the Lava Jato investigations in Paraná, froze 60 million reais ($15 million), 20 million from former president of Eletronuclear Othon Luiz Pinheiro da Silva, 20 million from Andrade Gutierrez executive Flavio David Barra, and another 20 million from Aratec Engenharia, Consultoria & Representacoes Ltda, which belongs to Othon Luiz.

==== Phase 17 — Operation Pixuleco ====
On 3 August 2015, the Federal Police launched Operation Pixuleco, named after the term that the former treasurer of the Workers' Party, João Vaccari Neto, had used to refer to "bribe". 40 court warrants were carried out: three preventive detention, five temporary pre-trial detention, 26 search and seizure and six condução coercitiva warrants. José Dirceu and his brother Luiz Eduardo de Oliveria e Silva were arrested in the operation for corruption, money laundering and criminal conspiracy. About 200 police officers took part in the operation.

==== Phase 18 — Operation Pixuleco II ====
Operation Pixuleco II was launched on 13 August 2015. In the operation, 70 officers carried out search and seizure warrants, as well as arrest warrants, in Brasília, São Paulo, Porto Alegre and Curitiba. The operation was an offshoot of the previous phase, Pixuleco, which arrested José Dirceu. Former city councilor Alexandre Romano (Worker's Party) was caught in the São Paulo–Congonhas Airport and arrested. Romano was suspected of receiving illicit funds (vantagem indevida (Note: vantagem indevida – literally, "undue advantage". This is the illicit thing of value offered to someone that is at the core of any form of corruption, whether "active" (corrupção ativa) or "passive corruption" (corrupção passiva) involving payment or receipt of some benefit (whether economic or otherwise) or the promise of it, to or from someone in public office, during their term, or outside their term of office if related to their function while in office. Vantagem indevida comes up several times in the Brazilian Penal Code in articles defining different types of corruption, including Corrupção passiva (article §217), Concussão (§316), Corrupção ativa (§333), and others.)) of at least fifty million reals ($13 million). The payments happened via front companies.

==== Phase 19 — Operation Nessun Dorma ====
The Federal Police launched, on 21 September, Operation Nessun Dorma (Italian for "no sleep") with eleven court orders. Engevix executive, José Antunes Sobrinho, had his preventive detention warrant issued, and was arrested in the city of Florianópolis. According to the investigations, a company received about 20 million reais ($5.1 million), between 2007 and 2013, from construction companies already investigated by Lava Jato. The money, investigators claim, was bribery obtained via Petrobras contracts. In addition, Sobrinho paid bribes even when the operation was already in progress. The recipient of the bribes was Othon Luiz Pinheiro da Silva, former director of Eletronuclear, who is currently in a prison in Curitiba. "Financial transactions were made by Sobrinho in January 2015, including, when another Engevix director was already in prison. That shows how much they have no limits in their operations", said Carlos Fernandes Santos Lima, the persecutor of the task-force.

==== Phase 20 — Operation Corrosion ====
On 16 November 2015, the Federal Police launched the 20th phase of Lava Jato, Operation Corrosion (Operação Corrosão), named after the daily struggle to fight corrosion in oil drilling platforms. The objective was to seize documentary evidence of crimes committed at Petrobras, which were revealed by Operation Car Wash. Roberto Gonçalvez, former executive manager of Petrobras, and Nelson Martins Ribeiro, who investigations revealed as the bag man, were arrested.

==== Phase 21 — Operation Free Pass ====
On 24 November 2015, the Federal Police launched a phase code named "Free Pass" (Passe Livre). The investigation was based on an examination of the circumstances in which Petrobras hired a drilling vessel with concrete evidence of fraud in the bidding procedure. In all, 32 judicial warrants were issued, one of which was for preventive detention of cattle rancher José Carlos Bumlai, in addition to 25 search and seizure warrants and six Condução coercitiva warrants. The operation was carried out in São Paulo, Rio de Janeiro, Mato Grosso do Sul and the Federal District. Among the crimes investigated were fraud related to bidding, fraudulent misrepresentation, forgery of documents, active (Note: Corrupção ativa – literally, "active corruption". Active corruption consists in the act of offering any kind of benefit or advantage (economic, or otherwise) to a public official, to cause them to perform an official act, or to prevent or delay them from performing such an act. The crime consists in the intent to offer the unfair advantage, regardless whether it actually occurs. It is governed by article 333 of the Penal Code.) and passive corruption, (Note: Corrupção passiva – literally, "passive corruption". A crime committed by a public official, which consists in soliciting or receiving, for themselves or on behalf of someone else, an undue benefit (vantagem indevida), or a promise of such benefit. The term "passive" doesn't refer to initiation of a corrupt action, but who receives the benefit. For example, if a driver offers a police officer money in order to avoid a ticket, and the officer accepts, the officer has committed passive corruption (and the driver has simultaneously committed active corruption). Even if the officer suggests the bribe, it's still passive.) influence peddling, money laundering, among others.

On 21 March, Bumlai left the prison in Curitiba. His preventive detention was converted to house arrest due to his bladder cancer. Bumlai's lawyers claimed that their client was 71 and had other chronic diseases.

=== 2016 ===
==== Phase 22 — Operation Triple X ====
After the 21st phase, the Federal Police arrested banker André Esteves, once the 13th richest Brazilian, on suspicion of obstructing Lava investigations. On 27 January 2016 the Federal Police launched the Triple X operation (Triplo X) in São Paulo and Santa Catarina. Eighty police officers served six temporary arrest warrants, fifteen search and arrest warrants and two of condução coercitiva. The operation took place in three São Paulo cities -- São Paulo, Santo André and São Bernardo do Campo --- as well as in Joaçaba, Santa Catarina—and investigated criminal networks designed to open offshore companies and accounts abroad to hide and conceal the proceeds of corruption crimes, notably funds from crimes at Petrobras, as well conceal wealth through real estate ventures. Nelci Warken, Ricardo Honório Neto and Renata Pereira Brito were arrested, and warrants issued for Maria Mercedes Riano Quijano, Ademir Auada and Luiz Fernando Hernadez Rivero.

PF suspects that one of the contractors investigated in Operation Lava Jato disguised bribes in the Petrobras criminal scheme. Charges included corruption, fraud, currency evasion and money laundering.

==== Phase 23 — Operation Acarajé ====
Operation Acarajé targeted Labor Party publicist and marketer João Santana and engineer Zwi Skornicki, official representative in Brazil of the Keppel Fels shipyard conglomerate. In testimony given in a plea agreement, former Petrobras manager Pedro Barusco stated that Skornicki continued to pay bribes to Renato Duque even after the former director left Petrobras, US$14 million in all.

Odebrecht was also targeted by the operation. The Federal Public Prosecutor stated that the Odebrecht Group was already under investigation for paying bribes to Renato Duque, Paulo Roberto Costa, Jorge Zelada and Nestor Cerveró, transferred by fraudulent invoices for US$3 million between 13 April 2012 and 8 March 2013, "an amount which indicates that it consisted of a bribe from Petrobras transferred to the marketers for the benefit of PT" .

===== Preventive arrests =====
- Zwi Skornicki
- Fernando Migliaccio da Silva

===== Temporary detentions =====
- Benedito Barbosa
- João Santana
- Monica Moura
- Maria Lúcia Guimarães Tavares
- Vinicius Veiga Borin
- Marcelo Rodrigues

==== Phase 24 — Operation Aletheia ====
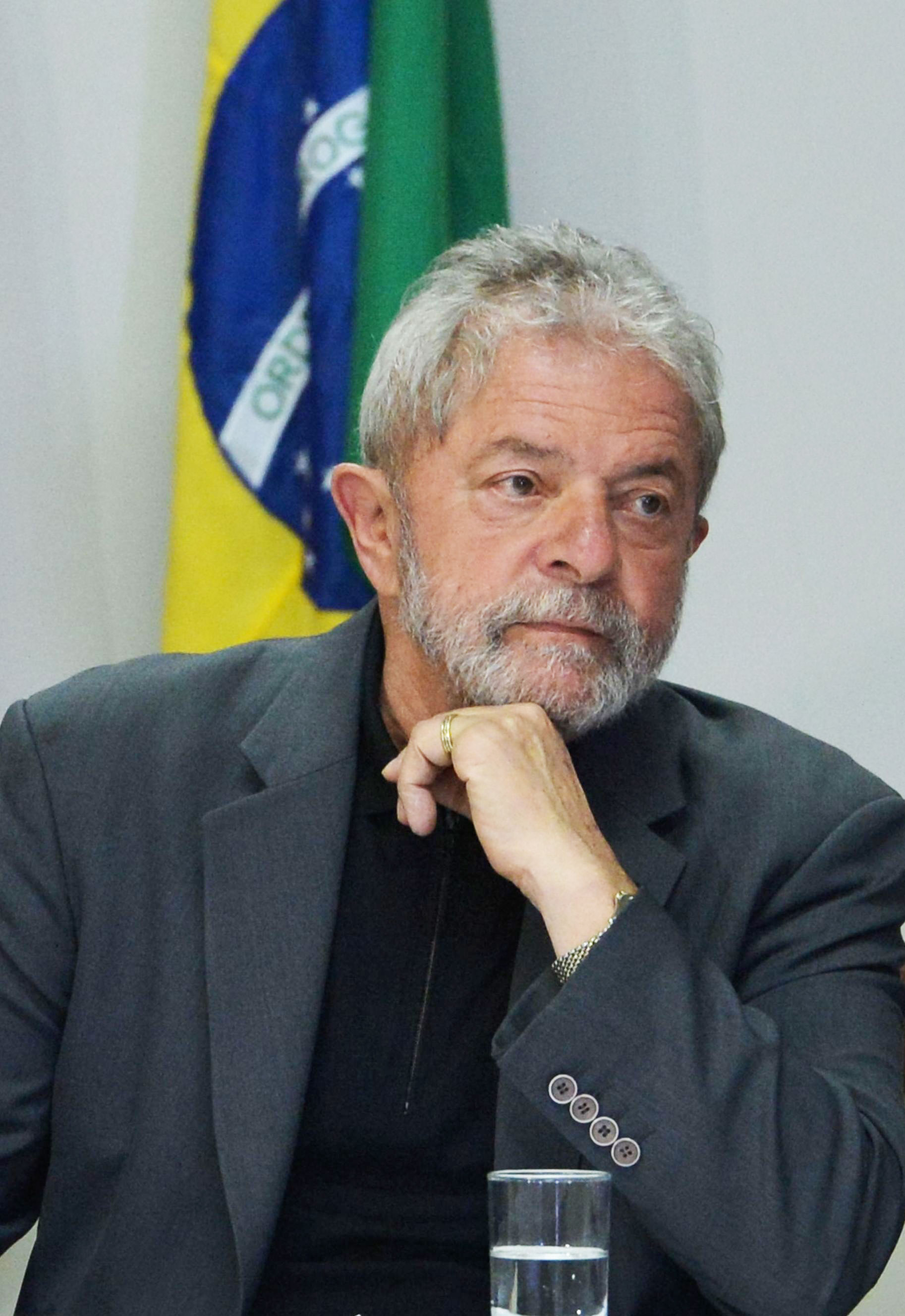
Luiz Inácio Lula da Silva was taken to testify to the Federal Police in the 24th phase

On 4 March 2016 the Federal Police launched Operation Aletheia, serving eleven condução coercitiva warrants and 33 search and seizure warrants. Among those targeted by the operation were former president Luiz Inácio Lula da Silva, his two sons, and Paulo Okamotto, a friend of Lula. The Police also carried out search and seizure warrants in addresses associated with some of Lula's relatives, such as his institute, known as Instituto Lula, presided over by Okamotto, his properties in São Bernardo do Campo, the city where Lula lived, as well as Atibaia (Note: O sítio de Atibaia – (lit., "Atibaia site") is the name given by the press to an estate in Atibaia, a town in the interior of São Paulo state, which was central to the condemnation of President Lula in Operation Car Wash. The owner of the estate was Fernando Bittar, ex-colleague of Fábio Luís Lula da Silva, o Lulinha, son of Lula. The estate was seized by the judge as part of Lula's sentence.) and Guarujá, both located in the state of São Paulo, where Lula and his wife allegedly had a triplex apartment renovated by building contractor OAS. The Police reported that they were investigating crimes of corruption and money laundering. Warrants were also served in Salvador, Rio de Janeiro and in the São Paulo cities of Diadema, Santo André and Manduri. The condução coercitiva of Lula reverberated in the international press.

Lula was taken under the power of a condução coercitiva warrant to the São Paulo–Congonhas Airport to testify. The name of the operation is a Greek word meaning "pursuit of truth".

==== Phase 25 — Operation Polishing in Portugal ====
On 21 March 2016 the Judicial Police of Portugal carried out Operation Polishing in Portugal (Operação Polimento). The financial operator Raul Schmidt Felippe Junior, a fugitive since July 2015, was preventively detained. This was the first international operation carried out by Operation Car Wash. Schmidt had been targeted by the 10th phase of the operation and considered to be associated with Jorge Luiz Zelada, who was arrested in the Médico-Penal Complex, in Pinhais, Paraná. The investigations pointed to Raul being suspected of involvement in bribe payments to Zelada, Renato de Souza Duque, and Nestor Cerveró. According to the Federal Public Ministry, in addition to being the operator, Schmidt also acted as an agent for international companies for obtaining contracts for the exploitation of Petrobras oil platforms. Schmidt had dual nationality, Brazilian and Portuguese, and moved to Portugal soon after Operation Car Wash was launched.

==== Phase 26 — Operation Xepa ====
On 22 March 2016, the 26th phase of Operation Car Wash launched, called Operation Xepa, an offshoot of Operation Acarajé. In Operation Xepa, 67 search and seizure warrants, 28 condução coercitiva warrants, 11 temporary arrest warrants and 4 preventive arrest warrants were executed in the states of São Paulo, Brasília, Santa Catarina, Pernambuco, Minas Gerais, Rio de Janeiro, Rio Grande do Sul, Piauí and Bahia. The Federal Police discovered, through analysis of documents from the Acarajé operation, cash payments to third parties indicated by senior Odebrecht executives, using financial operators in the parallel foreign exchange market to make illegal payments.

==== Phase 27 — Operation Carbon 14 ====
On 1 April, the Federal Police launched Operation Carbon 14 (Operação Carbono 14), with 12 court orders, including two temporary arrests, eight search and seizure warrants in the companies DNP Eventos, Expresso Santo André and Diário do Grande ABC, and two condução coercitiva warrants. The temporary arrest warrants were issued against Ronan Maria Pinto e Silvio Pereira. Former Workers' Party treasurer Delúbio Soares and Breno Altman were the targets of condução coercitiva. The operation investigates crimes such as extortion, fraudulent misrepresentation, fraud, active and passive corruption, and money laundering.

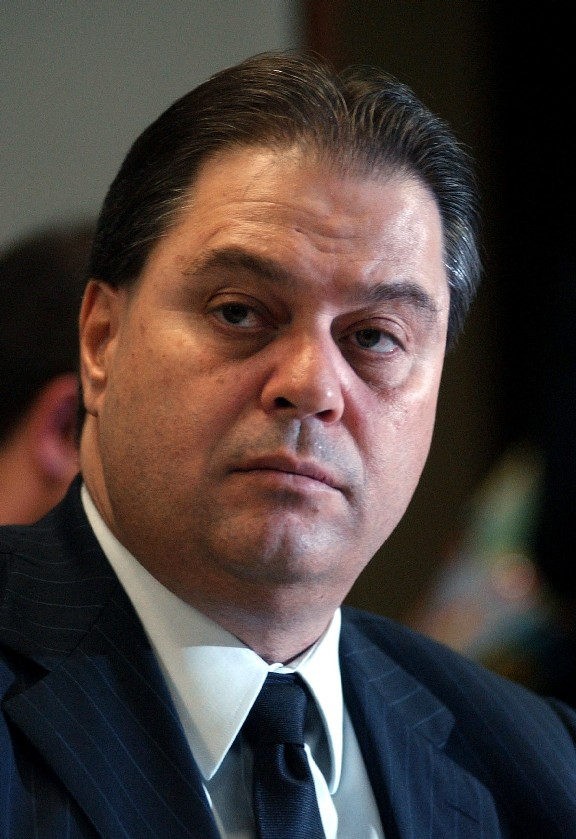
Gim Argello was arrested in Phase 28.

==== Phase 28 — Operation Vitória de Pirro ====
On 12 April 2016, the Federal Police launched Operation Vitoria de Pirro, with the arrest of the former senator Gim Argello, suspected of avoiding crucial testimony at CPI da Petrobras (CPMI) in 2014.

==== Phase 29 — Operation Playoff ====
On 23 May, the Federal Police launched Operation Playoff (Operação Repescagem), which investigated crimes of criminal association, money laundering and passive and active corruption involving embezzled funds associated to the Progressive Party (PP). The party's former treasure, João Cláudio Genu, was arrested in the operation. Six search and seizure, one preventive detention and two temporary arrest warrants were issued in the states of Pernambuco, Rio de Janeiro and the Federal District.

==== Phase 30 — Operation Addiction ====
On 24 May Federal Police launched Operation Addiction (Operação Vício), (Note: The Portuguese code name, Operação Vício ("Operation Addiction"), could also translate as "Operation Vice".) with 39 court orders, which include two arrests, 28 search and seizure warrants and nine condução coercitiva warrants in the states of São Paulo and Rio de Janeiro. The name of the operation has to do with the systematic and repeated practice of corruption perpetrated by certain employees of the state company and politicians who seem to not be able to act in any other way that doesn't harm the State.

==== Phase 31 — Operation Abyss ====
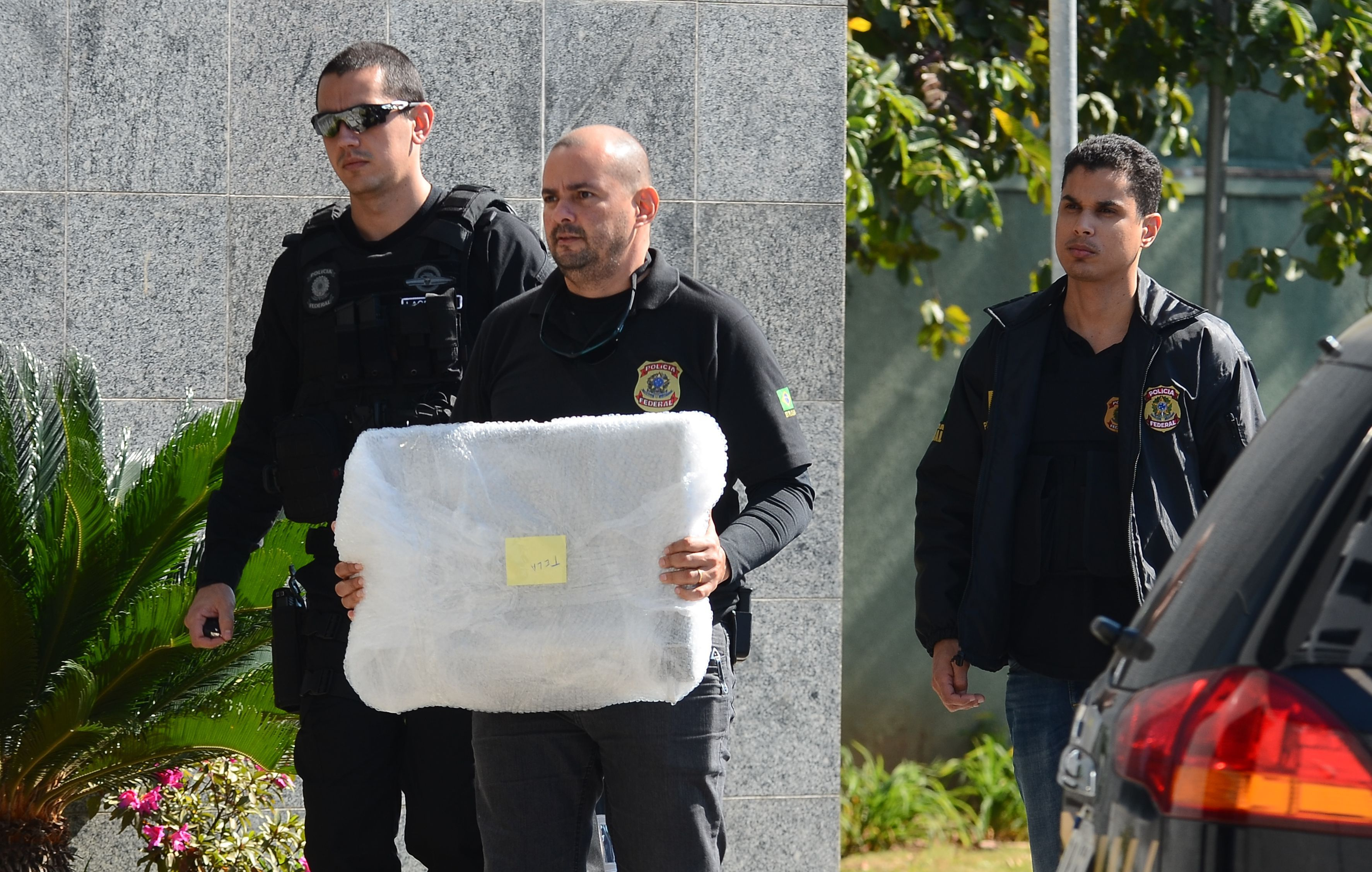

On 4 July 2016, the Federal Police launched Operation Abyss (Operação Abismo) in São Paulo, Rio de Janeiro, and the Federal District. One of the targets was former Workers' Party treasurer Paulo Adalberto Alves Ferreira, arrested on 24 June, when he was the target of Operation Brazil Cost, an offshoot of Operation Car Wash that investigated fraud in Law 10.820 loans (Crédito consignado (Note: Crédito consignado – literally, "consigned credit". Also known as an empréstimo consignado ("consigned loan"), this is a type of fixed, collateral-free loan where the repayments are deducted directly from your payroll check, or retirement or other benefits payment. These can be up to 30% of one's monthly income. The law originally came into effect in 2004 as a result of Law 10.820 (2003). The max repayment term is eight years (for salaried workers) or six years (retired). Some abuses of elderly pensioners has been noted, because the lower-than-market rates have enabled some seniors, especially those in lower income brackets, to gain loans who otherwise could not, but who then run into trouble and default on other repayments leaving them insufficient funds to meet basic needs.)) to civil servants. Ferreira was the target of a preventive detention warrant. (Note: Prisão preventiva – (literally, "preventive detention", but not exact equivalents. Prisão preventiva is a pre-trial, precautionary detention defined by CPP §311–316. The Anglo-Saxon "preventive detention" is broader in scope; the Brazilian one may be more like pre-trial remand.) A further 35 judicial warrants were issued, four of which were for temporary detention, (Note: Prisão temporária – literally, "temporary detention". A type of "temporary pre-trial detention". In Brazil, a 1989 law following the Constitution of Brazil, replacing the former prisão por averiguação (investigative detention) which was found to be contrary to fundamental rights under the 1988 charter. Only used in certain high crimes where it might impede the investigation if the subject were not detained, and where they have no fixed address or their identity cannot be established.) 24 for search and seizure, and seven condução coercitiva warrants.

==== Phase 32 — Operation Ghostbusters ====
On 7 July 2016, the Federal Police launched Operation Ghostbusters (Operação Caça-Fantasmas), which investigated crimes against the national financial system, money laundering and international criminal organizations. About 60 police officers executed 10 search warrants and 7 conduções coercitivas (forced appearance in court to provide clarifications) in three cities: São Paulo, São Bernardo do Campo and Santos. The targets were the Panamanian bank FPB Bank, which operated in Brazil illegally, and the Mossack Fonseca law firm, which specialized in opening and managing offshore bank accounts. Paulo Fanton, FPB Bank's representative in Brazil, faced a search warrant and a condução coercitiva. The bank and the firm had opened and maintained bank accounts in Brazil to enable the flow of undeclared cash abroad.

==== Phase 33 — Operation One Left ====
On 2 August 2016, the Federal Police launched Operation One Left (Operação Resta Um, which investigated the activities of the construction company Queiroz Galvão and its former executives Idelfonso Collares and Othon Zanoide Filho for corruption and fraud in operations of the Petrochemical Complex in Rio de Janeiro, the Abreu e Lima Refinery and several refineries, such as Vale do Paraíba, Landulpho Alves and Duque de Caxias.

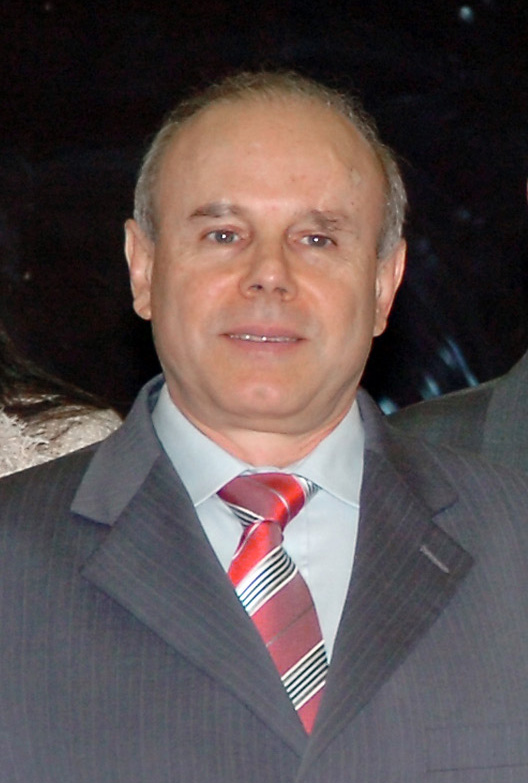
Guido Mantega was a target of Phase 34; he was arrested, but soon released.

==== Phase 34 — Operation X-Files ====
On 22 September 2016, the Federal Police opened Operation X-Files (Operação Arquivo X) in Minas Gerais, Bahia, Rio de Janeiro, Rio Grande do Sul, São Paulo and the capital.

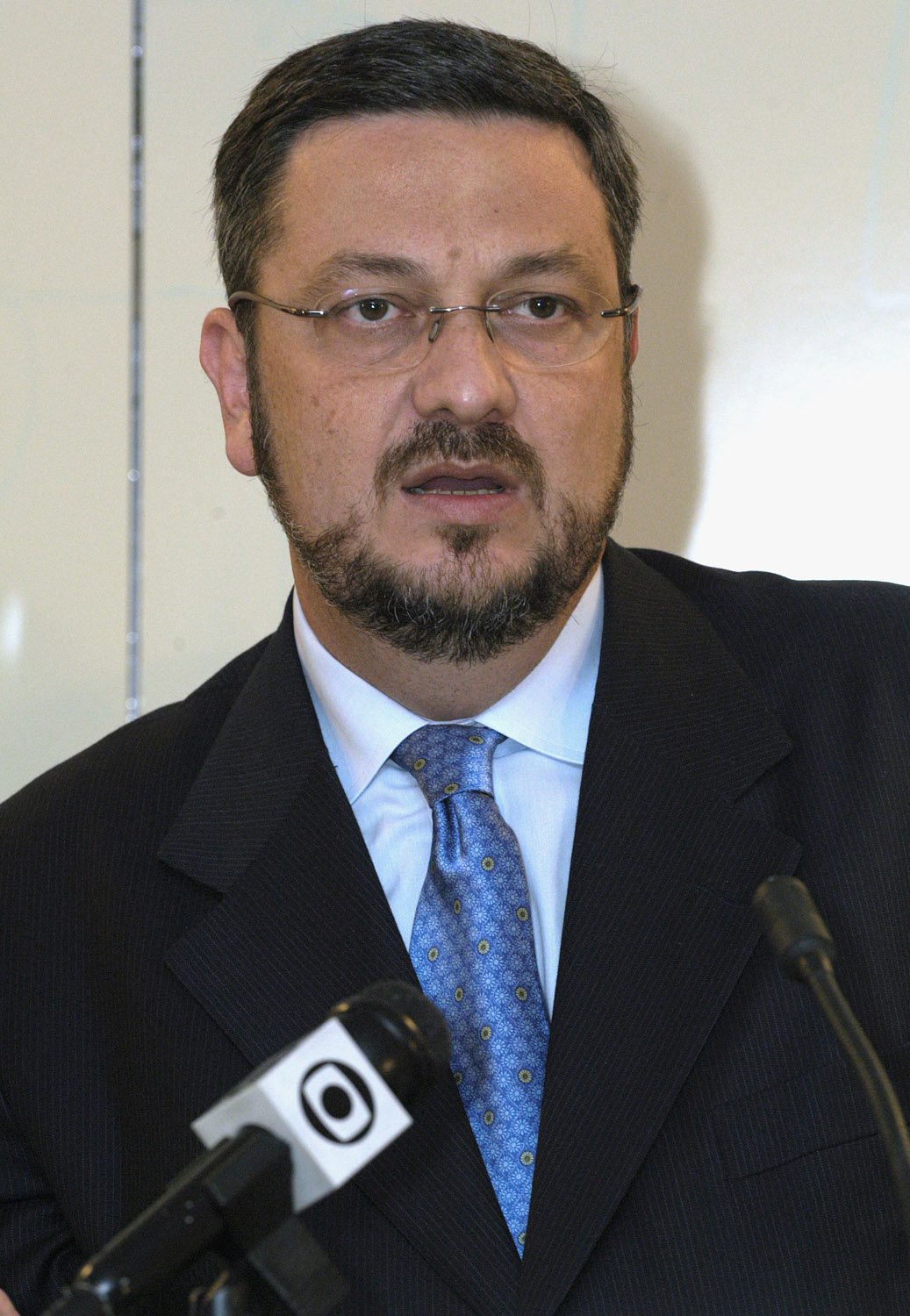
Antonio Palocci, arrested in Phase 35

==== Phase 35 — Operation Omertà ====
On 26 September 2016, the Federal Police launched Operation Omertà, which resulted in the arrest of former Finance Minister and Chief of Staff Antonio Palocci in the São Paulo capital.

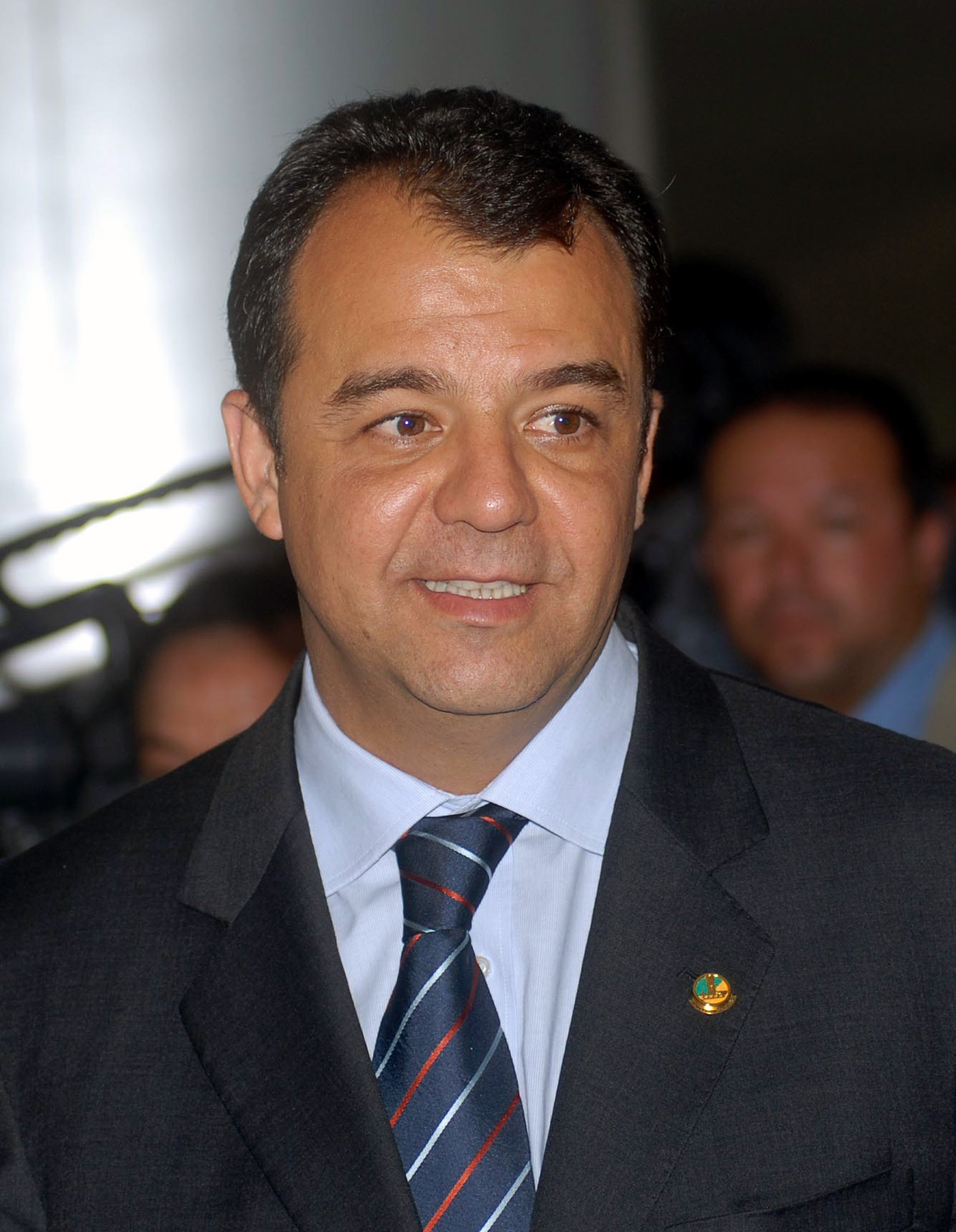
Sérgio Cabral Filho, arrested in Phase 37

==== Phase 36 — Operation Dragon ====
On 10 November, the Federal Police launched Operation Dragon (Operação Dragão), with the preventive detention of Adir Assad and the operator Rodrigo Tacla Duran. Adir had already been arrested in a previous phase of Car Wash. In total, 18 court orders were carried out, including 16 search and seizure warrants and two preventive detention warrants in cities in the states of Paraná, São Paulo, and Ceará. According to the Public Prosecutor's Office (MPF), the investigations brought to light evidence that the operators used sophisticated money-laundering mechanisms, involving bank accounts in the name of offshore companies outside of Brazil, the use of front companies, and the execution of phony contracts. Companies involved in the scheme used the front companies to generate resources for bribery payments, such as UTC Engenharia and Mendes Júnior, to the financial operator.

==== Phase 37 — Operation Calicute ====
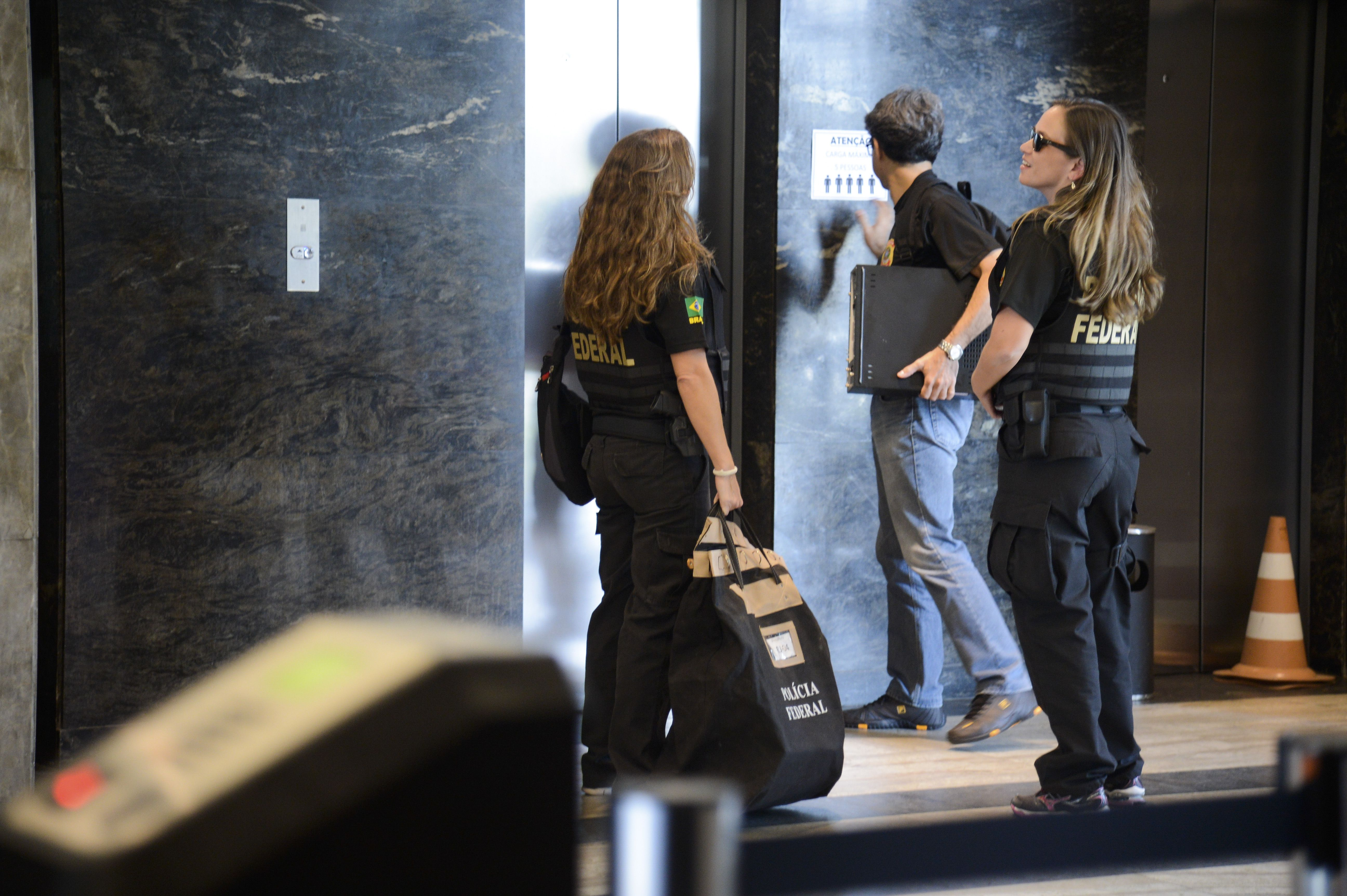

On 17 November 2016, the Federal Police launched Operation Calicute, and arrested former Rio de Janeiro Governor Sérgio Cabral Filho on charges of bribery in government contracts. The lawsuit aimed to investigate the diversion of federal public funds from public works projects works carried out by the state government of Rio de Janeiro, with an estimated loss (at the time) of over R$224 million ($56,800,000) . The investigation stemmed from the depositions of the owner of Delta Engenharia, contractor Fernando Cavendish, and executives from Carioca Engenharia and Andrade Gutierrez, in the investigation called Radioactivity, launched on 28 July 2015, with the arrests of Othon Luiz Pinheiro da Silva, former CEO of Eletronuclear, and Flávio David Barra, president of global AG Energy in Rio de Janeiro. They were then taken to the Federal Police in Curitiba. In addition to bribery, the 16th phase investigated the Angra 3 construction project.

Executives of them government contractors gathered at the Guanabara Palace, official residence of the Rio de Janeiro governor, to discuss the illicit payments, and invoice padding and kickbacks in major public works construction contracts. Only Carioca Engenharia proved the payment of more than R$176 million ($44,600,000) in bribes to the group. In all, the Federal Police served 38 search and seizure warrants, eight for pre-trial detention, two for temporary detention and 14 for condução coercitiva warrants.

=== 2017 ===
==== Phase 38 — Operation Blackout ====
On 23 February 2017, PF launched Operation Blackout, referring to the surname of two of the scheme's financial operators: Jorge Luz and Bruno Luz, (Note: Operation Blackout, referring to the surname...Luz – the father and son's surname, Luz, means "light" in Portuguese; hence the play on words with the term Blackout in the operation codename.) father and son. Both were linked to the PMDB and paid $40 million in bribes over ten years. According to the investigations, among the beneficiaries there were senators and other politicians, as well as Petrobras directors and managers. According to the MPF, the two brokered bribes and bribes involving contracts with the state using accounts in Switzerland and the Bahamas. They were mainly active in the Petrobras International Area, but also started to solicit bribes for the PMDB from the diretoria de Abastecimento, (Note: Diretoria de Abastecimento – (lit. "Directorate of Supply") "Supply Board.") the Progressive Party (PP), and the diretoria de Serviços, and the Workers Party (PT). The warrants filed by the task force were based primarily on testimony from cooperating witnesses, reinforced by documents, as well as evidence raised through international legal cooperation. Fifteen search and seizure warrants were issued.

==== Phase 39 — Operation Parallel ====
On 28 March 2017, the Federal Police launched Operation Parallel (Operação Paralelo), serving warrants in the city of Rio de Janeiro: one of preventive custody and five others for search and seizure.

==== Phase 40 — Operation Asphyxia ====
On 4 May 2017, the Federal Police launched Operation Asphyxia, serving sixteen search and seizure warrants, two preventive custody, two temporary custody and five Condução coercitiva. They arrested four suspects and served warrants in Minas Gerais, Rio de Janeiro and São Paulo.

==== Phase 41 — Operation Dry Well ====
On 26 May 2017, the Federal Police launched Operation Dry Well Operação Poço Seco) targeting the complex financial operations negotiated during Petrobras' acquisition of oil exploration rights in Benin.

==== Phase 42 — Operation Cobra ====
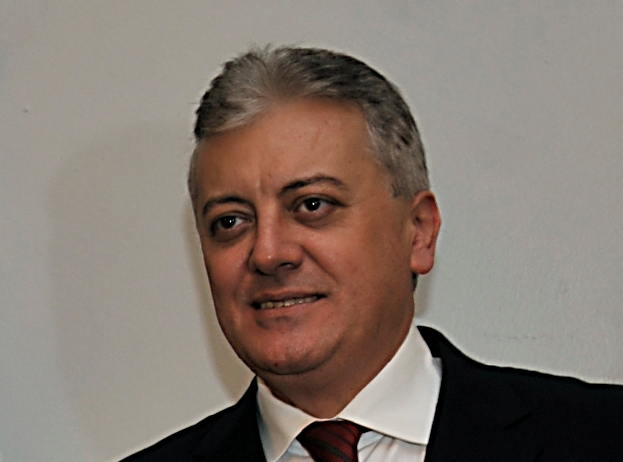
Aldemir Bendine, arrested in Phase 42

On 27 July 2017, the Federal Police launched Operation Cobra (Operação Cobra), arresting the former president of Banco do Brasil and Petrobras Aldemir Bendine.

==== Phase 43 — Operation Without Borders ====
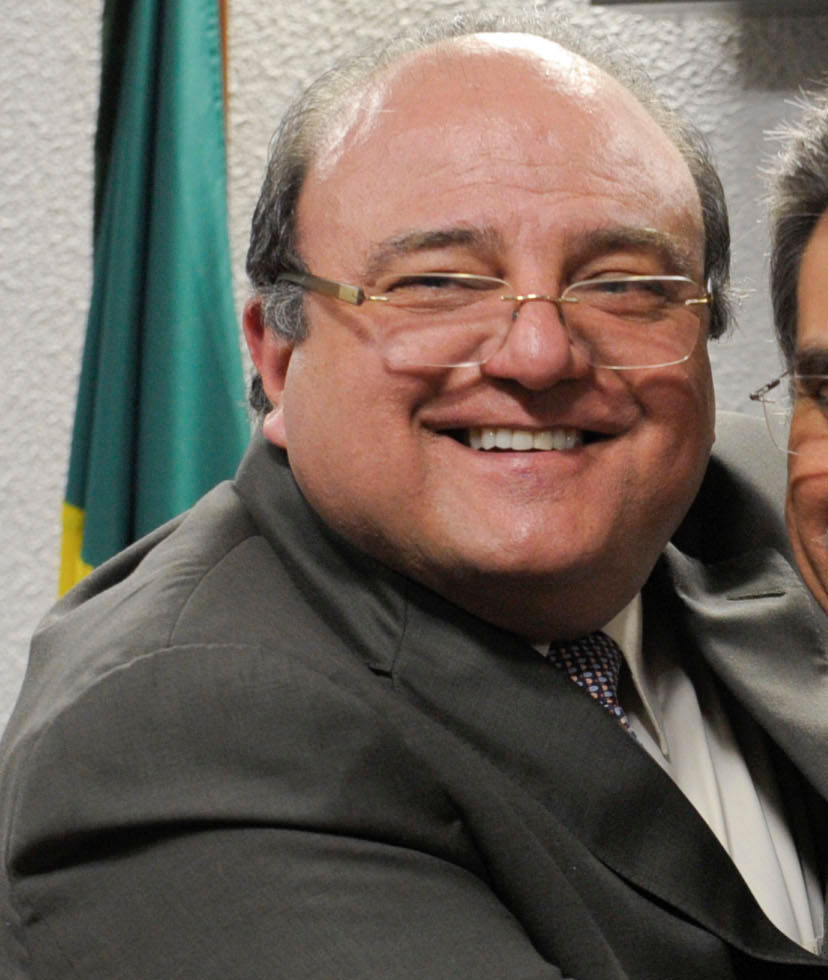
Cândido Vaccarezza, arrested in the 43rd phase

On 18 August 2017, the Federal Police launched two new phases of the operation in Rio de Janeiro and São Paulo, serving 46 judicial orders, including the arrest of the former leader of Lula's government and Dilma Rousseff's government and former federal deputy Cândido Vaccarezza.

==== Phase 44 — Operation Slaughter ====
Operation Slaughter targeted a criminal organization sponsored by a former federal deputy, who used his influence to obtain Petrobras contracts with a foreign company. In this illegal activity, illicit funds were directed to executives of the state oil company, public officials, and politicians, in addition to the former congressman himself, according to the Federal Police.

==== Phase 45 — Operation Slaughter II ====
On 23 August 2017, the Federal Police launched a new phase named Operation Slaughter II (Portuguese: Operação Abate II). Court orders were carried out in the Federal District, and in the states of Bahia and São Paulo, totalizing four search and seizure warrants. The attorney Tiago Cedraz, son of the Federal Court of Accounts minister, Aroldo Cedraz, was one of the targets of the search warrants. According to the investigations, the lobbyist Jorge Luz, arrested in Curitiba, stated that Cedras intermediated talks betweens the north-American company Sargeant Marine and Petrobras, receiving 20 thousand dollars in bribes for the job in bank accounts kept in Switzerland, in the name of offshore companies.

==== Phase 46 — unnamed ====
In October 2017, an unnamed phase was launched with the arrest of Luís Carlos Moreira da Silva, Petrobras' former manager. The investigations indicate illicit payments of 95 million reals ($24,000,000). The phase has two investigation fronts: Petroquisa's projects (petrochemical branch of Petrobras) and contracts involving drillship Vitórioa 10,000.

==== Phase 47 — Operation Sothis ====
On 21 November 2017, Operation Sothis was launched with the arrest of a former manager at Transpetro, a Petrobras subsidiary. Fourteen court orders were issued in the states of Bahia, Sergipe, Santa Catarina and São Paulo. According to the Public Prosecutor's Office (MPF), the former manager, his relatives, and intermediaries are suspected of receiving 7 million reals ($2,000,000) in bribes paid by construction companies between September 2009, and March 2014. The amount, according to the persecutors, was paid in monthly installments for the benefit of the Workers' Party. Eight search and seizure warrants and five condução coercitiva warrants were also served.

The code name "Sothis" is an allusion to the company "Sirius", which is one of the ones that was investigated. The star Sirius was named Sothis by the Egyptians.

=== 2018 ===
==== Phase 48 — Operation Integration ====
On 22 February 2018, a phase 48, Operation Integration (Operação Integração) was initiated, investigating corruption in the concession of federal highways in the state of Paraná, of crimes related to bid rigging and asset laundering.

==== Phase 49 — Operation Buona Fortuna ====
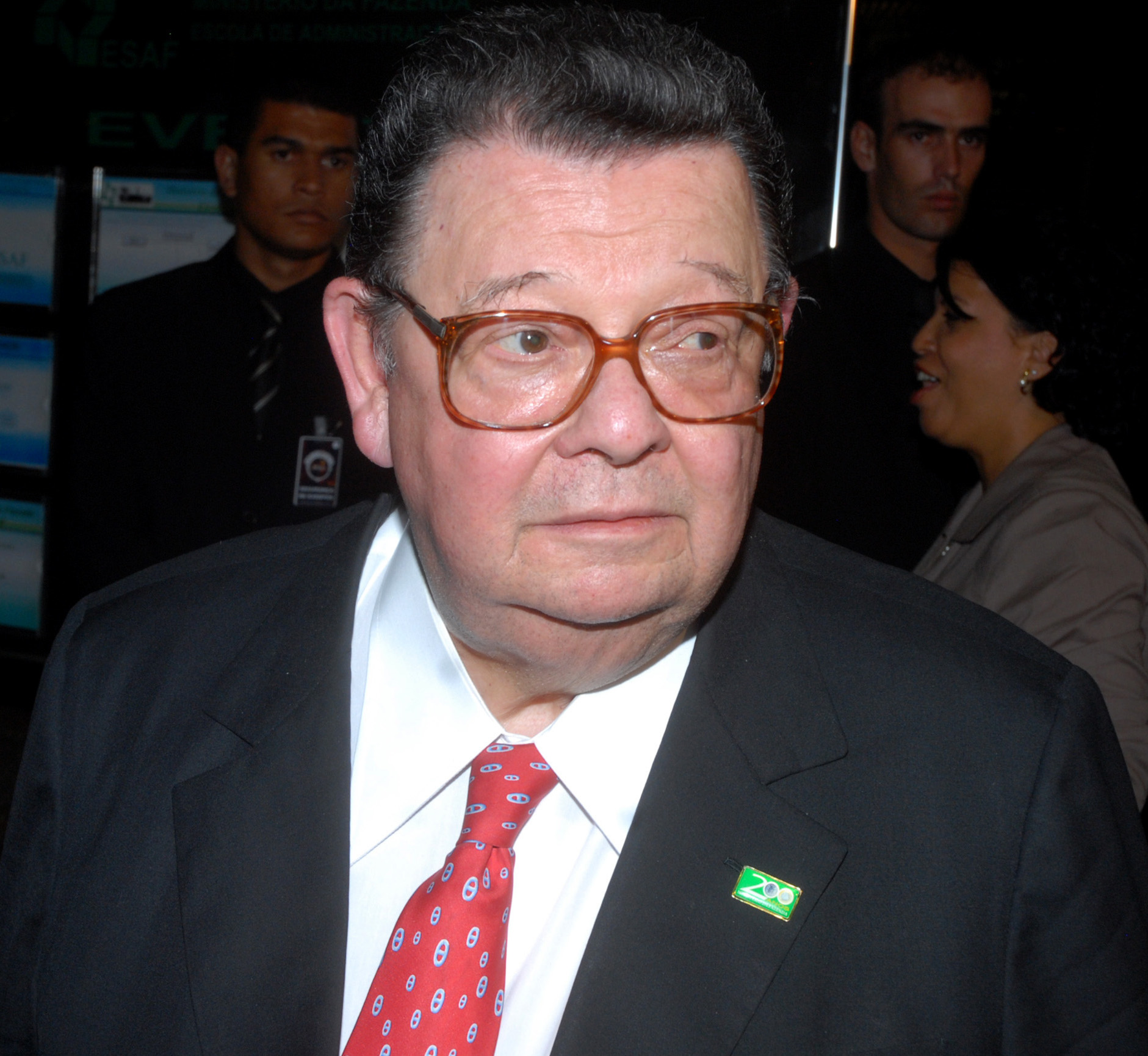
Delfim Netto, target in the 49th phase

On 9 March 2018, police served ten search and seizure warrants in Curitiba, São Paulo, Guarujá and Jundiaí. A kickback was found to favor the consortium that won the bid for the construction of the Belo Monte Plant, in Pará.

==== Phase 50 — Operation Sothis II ====
On 23 March 2018, a new operation called Sothis II served three search and seizure warrants in Salvador, Bahia, and Paulínia. The new phase was a follow-up to phase 47, which investigated corruption and money laundering in Transpetro contracts. One of the targets of the operation was the engineering company Meta Manutenção e Instalações Industriais, suspected of having paid more than 2,325,000 reals ($589,400) in bribes to the former manager of the state company. According to the MPF, the goal of the searches was to collect evidence to help bring the investigations to a conclusion.

==== Phase 51 — Operation Déjà vu ====
On 8 May 2018, the Federal Police (PF) served judicial orders in the states of Rio de Janeiro, Espirito Santo and São Paulo, four of which were preventive custody, two temporary custody and 17 search and seizure.

==== Phase 52 — Operation Greenwich ====
On 21 June 2018, the Federal Police initiated a new operation investigating crimes committed against Petrobras' subsidiaries, such as Petrobras Química S.A. (Petroquisa).

==== Phase 53 — Operation Pilot ====
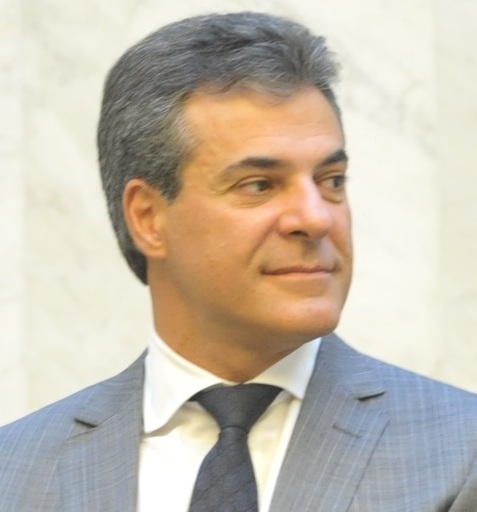
Beto Richa, target in the 53rd phase

On 11 September 2018, the Federal Police launched a new phase, with Beto Richa as the target of search and seizure.

==== Phase 54 — unnamed ====
On 25 September 2018, phase 54 (no code name) of Operation Car Wash was launched in Portugal. According to the Brazilian Public Prosecutor's Office (MPF), five search and seizure warrants were served in Lisbon related to a financial operator that was already the target of Phase 51 (Déjà vu): Mário Ildeu de Miranda. The purpose of the searches was to seize documents and electronic devices hidden in Portugal that could identify evidence of other crimes not yet reported. The Federal Police said that material seized would be shared with Brazil for the ongoing investigations. The Portuguese Public Prosecutor's Office was given judicial authorization to serve the search and seizure warrants thanks to an international cooperation agreement with the Brazilian Public Prosecutor's Office. It was the second phase of Operation Car Wash to be carried out abroad.

==== Phase 56 — Operation Overdraft ====
According to the Federal Police, the 56th phase, dubbed Operation Overdraft (Sem Fundos), found overbilling in the construction of Petrobras' headquarters in Salvador, Bahia. Police officers served 68 search and seizure, 14 temporary detention, and eight pre-trial detention warrants. Judicial mandates were served in São Paulo, Minas Gerais, Rio de Janeiro and Bahia. This was the first stage of investigations authorized by Sergio Moro's substitute judge, Gabriela Hardt. The crimes involved active and passive corruption, fraudulent pension fund management, money laundering, and organized crime. OAS Group and Odebrecht built Petrobras' headquarters in Salvador, the Pituba Tower, and made illicit payouts of at least R$68,295,866 ($17,300,000), almost 10% of the value of the work, according to the MPF. Amounts were later transferred as illicit payments to Petrobras' public employees, the Brazilian Workers Party, and Petros' managers. The scheme of fraudulent hiring and payment of illicit funds occurred between 2009 and 2016.

==== Phase 57 — Operation No Limits ====
On 5 December 2018 Federal Police launched phase 57 of Operation Car Wash, code named Operation No Limits (Sem Limites), to investigate business activity in Petrobras' trading sector activities. (Note: trading sector – from Trading company; spelled this way in Portuguese, this loanword from English is used in Brazil to mean a company that specializes in import-export activities and acts as an intermediary between buyers and vendors in different countries. A Brazilian Trading company operates under Brazilian law and is not quite the same as a "Trading company" in common law countries.) In the states of Paraná and Rio de Janeiro, 190 police officers served 37 court orders (search and seizure warrants, preventive custody, and subpoenas for depositions). Orders were also issued for seizure of real estate, freezing of bank accounts of those under investigation, and blockage of funds up to the limit of the losses identified to that point. The investigation uncovered a scheme at the Petrobras trading division involving the purchase and sale of petroleum and petroleum derivatives between the state-owned company and foreign companies. The scheme was characterized as "organized and active". There were indications of irregularities in the lease of storage tanks to or by Petrobras and the same companies under investigation. The "trading division" activities (purchase and sale) of fuel oil and derivatives at Petrobras were under the supervision of the Supply Directorate. Such operations did not require prior authorization from the directorate, a circumstance that made it much easier to utterly crush the illicit schemes in the hands of several lower-ranking employees linked to the directorate and who performed their functions both in Brazil and in the company's offices abroad. Those under investigation were allegedly responsible for the practice, among other things, of corruption, criminal conspiracy, financial crimes and money laundering.

=== 2019 ===
==== Phase 58 — unnamed ====
On 25 Jan., the Federal Public Ministry requested a warrant of preventive custody, search and seizure against the former governor of Paraná Beto Richa and his accountant Dirceu Pupo Ferreira which was granted by the 23rd Federal Court of Curitiba, and served by the Federal Police. Toll road concessionaires and other companies allegedly bribed the former governor with a R$2.7 million ($680,000) payoff, laundered by the company on behalf of his wife and children, but which he controlled, partly directly and partly by his accountant. Attempted obstruction of the investigations led to the request for the arrest warrant.

==== Phase 59 — Operation Fifth Year ====
On 31 January, a bribe was discovered at Transpetro, with sixty federal police officers and sixteen federal tax auditors serving fifteen search and seizure warrants, three temporary arrests in São Paulo and Araçatuba. The Supreme Federal Tribunal approved Colaboração premiada agreements (Note: Colaboração premiada – literally, "rewarded collaboration"; the common name for the legal process known as delação premiada in Brazil; which is a type of plea bargain involving informing or collaborating with investigations in return for specific reductions in sentence prescribed by the law.) which indicated that from 2008 to 14 companies systematically paid a percentage of up to 3% of 36 contracts with the state-owned company totaling 682 million reals ($173 million), to politicians and to the whistleblower through a law firm, constituting passive and active corruption, money laundering, and criminal conspiracy.

==== Phase 60 — Operation Ad Infinitum ====
On 19 February 2019 twelve search and seizure warrants and one preventive detention order were served in the cities of São Paulo, São José do Rio Preto, Guarujá and Ubatuba in the 60th phase of Operation Car Wash, code named Ad Infinitum. The operation investigated money laundering, including Odebrecht's payment of a bribe to former senator Aloysio Nunes. Paulo Vieira de Souza, also known as Paulo Preto, was identified as a key figure and arrested. According to the Federal police, Odebrecht used the money to help fund election campaigns and to pay kickbacks to public officials and political actors in Brazil. In 2010 and 2011, one of the suspects under investigation held about R$100 million in cash ($25,000,000) on Brazilian soil and managed to pass it on to the Structured Operations Division (Note: Setor propina lit. "bribery sector", or "bribery department" – This is a nickname or slang term given by the media to Odebrecht S.A.'s Structured Operations Division (Setor de Operações Estruturais), because it was that department within the company that was responsible for managing and paying kickbacks and bribes. There isn't sufficient usage in English sources to have settled on one term for it, but "bribery department" is present in a BBC report.) of the company. With this, it was possible to gather funds for campaign financing and for payment of kickbacks to public officials.

==== Phase 61 — Operation Mammon's Disguises ====
On 8 May 2019 three preventive custody warrants were served on three executives of Banco Paulista (Paulo Cesar Haenel Pereira Barreto, Tarcísio Rodrigues Joaquim, and Gerson Luiz Mendes de Brito) and 41 search and seizure warrants were served at the headquarters of companies that traded with Banco Paulista in money laundering operations related to members of the Odebrecht S.A.'s "Structured Operations Division" . The investigations revealed that an amount of at least 48 million reals ($12 million) was laundered abroad by the contractor and transferred to six executives of the Division between 2009 and 2015 through fraudulent misrepresentation (Falsidade ideológica (Note: Falsidade ideológica – a type of fraud involving inclusion of false information in an otherwise valid document. Example: a doctor signs a certificate excusing someone from work who was not sick. The signature is real, the information in the document is false.)) in contracts with the bank in Brazil. Other suspicious transfers to apparently unstructured companies, on the order of 280 million reals ($71 million), were also a subject of the investigation.

==== Phase 62 — Operation Rock city ====
On 31 July, five preventive custody and 33 search and seizure warrants were served in fifteen cities in five states, related to the Grupo Petrópolis's operation of a bribery system in favor of Odebrecht, moving almost half a billion reals ($130 million). The investigations of Operation Car Wash involving the Petropolis Group date back to 2016, when a spreadsheet with then names of politicians and a reference to Itaipava beer was found in the house of the construction company's executive Benedicto Junior. According to the documents, 255 donations were made in the 2010 and 2012 campaigns alone, totaling over R$68 million ($17 million USD).

==== Phase 63 — Operation Carbonara Chimica ====
On 21 Aug., two arrest warrants were served in two states in connection with the bribery of two former ministers by two companies. According to the MPF, the operation sought to identify final beneficiaries of 118 million reals ($30 million) paid by the company through Odebrecht's "bribery department" (Setor de Propina) between 2005 and 2013. The operation also examined the payment of bribes to former ministers Antônio Palocci and Guido Mantega. In addition, four encryption keys were seized that could give access to system folders of the Odebrecht kickback system with contents unknown to the Federal Police. The name of the operation was based on the Odebrecht nicknames "Italian" and "Post-Italian" for two of the ex-ministers who were targets of the operation.

==== Phase 64 — Operation Pentiti ====
On 23 August twelve arrest warrants and search and seizure warrants were served in São Paulo and Rio de Janeiro, focusing on BTG Pactual and Petrobras. The investigation was based on the delação premiada (Note: Delação premiada – "rewarded whistleblowing" (or, "informing"). A legal process by which a suspect is offered a specific reduced sentence prescribed by law, in return for turning in accomplices, or aiding in investigations. The common name for it in Brazil is Colaboração premiada ("rewarded collaboration"). The concept is similar to a plea bargain, in return for investigative assistance.) (plea-bargained investigative cooperation) of former minister Antonio Palocci. Besides the identification of beneficiaries of the so-called "Italian Special Program" and the method of delivering illegal funds to authorities, the phase also clarified the existence of corruption involving federal and state-owned oil finance institutions in exploration of the Brazilian pre-salt layer and in a project to divest assets on the African continent.

==== Phase 65 — Operation Gallery ====
On 10 September, search and seizure warrants were served in Rio de Janeiro. The investigation targeted corruption and money laundering at Transpetro and Belo Monte Dam, with bribery payments of 50 million reals ($13 million) from Estre and Odebrecht S.A. to Edison Lobão and Márcio Lobão and money laundering continuing to 2019. Profits were allegedly involved in forty contracts, worth a total of one billion reals ($250 million), with Estre, Polidutos, NM dutos (Note: Consórcio Nm Dutos Osbra – a Brazilian construction and engineering firm.) and Estaleiro Tietê (Tietê River Shipyards). Márcio Lobão allegedly earned more than R$30 million ($7.6 million), involving art galleries, offshore companies, and financiers.

==== Phase 66 — Operation Minimum Alert ====
On 27 September, investigations discovered money laundering by money exchangers (doleiros (Note: Doleiro – A black-market money dealer; literally, "dollar-er" ("dollar-dealer"). Someone who buys and sells dollars on the gray market. They also transfer funds between countries on behalf of companies or individuals not authorized by the Central Bank of Brazil to perform exchange operations, or which are outside the official mechanisms of registration and control. While this may be legal in some contexts, in others it is an indicator of possible money laundering or tax evasion activities. In this context, a doleiro is someone who converts currencies without authorization, or beyond the limits allowed by law. See also: Dólar-cabo.)) and employees of Banco do Brasil. Seven search and seizure warrants were served in São Paulo, and one in Natal. Federal police officers served court orders at the homes of employees of financial institutions, and at a currency exchange. According to the MPF, this Car Wash phase investigated three managers and one former manager of Banco do Brasil, who facilitated money laundering operations between 2011 and 2014. Transfers exceeded 200 million reals ($51 million). According to the police, the suspects acted on behalf of companies that contracted with Petrobras and needed cash to pay illicit funds (vantagem indevida) to public agents.

==== Phase 67 — Operation Tango & Cash ====
On 23 October, the Federal Police launched a new phase against the Italian-Argentinian Techint group and its Brazilian subsidiaries for fraud against Petrobras' bids, serving 23 search and seizure warrants in three states (São Paulo, Rio de Janeiro and Paraná) and decreeing the blocking of 1.7 billion reals in financial assets belonging to the suspects. The group is accused of being part of a cartel of nine companies, called "O Clube" ("The Club"), suspected of defrauding bids for major constructions by the state-owned company. The other suspected companies are Odebrecht, Camargo Correa, UTC, Andrade Gutierrez, Mendes Júnior, Setal-SOG, Promon and MPE. Former employees of the state-owned company who received kickbacks were also investigated for corruption and the company's intermediaries were investigated for money laundering, including two consulting companies. The federal police suspect that the company paid 2% of the value of each contract signed with the oil company in kickbacks, generating R$60 million ($15 million) in improper payments. To make the illicit payments appear lawful, Techint is suspected of passing on amounts via offshore companies to former directors and managers of Petrobras through fraudulent consulting contracts.

==== Phase 68 — Operation Appium ====
On 7 November, a bribe was discovered to cover up Operation Sand Castle Antônio Palocci accused an ex-president of the Supreme Federal Court of accepting $R 5 million ($1.3 million) from Camargo Correia.

==== Phase 69 — Operation Mine Map ====
On 10 December, the Federal Police and Public Prosecutor's Office launched a new operation that investigated payments of R$132 million ($33.5 million) from Oi telecommunications company to companies belonging to the son of former president Lula da Silva. According to the findings, a portion of these funds may have been used to purchase the Atibaia site, pivotal to one of the two convictions already imposed on the former president in Operation Car Wash. The new phase served 47 search and seizure warrants in São Paulo, Rio de Janeiro, Bahia and the Federal District. It was an offshoot of Phase 24, which took depositions from former President Lula. It involved investigations of crimes of active and passive corruption, criminal conspiracy, international influence peddling, and money laundering. According to the Federal Prosecutor's Office, such payments were made without any plausible economic justification while the Oi/Telemar group benefited from several acts performed by the Federal Government.

==== Phase 70 — Operation Óbolo ====
On 18 December, the Federal Police launched a new phase to serve twelve search and seizure warrants. The operation investigated suspicions that three companies had obtained privileged information and had benefited from at least 200 ship chartering contracts signed by Petrobras totaling more than 6 billion reals ($1.5 billion). Warrants were sent to São Paulo, Rio de Janeiro and Niterói. According to the police, this new stage is a continuation of investigations dating back to the beginning of Operation Car Wash in 2014, and included investigation of corruption of public officials, criminal organization and money laundering. The irregularities are the responsibility of the Procurement Directorate (Diretoria de Abastecimento).

=== 2020 ===
==== Phase 71 — Operation No Limits II ====
Operation No Limits II was launched 18 June 2020, as a spinoff of phase 57. It involved the investigation of the payment of bribes to Petrobras employees by companies that deal in the purchase and sale of oil and oil derivatives.

==== Phase 72 — Operation To sail is necessary ====
On 19 August 2020, the 72nd phase was launched, code-named "To sail is necessary", (Note: To sail is necessary – from the quotation by Pompey: To sail is necessary; to live is not.) which resulted in the imprisonment of the entrepreneur brothers Germán and José Efromovich.

==== Phase 73 — Operation Shoulder to Shoulder ====
On 25 August 2020, the Federal Police, in cooperation with the MPF, launched phase 73 – Operation Shoulder to Shoulder involving bribes to Petrobrás' in the amount of 4 million reals ($1.01 million) to cover up corruption in the bidding process at Petrobras.

==== Phase 74 — Operation Sovrapprezzo ====
On 10 September 2020, Operation Sovrapprezzo (Italian for "Surcharge") was launched in the states of São Paulo and Rio de Janeiro involving fraud by overcharges to Petrobras by employees of Banco Paulista and kickbacks in the amount of 100 million reals ($25.4 million).

Federal Police issues 25 search warrants for foreign exchange transactions at Petrobras between 2008 and 2011. Petrobras said it was the victim, and that they were actively cooperating and provided the information to prosecutors that led to the warrants being issued. Also involved was Banco Paulista's forex transactions during the same period. Officials there said their forex division was "extinct" and that nobody there now knew the objective of the current investigation. The investigation found that Banco Paulista had handled 7.7 billion reals ($1.45 billion) worth of transactions during the 2008-2011 period.

==== Phase 75 — BOEMAN ====
Operation BOEMAN was launched 23 September 2020.

==== Phase 76 — Operation No Limits III ====
Operation No Limits III was launched by the Federal Police on 7 October 2020.

==== Phase 77 — Operation No Limits IV ====
Operation No Limits IV was launched by the Federal Police on 20 October 2020.

==== Phase 78 — Operation No Limits V ====
Operation No Limits V was launched by the Federal Police on 26 November 2020.

=== 2021 ===
==== Phase 79 — Operation Vernissage ====
Operation Vernissage was launched by the Federal Police on 12 January 2021.

==== Phase 80 — Operation Pseudea ====
Operation Pseudea was launched by the Federal Police on 11 February 2021.

== Abroad ==
- 11 December 2016: Due to allegations against Brazilian companies involved in Operation Lava Jato, the National Bank for Economic and Social Development (BNDES) suspended funding of $3.6 billion for 16 construction projects in Latin America. These projects were in the hands of construction companies Odebrecht, Andrade Gutiérrez, Camargo Corrêa, Queiroz Galvão and OAS. The five contractors were investigated for bribing politicians in exchange for contracts and other favors. These projects total US$5.7 billion, 58 percent of the BNDES budget for engineering services in the region between 2003 and 2015. In total, the development bank's loan portfolio abroad has 47 projects worth US$13.5 billion, mostly in Latin America.

== See also ==
- Brazilian currency
- Cabinet of Brazil
- Chamber of Deputies
- Corruption in Brazil
- Crime in Brazil
- Economy of Brazil
- Electricity sector in Brazil
- Federal government of Brazil
- Industry in Brazil
- J&F Investimentos
- JBS S.A.
- Joesley Batista
- Judiciary of Brazil
- Law enforcement in Brazil
- Law of Brazil
- List of companies of Brazil
- List of scandals in Brazil
- Mining in Brazil
- Odebrecht–Car Wash leniency agreement
- Penal Code of Brazil
- Politics of Brazil
- President of Brazil
- President of Brazil
- States of Brazil
- States of Brazil
- Timeline of Brazilian history
