= Candidus =

Candidus may refer to:

== People ==
- Tiberius Claudius Candidus, Roman general who fought against Emperor Pescennius Niger in 193
- Candidus (theologian) (fl. 196), Christian writer
- Saint Candidus (died c.287), Egyptian commander of the Theban Legion
- Cyrion and Candidus (died 320), ethnic Armenian saints
- Candidus Isaurus, historian of the 5th century whose work is in the Patrologia Graeca
- Saint Candidus of Foligno, bishop of the Roman Catholic Diocese of Foligno, 590–602
- Candidus of Fulda, ninth-century Benedictine scholar of the Carolingian Renaissance
- Candidus (floruit 793–802), Anglo-Saxon named Wizo, scholar for Alcuin of York in Gaul
- Candidus, a disciple of Clement of Ireland (c.750–818), teacher and saint
- Hugh of Remiremont, called Candidus (c. 1020–c. 1099), French Benedictine cardinal
- Hugh Candidus (c. 1095–c. 1160), Benedictine historian of Peterborough Abbey, England
- Pantaleon Candidus (1540–1608), Austrian theologian and author
- Daniel Candidus (1568–1637), German Lutheran theologian and writer
- Candidus, a pen name of American statesman Samuel Adams (1722–1803)
- William Candidus (1840–1910), American opera singer

== Other ==
- Candidus (Celtic spirit), a "candid spirit" in Lusitanian and Celtic polytheism (Gaul).
- Candidus (cognomen), a third name of a citizen of ancient Rome
- Candidus, charismatic character heard on BBC's Radio Londra in Italy during World War II
- Saint Candidus (Ayne Bru), a painting by Ayne Bru, created 1502–1507

== See also ==
- Alfred I, Prince of Windisch-Grätz (Alfred Candidus Ferdinand)
- Candidiasis, a fungal infection
- George Candidius, (1597–1647), Dutch missionary to Dutch Formosa
- Candida (disambiguation)
- Candide (disambiguation)
- Candido (disambiguation)
