= Candida =

Candida, or Cándida (Spanish), may refer to:

== Biology and medicine ==
- Candida (fungus), a genus of yeasts
- Any of several yeasts that were formerly classified in genus Candida but are now classified in genus Candidozyma
- Candidiasis, an infection by various yeast species that are or formerly were classified in genus Candida
- Malvasia Candida, a variety of grape

== Places ==
- Candida, Campania, a comune in Avellino, Italy
- Candida Casa, a church in Whithorn, Dumfries and Galloway, Scotland
- Aguas Cándidas, a municipality in Burgos, Castile and León, Spain

== People ==
- Candida (given name)
- Aldoino Filangieri di Candida (died 1283), nobleman in the Kingdom of Naples
- Saint Candida (disambiguation), several people
- Candida, pen name of Eibhlín Ní Bhriain (1925–1986)
- Renato Candida (1916–1988), Italian Carabiniere and writer

== Theatre, film and performing arts ==
- Candida (play), by George Bernard Shaw
  - Candida (1961 TV play), a BBC adaptation
  - Candida (The General Motors Hour), a 1962 Australian television adaptation
- Cándida (1939 film), an Argentine musical film drama directed by Luis Bayon Herrera
- Cándida (2006 film), a Spanish comedy by Javier Fesser
- "Candida Esperanzada", an episode of the Mexican series Mujeres Asesinas
- Candida, a character on the television series Phil of the Future

== Music ==
- Candida (album), by Dawn 1970
  - "Candida" (song), its title track
- "Candida", a song by Ultra Vivid Scene from their 1992 album Rev

== Other ==
- Candida (typeface)
- SS Empire Candida, a cargo ship

== See also ==
- Candide (disambiguation)
- Candido (disambiguation)
- Candidus (disambiguation)
