= Candide (disambiguation) =

Candide is a French satire by the Enlightenment philosopher Voltaire.

Candide may also refer to:

- Candide (operetta), by Leonard Bernstein
- Candide (newspaper), any of three French newspapers

== People ==
- Candide Charkviani (1907–1994), Soviet Georgian politician
- Candide Rochefort (1904–1971), Quebec politician
- Candide Thovex (born 1982), French professional skier

== See also ==
- Candide, Part II, an apocryphal picaresque novel
- Candid (disambiguation)
- Candida (disambiguation)
- Candido (disambiguation)
- Candidus (disambiguation)
