= Candida (given name) =

Candida, Cândida or Cándida is a feminine given name from Latin candidus (white). Notable people with the name include:

- Saint Candida (disambiguation), several people
- Cándida Arias (born 1992), Dominican Republic volleyball player
- Cândida Branca Flor (1949–2001), Portuguese entertainer and traditional singer
- Candida Cave, British artist and writer
- Candida Donadio (1929–2001), American literary agent
- Candida Doyle (born 1963), Irish keyboard player with the band Pulp
- Candida Gertler (born 1966/67), British art collector
- Candida Lycett Green (1942–2014), Irish-born British author
- Candida Höfer (born 1944), German photographer
- Candida Moss (born 1978), British intellectual, journalist, New Testament scholar, and professor of theology
- Candida Royalle, American pornographic producer-director and actress
- Candida Thompson (born 1967), English violinist
- Candida Tobin (1926–2008), British author of a music education system
- Saint Candida the Elder (died 78 AD), early Christian saint from Naples
- Cándida María de Jesús (1845–1912), Spanish nun
- Maria Candida of the Eucharist (1884–1949), Roman Catholic Carmelite nun, beatified by Pope John Paul II
- Candida Xu (1607–1680), Chinese Catholic and philanthropist
