= Cândido =

Other names
- Related names: Candido, Cándido

Cândido is a Portuguese masculine given name, equivalent of Spanish Cándido

- Cândido de Oliveira (1896–1958), Portuguese football player
- Cândido Firmino de Mello-Leitão (1886–1948), Brazilian zoologist
- Cândido José de Araújo Viana (1793–1875), Brazilian writer
- Cândido Rondon (1865–1958), Brazilian military officer
- Cândido Vaccarezza (born 1955), Brazilian gynecologist and politician
- José Cândido Carvalho (1914–1989), Brazilian writer
- José Cândido da Silveira Avelar (1843–1905), Azorean historian

== See also ==
- Candido
- Cándido
