= 2nd Pennsylvania Heavy Artillery Regiment =

Union Army artillery regiment

2nd Pennsylvania Heavy Artillery
- Pennsylvania flag
- Active: January 8, 1862, to January 29, 1866
- Country: United States
- Allegiance: Union
- Branch: Heavy Artillery
- Engagements: Siege of Petersburg; Battle of Chaffin's Farm

The 2nd Pennsylvania Heavy Artillery was a heavy artillery regiment that fought in the Union Army during the American Civil War. It was the largest regiment to serve in the Union Army, with over 5,000 officers and enlisted men in its ranks at one time or another - in fact, while it was recruiting, there were so many applicants that another regiment was created to take the excess men: the 2nd Pennsylvania Provisional Artillery.

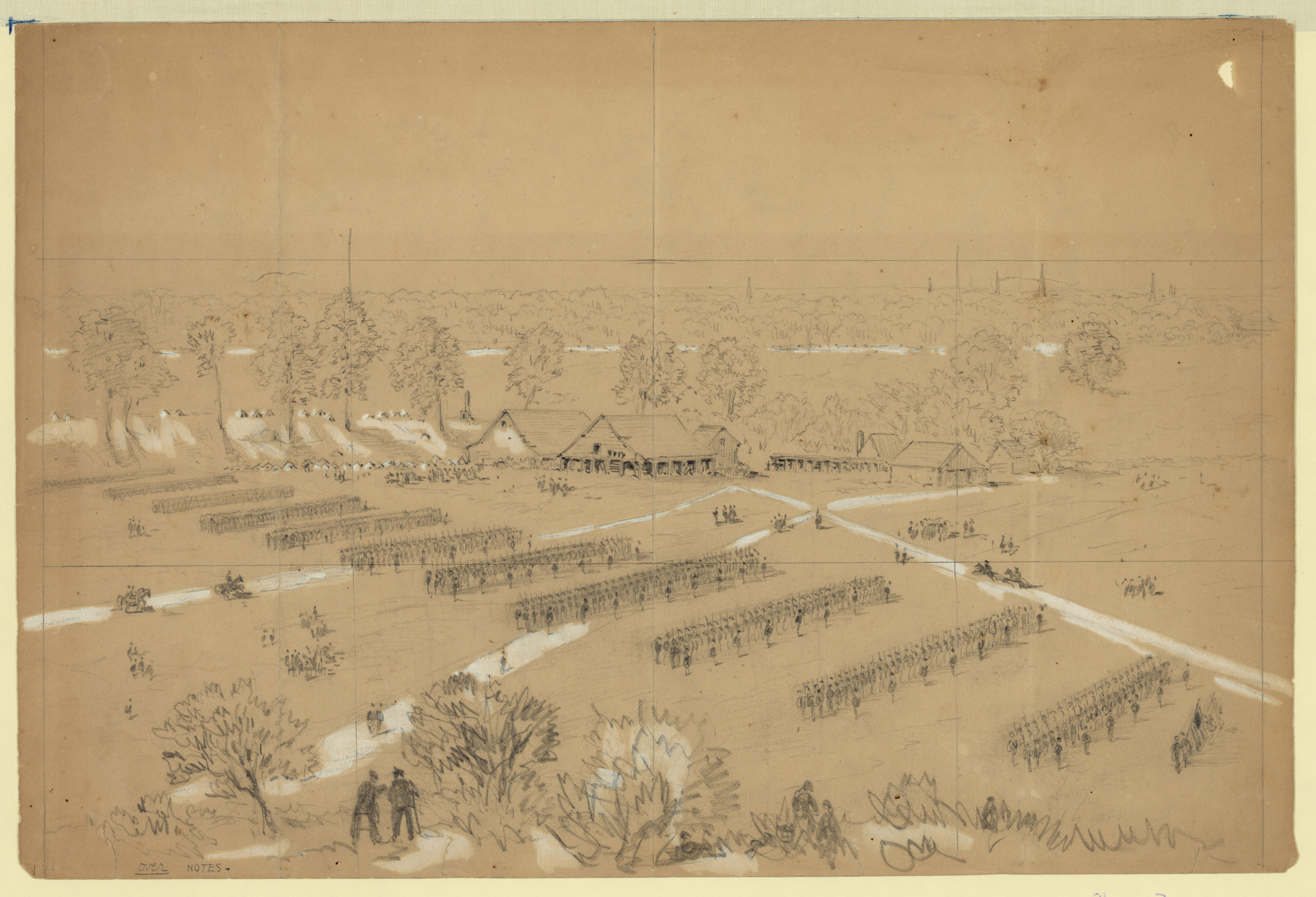
Inspection of the 2nd Pennsylvania Artillery by Gen Adelbert Ames, sketch by William Waud

== History ==
Recruitment for the regiment started in October 1861 from the city of Philadelphia and the counties of Franklin, Allegheny, and Monroe. Charles Angeroth was the regiment's first colonel, John H. Oberteuffer Sr. was the lieutenant colonel, and William Candidus was the major. Ten companies were mustered in on January 8, 1862, and ordered to Washington, D.C. They spent the next two years constructing and garrisoning various fortifications around the city, including Fort Stevens.

Angeroth resigned in June 1862 and was replaced by Augustus A. Gibson of the 2nd U.S. Artillery as colonel. Candidus also resigned in August and was replaced by James L. Anderson. In November, two more companies were added to the regiment, raising the total strength to 1,800 men in twelve companies. In February 1863, the regiment was formally assigned to the XXII Corps, Department of Washington, first as part of the 1st Brigade, Haskins' Division, and later of the 1st Brigade, DeRussy's Division.

So many recruits joined the regiment that by the spring of 1864, it numbered over 3,300 officers and enlisted men. Since the army needed troops at the front lines, on April 20, the War Department ordered the "surplus" officers and men to form a second regiment, the 2nd Pennsylvania Provisional Heavy Artillery. This provisional regiment was sent to the Army of the Potomac as part of the IX Corps. The original regiment was assigned to that army as well on May 27 as part of the XVIII Corps. It arrived at Cold Harbor on June 4 but did not participate in the battle. Too large to operate as a single unit, it was divided into three four-company battalions.

The 2nd saw its first battle on July 15, when the XVIII Corps made some of the first assaults in the Siege of Petersburg. Gibson was replaced on July 21 by Anderson. The regiment fought in several battles and skirmishes for the next several months, often losing heavily. For example, it lost 465 men at the Battle of Chaffin's Farm alone. Its losses were replaced somewhat by the consolidation of the 2nd Provisional Regiment back into the original regiment.

During an attack on Fort Harrison, Anderson was killed and Sadler was captured. With no field officers left, new ones were appointed from the company commanders. Captain William M. McClure of Company F was appointed colonel, Captain S. D. Strawbridge lieutenant colonel, and Captain Benjamin F. Winger, major.

In January 1865, the regiment reenlisted and, with additional recruits, numbered 2,000 officers and men. McClure was honorably discharged on March 7. Strawbridge succeeded him to command of the regiment, Winger was promoted to lieutenant colonel, and Captains David Schooley and William S. Bailey to major. After the breakthrough at Petersburg on April 2, it was assigned to provost duty in the city. After the Confederate surrender at Appomattox Court House, the companies were scattered around southeastern Virginia to maintain order. The 2nd was finally mustered out on January 29, 1866, at City Point, Virginia, and was discharged at Philadelphia on February 16.

== Casualties ==
- Killed and mortally wounded: 5 officers, 221 enlisted men
- Wounded: ? officers, ? enlisted men
- Died of disease: 5 officers, 385 enlisted men
- Captured or missing: 863 officers and ? enlisted men
- Total: 873 officers, 606 enlisted men
