= Maria Cândido =

Brazlilian artisan

Maria de Lourdes Cândido
- Born: February 11, 1939 (age 86); Juazeiro do Norte, Brazil
- Known for: Sculpture

Maria de Lourdes Cândido (born February 11, 1939) is a Brazilian artisan working in clay.

She was born in Juazeiro do Norte and began making toys out of clay for her children. She later began to "bake" these figures and sell them in the local market. She developed her own style and went on to produce painted figures from kaolin, some realistic and some imaginary. Her work now sells throughout Brazil, but also in Europe and the United States.

In 2004, she was named a "Living Treasure" by the Secretary of Culture for the state of Ceará. In 2013, she was named to the Ordem do Mérito Cultural.
