= Candida Tobin =

Candida Tobin Hon FTCL, LTCL (5 January 1926 – 14 December 2008) was the author of the Tobin Method, a music education system for teaching music theory and practice to students of all ages and abilities.

== Personal life ==
Tobin was born Doreen E. Pugh in Chingford, Essex on 5 January 1926 and grew up there with elder sisters Phyllis and Barbara. Tobin was married twice, firstly to Derrick Llewelyn Mason (1924–1989) in 1949, and divorced soon after without any issue. She subsequently married John M. Tobin in 1960, and had two children, Penelope A. and David Richard Tobin. Her grandson is Lloyd James Tobin, who is a successful Jungle & UK Hardcore producer under the alias Arkyn.

Tobin died at her UK home in Sawbridgeworth, Hertfordshire on 14 December 2008, aged 82, of cancer.
