= William Candidus =

American opera singer

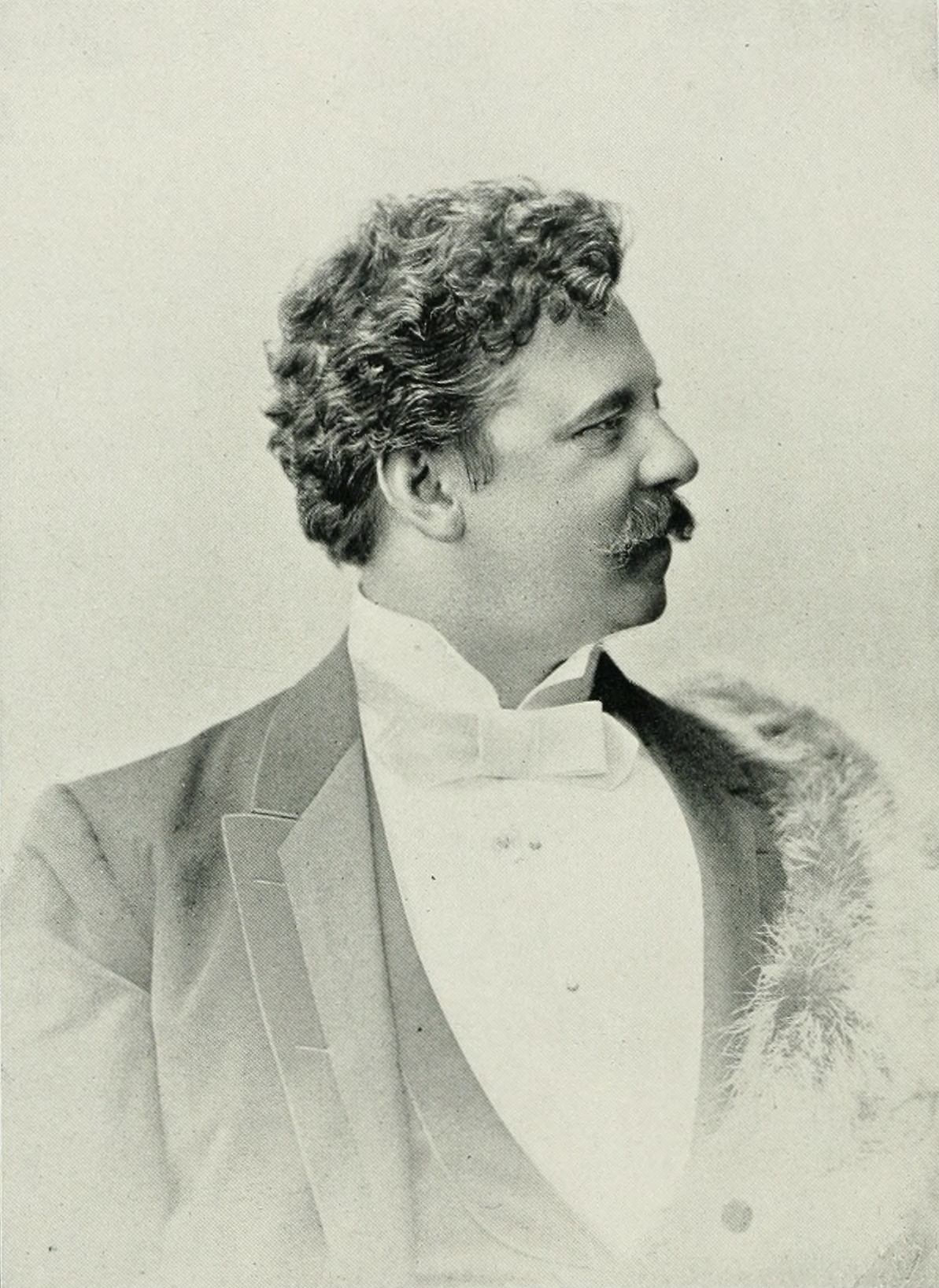

Background information
- Genres: opera

William Candidus (July 23, 1840 – April 1910 was an American opera singer.

== Biography ==
Candidus was born on July 23, 1840, in Philadelphia, Pennsylvania.

In 1861, he sang first bass in several Philadelphia musical societies. During the American Civil War, he served three years in the 2nd Pennsylvania Heavy Artillery and elsewhere, being advanced to the grade of major. During his military service, his voice gradually changed from first bass to tenor. After his return from the war, he accepted the position of tone regulator in the piano factory of Steinway & Sons, in New York City. He became a member of the Arion and Liederkranz societies, but soon went abroad and studied for the operatic stage under Konapazeck (Konaptczek) of Berlin, making his début in Weimar as Stradella. Subsequently, he studied under Rouchetti (Stefano Ronchetti-Monteviti), of Milan, and in 1880 became a member of the opera at Frankfort am Main, where he remained until the autumn of 1885, when he joined the American Opera Company.

Candidus died in April 1910 in Frankfurt am Main, Germany.
