= Cándido =

Cándido is a Spanish male given name, equivalent of Portuguese Cândido.

Those with the name include:

- Cándido Bareiro (1833–1880), President of Paraguay
- Cándido Camero (1921–2020), Cuban conga and bongo player
- Cándido Conde-Pumpido (born 1949), Spanish judge
- Cándido Fabré (born 1959), Cuban musician
- Cándido López (1840–1902), Argentine painter and soldier
- Cándido Muatetema Rivas (born 1960), former Prime Minister of Equatorial Guinea

== See also ==
- Candido
- Cândido
