= Giacomo Candido =

Italian mathematician (1871–1941)

- Born: 10 July 1871; Guagnano
- Died: 30 December 1941 (aged 70); Galatina
- Education: University of Pisa
- Known for: Candido's identity
- Scientific career
- Fields: Mathematics, History of mathematics

Giacomo Candido (10 July 1871, in Guagnano – 30 December 1941, in Galatina) was an Italian mathematician and historian of mathematics.

== Education and career ==
In 1897 Candido received his Laurea (teaching degree) from the University of Pisa and started to teach mathematics: first, at the Liceo of Galatina, then at the Liceo of Campobasso and from 1927 at the Liceo of Brindisi.

He was an editor and contributor for the Periodico di Matematica per l'Insegnamento secondario and was one of the founders of the journal La Matematica elementare (an intermediate-level journal for teachers, engineers and students).

He was an Invited Speaker of the ICM in 1928 in Bologna and in 1932 in Zürich. In 1934 he founded the Apulian branch of Mathesis, an Italian association of mathematics teachers.

He is also remembered for his work on the history of mathematics.

== Candido's identity ==
Candido devised his eponymous identity to prove that

$(F_n^2 +F_{n+1}^2 +F_{n+2}^2 )^2= 2(F_n^4 +F_{n+1}^4 +F_{n+2}^4 )$

where F_{n} is the nth Fibonacci number.
The identity of Candido is that, for all real numbers x and y,

$(x^2 +y^2 +(x+y)^2 )^2= 2(x^4 +y^4 +(x+y)^4 )$

It is easy to prove that the identity holds in any commutative ring.

== Selected publications ==
- Sulle funzioni U_{n} , V_{n} di Lucas in Periodica matematica, anno XVII, 1901–1902
- La formola di Waring e sue notevoli applicazioni, Tipografia editrice salentina, 1903
- Su d'un' applicazione delle funzioni U_{n} , V_{n} di Lucas in Periodica matematica, anno XX, 1904–1905
- Le equazioni reciproche in senso generale in Periodico matematica, anno XXI, 1905–1906
- Il fondo Palagi-Libri della Biblioteca Moreniana di Firenze, in Atti del II Congresso della Unione Matematica Italiana, ed. Cremonese, 1941
- Sulla mancata pubblicazione nel 1826 della celebre memoria di Abel, ed. Marra, Galatina, 1942
- Conferenze e discorsi, ed. Marra, Galatina, 1943
- Scritti matematici, ed. Marzocco, Firenze, 1948
