= SS Empire Candida =

World War II merchant ship of the United Kingdom

History
- Name: Empire Candida (1942-47); Burdale (1947-48); Peldale (1948-54); Statius Jansen (1954-59); Sunny (1959-69)
- Owner: Ministry of War Transport (1942-47); Zinal Shipping Co Ltd (1947-48); Z Shipping Co Ltd (1948-54); Jansens Rederei A/Z (1954-59); New China Steamship Co Ltd (1959-61); P T Maskapai Pelayaran (1961-69)
- Operator: Frederick Jones & Co Ltd (1943-47); Burness Shipping Co Ltd (1947-54); Jansens Rederei A/Z (1954-59); Wallem & Co (1959-61); P T Maskapai Pelayaran (1961-69)
- Port of registry: (United Kingdom) West Hartlepool (1942-47); (United Kingdom) London (1947-48); (United Kingdom) Newcastle upon Tyne (1948-54); (Norway) Bergen (1954-59); Hong Kong (1959-61); (Indonesia) Jakarta (1961-69)
- Builder: William Gray & Co. Ltd.
- Launched: 8 December 1942
- Completed: February 1943
- Identification: Code Letters BFFW (1942-47); United Kingdom Official Number 168951 (1942-54)
- Fate: Scrapped 1969.

General characteristics
- Tonnage: 2,908 GRT; 1,645 NRT
- Length: 315 ft 4 in (96.11 m)
- Beam: 46 ft 5 in (14.15 m)
- Depth: 23 ft 0 in (7.01 m)
- Installed power: triple expansion steam engine
- Propulsion: Screw propeller

Empire Candida was a 2,908 GRT cargo ship which was built in 1942 for the Ministry of War Transport (MoWT). She was sold in 1947 and renamed Burdale and resold in 1948 and renamed Peldale. In 1954, she was sold to Norway and renamed Statius Jansen. A further sale to Hong Kong in 1959 saw her renamed Sunny. In 1961, she was sold to Indonesia, serving until she was scrapped in 1969.

== Description ==
The ship was built by William Gray & Co. Ltd., West Hartlepool. She was launched on 8 December 1942 and completed in February 1943.

The ship was 315 feet 4 inches (96.11 m) long, with a beam of 46 feet 5 inches (14.15 m) and a depth of 23 feet 0 inches (7.01 m). Her GRT was 2,908 and she had a NRT of 1,645.

She was propelled by a triple expansion steam engine which had cylinders of 20 inches (51 cm), 31 inches (79 cm) and 55 inches (140 cm) diameter by 48 inches (120 cm) stroke. The engine was built by Central Marine Engine Works Ltd, West Hartlepool.

== History ==
Empire Candida was built for the MoWT. She was placed under the management of Frederick Jones & Co Ltd. Her port of registry was West Hartlepool. The Code Letters BFFW were allocated. Her Official Number was 168951.

Empire Candida was a member of a number of convoys during the Second World War.

KMS 22

Convoy KMS 22 departed Liverpool on 28 July 1943 and arrived at Gibraltar on 9 August. It departed the same day and arrived at Port Said, Egypt on 20 August. Empire Candida joined the convoy at Bône, Algeria and left it at Tunis, Tunisia. The voyage immediately preceding this was from Bizerta, Tunisia to Bône. Part of her cargo was Tiger Tank No. 131, which had been captured by the Allies. The tank is now preserved at the Bovington Tank Museum, Hampshire.

MKS 37

Convoy MKS 37 departed Port Said on 10 January 1944 and arrived at Gibraltar on 22 January 1944. It departed the same day and arrived at the Clyde on 3 February. Empire Candida joined the convoy at Bizerta, Tunisia and left it at Bône.

KMS 45

Convoy KMS 45 departed from the United Kingdom and arrived at Algiers, Algeria on 29 March 1944. Empire Candida joined the convoy at Oran, Algeria bound for Algiers.

KMS 46

Convoy KMS 46 departed from the United Kingdom and arrived at Bône on 9 April 1944. Empire Candida joined the convoy at Algiers and left it at Augusta, Italy.

KMS 50

Convoy KMS 50 departed from the United Kingdom and arrived at Oran on 16 May 1944. Empire Candida joined the convoy at Algiers and left it at Augusta.

ON 171

Convoy ON 171 departed from Liverpool on 4 March 1943 and Reykjavík, Iceland on 7 March. It arrived at Halifax, Nova Scotia on 23 March. Empire Candida was a member of this convoy.

In 1947, Empire Candida was sold to Zinal Shipping Co Ltd, London and renamed Burdale. She was operated under the management of Burness Shipping Co Ltd. The following year, she was sold to Z Shipping Co Ltd, Newcastle upon Tyne and renamed Peldale, remaining under Burness's management. In 1954, Peldale was sold to Jansens Rederei A/Z, Bergen and renamed Statius Jansen. In 1959, she was sold to the New China Steamship Co Ltd, Hong Kong and renamed Sunny. She was placed under the management of Wallem & Co Ltd, Hong Kong. In 1961, Sunny was sold to P T Maskapai Pelayaran, Sumatera, Indonesia. In 1969, she was sold for scrapping. On the voyage to the breakers she developed a leak on 5 April 1969 at 20°10′N 120°25′E. She was escorted into Kaohsiung, Taiwan, arriving on 8 April.
