= Candidus (Celtic spirit) =

Candidus was a "candid spirit" that accompanied the healing god Borvo in Lusitanian and Celtic polytheism. This association is demonstrated in Nièvre at Entrains-sur-Nohain. He has been described as "a minor deity in Apollo’s train who calls to mind Apollo Virotutis ‘truth’ and Apollo's role as revealer of the truth through oracles".
