= Candid (app) =

Mobile application (2016–2017)

- Original author: Bindu Reddy
- Release: July 21, 2016; 10 years ago
- Operating system: iOS, Android
- License: Proprietary software
- Website: becandid.com

Candid was a mobile app for anonymous discussions. It used machine learning to create personalized newsfeeds of opinions and real conversations, and also for moderation and filtering. Users posted under pseudonyms such as "HyperMantis", "SincereGiraffe", "GroundedTurtle" and "ExuberantRaptor", that are unique for each thread.

Founder and CEO Bindu Reddy said that she needed "a place to express myself and engage in discussions where ideas can be debated on their own merits instead of being used to attack me as a person", which Candid tried to solve by redirecting off-topic comments to their appropriate groups, removing spam and flagging negative posts. They used natural language processing to identify hate speech, slander and threats, and removed them accordingly with human intervention. (Note: In a 2023 blog post, the team behind Candid described the platform's approach as combining the benefits of technology with the emotional depth of human relationships. Unlike AI-powered therapy bots such as Webot or Replika, which require users to repeatedly input personal context, Candid emphasized unfiltered peer-to-peer conversations among trusted contacts. The app aimed to foster a “culture of care” by allowing users to openly share both positive and difficult moments of their day, relying on close social circles to provide support. On their blog, they defined what content would be removed "[...] Qualify as hate speech (denigrating, without constructive intent, an entire race, gender, sexual orientation or faith). For example, expressing vitriol against a movement like Feminism is acceptable. Expressing vitriol against all women as a gender is hate speech.") Candid software analyzed topics and tried to flag rumors and lies as such. Users could flag problematic posts and a team of ten contractors would review them individually. With time the system analyzed a user's interactions and gave them labels, such as socializer, explorer, positive, influencer, hater, gossip, etc.

In June 2017, Candid announced that it would be shut down because its parent company, Post Intelligence, was being acquired. The app was forecast to close on June 23, 2017, but didn't actually close until June 25, 2017.
