= Transpetro =

Petrobras Transporte S.A. Transpetro
- Type: Private
- Industry: Oil and gas industry
- Founded: 1998
- Headquarters: Rio de Janeiro, Brazil
- Key people: Sergio Hermes Martello Bacci (CEO)
- Services: Oil transportation Pipeline services
- Revenue: ▲US$5.5 billion (2010)
- Net income: ▲US$263.2 million (2010)
- Number of employees: 5,326 (2021)
- Parent: Petrobras
- Website: www.transpetro.com.br

Petrobras Transporte S.A., commonly shortened Transpetro, is the largest oil and gas transportation company of Brazil. Transpetro works with transportation and storage activities of oil and byproducts, ethanol, biofuels and natural gas. It is responsible for a network of more than 11,000 kilometres (7,000 mi) of oil and gas pipelines, connected to terminals and an oil tanker fleet (15 Ships by 100000 tons), in 2015. Transpetro's fleet consisted of 6 gas carriers, 16 oil tankers, 5 product tankers, and 9 shuttle tankers as of 2023.

Transpetro, a fully owned subsidiary of Petrobras, was established on 12 June 1998, as per legislation (Act no. 9.478/1997) which restructured the oil sector in Brazil. In addition to Petrobras, Transpetro provides services to several distributing companies and to the petrochemical industry.

== History ==
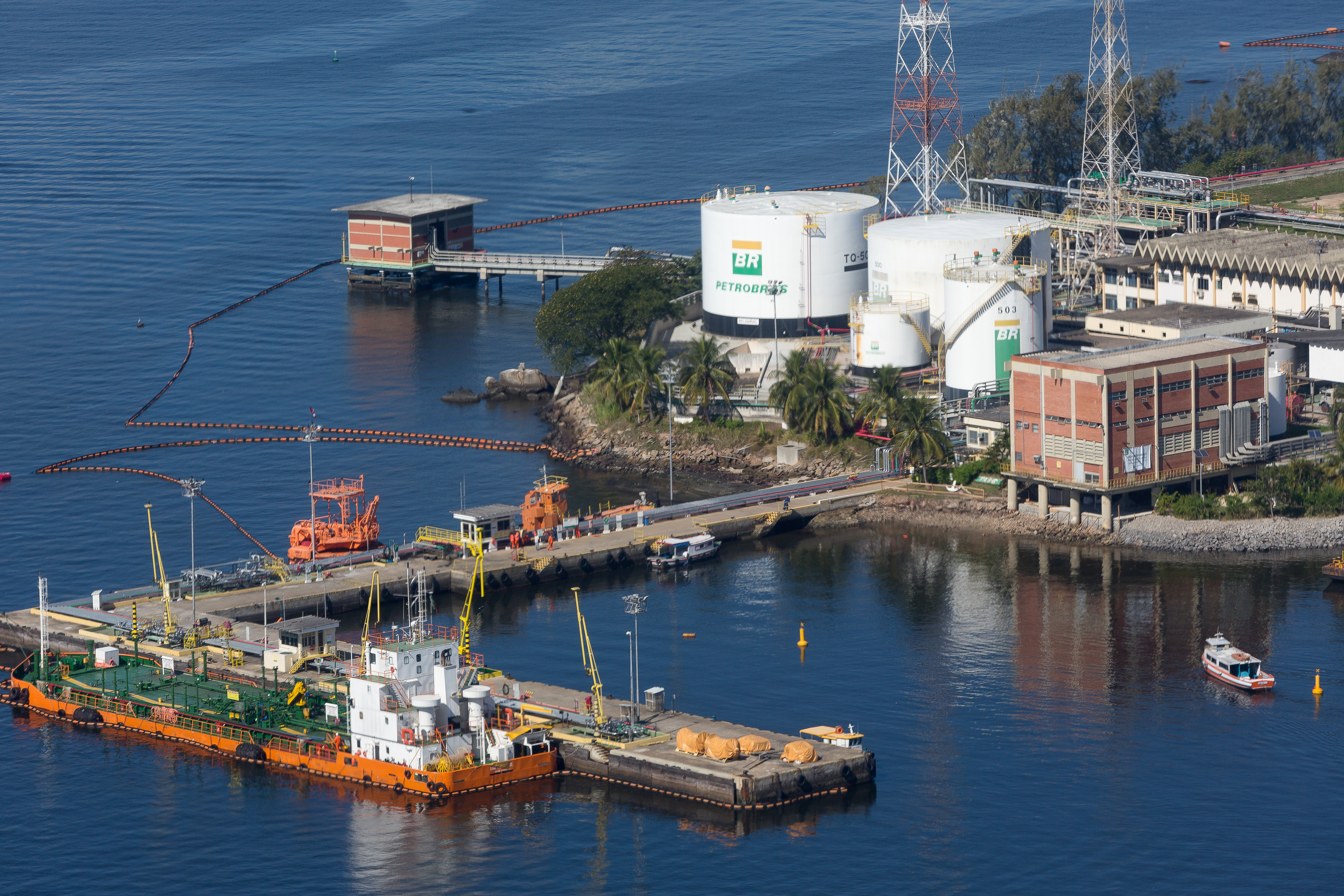
Aerial photo of Transpetro - Ilha D'Água.

Transpetro was established by Law No. 9,478/1997 and was officially constituted on June 12, 1998. Starting from the year 2000, the company took over the operation of Petrobras' pipelines and terminals.

In 2009, the São Paulo-Brasília Oil Pipeline, Brazil's largest polyduct, was inaugurated, and the Urucu-Coari gas pipeline became operational.

In 2019, Transpetro was awarded the concession for the Belém do Pará Aquaviary Terminal for a period of 20 years.

In 2022, a subsidiary named Transbel was established under Transpetro to manage the operations of the Belém Aquaviary Terminal. Transpetro won the lease for the BEL09 area, also for a duration of 20 years.

== Operations ==
The company operates nationwide, with facilities in 17 states of Brazil.

- 7,768 km of oil pipelines
- 625 km of gas pipelines
- 21 land terminals
- 27 waterway terminals
- 3 Liquefied Natural Gas (LNG) regasification terminals
- 36 ships in the fleet

It operates in the areas of: pipelines and terminals, and maritime transport.

== Renewable Energy Initiatives ==
Transpetro, Petrobras' logistics subsidiary, is considering projects to power its 48 terminals with renewable energy, according to Marcio Guimaraes, the director of ducts and terminals. A solar plant in São Paulo state, managed by Transpetro, will soon supply enough energy to cover all operations at the company's terminal in Guarulhos International Airport. This move aligns with Petrobras' strategy to transition into an energy company and supports Brazilian President Luiz Inacio Lula da Silva's goal for an energy transition in Brazil.

Transpetro has already invested 12 million reais ($2.37 million) in the solar project at Guarulhos and plans to start a new project at the Coari Waterway Terminal in Amazonas, which is expected to be finished next year. This project will utilize solar and hydroelectric power, along with battery storage. While Guimaraes did not specify a timeline, the commitment to renewable energy is clear across the company's operations. The current exchange rate mentioned is $1 equal to 5.0574 reais.
