= Saint Candida (disambiguation) =

Saint Candida most commonly refers to Candida the Elder (died c. AD 78), early Christian saint from Italy, celebrated on 4 September. Candida means white in Latin.

Saint Candida may also refer to:

== Saints ==
- Saint Candida (Carthage) (died c. 300), Eastern Orthodox saint martyred in Carthage, celebrated on September 20
- Saint Candida (died 418), Eastern Orthodox saint from Constantinople, celebrated on August 29
- Saint Candida (died c. 798), Eastern Orthodox saint from Spain celebrated on January 27
- Saint Wite (died c. 861), saint from Dorset, England
- Candida Maria of Jesus (1845–1912), Spanish nun and saint

== Other uses ==
- Saint Candida (film), 1945 Argentine film about Candida the Elder

== See also ==
- Maria Candida of the Eucharist (1884–1949), Italian blessed
- Saint Candidus (died c. 287 AD), saint from Egypt
- Candida (disambiguation)
