= Condução coercitiva =

Brazilian legal summons

Condução coercitiva (Note: There is no accepted translation or English equivalent of condução coercitiva in reliable sources. There is no exact equivalent of the concept in common law, although it is similar to a material witness subpoena. A brief, fairly literal rendering of the term might be coerced conveyance, which renders its two essential features: 1) it involves conveying a person to the authorities, and 2) it is compulsory and will be backed by police force against the wishes of the person involved if resisted.) is a Brazilian judicial mandate or summons, which provides for a compulsory method of bringing subjects of a judicial process, victims, witnesses, accused parties, or expert subjects into the presence of law enforcement or judicial authorities against their wishes. This is a measure provided for in the Penal Code of Brazil (CPP) as a means of compelling the appearance of a person to attend an action to which he was summoned, but who failed to do so without justification.

According to some jurists, this is a form of short-term "precautionary detention" (prisão cautelar) whose purpose is to ensure the convenience of the production of proof. If equated with precautionary detention, condução coercitiva is contrary to the Brazilian Constitution of 1988 Article 5, paragraph LXI, even though the procedure is in the Penal Code of Brazil, instituted in 1941.

The CPP authorizes the enforcement of the condução coercitiva of victims, witnesses, defendants, and experts who refuse to appear in court, and who may even be handcuffed and brought by police vehicle. Article 218 of the CPP refers to the requirement of prior summons (Portuguese: intimação). Thus, some argue that even with the justification of providing clarification to the police investigation and even in the interests of justice, the condução coercitiva warrant without a summons violates the right to liberty of witnesses and defendants. According to this line of thinking, the only ones who can be compelled to appear by a condução coercitiva are those witnesses who were appropriately summoned beforehand and who fail to attend the act to which they were summoned, without valid cause, may be compelled to appear via a condução coercitiva warrant.

There is some controversy concerning the exact legal foundation and even constitutionality of the condução coercitiva warrant. From a legal perspective, it is not the same as an arrest warrant.

== See also ==
- Federal Police of Brazil
- Material Witness
- Operation Car Wash
- Public Prosecutor's Office (Brazil)
