= Cândido Vaccarezza =

Brazilian gynecologist and politician (born 1955)

Cândido Elpídio de Souza Vaccarezza
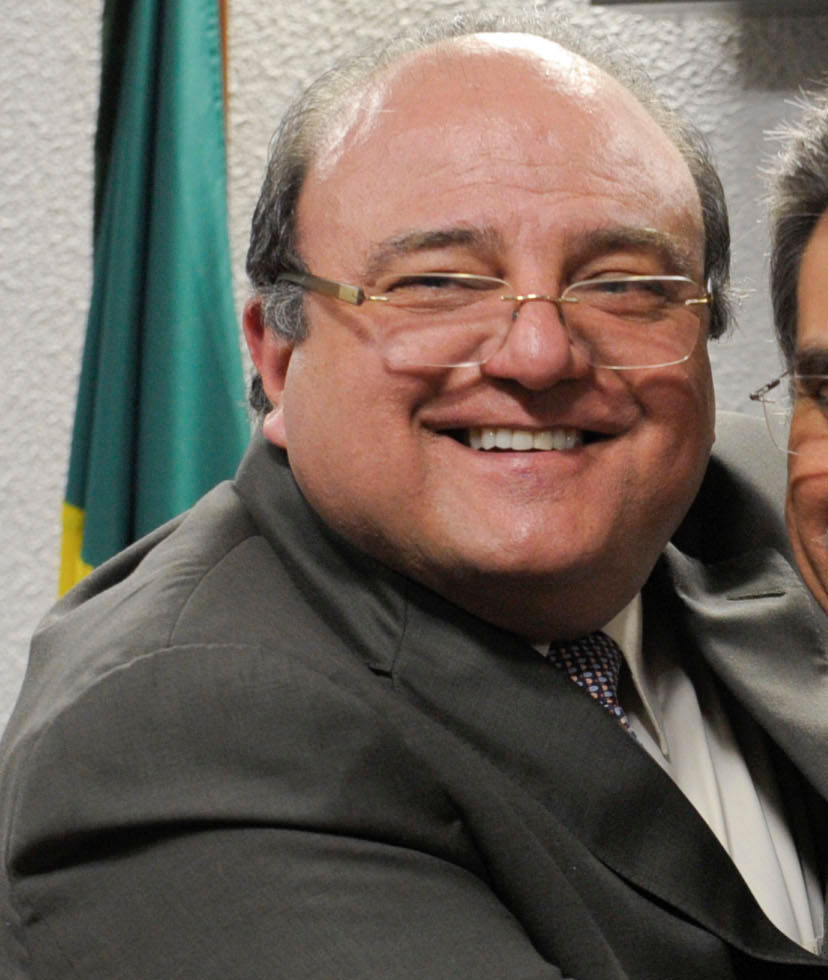

Federal deputy
- In office 1985–2012

Personal details
- Born: September 26, 1955 (age 71) Senhor do Bonfim, Bahia, Brazil
- Party: AVANTE
- Occupation: Doctor; Statesman

Cândido Elpídio de Souza Vaccarezza (born September 26, 1955) is a Brazilian gynecologist and politician affiliated to Avante (political party). He was born in Senhor do Bonfim, Bahia and moved to São Paulo. He ran for the office of state representative of the State of São Paulo in 1998, obtaining the substitutive position. He was elected to the same position in 2002. In 2006, he was elected federal deputy. He became leader of the party in February 2009 and then, on January 1, 2010, leader of the Luiz Inácio Lula da Silva administration in the House of Representatives. In Dilma Rousseff's administration, he remained in office until March 2012.
