= Candido =

Candido is both a given name and a surname. Notable people with the name include:

== Given name ==
- Candido Amantini (1914–1992), Italian Roman Catholic priest
- Candido Camero, known simply as "Candido" (1921–2020), Cuban percussionist
- Candido Jacuzzi (1903–1986), Italian-American inventor
- Candido Portinari (1903–1962), Brazilian painter
- Candido Tirona (1863–1896), Filipino Revolutionary

== Surname ==
- Antonio Candido (1918–2017), writer, professor, and literary critic
- Candy Candido (1913–1999), American actor and bass player
- Chris Candido (1972–2005), American professional wrestler
- Giacomo Candido (1871–1941), Italian mathematician
- Johnny Candido (born 1982), American professional wrestler
- Rino De Candido (born 1954), Italian cyclist

== Pseudonym ==
- Jose Martinez Ruiz (1873–1967) Spanish essayist

== See also ==
- Candido (magazine) (1945–1961), Italian weekly monarchist satirical magazine, funded by Giovannino Guareschi
- Cándido
- Cândido
