= Offshoots of Operation Car Wash =

Criminal investigations of Brazilian corruption

Operation Car Wash Operação Lava Jato
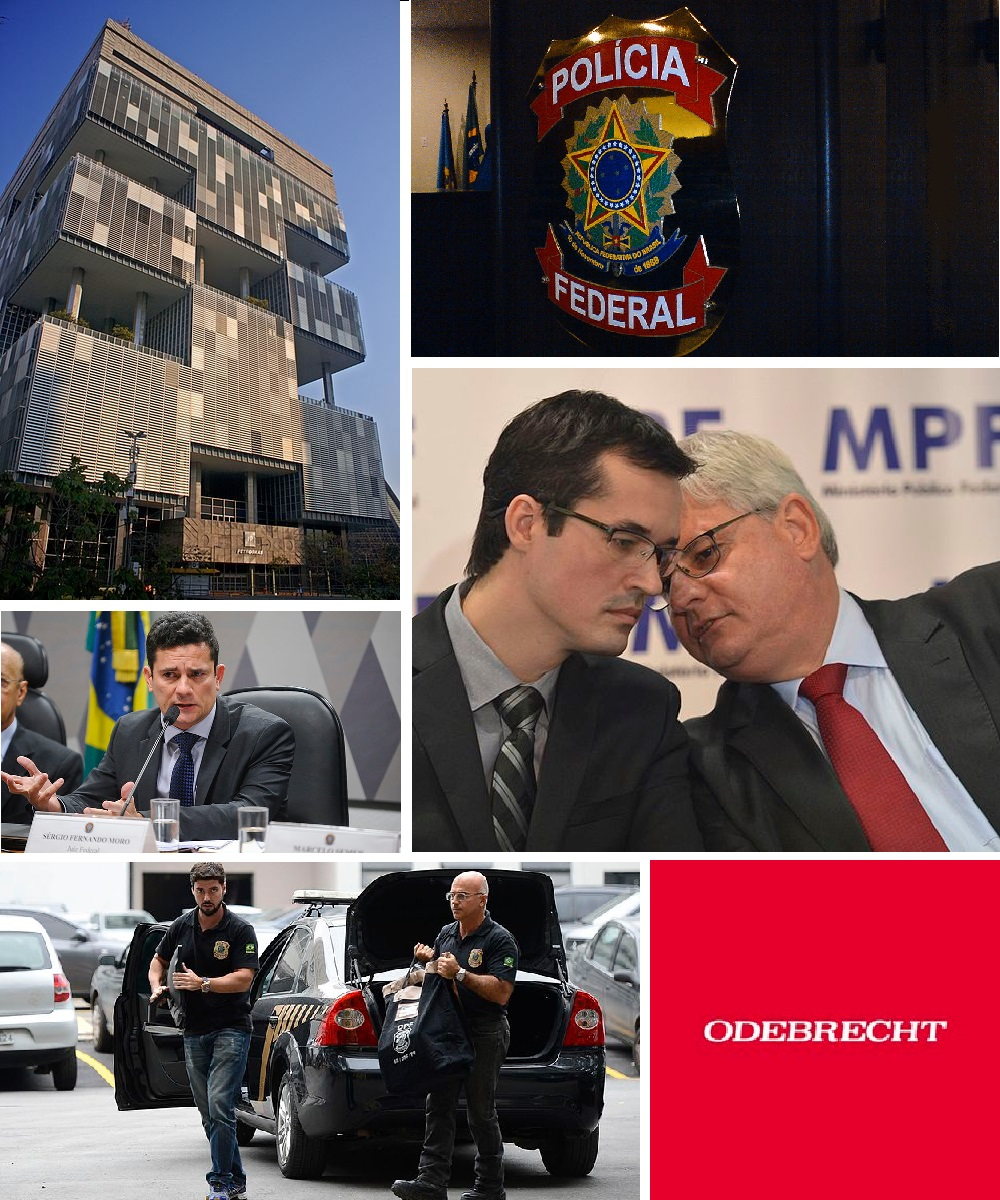
- Clockwise from top left: Headquarters of Petrobras in Rio de Janeiro; Emblem of the Federal Police of Brazil; Deltan Dallagnol with Rodrigo Janot; Odebrecht logo; Federal Police in an operation; Judge Sergio Moro
- Type: Anti-corruption
- Scope: Brazilian federal government

Participants
- Executed by: Lead prosecutor: Deltan Dallagnol (March 2014 – September 2020); Primary judge: Sergio Moro (March 2014 – November 2018); All judges: Judge: (Curitiba); Sergio Moro 17 March 2014 – 2 November 2018; Gabriela Hardt presiding as substitute 2019 to 6 March 2019; Luiz Antonio Bonat 6 March 2019 – 1 February 2021; Federal judge: (Rio de Janeiro); Marcelo Bretas (2015–2021); Federal judge: (Brasília); Vallisney de Souza Oliveira (2016–2021); Federal judge: (Porto Alegre); Leandro Paulsen (2015–2021); João Pedro Gebran Neto (2015–2021); Judge: (Superior Court of Justice); Felix Fischer (2015–2021); Judge: (Supreme Federal Court); Teori Zavascki (2014–2017); Edson Fachin (2017–2021)
- Countries participating: Brazil
- No. of countries participating: At least 11

Timeline
- Date begin: 2014
- Date end: 2021

Results
- Suspects: 429 individuals
- Indictments: 429
- Convictions: 159
- Miscellaneous results: Penalties paid by Petrobras: US$682.6 million to the Brazilian government; US$85.3 million to the US Department of Justice; US$85.3 million to the United States Securities and Exchange Commission; R$6.2 billion (US$2.5 billion) identified as misappropriated from Petrobras; R$46.3 billion (c. US$8 billion) reimbursement requested by Petrobras; R$3.28 billion (US$912 million) recovered

A long series of criminal investigations have occurred in Brazil associated with the anti-corruption probe Operation Car Wash, since the first one began in March 2014. These investigations are considered offshoots of the original phased investigations.

== Background ==
Operation Car Wash (Portuguese: Operação Lava Jato) is an ongoing investigation into money laundering and political corruption in Brazil, which has been led by investigative judges, and carried out by the Federal Police.

Since its initiation in March 2014, many supplemental investigations that were offshoots of the original one have been conducted by the Public Prosecutor's Office, the Attorney General's Office and the Federal Police from documents collected from search warrants, depositions from condução coercitiva (Note: Condução coercitiva – literally, coerced conveyance; a compulsory order to appear, to assist in an investigative or judicial proceeding, either as a victim, a witness, an expert, and so on. Not an arrest, but has the power of police enforcement behind it to compel compliance.) warrants, and documents and testimony obtained through plea bargaining (delação premiada). (Note: Delação premiada – literally, "rewarded whistleblowing" (or, "informing). A legal process by which a suspect is offered a specific reduced sentence prescribed by law, in return for turning in accomplices, or aiding in investigations. The common name for it in Brazil is colaboração premiada ("rewarded collaboration"). The concept is similar to a plea bargain, in return for investigative assistance.)

It has resulted in more than a thousand judicial warrants being served for three investigative judges. Politicians from Brazil's largest parties, including former presidents of Brazil, presidents of the Chamber of Deputies and the Federal Senate, and state governors are involved, as well as businessmen from large Brazilian companies. Originally a money laundering investigation, it expanded to cover allegations of corruption at the state-controlled oil company Petrobras, where executives allegedly accepted bribes in return for awarding contracts to construction firms at inflated prices. At the time Petrobras had more debt and a higher market valuation that any other corporation. It accounted for more than an eighth of all investment in Brazil. The investigation is called "Operation Car Wash" because it was first uncovered at a car wash in Brasília. The Federal Police have called it the largest corruption investigation in the country's history. The investigation later spread well beyond its origins in the state of Rio de Janeiro to include systemic kickbacks in many sectors and levels of the Brazilian business world. More than £1.4 billion was siphoned from the economy, but Global Witness says that the cost to the country is as much as 800% more.

The goal of the investigation is to ascertain the extent of a money laundering scheme, estimated to be R$6.4–42.8 billion (US$2–13 billion), largely through embezzlement of Petrobras funds. At least eleven other countries, mostly in Latin America, were involved, and the Brazilian companies JBS S.A. and Odebrecht were also deeply implicated.

== In Brazil ==
=== 2015 ===
==== Operation Politeia ====
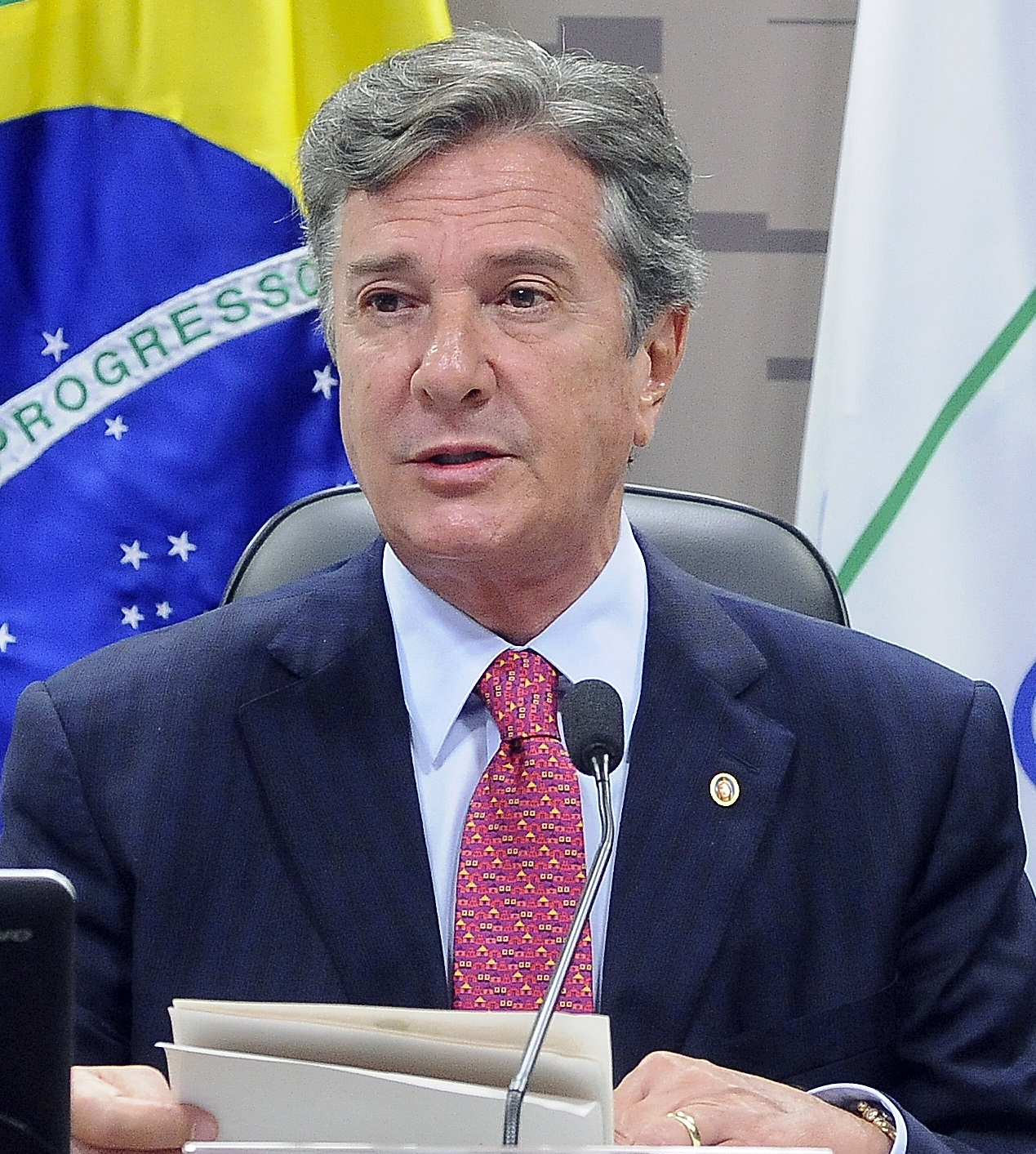
Fernando Collor (2017)

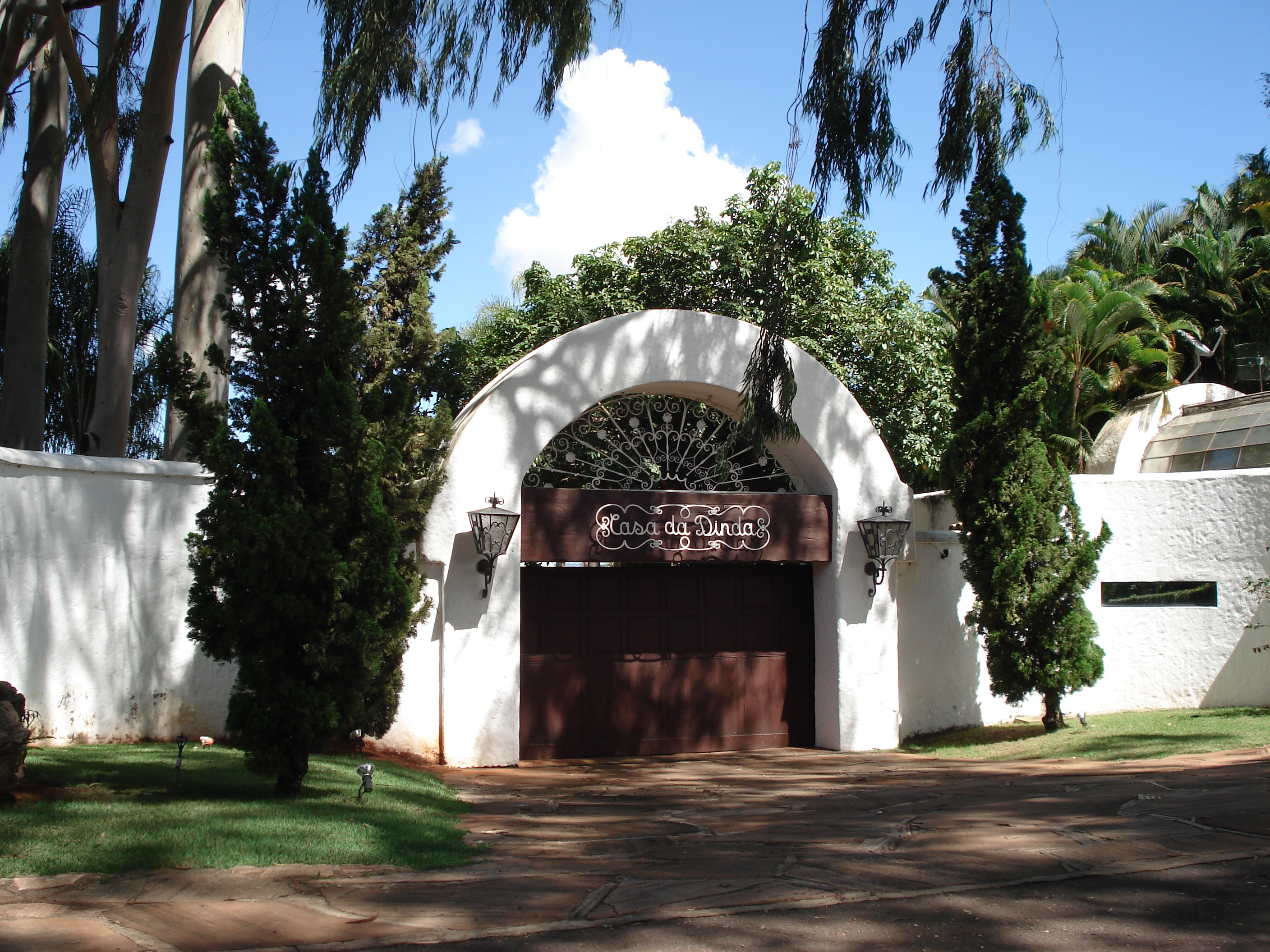
Casa da Dinda

On 14 July 2015, the Federal Police started Operation Politeia, issuing 53 search and seizure warrants at the homes of politicians involved in the Petrobras corruption scheme. After searches at 40 addresses in seven different states (including the Federal District), the Federal Police seized three luxury cars at the Casa da Dinda mansion owned by Fernando Collor de Mello and R$ 3.67 million ($930,000) in cash.

In addition to Collor search and arrest warrants were served on Senators Fernando Bezerra Coelho (PSB-PE) and Ciro Nogueira Lima (PP-PI), Federal Deputy Eduardo da Fonte (PP-PE), former Minister of Cities Mário Negromonte (PP-BA) and former Federal Deputy João Pizzolatti (PP-SC).

==== Arrest of Delcídio do Amaral ====
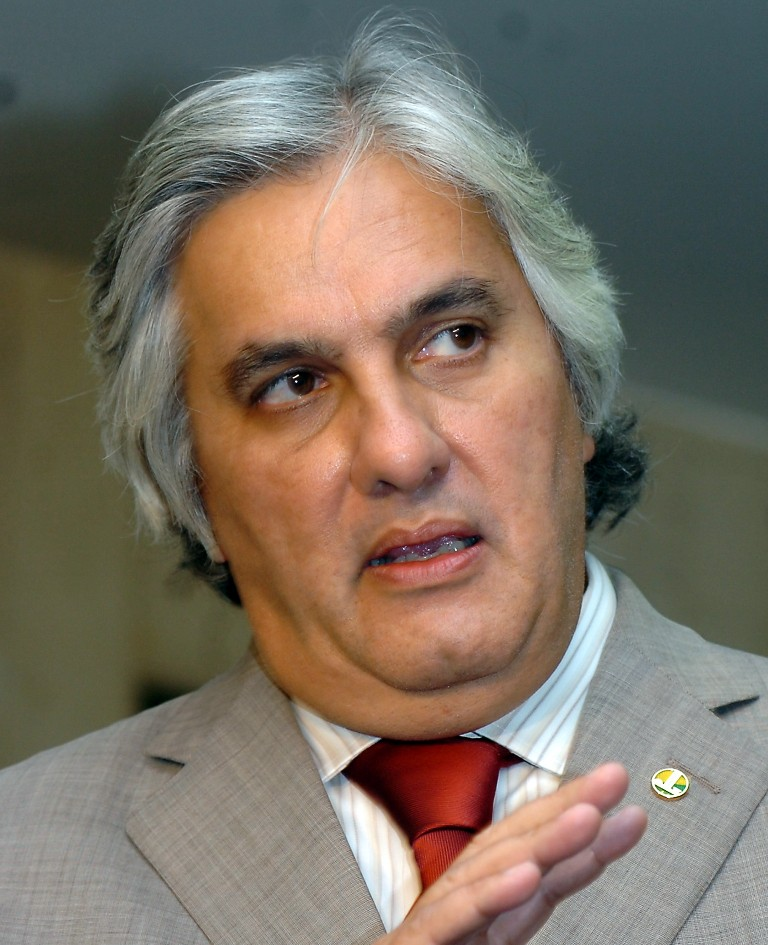
Senador Delcídio Amaral, from Agência Brasil (2008).

On 25 November 2015, the Federal Police arrested Senator Delcídio do Amaral for trying to impede the colaboração premiada (Note: Colaboração premiada – literally, "rewarded collaboration"; the common name for the legal process known as delação premiada in Brazil; which is a type of plea bargain involving informing or collaborating with investigations in return for specific reductions in sentence prescribed by the law.) (rewarded collaboration) of former Petrobras director Nestor Cerveró (Note: Petrobras director – Although often referred to in the press as "director of the international region", Petrobras does not formally have an International Board of Directors, but does have an International Management reporting to the Board of Exploration and Production.) about the senator's alleged participation in irregularities in the purchase of Pasadena Refining System in the state of Texas. Police said in 2015 that they had found evidence of $15 million in bribes related to the purchase of the refinery Petrobras first held a 50% share of the refinery, then later bought the other half as well, as a result of a dispute with its partner, Astra Oil, which had purchased the entire refinery in 2005 for US$42.5 million. A year later Petrobras bought a half interest in the refinery for US$360 million. They wound up paying $820.6 in 2012 when a US court enforced a provision of the sales contract. In January 2019 Petrobras signed a sale agreement for their interest in Pasadena Refinery, as well as three refineries he in Brazil, Abreu e Lima (RNEST), Landulpho Alves (RLAM), Presidente Getúlio Vargas (REPAR) and Alberto Pasqualini (REFAP).

Cervero was sentenced 17 August 2015 to 12 years in prison for money laundering and corruption for a bribe paid to the speaker of the lower house by Samsung Heavy Industries for two drillship contracts. Cervero had previously been sentenced to five years for using a shell company to launder money stolen from Petrobras and buy a luxury apartment in Rio de Janeiro. Petrobras fired him in 2014.

According to investigators, Delcídio offered Cerveró an opportunity to escape, so that he wouldn't testify against him in return for a reduced sentence. The authorities saw this as an attempt to obstruct justice. A recording made by Cerveró's son showed the Senator's intention to interfere in the investigations and offer the former executive escape so that he would not talk. In addition to Delcídio do Amaral and his chief of staff, two others were also arrested in the affair; banker André Esteves, then CEO of BTG Pactual, and Nestor Cerveró's defense lawyer Edson Ribeiro.

Brazil's currency fell 2% on news of the arrests. BTG is Latin America's largest investment bank, and Delcídio had been head of the Senate economic affairs committee, deeply involved with proposed austerity measures.

==== Operation Craton ====
On 8 December 2015, Operation Craton, an offshoot of Operation Car Wash launched to combat the illegal exploitation of diamonds on Cinta Larga indigenous lands in Rondônia. About 200 federal police officers served 90 warrants, including 11 pre-trial detention, 41 search and seizure and 35 condução coercitiva warrants. Warrants were served in the Federal District, Rondônia, Minas Gerais, São Paulo, Rio de Janeiro, Paraná, Rio Grande do Sul, Bahia, Mato Grosso and Pará. Information on the extraction of the precious stones was obtained during investigations against the money changer Carlos Habib Chater, owner of the "Posto da Torre" car wash in Brasília for which Operation Car Wash was named.

==== Operation Barren Lives ====
On 11 December 2015, federal police launched Operation Barren Lives (Operação Vidas Secas ) as an offshoot of Operation Car Wash. It investigated invoice padding for works on the São Francisco River. There were 32 court orders, 24 of which were for search and seizure, four for temporary arrest and four for condução coercitiva warrants. The president of Construtora OAS, Elmar Varjão, was held in São Paulo, and executives of Coesa Engenharia, Barbosa Melo and Galvão Engenharia, were arrested in the operation. According to investigators, entrepreneurs used shell companies to divert at least $200 million. The value of the investigated contracts is R$680 million ($170,000,000).The Federal Police also pointed to the participation of JD Consultoria, a company belonging to former Minister José Dirceu, arrested in Operation Car Wash. The Federal Police's regional superintendent in Pernambuco, Marcelo Diniz, said the PF had found a transfer of R$586,000 ($149,000) from Galvão Engenharia to JD Consultoria.

==== Operation Catiline Orations ====
On 15 December 2015, the Federal Police launched a new offshoot of Operation Car Wash, dubbed "Operation Catiline Orations" (Operação Catilinárias), serving search and seizure warrants at the official residence of Deputy Eduardo Cunha (PMDB – Rio de Janeiro), in Brasília. Warrants were also served at Rio de Janeiro addresses of the PMDB. Police also carried out a search and arrest warrants at the homes of Federal Deputy Aníbal Gomes (PMDB -Ceará) and Minister of Science and Technology Celso Pansera.

Others involved in the operation are Senator Edison Lobão (PMDB – Maranhão), former Minister of Mines and Energy; Henrique Eduardo Alves (PMDB – Rio Grande do Norte), then Minister of Tourism and Sérgio Machado, a former president of Transpetro named by PMDB. The main purpose of the Federal Police was to prevent destruction of evidence. Documents were seized in Recife, Brejão, Agreste, and Petrolina, in Sertão. All seized material was sent to Recife and then to Brasília.

==== Operation Black Blood ====
On 17 December 2015, Operation Black Blood investigated money diverted from Petrobras contracts since 1997. The lawsuit relates to investigations into a bribery scheme involving the Dutch company SBM Offshore and the Brazilian state-owned oil company. Four pre-trial detention warrants were served, two of which were against former directors arrested in Operation Car Wash, Renato Duque and Jorge Zelada. Police searched the homes of the respondents and the offices of Petroserv, an oil prospecting company. According to the investigations, Petroserv received transfers of 3% to 5% of games contracts from Petrobras and, of this total, sent 1% to accounts of companies abroad. Investigators point out that this money was laundered and remitted to Brazil as a bribe. In June this year, former SBM representative in Brazil Júlio Faerman, whistleblower and one of the scheme operators investigated by Lava Jato. told the Petrobras CPI that he guaranteed "significant gains" to the Brazilian state-owned company while acting on behalf of the Dutch company. A month earlier, CPI members went to London to gather testimony from Jonathan David Taylor, a former SBM director who reported irregularities in contracts signed between the Dutch company and Petrobras.

=== 2016 ===
==== Operation Recipient ====
On 26 February 2016, Operation Recipient (O Recebedor) investigated an alleged bribery and fraud scheme in the construction of the North-South Railway and West-East Railway based on evidence gathered in Operation Car Wash. In all, the Federal Police served seven condução coercitiva warrants and 44 search and arrest warrants in six states—Paraná, Maranhão, Rio de Janeiro, São Paulo, Minas Gerais, Goiás—and the Federal District. The operation, by the Federal Prosecutor's Office and the Federal Police in Goiás, targeted contracts signed between the state-owned company Valec S/A, responsible for railway construction, and contractors investigated in the oil industry, such as Odebrecht, Brazilian industrial conglomerate Queiroz Galvão, UTC Engenharia, Grupo OAS, Mendes Júnior, Grupo Camargo Corrêa, among others. According to the Federal Police, the contractors made regular payments through mock contracts to a law firm and to two other companies nominated by José Francisco das Neves, known as "Juquinha", former president of Valec.The companies acted as a front to hide the illicit origin of the money. All were charged with passive corruption (Note: Passive corruption (corrupção passiva) – A crime committed by a public official, which consists of soliciting or receiving, for themselves or on behalf of someone else, an undue benefit (vantagem indevida), or a promise of such benefit. The term "passive" doesn't refer to initiation of a corrupt action, but rather to who receives the benefit. For example, if a driver offers a cop money in order to avoid a ticket and the cop accepts, the cop has committed passive corruption (and the driver has simultaneously committed active corruption). If the cop suggests the bribe, it's still passive. Per art. 317 of the Penal Code. Considered a "crime against public administration".) and money laundering. José Francisco das Neves ("Juquinha") was acquitted of the charges on appeal: in October 2023 the Federal Regional Court of the 1st Region (TRF-1) unanimously overturned his conviction, a decision that became final in 2024.

The name of the operation refers to the defense presented by one of the targets in a previous investigation called the Trem Pagador ("Pay Train"). In it, the defense alleged that "if the train was the paymaster, the target was not the recipient". According to the Public Prosecutor's Office in Goiás, Camargo Corrêa admitted having paid R$800,000 ($200,000) to Juquinha. In that one state alone, the authorities estimated that the scheme diverted R$630 million ($160,000,000) from the public coffer. In administrative-improbity lawsuits concerning the North–South Railway works, the Federal Justice in Goiás dismissed the charges against José Francisco das Neves and his family on the merits in 2025: it found no causal link between their conduct and the alleged illicit enrichment (case no. 0016729-53.2016.4.01.3500), and no proof of fraud, intent (dolo) or overpricing, a 2021 court-appointed expert examination having concluded that there was no overpricing in the works (case no. 0014595-29.2011.4.01.3500).

==== Operation Xepa ====
On 22 March 2016, the 26th phase of Operation Car Wash launched, called Operation Xepa, an offshoot of Operation Acarajé. In Operation Xepa, 67 search and seizure warrants, 28 condução coercitiva warrants, 11 temporary arrest warrants and 4 preventive arrest warrants were executed in the states of São Paulo, Brasília, Santa Catarina, Pernambuco, Minas Gerais, Rio de Janeiro, Rio Grande do Sul, Piauí and Bahia. The Federal Police discovered, through analysis of documents from the Acarajé operation, cash payments to third parties indicated by senior Odebrecht executives, using financial operators in the parallel foreign exchange market to make illegal payments.

==== Operation Janus ====
On 20 May 2016, PF launched Operation Janus, focusing on international influence peddling at Odebrecht S.A. and in the family of the former president Lula. Among the targets of the operation was Lula's nephew, Taiguara Rodrigues dos Santos, taken to the stand. The intention of the investigation was to verify whether contracts of a company, which belongs to Taiguara, were used with Odebrecht for the payment of undue advantages. The judge Vallisney de Souza Oliveira, of the 10th Federal District Court, responsible for the case, issued four search and seizure warrant and condução coercitiva warrants, authorizing the breach of bank secrecy, tax and computerized data of nine suspects. The investigation that supported the warrants was opened on 23 December 2015.

==== Operation Brazil Cost ====
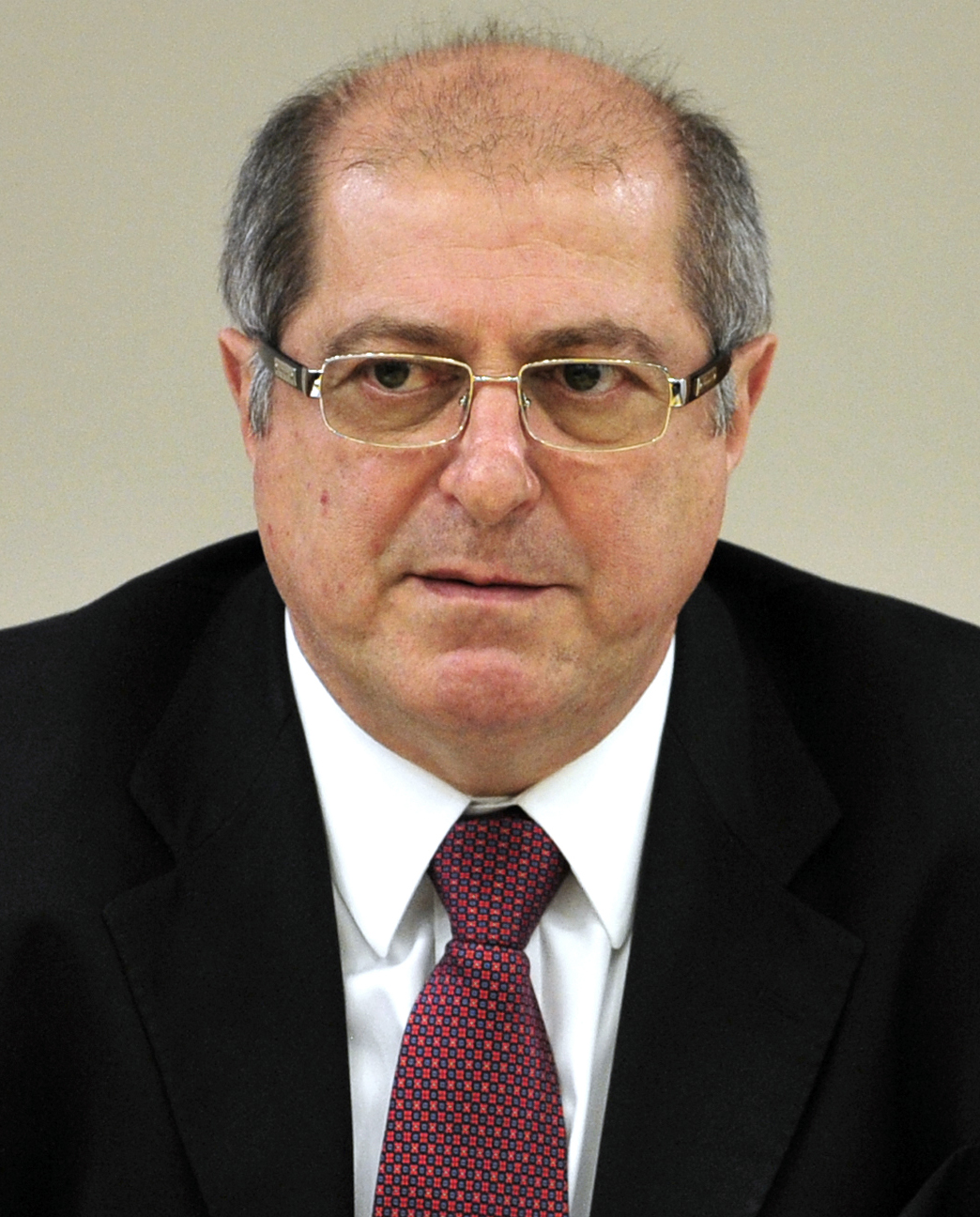
Ex-minister Paulo Bernardo was arrested in the operation.

On 23 June 2016, the Federal Police launched Operation Brazil Cost, (Note: Brazil cost – (from Portuguese: Custo Brasil) is the increased cost of doing business in Brazil based on in-country factors, such as administrative corruption, excessive bureaurocracy, dysfunctions in import-export operations, inefficiency in public services, and others.) with searches in São Paulo, Curitiba, Pernambuco and Rio Grande do Sul, and with the arrest of the former Minister of Planning of the Lula administration and of Communications in the first Dilma administration, Paulo Bernardo. The operation is an offshoot of the 18th phase of Operation Car Wash. Paulo is the husband of Senator Gleisi Hoffmann (Workers' Party-Paraná) and he was arrested in Brasília. Carlos Gabas, former Minister of Social Security of the Dilma administration, was the target of search and seizure. The operation involved the computer company Consist Software. The Federal Police suspected a R$100 million ($25,000,000) bribe by this company in a contract assignment scheme at the Ministry of Planning when Paulo Bernardo was minister. In the same operation, agents of the Federal Police seized computers, documents and archival material at the headquarters of the national executive committee of the Workers' Party in downtown São Paulo.

==== Operation Periodic Table ====
On 30 June 2016, the Federal Police launched a joint operation called "Operation Periodic Table" on behalf of three governmental units, in order to fulfill 44 search and seizure warrants and 14 condução coercitiva warrants in the state of Goiá, and eight other federative units. (Note: Federative unit – Brazil is a federation (official name: Federative Republic of Brazil) containing several subnational units, such as 26 states, and the Federal District) About 200 federal police officers, 26 federal criminologists, and 52 CADE agents participated in the operation. These operations were carried out for the Center for the Fight against Corruption of the Goiás Federal Public Prosecutor's Office, the Federal Police Superintendency in Goiás State, and for the Superintendency General of the Administrative Council for Economic Defense (CADE).

==== Operation Raider ====
On 30 June 2016, the Federal Police launched Operation Raider (Saqueador) in conjunction with the Federal Public Prosecutor, investigating a $370 million money laundering organization centered on Governor Sérgio Cabral Filho (PMDB). Arrested in the operation were Carlinhos Cachoeira, Cláudio Abreu in Goiás and lobbyists Adir Assad and Marcelo José Abudd. One of the targets, contractor Fernando Cavendish, owner of Construtora Delta, who had been out of the country, was arrested as he landed at Aeroporto Internacional Tom Jobim. The Attorney General's Office (PGR) stated that the embezzlement of public funds by construction company Delta Engenharia in Rio de Janeiro, had the "sponsorship" of the former governor. Between 2007 and 2012, 96.3% of Delta's revenue came from public funds, almost 11 billion reals ($2.8 billion). Of this total, 370 million reals ($94 million) were allegedly laundered through eighteen "companies" located at the addresses of a dentist's office, plaster shop, and even a bush at the side of the road. Some addresses did not exist. The scheme involved embezzlement of funds for major public works, such as construction of the Maria Lenk Aquatics Centre for the 2007 Pan American Games and renovation and construction for the 2014 FIFA World Cup.

==== Operation Sepsis ====
1 July 2016, Federal Police launched Operation Sepsis, another Car Wash spinoff. Money changer Lúcio Bolonha Funaro, who had ties to Eduardo Cunha, was arrested in the operation. In all, 19 search and seizure warrants and one pre-trial arrest warrant were fulfilled. The other targets were Joesley Batista, one of the partners of J&F Investimentos, Eldorado, J&F Investimentos' pulp arm, lobbyist Milton Lira, Cone Multimodal, a multimodal logistics and industrial infrastructure company, and Henrique Constantino, entrepreneur, co-founder of Gol Linhas Aéreas Inteligentes (Gol).

==== Operation Pripyat ====
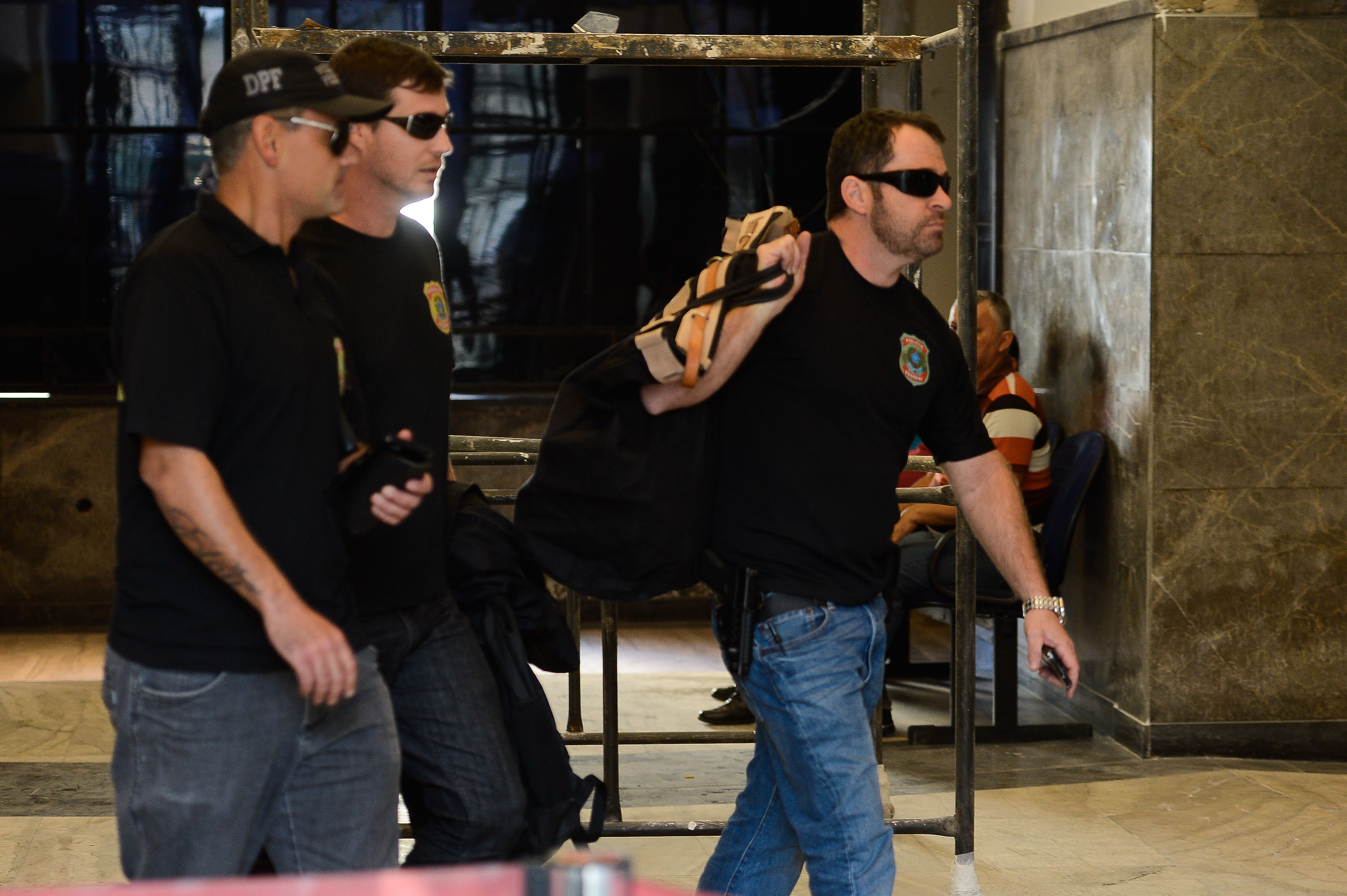

On 6 July 2016, Federal Police started Operation Pripyat to dismantle a gang that was active in the Eletronuclear subsidiary of Eletrobras responsible for nuclear power generation. One of the main targets of the operation was Vice Admiral Othon Pinheiro da Silva, former president of the state-owned company, who served time under house arrest. The other suspects were former employees of the company. By court order, the president of the subsidiary at the time, Pedro Diniz Figueiredo, was removed from office. In all, the police served nine arrest warrants (six preventive and three temporary), nine condução coercitiva warrants, and 26 search and seizure warrants in the states of Rio de Janeiro and Porto Alegre. The action was an offshoot of Operation Car Wash that uncovered a corruption scheme in the electricity sector similar to that of Petrobras in the oil sector, and was conducted by the 7th Federal Criminal Court of Rio de Janeiro.

==== Operation Brotherhood ====
On 10 August 2016, in an offshoot of Operation Pripyat, the Federal Police launched Operation Brotherhood, which resulted in the arrest of Samir Assad, who was accused, along with his brother Adir Assad and nine others of setting up a caixa 2 slush fund scheme of contractors that allowed the payment of almost R$178 million ($45,100,000) in bribes to managers of Eletronuclear between 2008 and 2013. The brothers' financial center operated for at least three major contractors, Andrade Gutierrez, Delta and Odebrecht, in projects such as the construction of the Angra III nuclear power plant, the renovation of Maracanã Stadium for the 2014 World Cup and the implementation of the Rio de Janeiro Petrochemical Complex, in Itaboraí. The scheme consisted of issuing counterfeit invoices (Note: Notas frias – (literally, "cold notes") are phony receipts (notas fiscais falsas) which are for a service that was never actually performed or which was allegedly provided by a non-existent company, or by people who appropriate blank receipt forms belonging to firms that have closed down or are inactive.) for services never rendered, to feed a caixa dois slush fund for payment of bribes. They had companies such as JSM Engineering and Earthworks, SP Earthworks and Legend, whose sole purpose was to issue and spread the fake invoices.

==== Operation Deflection ====
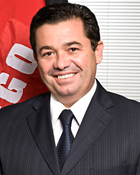
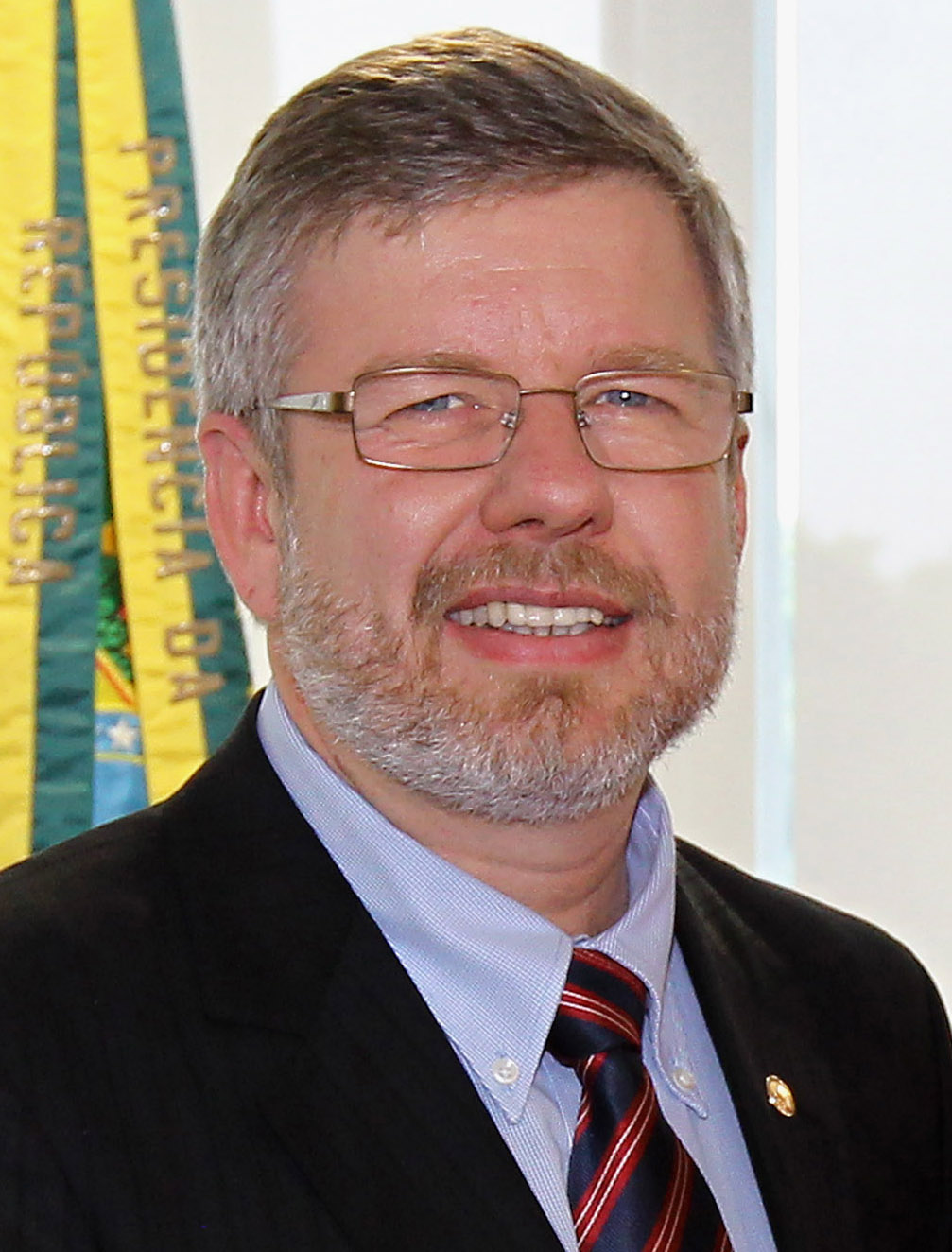
Vital do Rêgo and Marco Maia, targets of Operation Deflection.

On 5 December 2016, the Federal Police launched Operation Deflection, which involved Vital do Rêgo, the then minister of the Tribunal de Contas da União (TCU), and Marco Maia, federal deputy and former president of the Chamber of Deputies. The targets of this new operation were suspected of having negotiated bribes with contractors targeted by the Parliamentary Investigation Commission into Petrobras, which was initiated in the National Congress in May 2014. The investigations began when the former leader of the Dilma government in the Brazilian Senate, Delcídio do Amaral, revealed in his delação premiada that the Parliamentary Investigation Commission was used for fraudulent businesses. According to the investigators, there was evidence that Vital do Rêgo requested R$5 million ($1,000,000) from contractors for his campaign for governor of Paraíba state. Brazilian civil engineering conglomerate Grupo OAS donated half of that quantity to the National Directorate of the Brazilian Democratic Movement (PMDB), the political party with which the TCU minister was affiliated. The other half was transferred via a "caixa 2" slush fund, to Construtora Planície, which was also targeted by a search and seizure warrant.

Deputy Marco Maia, in his turn, was suspected of having received R$200,000 ($51,000) in cash. Júlio Camarco allegedly delivered the money to an assistant of the former president of the Chamber of Deputies. Besides Delcídio the contractor Léo Pinheiro, of Construtora OAS also denounced Vital do Rêgo and Marco Maia. In October 2016, Pìnheiro's attorney delivered evidence to Judge Sérgio Moro that, in his view, proved that bribes had been paid to Vital.

==== Operation Out of Control ====
On 13 December 2016, the Federal Police launched Operation Out of Control (Operação Descontrole) which investigated the president of the Rio de Janeiro State Court of Accounts (TCE-RJ), Jonas Lopes de Carvalho, the target of a condução coercitiva compulsory appearance warrant. The president's son, Jonas Lopes Júnior, and Jorge Luiz Mendes Pereira da Silva (a.k.a., "Doda"), appointed as Lopes's operator, were also brought in to testify. The Superior Court of Justice provided the three condução coercitiva warrants. Federal police officers also served ten search and seizure warrants. Delegations of Andrade Gutierrez executives named Jonas Lopes, showing that he was one of the ones who benefited most by the dual payment scheme in major projects of the Rio de Janeiro government, as revealed by Operation Calicute. According to the Federal Police, the operation investigated crimes of passive corruption and money laundering.

=== 2017 ===
==== Operation Cui Bono? ====
On 13 January 2017, the Federal Police launched Operation "Cui Bono?", an offshoot of Catiline Orations. They found a cell phone at Eduardo Cunha's home that contained, among other things, messages exchanged between the former deputy and Geddel Vieira Lima. Geddel served as Vice President of Corporate Affairs at Caixa Econômica Federal between 2011 and 2013, a period investigated by the Federal Police. The name of the operation, cui bono, means, in Latin, "to whose benefit?"

==== Operation Efficiency ====
On 26 January 2017, the Federal Police launched an operation code-named "Efficiency" (Operação Eficiência) that investigated active and passive corruption, crime syndicates, money laundering, and concealment of approximately 100 million dollars abroad, in an offshoot of Operation Calicute. Among the targets of the warrants was businessman Eike Batista.

One of the topics of inquiry was the payment of a 16.5 million dollar bribe by Eike Batista and Flávio Godinho (already under arrest) of EBX Group, to former governor Sérgio Cabral Filho of Rio de Janeiro using the Golden Rock account in Panama's TAG Bank. According to the Federal Public Secretary (Ministério Público Federal), the sum was requested by Cabral and Batista in 2010. According to the prosecutors, remittances were sent abroad by Cabral continuously between 2002 and 2007, reaching 6 million dollars. During his administration as governor, he collected more than 100 million reals ($25 million) in bribes, distributed among several accounts in banks in tax havens abroad. At least eleven other accounts were identified. The Federal Police served search and seizure warrants at about 40 addresses from those already arrested and others who gave testimony, and to companies investigated in that inquiry. According to the Federal Police, the Federal Public Prosecution Service has already repatriated about 270 million reals ($68 million), which are available to the Federal Court in an open account at Caixa Econômica Federal. The task force called for international cooperation to freeze and repatriate funds still hidden abroad.

==== Operation Peddler ====
On 2 February 2017, the Federal Police conducted Operation Peddler (Mascate) in conjunction with the Federal Prosecutor. It was an offshoot of Operation Calicute, one of the phases of Operation Car Wash. Ary Ferreira da Costa Filho, former special adviser to Sérgio Cabral Filho, was arrested on the Presidente Dutra Highway in Rio de Janeiro. At his arrest, he was suspected of fleeing, having been found with three thousand reals ($800) and a copy of his US visa.

==== Operation Leviathan ====
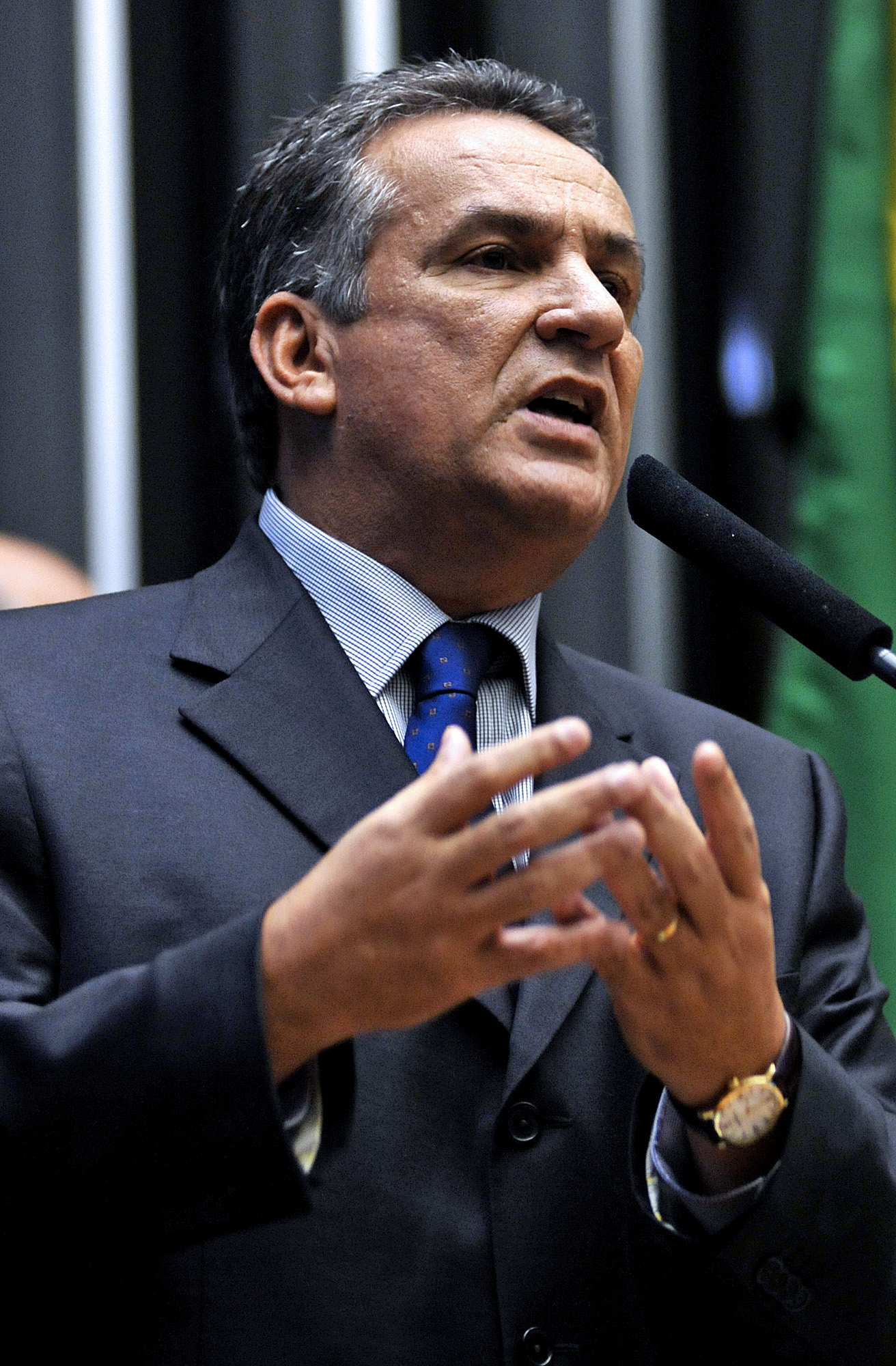
Senator Luiz Otávio in 2011.

On 16 February 2017, the Federal Police launched Operation Leviathan (Operação Leviatã) to serve search and seizure warrants in the homes and offices of people being investigated for kickbacks in the construction of the Belo Monte hydroelectric power plant in Pará, based on evidence collected from Operation Car Wash. Among the targets of the operation were the former senator from Pará Luiz Otávio (Brazilian Democratic Movement; PMDB) and the son of Senator Edison Lobão (PMDB-MA), Márcio Lobão. Minister Luiz Edson of the Supreme Federal Court issued the warrants for operation Leviathan. The searches were related to an inquiry underway at the Court to investigate payment by the Belo Monte consortium companies of a 1% bribe from the values of the plant's works to the Workers' Party (PT) and the Brazilian Democratic Movement (PMDB). The operation focused on the part of the scheme that passed money on only to the PMDB because the PT's part, not involving persons having foro privilegiado (Note: Foro privilegiado – literally, "privileged forum", and officially known as Foro especial por prerrogativa de função, this is a special status defined in the Constitution and accorded to certain high officials (President, Deputies, Senators, and certain others) that allows them to skip lower courts in the case of a criminal case against them and proceed directly to the higher courts.) status, is being processed in the Federal Court of Paraná. (Note: ...not involving persons having foro privilegiado is being processed in... Paraná – the point here being, that the operation is targeting one party and not the other, not for any discriminatory reason, but due to a jurisdictional one involving foro privilegiado status of the targets. People holding the office of Senator, like Otávio, have foro privilegiado under the Constitution of 1988 for actions carried out when they held that office, thus the jurisdiction in their case goes to the high court. The part of the case involving bribes involving the Workers' Party (PT), apparently, didn't involve officials that high up, meaning they didn't have foro privilegiado status, and their case would have been under the jurisdiction of a lower court.)

==== Operation Tolypeutes ====
On 14 March 2017, the Federal Police launched Operation Tolypeutes against a bribery and money laundering scheme in civil works contracts in the state of Rio de Janeiro, in particular in the construction of the Rio de Janeiro Metro Line 4. The targets of the operation were Heitor Lopes de Sousa Junior and Luiz Carlos Velloso, who were arrested. The action targeted the payment of bribes on contracts for the metro line. The new phase of Operation Car Wash was opened in conjunction with the Public Prosecutor's Office and Federal Revenue. Forty federal police officers served two pre-trial detention warrants, 13 arrest warrants and three condução coercitiva warrants issued by the 7th Federal Criminal Court of Rio de Janeiro, in the municipalities of Rio and Sapucaia. Investigations demonstrated the participation of the former Under Secretary of Transport of the State of Rio de Janeiro and of the director of the Rio de Janeiro Rail Transport Company (Riotrilhos) in the criminal enterprise, which sought out contractors interested in taking on infrastructure construction in the state, who would agree to charging undue advantages (Note: Payments of undue advantage – in Portuguese, "pagamento de vantagem indevida", a form of passive corruption, involving the solicitation or receipt of improper advantage (whether economic or otherwise), or the promise of it, related to one's public office, whether performed while in office or before or after their term.) in order to guarantee being hired for the services.

==== Operation Satellites ====
On 21 March 2017, the Federal Police launched Operation Satellite serving fourteen warrants at thirteen addresses in the cities of Brasília, Maceió, Recife, Rio de Janeiro and Salvador. The objective was to investigate evidence of active and passive corruption and money laundering crimes involving nonpolitical targets, but linked to senators Renan Calheiros (Brazilian Democratic Movement-Alagoas), Senate president Eunício Oliveira (Brazilian Democratic Movement-Ceará), Valdir Raupp (Brazilian Democratic Movement-Rondônia) and Humberto Costa (Workers' Party-Pernambuco). It was the first time information from the Odebrecht plea bargain agreement was used. This is the 7th phase of Operation Car Wash, which investigated the involvement of people with foro privilegiado status, before the Supreme Federal Court.

==== Operation Fifth of Gold ====
On 29 March 2017, the Federal Police launched Operation O Quinto do Ouro ("The Fifth of Gold") targeting the Rio de Janeiro State Court of Auditors. The delação premiada (literally, "rewarded whistleblowing" or, "informing") of former chairman Jonas Lopes de Carvalho Junior led to action against five board members in at least two kickback schemes to turn a blind eye to irregularities committed by contractors and bus companies operating in the state. Aloysio Neves (current president) was the target of pre-trial detention; as were Domingos Brazão, José Gomes Graciosa, Marco Antonio Alencar, son of former governor of Rio de Janeiro and former mayor of Rio de Janeiro Marcello Alencar, and José Maurício Nolasco. The president of the Legislative Assembly of Rio de Janeiro (Alerj), Jorge Picciani (Brazilian Democratic Movement; MDB), was already the target of a condução coercitiva warrant. Besides the assistance provided to the investigation via the delação premiada plea agreement of ex-president of the Rio TCE, (Note: TCE – Tribunal de Contas do Estado ("State Court of Auditors") Independent, technical organizations linked to the legislature, and present in each state and at the Federal level. They are charged with auditing public accounts in the name of the people.) the operation was supported by another delação premiada with his son; the two plea agreements having been recently approved by the minister of the Superior Court of Justice (STJ), (Note: Superior Court of Justice (Superior Tribunal de Justiça) – The highest appellate court in Brazil for non-constitutional questions of federal law. Justices in STJ (as in other Superior Courts) are called "ministers" not "justices"; not to be confused however with ministers from the executive branch.) Felix Fischer, who authorized the arrest warrants and condução coercitiva warrants. According to the accusation of one of the counselors, the state president and deputy of the Legislative Assembly of Rio de Janeiro, Jorge Picciani (MDB), is suspected of organizing payments to the five TCE advisers arrested in the operation. Members of the Court received 15% of the amounts released by the court's Modernization Fund for payment of overdue bills from food providers for inmates and adolescents undergoing detention measures. Picciani also organized Fetranspor's (Note: Fetranspor – Federação das Empresas de Transportes de Passageiros do Estado do Rio de Janeiro ("Federation of Passenger Transport Companies of the State of Rio de Janeiro").) payment of illicit amounts to the TCE to favor transport companies in court oversight.

==== Operation Exposed Invoice ====
On 11 April 2017, the Federal Police launched Operation Exposed Invoice (Fatura Exposta), which placed the former Secretary of Health of the State of Rio de Janeiro Sérgio Côrtes under arrest, accused of involvement in the millionaire corruption scheme run by the former state governor Sérgio Cabral Filho. The scheme revealed involved fraud at both the State Health Secretariat and the National Institute of Traumatology and Orthopedics (INTO), of which Côrtes was director, with the directing of bids in exchange for payment of bribes. In addition to the former secretary, two businessmen accused of involvement in the scandal were also arrested. The Federal Police reported that a total of three warrants for pre-trial detention, 20 warrants for search and seizure and three for condução coercitiva warrants, by the 7th Federal Criminal Court of Rio de Janeiro and that those involved will be held accountable for passive and active corruption, (Note: Active corruption (corrupção activa) – A crime committed by an individual targeting a public official. Active corruption consists in the act of offering any kind of benefit or advantage (economic, or otherwise) to a public official, to cause them to perform an official act, or to prevent or delay them from performing such an act. The crime consists in the intent to offer the unfair advantage, regardless whether it actually occurs. It is governed by article 333 of the Penal Code, and is considered a crime against public administration.) money laundering and criminal organization. The operation had the collaboration of a whistleblower who worked with Côrtes in the respective bodies of the Health Department and that the deviations could reach 37 million reals ($9.4 million).

==== Operation Satellites 2 ====
On 27 April 2017, the Federal Police launched the second phase of Operation Satellites, which targeted people linked to politicians who were under investigation by the Supreme Federal Court. (STF). The action only served search and seizure warrants and was supported by information from the Odebrecht–Car Wash plea bargain agreements. One of the targets of the Federal Police action was attorney Bruno Mendes, linked to Senator Renan Calheiros (Brazilian Democratic Movement). The Mendes law practice was subjected to search and seizure warrants. Moreover, the investigations highlighted the trafficking practiced by characters surrounding other politicians of the Brazilian Democratic Movement (PMDB) in Alagoas, Tocantins, Maranhão, Rio Grande do Norte, Sergipe and Roraima. Among the targets was attorney Amaury Cezar Piccolo, identified as being close to José Sarney. People connected to Romero Jucá and Garibaldi Alves were also on the list of judicial warrants served earlier.

==== Operation Patmos ====
On 18 May 2017, the Federal Police and the Federal Public Prosecution Service carried out search and seizure warrants at properties linked to Senator Aécio Neves in Rio de Janeiro, the Federal District and Minas Gerais, and at his office in Congress. The agents also served an arrest warrant for his sister, Andrea Neves, at her home. The warrants were issued by Minister Edson Fachin as a result of testimony given by brothers Joesley and Wesley Batista, owners of JBS S.A., in return for prosecutorial leniency. Fachin also ordered the senator's seat in the Senate revoked. The operation served a warrant of pre-trial detention against Eduardo Cunha (PMDB-RJ), in the Medical-Penal Complex (CMP) in Curitiba where he is serving a sentence for his conviction in Operation Car Wash.

In 2017 Aécio appeared again in other whistle-blowing agreements. The executives said JBS paid Neves 80 million reals ($20 million) in illegal campaign funding as well as two million more recently to support a new "abuse of authority" law to make it easier for suspects and defendants to sue investigators, prosecutors and judges. Neves was recorded asking for the 2 million reals ($0.51 million) from Joesley Batista, chairman of meatpacking company JBS SA. Batista told the authorities that Neves implied that the money would be used to pay for his defence in the Lava Jato (Carwash) investigations but the money never went to his lawyers. Instead, part of the money, received by the senator's cousin, ended up in a company owned by Zezé Perrella, an old friend of Aécio who was also implicated in the biggest drug traffic scandal in Brazilian History.

==== Operation Back on Track ====
On 25 May 2017, the Federal Police and the Federal Public Ministry launched an operation, called Back on Track (Operação de Volta aos Trilhos), against money laundering involving bribes in the construction of the North-South Railway of Brazil. According to the authorities, the operation has carried out two temporary arrests, seven search and seizure warrants and four condução coercitiva warrants in Goiás and Mato Grosso. The operation was based on colaboração premiada agreements between the Public Ministry and the civil engineering conglomerates Camargo Corrêa and Andrade Gutierrez, who admitted they paid bribes to Juquinha das Nevez, former president of Valec. Furthermore, the operation was based on investigations by the Federal Police, which discovered the identification and location of part of the illicit assets kept hidden in the name of others. The administrative-improbity lawsuits relating to the North–South Railway works were later dismissed on the merits in 2025, with the Federal Justice in Goiás recognising the absence of any causal link to illicit enrichment and the lack of proof of overpricing (a 2021 court-appointed expert examination having found no overpricing).

==== Operation Ratatouille ====
On 1 June 2017, Federal Police agents arrested businessman Marco Antônio de Luca, linked to the food companies "Masan", and "Milano", which belong to the same family group and are among the main suppliers of food and snacks to the State of Rio de Janeiro. Search and seizure warrants were also served at several addresses in another offshoot of Operation Car Wash in the state. Masan had several food supply contracts with the government of the state of Rio de Janeiro and received about R$700 million ($200 million) over the previous ten years. During the current governor's administration alone Luiz Fernando Pezão the amount reached R$200 million ($51 million). According to investigations, Marco de Luca paid at least R$12.5 million ($3.2 million) in kickbacks to the criminal organization led by Cabral to win these contracts. Hospital, school and prison feeding contracts were investigated. MPF said it would also investigate the Rio-2016 Organizing Committee and its contracts with Masan. Rio-2016 signed at least six contracts with the company in the areas of conservation, cleaning, waste management, food and hospitality.

==== Operation Hidden Figure ====
On 1 June 2017, the Federal Police carried out Operation Hidden Figure, to investigate electoral crimes and money laundering during the 2012 campaign of Fernando Haddad for Mayor of São Paulo. It is one of the offshoots of Operation Car Wash, which began in 2015, after the Supreme Federal Court spun off the plea deal (delação premiada) of executives of the company UTC Engenharia. The inquest examined the payment of debts by the contractor related to one of the slates of candidates in the campaign for the 2012 São Paulo municipal elections, regarding graphic services in the amount of R$2.6 million ($660 thousand). According to the Police, the debt was allegedly paid through a money exchanger (doleiro (Note: Doleiro – A money dealer; black-market money dealer; literally, "dollar-er" ("dollar-dealer"). Someone who buys and sells dollars on the gray market. They also transfer funds between countries on behalf of companies or individuals not authorized by the Central Bank of Brazil to perform exchange operations, or which are outside the official mechanisms of registration and control. While this may be legal in some contexts, in others it is an indicator of possible money laundering or tax evasion activities. In this context, a doleiro is someone who converts currencies without authorization, or beyond the limits allowed by law. See also: Dólar-cabo.)) in bank transfers and cash, to companies. A company mentioned in the list appears as a service provider, with reported amounts of R$354,450 ($89,859). However, in the accountability to Superior Electoral Court (TSE), another contract for provision of graphic services amounted to R$252,900 ($64,110), amounts well below the sum of R$2,600,000 ($660,000), which were allegedly paid by contractor UTC Engineering to the printers.

==== Operation Manus ====
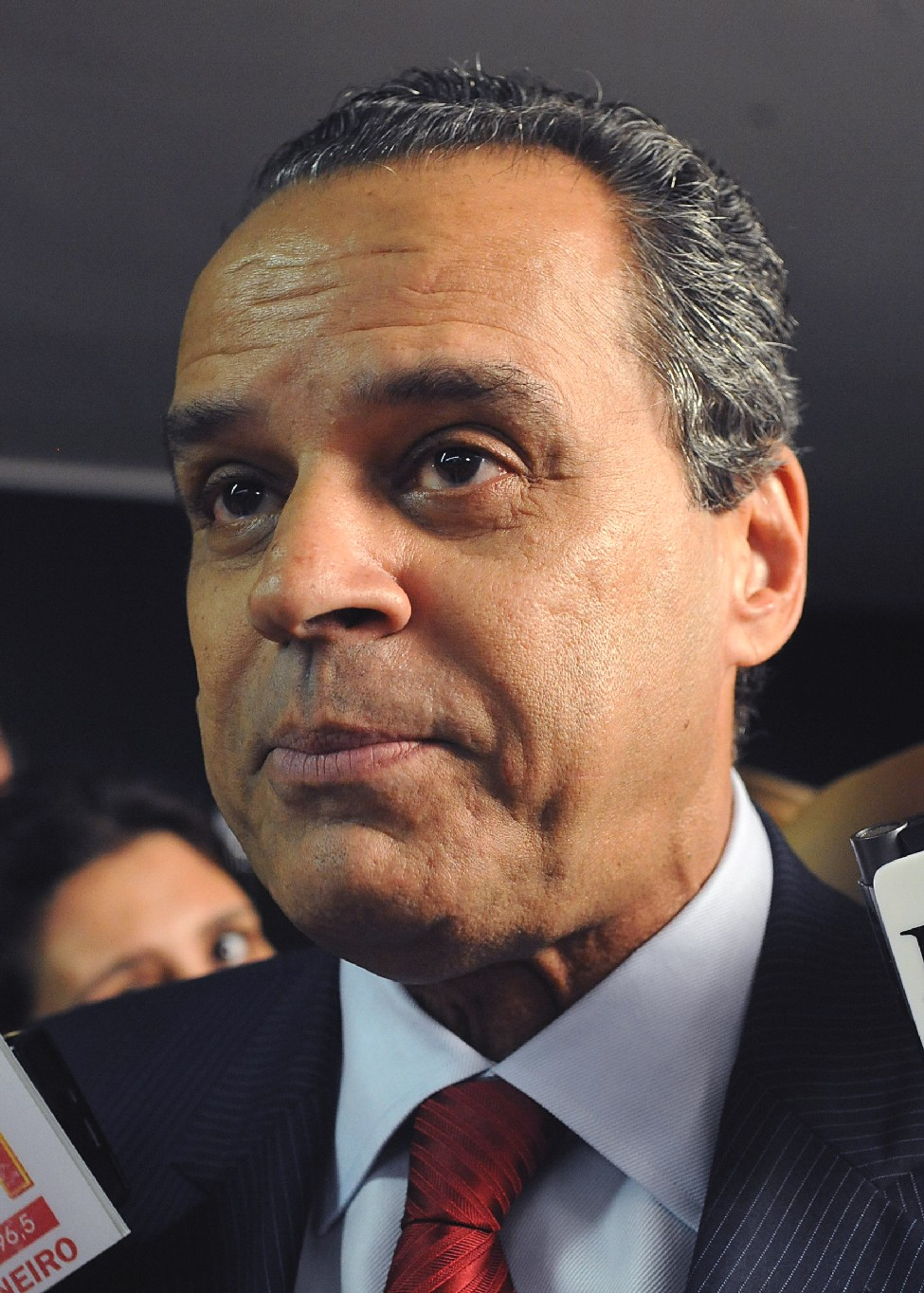
Henrique Alves was arrested in Operation Manus

On 6 June 2017, the Federal Police arrested former Minister of Tourism Henrique Eduardo Alves. Former Deputy Eduardo Cunha, already in prison in Curitiba, was the target of a new warrant. Both men are from the PMDB and had been president of the Chamber of Deputies. The operation investigated active and passive corruption and money laundering in the construction of Arena das Dunas in Natal, Rio Grande do Norte with a surcharge that reached $77 million. Thirty-three warrants were served, five for pre-trial detention, six condução coercitiva warrants and 22 for search and seizure in Rio Grande do Norte and Paraná. According to the Federal Police, bribes were identified through official donations between 2012 and 2014, as well as donations to the 2014 campaign for personal benefit.

==== Operation Baron Crook ====
On 8 June 2017, the Civil Police of Rio de Janeiro State (PCERJ) performed a major operation to investigate crimes of corruption and money laundering in the regional power utility Eletrobrás Furnas. Twenty-five search and seizure warrants were served at the company's headquarters in Botafogo and at other addresses involving management positions at companies contracted by the utility. Another eight search and seizure warrants were served in São Paulo. In addition, there were two condução coercitiva warrants, one of which was against former director Dimas Fernando Toledo. The operation is an offshoot of Operation Car Wash which grew out of the report of Delcídio Amaral. In Rio de Janeiro, the operation was coordinated by the Finance Police (Delegacia Fazendária (Delfaz) (Note: Specialized Police (Delegacia especializada) – a type of police precinct or station that is tied not to a particular locale, but rather to a special sphere of activity. Some of these specialized precincts are those devoted to narcotics, cybercrime, child protection and others.)), with the support of fifteen specialized precincts of the DGPE, the Anticorruption Coordination Unit of the Laboratory for Technology and Money Laundering of PCERJ, and the Civil Police of the State of São Paulo.

==== Operation End Point ====
On 3 July 2017, a new operation (End Point; Ponto Final) served nine pre-trial and three temporary arrest warrants, as well as 30 search and seizure warrants against the Rio de Janeiro state road transport leadership. The action was based on the depositions, in return for sentence reduction, of former State Court of Justice Jonas Lopes de Carvalho Filho, and money changer and operator Álvaro Novis from Operation Efficiency. Lopes had been sentenced to seven years of house arrest, community service and probation as part of Operation Fifth of Gold, in which five of seven ministers of the Tribunal de Contas da Tribunal do Estado (TCE) were charged with corruption.

The operation investigated bribes from bus entrepreneurs to politicians and transport inspectors in Rio de Janeiro, pointing out that former governor Sérgio Cabral Filho received $122.85 million through his right hand operative, Carlos Miranda. On 13 June 2017, he was sentenced to 14 years and two months of imprisonment for passive corruption and money laundering. On 20 September 2017 he was sentenced to an additional 45 years imprisonment for embezzlement. In total, around R$260 million were paid in bribes in exchange for benefits to bus companies, such as approval for "fare adjustments". Also arrested were Lélis Teixeira, president of the Federation of Passenger Transport Companies of the State of Rio de Janeiro (Fetransport), Rogério Onofre, former president of the Department of Road Transport of Rio de Janeiro (DETRO) and the entrepreneur heading the Grupo Guanabara, Jacob Barata. Known as "King of the Bus", Barata, one of Rio de Janeiro's biggest bus operators, was arrested at Tom Jobim International Airport as he tried to board a plane to Lisbon. Onofre was released in August 2017 by Gilmar Mendes. Bretas arrested him again and he spent 14 months in jail until his release by Bretas in September 2018 with an ankle monitor and instructions not to leave Paraíba do Sul, where he was mayor. In total, the action resulted in the arrest of 10 people linked to public transport in the state for embezzling about R$500 million at the behest of the former governor. On 5 July 2017, PF agents served one condução coercitiva warrant and three for search and seizure.

==== Operation Rio 40 Degrees ====
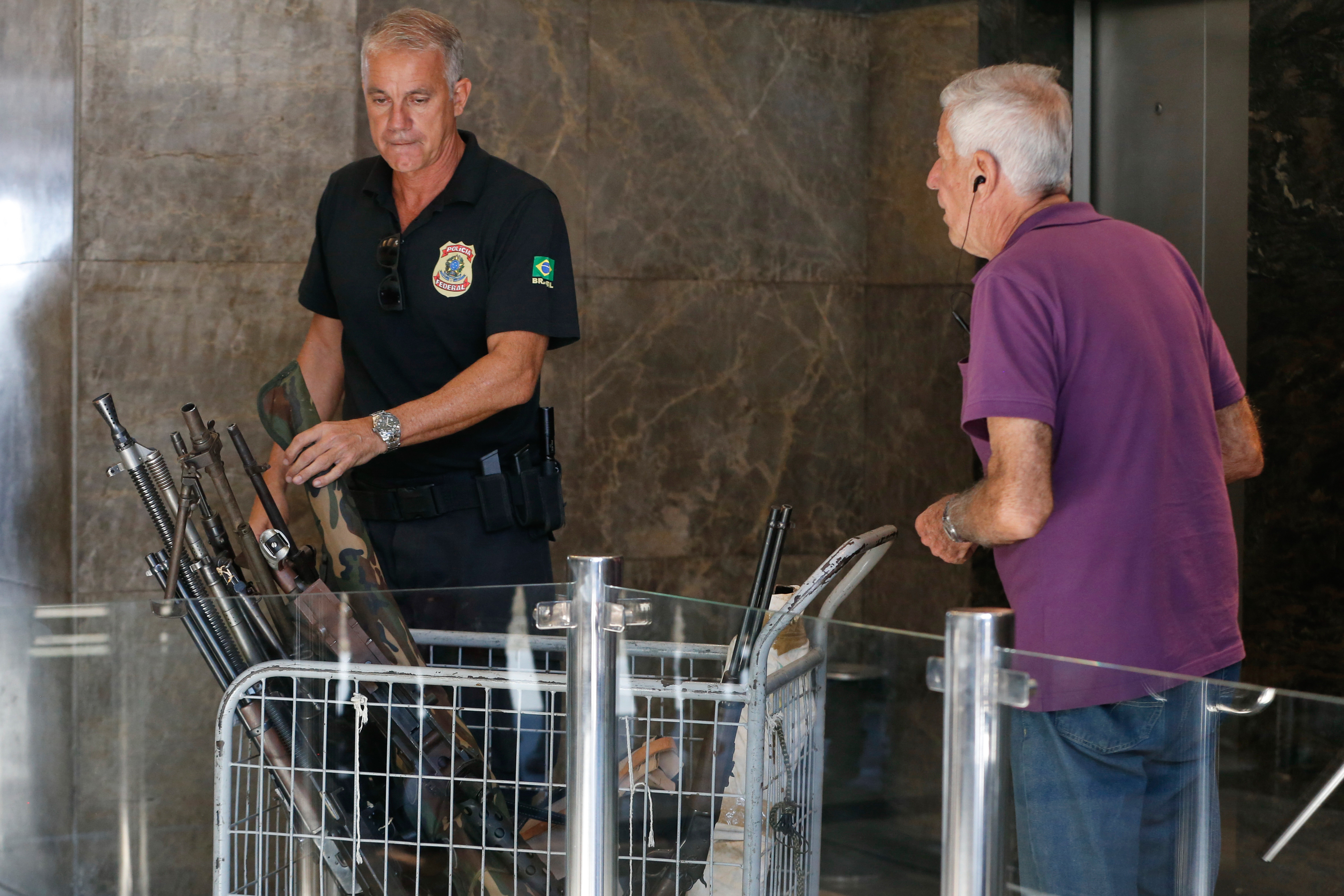
A Federal Police officer confiscating weapons at the home of a city inspector, who had an expired firearms license.

On 3 August 2017, the Federal Police carried out a new operation called Rio 40 Degrees (Note: Rio 40 Degrees – The title refers to the 1956 film (Rio, 40 Graus) (lit. Rio, 40 Degrees; released in English under the title "Rio, 100 Degrees F.") by Nelson Pereira dos Santos. Another of Santos's films (Vidas Secas–Barren Lives) furnished the name for another operation.) that resulted in the arrest of Alexandre Pinto, former municipal Secretary of Public Works for the city of Rio de Janeiro in the administration of Eduardo Paes. The agents served ten arrest warrants, nine of which were in Rio de Janeiro and one in Pernambuco, where the arrest of Laudo Aparecido Dalla Costa Ziani, son-in-law of the former deputy Pedro Corrêa, was confirmed. There was also a condução coercitiva warrant in São Paulo. This new phase of Car Wash reached city hall through contract investigations in the administration of Paes. The MPF prosecutors are based on the corruption complaint against the contractor Carioca Engenharia, involving payment of kickbacks and diversion of funds in the construction of the bus corridor Transcarioca, which cost R$2 billion ($510 million), and the drainage of streams in the Basin of Jacarepaguá. The operation reached Rio City Hall because it began to investigate not only the criminal organization that, according to investigators, was headed by former governor Sérgio Cabral Filho, but also the criminal organization that had links with the Brazilian Democratic Movement (PMDB) throughout the state of Rio de Janeiro. Among the targets of the action were lobbyists and city hall inspectors responsible for the construction. This was the first time that the Rio branch of the Operation Car Wash investigations reached the municipal sector.

==== Operation Gotham City ====
On 9 August 2017, the Federal Police carried out a new operation, in an offshoot of Operation End Point, to arrest two construction entrepreneurs suspected of hiding the assets of the former president of the Rio de Janeiro Department of Road Transport, Rogério Onofre. He was accused of receiving R$43 million ($11,000,000) from bus entrepreneurs. Businessman Nuno Coelho, known as "Batman", was arrested in Curitiba. Guilherme Vialle, "Robin", was already abroad and featured in an Interpol red notice. Both are partners of VCG Empreendimentos Imobiliários and Koios Participações. According to the investigations, Onofre and his wife, Dayse Neves, bought 11 properties that belonged to the businessmen, but declared only 50% of the real cost of the acquisitions in the registry.

==== Operation Unfair Play ====
On 5 September 2017, the Federal Police and the Federal Public Prosecution Service carried out an operation to investigate a vote-buying scheme for the election of Rio de Janeiro as host of the 2016 Olympic Games. The operation involved bribes for Rio de Janeiro government contracts. Two preventive arrest warrants and eleven search and seizure warrants were served in the cities of Rio de Janeiro, Nova Iguaçu (RJ) and Paris, France. The operation involved international cooperation with France and the United States. One of the targets of search and seizure was the president of the Brazilian Olympic Committee (COB), Carlos Arthur Nuzman, investigated for allegedly paying a bribe of US$1.5 million. Bribes were paid in cash, dummy contracts, personal expenses, and money transfer. Those arrested were investigated for corruption, money laundering and organized crime.

On 5 October, in the second phase of Operation Unfair Play, Nuzman was arrested by the Federal Police. According to the Federal Prosecutor's Office (MPF), Nuzman attempted to regularize 16 one-kilo gold bars after the first phase of the operation. Also according to the MPF, over ten years Nuzman's equity grew 457 percent, part of this money going to an offshore tax haven in the British Virgin Islands. Lawyer Nélio Machado, who represents Nuzman, said the arrest "is a harsh measure and is not usual within due process."

==== Operation Lost Treasure ====
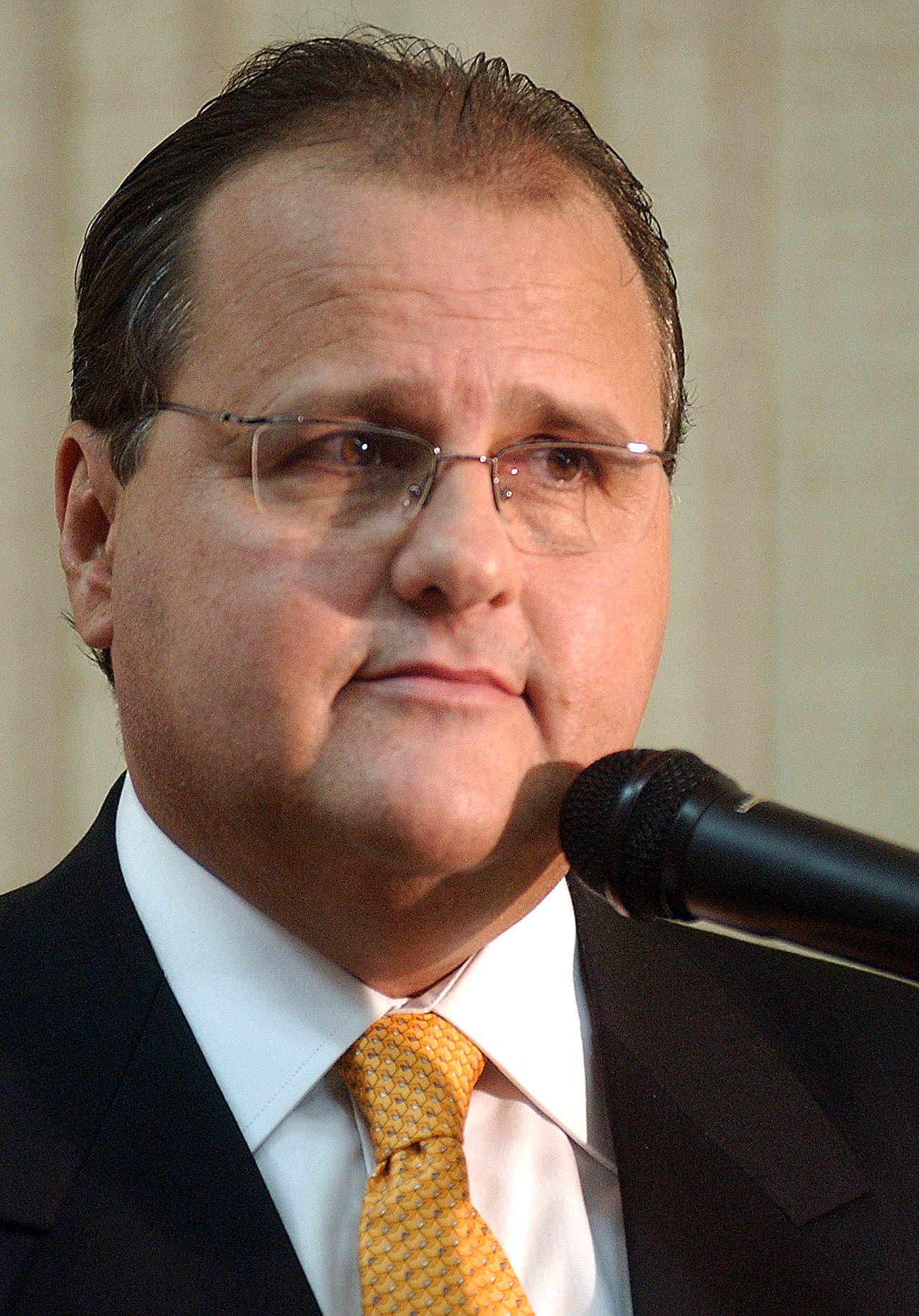
Geddel Vieira Lima arrested in Operation Lost Treasure.

On 5 September 2017, Federal Police carried out the Lost Treasure Operation. It represented the second phase of Cui Bono?, which was an offshoot of Catiline Orations. The target of the operation was an apartment connected to Geddel Vieira Lima. In the operation more than 51 million reals ($13 million) were seized in bags and boxes. The operation was authorized by federal judge Vallisney de Souza Oliveira, who commands Operation Lava Jato in the Federal District. The Federal Police used seven machines to count the money and it took fourteen hours to complete the count.

It was the biggest cash seizure in the history of the country.

==== Operation Old Prison ====
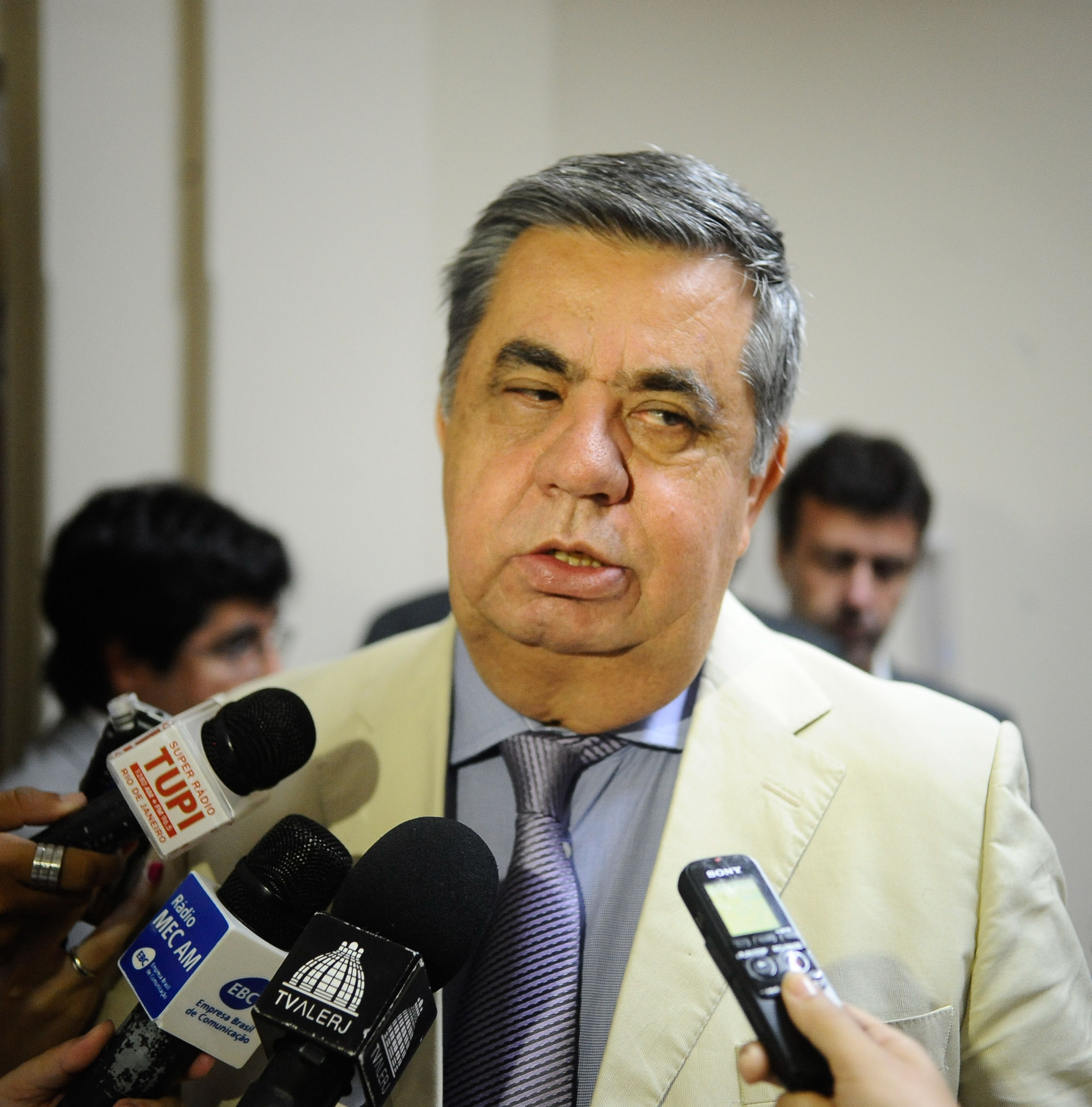
Jorge Picciani arrested in Operation Old Prison.

On 14 November 2017, a new operation resulted in the issuing of a condução coercitiva warrant to state congressman Jorge Picciani, president of the Legislative Assembly of Rio de Janeiro (Alerj). His arrest was decreed by the criminal section of the Federal Regional Court on 16 November 2017, for using his presidency of the Assembly for the practice of corruption, criminal association, money laundering and tax evasion. In concert with Edson Albertassi and Paulo Melo, he is suspected of favoring the interests of businessmen in the state, including representatives of the public transport sector and contractors, in exchange for a bribe.

==== Operation C'est fini ====
On 23 November 2017, in a new offshoot of Operation Car Wash, Federal Police agents in Rio arrested former secretary of the Rio de Janeiro State Civil House Regis Fichtner Velasco, suspected of receiving at least $R1.6 million in bribes He was arrested during Operation C'est fini, accused of receiving 1.6 million reals ($410,000) of bribes linked to the former Rio Governor's corruption schemes. Businessmen and engineers linked to the organization of former governor Sérgio Cabral Filho were also arrested in the operation. Investigations indicated that, while commanding the secretary of the Civil House, Fitchtner Velasco authorized the validation of court orders as a way to offset Imposto Sobre Operações Relativas à Circulação de Mercadorias e Serviços de Transporte Interestadual de Intermunicipal e de Comunicações (ICMS) debts to state debtors. He was allegedly also active in buying bonded securities that were awaiting payment, so that he profited from the premium paid by those who preferred cash before the lawsuit ended.

==== Operation Baixo Augusta ====
On 11 December 2017, the Federal Government, the MPF and the Internal Revenue Service launched operation Baixo Augusta (Note: Baixo Augusta – Named after the São Paulo neighborhood of the same name, located in the Cerqueira César district of the city.) to investigate the payment of R$160 million ($41 million) in bribes to a tax auditor over 14 years to speed up the release of R$2 billion ($510 million) in tax credits to the meat-processing giant JBS S.A., wholly owned by brothers Joesley Batista and Wesley Batista. The auditor was removed by the court and eight individuals and companies had their assets frozen on suspicion of involvement in the scheme. In all, 14 search and seizure warrants were served in the operation. Investigations showed that the tax auditor received large amounts of money to illicitly expedite the release of funds that the company allegedly received from the Department of Federal Revenue as tax credits. According to the Federal Police, there are indications that the corruption scheme went on for more than a decade, from 2004 to 2017, and transactions took place via front companies and the issuance of fake receipts.

=== 2018 ===
==== Operation Jabuti ====
On 23 February 2018, Rio de Janeiro's Federal Police and the Federal Public Ministry arrested Orlando Diniz, president of the Rio de Janeiro State Trade Federation (National Confederation of Trade in Goods, Services and Tourism; Fecomercio-RJ). He was arrested on suspicion of money laundering, corruption and membership in a criminal organization. Among the irregularities investigated was the hiring of phantom employees by Sesc and Senac, who received salaries from the firms. The exact number of phantom employees was not yet known, and at least one of them was formally linked to the Sesc/Senac payroll until 2017. According to the investigation, the phantom hires were made at the request of Sérgio Cabral Filho and helped the former governor to increase the kickback that was regularly distributed to his closest operators and his relatives, in a scheme that moved more than R$7.5 million ($1.9 million). The president of Fecomercio-RJ also spent R$180 million ($46 million) over four years with law firms on contracts that circumvented the technical and transparency standards of the agencies under his responsibility. The suspicion is that he used public money to defend himself and remain in control of these firms.

==== Operation Descarte ====
On 1 March 2018, the Federal Police and Department of Federal Revenue served search and seizure warrants in an operation that was an offshoot of Operation Car Wash in São Paulo and Minas Gerais. The goal of the new operation was to dismantle a scheme of criminal money laundering and embezzlement of funds paid by municipal governments for street cleaning. According to Federal Revenue, the criminal organization issued more than R$900 million ($2,500,000) in invoices with indications of fraud. The police stated that the companies participating in the scheme simulated the sale of goods to the customer of the laundering "service", which then paid for non-existent products via bank transfers or slips (to give the appearance of legality to the acquisition). The sums received were transferred to several other shell companies that remitted the amounts abroad or made transfers to persons connected with the initial customer. In total, according to the police, more than R$120 million ($30,000,000) was passed on to as yet unidentified third parties. The investigation grew out of the denunciation of black market money changer Alberto Youssef. The warrants were issued by the 2nd Federal Criminal Court.

==== Operation Our Bread ====
On 13 March 2018, the Federal and State Public Prosecution Service of Rio de Janeiro carried out a new operation against corruption in the Rio penitentiary system, which grew out of Operation Calicute, a version of Operation Car Wash in the State of Rio de Janeiro. The operation resulted in the arrest of Deputy Marcelo Luiz Santos Martins, director of the General Department of Specialized Police in Rio de Janeiro, and Military Police Colonel Cesar Rubens Monteiro de Carvalho, former State Secretary of Penitentiary Administration (Seap). Under the Federal Prosecutor's Office, the operation served fourteen arrest warrants (nine temporary and five preventive); at the state level, there were nine arrests (with names repeated in both). The targets of the investigation were accused of being part of a criminal organization that rigged food supply contracts (take-out, breakfast, and snacks) for at least six years (2009–2014) for the state's more than 50,000 prisoners, always keeping the same suppliers, who shared in the profits of the scheme. The contracts totaled R$72 million ($18,000,000) during that period.

==== Operation Skala ====
On 29 March 2018, the Federal Police in São Paulo arrested the lawyer José Yunes, friend and former advisor of President Michel Temer and, in Monte Alegre do Sul (SP), the businessman Antonio Celso Greco, owner of the company Rodrimar, which operates in Port of Santos. The prisons are part of the operation launched in São Paulo and Rio de Janeiro. Also arrested in the same operation was the former Minister of Agriculture and former Federal Deputy Wagner Rossi, who was the CEO of the São Paulo State Dock Company, which administered the port. Yunes was named by financial operator Lúcio Funaro, whistle-blower for Operation Car Wash, as one of those responsible for handling bribes allegedly paid to the president. According to Funaro, to launder the money and disguise the origin, Yunes invested illicit funds with his real estate developer. The operation was authorized by Supreme Federal Court Minister Luís Roberto Barroso, rapporteur of the inquiry investigating whether Temer accepted bribes in order to benefit companies in the port sector.

==== Operation against ex-director of Dersa ====
On 6 April 2018, the Federal Police served preventive arrest warrants against Paulo Vieira de Souza, Paulo Preto, former Brazilian Social Democracy Party (PSDB) operative and former director of the Department of Road Development SA (Dersa), who was charged with misappropriation of funds, in kind and in real estate. The MP denounced Paulo Preto for crimes of racketeering, embezzlement and insertion of false data in the public information system. The former director had already been cited by whistle blowers as a possible PSDB kickback operative in the state of São Paulo. According to the complaint, Souza and the others investigated diverted 7.7 million reals ($2.0 million) from the Dersa coffers, money intended for families displaced due to construction done in the state between 2009 and 2011. The governors of São Paulo at the time were: José Serra (2007 to 2010), Alberto Goldman (2010) and Geraldo Alckmin (since 2011). Paulo Preto led Dersa between 2007 and 2010.

==== Operation Instant Replay ====
On 10 April 2018, the Federal Police launched a new operation that investigated payments of "undue advantage" by a business group to politicians. Judicial warrants were served in São Paulo, Goiânia, and Fortaleza. The operation was launched by the ex-director of institutional relations of Hypermarcas Nelson Melo in Operation Car Wash. In it, Melo said he gave R$5 million ($1,300,000) to the campaign of the Senate President, Eunício Oliveira (MDB-CE), to the Ceará government in 2014, through fictitious contracts. It is suspected that the politician committed the crimes of passive corruption and money laundering. Beyond just this denunciation, the investigators based their actions on the revelations made by a businesswoman from Salvador, wife of the marketer of the Eunício Oliveira campaign in 2014. She confessed that at her husband's request, she received money without performing any service. The appeals were passed on not only by Hypermarcas and JBS S.A., who already admitted the irregularities to the Public Prosecution Service, but also by the Ceará company M. Dias Branco.

==== Operation Rhizome ====
On 12 April 2018, agents of the Federal Police and the Federal Public Ministry arrested businessman Arthur Mário Pinheiro Machado in an operation that investigated pension fund fraud. In all, the officers served 10 pre-trial detention and 21 arrest warrants in Rio de Janeiro, São Paulo and Brasília against suspects of defrauding the pension funds Postalis (of the Post Office) and the Federal Data Processing Service (Serpro). According to the investigation, the funds sent money to companies abroad to pay for non-existent services. The money was scattered among different dollar accounts and then returned to Brazil for bribes. The scheme worked through two black marketeers of the former governor Sérgio Cabral Filho, who helped bring cash back into the country. Another arrested trader was Milton Lyra, who is named in several investigations as an MDB operator in the Senate and in various schemes. The operation investigates money laundering, currency evasion and corruption crimes through fraud that has caused major damage to funds. It is an outgrowth of operations Efficiency and Unfair Play.

==== Operation against Progressive Party federal legislators ====
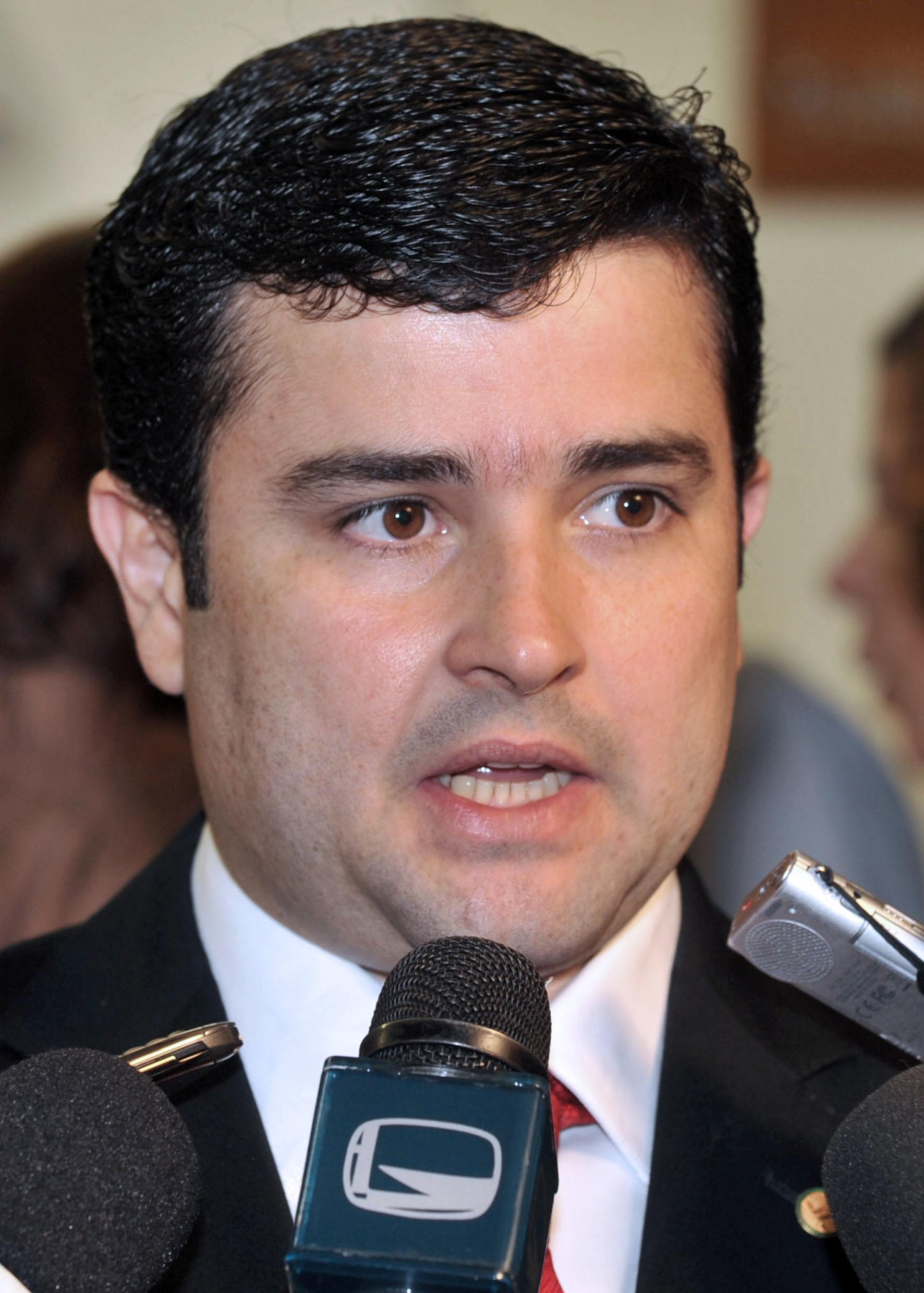
Eduardo da Fonte speaks to the media.

On 24 April 2018, the Federal Police served a warrant to search the offices and also the executive apartments (Apartamentos funcionais) (Note: Apartamentos funcionais – (lit. "Functionary apartments") a set of executive apartments set aside in the capital, Brasília, by the government for the use of members of the Chamber of Deputies while they are in the capital.) of Representative Eduardo da Fonte. (Progressive Party (PP)-Pernambuco) and senator Ciro Nogueira (PP-Piauí), national president of the Progressive Party. The warrant was authorized by Minister Edson Fachin, rapporteur of the Car Wash cases in the STF. The operation was launched in conjunction with the Prosecutor General. The police also served a warrant of arrest against former deputy Márcio Junqueira of Roraima, who was arrested in Brasília. The investigations revealed an attempt by congressmen to buy the silence of a former adviser to the senator who had been collaborating with the judiciary. The advisor detailed that he received the payment in cash, and was passed the money by the former deputy. According to investigators, the former advisor was in collaboration with several investigations in connection with Operation Car Wash, and was allegedly threatened with death. Due to the threats, he was included in the witness protection program. The Police served eight search and seizure warrants, all at addresses linked to the three targets of the operation.

==== Operation Over and out ====
On 3 May 2018, a new operation code-named "Operation Over and out" (Operação Câmbio, Desligo) served 49 pre-trial (preventive detention) and four temporary arrest warrants in the states of Rio de Janeiro, São Paulo, Minas Gerais, Rio Grande do Sul, and the Federal District, as well as Paraguay and Uruguay. The main target was Darío Messer, who has been called the most influential money changer in the country. Messer is also a Paraguayan citizen. The operation was supported by Uruguayan authorities and aimed to dismantle a money laundering, currency evasion and organized crime network. The suspects were part of a system called Bank Drop, in which moneymakers remitted funds abroad through illegal dollar wire transfers known as dólar-cabo, (Note: Dólar-cabo – an illegal dollar wire transfer. A neologism in Portuguese, no stable English equivalent exists, but cable-dollar and other terms have been proposed. This is the practice of trading dollars in the gray market for deposit in a financial institution abroad. This may or may not involve actual cross-border transfers of money. It typically involves the services of a doleiro and intermediaries abroad. The practice is a crime under article 22 of Lei dos Crimes contra o Sistema Financeiro. It is often used in money laundering schemes to expatriate or repatriate funds.) a method in which money does not pass through central bank-regulated financial institutions. According to police, some 3,000 offshore companies in 52 tax haven countries handled about $1.6 billion (or $5.6 billion by 2018).

==== Operation Stone in the way ====
São Paulo's regional beltway, the Rodoanel Mário Covas.

On 21 June 2018, the Federal Police carried out a new operation in São Paulo with an investigation that found irregularities in construction of the northern section of the ring road, from the conclusion of contractual additions and consequent increases to the total cost. According to the Federal Public Ministry (MPF) and estimates by the Federal Court of Accounts (TCU) pointed to an overrun of more than 600 million reals ($150 million) in the cost of the construction. Of the 15 temporary arrest warrants in the Federal Police lawsuit, one targeted Laurence Lourenço Casagrande, former president of Dersa (Note: Dersa – highway construction and maintenance enterprise controlled by the São Paulo State government.) and former secretary of logistics and transport under the former governor Geraldo Alckmin (PSDB), and current president of the Companhia Energética de São Paulo (Cesp), a state government power company for São Paulo State. Lourenço was already investigated for these additions and also by the irregular subcontracting of other companies. The judge held him preventively at prosecutors' request. In addition, other targets of the operation included other former directors of Dersa, construction companies Grupo OAS and Mendes Júnior, companies responsible for the construction, and contract managers under suspicion. In addition to the arrest warrants, 51 search and seizure orders were served.

==== Operation Resonance ====
On 4 July 2018, in an offshoot of Operation Exposed Invoice regarding a corruption scheme in Rio's public health system, the Car Wash task force returned to the streets to arrest businessman Miguel Iskin, his partner Gustavo Estellita and 20 other people, in addition to the search and seizure executed at 44 addresses in Rio de Janeiro, São Paulo, Paraíba, Minas Gerais and the Federal District. They also decreed the freezing of the assets of those under investigation in the amount of R$1.2 billion {$300 million). The operation then targeted companies involved in the scheme of cartelization and embezzlement of money in the provision of prosthetics and medical equipment by means of fraudulent bids in the so-called "international trading floor club" headed by Iskin. A cartel of suppliers was identified which was active between 1996 and 2017 at the National Institute of Traumatology and Orthopedics (INTO). They also served arrest warrants on the director general of INTO, André Loyelo, and on two executives of Philips Brazil, one of the 37 companies involved in the scheme and accused of the crimes of cartel formation, corruption, bid rigging, criminal organization, and money laundering.

==== Operation Hashtag ====
On 3 August 2018, the Federal Police (MPF) began a new operation, against money laundering suspects allegedly linked to former Governor Sérgio Cabral Filho, as an offshoot of Operation Efficiency. Banker Eduardo Plass was suspected of using offshore companies and a Rio South Zone jewelry store to launder bribe money. The businessman and two of his minority partners were the subject of temporary arrest warrants, and there were also four arrest warrants. He and the two partners are suspected of transferring about 90 million reals ($23 million) in the scheme. Plass was president of Banco Pactual and a majority shareholder of TAG Bank in Panama, and the asset manager OPUS. Police investigations pointed to money laundering and currency evasion crimes led by Eduardo Plass. Former billionaire Eike Batista was arrested based on information given by Plass, then released back to the house arrest where he had already been since 2017. The scheme consisted of receiving cash from the Ipanema jewelry directors, and then transferring funds abroad from an account under their control to an offshore shell company and transferring the amounts to the jewelry group holding company.

==== Operation S.O.S. ====
On 31 August 2018, federal agents served twenty preventive custody warrants and one temporary arrest warrant in the states of Rio de Janeiro and São Paulo. Sérgio Côrtes, former Secretary of Health in the Sérgio Cabral Filho governorship, was arrested again, in addition to businessmen Miguel Iskin and Gustavo Estellita. This time, the operation involved Social Organizations, which are non-profit organizations hired to manage healthcare facilities in the state. The target of the operation was Pró-Saúde, which administered several hospitals under Sérgio Cabral Filho's management, such as Getúlio Vargas, Albert Schweitzer, Adão Pereira Nunes and Alberto Torres. The operation was an offshoot of the Exposed Invoice and Resonance operations and is the third phase of Car Wash in Rio de Janeiro in the health sector. According to investigators, the fraudulent contracts led to the embezzlement of about 74 million reals ($19 million) from the public coffer.

==== Operation Marakata ====
Operation Marakata is an offshoot of Operation Over and out involving illegal trade in precious stones, and money laundering. On 4 September 2018, the Federal Police served nine court orders, three of which were for pre-trial detention and six for search and seizure, investigating an illegal scheme of trade in emeralds and other precious and semiprecious stones, capital flight, and money laundering by the former governor Sérgio Cabral Filho in Rio de Janeiro and in Bahia. The operation revealed the comprehensive and detailed business network of Dario Messer, the master money changer (o doleiro dos doleiros), whose parallel compensation system reconciled the interests of clients of different black market money changers (transactions were made beyond the reach of authorities in order to launder income from corruption, tax evasion and other crimes). Among the targets of the operation were managing partners who buy precious stones from gold mines in Bahia and export them to Indian businessmen using fake invoices and bills of sale.

=== 2019 ===
==== Operation Decontamination ====
Operation Decontamination is a break-up of operations Radioactivity, Pripyat, and Brotherhood of the Car Wash investigation. It was launched on 21 March 2019 by Federal Police, which investigated crimes of corruption, embezzlement (peculato (Note: Peculato – embezzlement. There are other words in Portuguese that are commonly used to mean embezzlement more generally, including: desvio (diversion), malversação (misappropriation), desfalque (embezzlement), and others. The term peculato is used specifically to mean embezzlement by a public official in an abuse of public trust for their own benefit or someone else's. It is one of several crimes that is considered a "crime against public administration". It is governed by Penal Code Article 312.)) and money laundering. It focused on investigating diversion of funds on the order of 1.8 billion reals ($460 million) in the Angra 3 nuclear power plant construction project.

The break-up is the result of an investigation that began under the auspices of the Attorney General's Office during the time when Michel Temer was still president. After finishing his term and losing his foro privilegiado status, the dossier was then sent to the Car Wash task force, which is based in Rio de Janeiro. This operation led to, among other things, the arrest of Temer.

==== Operation Patron ====
Federal police announced Operation Patron on 19 November 2019. Thirty-seven court orders were issued by the 7th Federal Criminal Court of Rio de Janeiro, in the City of Rio de Janeiro, in Armação dos Búzios, Greater São Paulo and in Ponta Pora, Mato Grosso do Sul. Because some targets lived in Paraguay and the United States of America an Interpol red notice was authorized by the courts. In November 2019 a Brazilian court withdrew the arrest warrant against former president of Paraguay Horacio Cartes.

==== Operation Jaguar's Den ====
Federal Police launched Operation Jaguar's Den on 8 November 2018. The Federal Regional Court of Region 2 (TRF-2) initially served 19 warrants for temporary arrest, three for pre-trial detention, and 47 for search and seizure. The action, which was an offshoot of Operation Lava Jato in the state of Rio de Janeiro, had the participation of 200 federal police officers, 35 members of the Ministério Público Federal and ten auditors of Department of Federal Revenue.

The goal of the operation was to investigate the participation of state deputies of Rio de Janeiro State in a scheme of corruption, money laundering, biased hiring, and labor outsourcing in the administration of the State of Rio de Janeiro. According to Miranda, a group of congressmen received a monthly stipend from the political group of Sérgio Cabral Filho in exchange for parliamentary support, which ranged from R$20,000 to R$100,000 ($5,100 to $25,000).

The operation was named after a conference room in RJ State Assembly, where members would sometimes adjourn and have heated conversations, which gained it the nickname, the "Jaguar's Den".

On 14 December 2018, the Federal Public Ministry (MPF) filed a complaint against 29 persons suspected of corruption, money laundering, and criminal organization in Federal Regional Court of Region 2 (TRF-2), based on the investigations of Operation Jaguar's Den. Among those indicted were the ten state congressmen targeted by the operation, the former governor of Rio de Janeiro Sérgio Cabral Filho, former state secretaries, advisors to the Legislative Assembly of Rio de Janeiro (Alerj), and managers of the Traffic Department of the State of Rio de Janeiro (Detran-RJ).

=== 2020 ===
==== Operation Puppeteer ====
Operation Puppeteer (Tireteiro) was launched 5 March 2020. The operation led to the arrest of the former national secretary of justice Astério Pereira dos Santos, who was suspected of involvement in a scheme to pay kickbacks to members of the Rio de Janeiro State Court of Auditors (TCE-RJ). The Portuguese name of the operation, Titereiro, is a reference to a puppeteer that controls marionettes, only moving the strings, without ever appearing in view. According to the prosecutors, this was Astério's function in the criminal organization.

==== Operation Favorite ====
On 14 May 2020, the Federal Police launched a new phase of Car Wash, baptized Operation Favorite, in Rio de Janeiro, with the arrest of former state representative Paulo Melo, businessman Mário Peixoto and three other people, with indications that the businessman's group was interested in doing business in field hospitals, during the COVID-19 pandemic in Brazil. 1.5 million reals were seized at the home of one of the targets of the investigation. The targets were allegedly the units set up by the state (with public money) in Maracanã, São Gonçalo, Duque de Caxias, Nova Iguaçu, Campos, and Casimiro de Abreu. The criminal organization allegedly embezzled health care funds, in collusion with state audit court advisors, state deputies, and other public officials.

==== Operation Let There Be Light ====
On 25 June 2020, the Federal Police launched Operation Let There Be Light (Fiat Lux), which investigated bribery at Eletrobras. Among those under investigation was Silas Rondeau, former Minister of Mines and Energy in Lula's government. Twelve arrest warrants were issued in the operation, and eighteen search and seizure warrants were served in Rio de Janeiro, São Paulo and Brasília.

== Abroad ==
Car Wash operations outside Brazil began after Odebrecht S.A. and Braskem admitted in a leniency agreement filed with the US Department of Justice that they paid bribes abroad totaling more than one billion dollars. During the investigations of Operation Car Wash, whistle blowers reported crimes in several other countries in Europe, Africa and the Americas.

According to experts, four principles allowed corruption schemes to spread in Latin America and around the world: the privileges granted to companies in Brazil; presidential diplomacy of the Lula administration which facilitated the operations of these companies abroad; allocation of funds from the Brazilian Development Bank for projects involving Brazilian contractors abroad; and the actions of marketers as intermediaries.

- Angola – The Brazilian Development Bank (BNDES) said it would internally investigate allegations made by Odebrecht whistleblowers regarding favoring the company in Angola and hiring a consultancy for R$12 million ($3,000,000) at the request of Luiz Eduardo Melin de Carvalho, then chief of staff of the then Minister of Finance, Guido Mantega. Melin had previously been the international and foreign trade director at BNDES. Another inquiry was to investigate the testimony of Emilio Odebrecht, who said he had asked former President Lula to use his influence to get Odebrecht favorable treatment in the country.
- Antigua and Barbuda – Brazilian businessmen said they used third parties to acquire a subsidiary of Viennese Meinl Bank in Antigua and Barbuda to facilitate the concealment of illegal transfers that could reach US$1.6 billion. The executives were linked to Odebrecht and the brewery company Grupo Petrópolis. The information was made public in June 2016, during Operation Xepa, the 26th phase of Operation Car Wash.
- Argentina – Odebrecht made illicit payments of US$35 million to intermediaries linked to at least three infrastructure projects between 2007 and 2014 under the government of Cristina Kirchner.
- Chile – Publicist Duda Mendonça said in an award-winning accusation that Brazilian contractor OAS funded the Michelle Bachelet presidential campaign in 2013. She governed Chile from 2006 to 2010 and again from 2014 to 2018. Now United Nations High Commissioner for Human Rights, Bechelet denies any ties to OAS. Also in the 2013 campaign, the contractor allegedly loaned an executive jet to another candidate, the defeated Marco Enríquez Ominami, to travel the country.
- Colombia – The contractor spent about US$11 million on middlemen between 2009 and 2014, even involving the name of President Juan Manuel Santos, who won the Nobel Peace Prize in 2016. Senator Otto Bula, arrested 14 January was accused of receiving US$4.6 million in bribes to award the Brazilians a no-bid contract to build the Ocaña-Gamarra freeway.
- Cuba – Marcelo Odebrecht revealed, in a deposition given in exchange for a reduced sentence, that former President Lula and Minas Governor Fernando Pimentel (PT-MG) acted politically to make it possible for the group to obtain contracts for work at the Port of Mariel, Cuba. Lula was already being investigated for influence peddling involving the contracts. The venture was budgeted at US$957 million, of which US$682 million came from the Brazilian Development Bank. [24]
- Dominican Republic – According to the US Justice Department, bribery was practiced over 13 years from 2001 to 2014. Odebrecht is still under investigation for paying US$92 million in bribes to public officials in the Dominican Republic in this period. In January, the construction company's general manager in the Dominican Republic was questioned by the country's Attorney General. The period investigated covers the terms of three presidents: Hipólito Mejía (2000–2004), Leonel Fernández (2004–2012) and Danilo Medina (2012–2020).
- El Salvador – Odebrecht says it paid $5.3 million to bankroll two election campaigns for presidential candidate Mauricio Funes, elected in 2009. The payment was allegedly made in 2008 to marketer João Santana, who ran Funes' campaign that year. In February 2016 Funes became a defendant before the country's Supreme Court for not justifying personal transactions of over US$600,000. Seven months later, the Nicaraguan government granted Funes political asylum, finding him persecuted as a politician. The case has not yet been tried. (see also: Operation Acarajé)
- Ecuador – Bribes were allegedly paid over a decade between 2007 and 2016 in exchange for preferential treatment on construction projects in the country. Odebrecht executives said they gave over US$33.5 million to Ecuadorian politicians during this period.
- Guatemala – Odebrecht's operations in the country took place between 2013 and 2015, with estimated expenses of US$18 million in bribes. Guatemalan Attorney General Thelma Aldana said she would seek the collaboration of the United States Department of Justice and the Attorney General of Brazil to investigate the payment of bribes to the country's civil servants during the term of former president Otto Pérez Molina, arrested in 2015, accused of pocketing more than 50 percent of all customs revenue in the country.
- Mexico – Between 2010 and 2014, the Brazilian contractor paid a total of US$10.5 million to intermediaries in the country. The payment was confirmed by Odebrecht executives in testimony given in exchange for a sentence reduction from the US Department of Justice.
- Mozambique – Since July 2015, Brazil and Mozambique have exchanged information on corruption involving Brazilian contractors in the African country. In January 2016, Época magazine published a report stating that the Brazilian government authorized the Brazilian Development Bank (BNDES) to provide loans to the Mozambican government to build the Moamba Major dam on the condition that the contractor was Andrade Gutierrez.
- Norway – MP Norway also investigated bribes on the order of R$140 million ($35,000,000) by its companies to former directors of Petrobras. Former employees of the Brazilian state-owned company were suspected of resorting to intermediaries of Scandinavian companies to supply accounts with money from bribes paid to their former directors, political agents and authorities in Brazil, in a collusion and diversion scheme. At the center of the investigation between Norway and Brazil was Sevan Drilling – a company specialized in offshore oil exploration with representation in Rio.
- Panama – An alleged US$59 million in bribes under former president Ricardo Martinelli (2009–2014). In July 2016, Lava Jato pointed to the existence of an international money laundering scheme set up by FPB Bank which allegedly acted to illegally open 44 offshore companies in countries with little or no tax on assets. The FPB allegedly acted in conjunction with Mossack Fonseca, of the Panama Papers investigation.
- Peru – Odebrecht reportedly disbursed millions in bribes between 2005 and 2014, with US$20 million to build the Interoceanic Highway linking the country to Brazil. The Peruvian prosecution has called for the arrest of former President Alejandro Toledo, who was arrested pre-emptively, and the Brazilian contractor prohibited from operating in the country.
- Portugal – Lava Jato has the support, in Brazil, of researchers who worked in Portugal on Operation Marquês, which brought about the jailing in late 2014 of former Prime Minister of Portugal, José Sócrates. In October 2013, Odebrecht funded a trip by former President Lula to Lisbon, in conjunction with the release of a book by Socrates. The contractor justified the trip by saying that they paid for the former Brazilian president's trip because he would participate in a ceremony marking the 25-year anniversary of the founding of Odebrecht. Portuguese officials suspected Lula would be lobbying for the contractor in Portugal.
- Venezuela – The charge is of bribes to officials of the government of Hugo Chávez and Nicolás Maduro, who is still in power. Odebrecht also claims to have paid US$98 million to authorities in the country during the Chávez administration.

== See also ==
in Portuguese:

- Desdobramentos da Operação Lava Jato
  (Operation Car Wash spin-off investigations)
- Fases da Operação Lava Jato
  (Operation Car Wash phases)
- Delações da Odebrecht na Operação Lava Jato
  (Odebrecht plea bargains in Operation Car Wash)
