= Operation Leviathan =

Operation Leviathan may refer to:

- Operation Leviathan (Brazil), a 2017 anti-corruption mission
- Operation Leviathan (Sea Shepherd), a 2006–2007 anti-whaling mission
- Operation Hadal, a 2025 Chinese film also known as Operation Leviathan
