= José Francisco das Neves =

Brazilian electrical engineer and politician (born 1947)

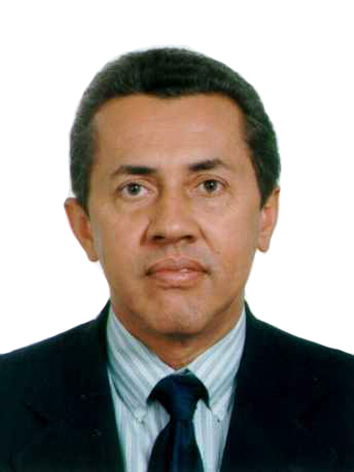

President of VALEC
- In office 2003–2011

Member of the Chamber of Deputies for Goiás
- In office 1 February 1999 – 31 January 2003

Personal details
- Born: 29 January 1947 (age 79) Goiânia, Goiás, Brazil
- Party: PMDB · PSDB · PL
- Education: Federal University of Goiás

José Francisco das Neves (born 29 January 1947), known as Juquinha, is a Brazilian electrical engineer, teacher and politician. He spent much of his early career at the Goiás state power utility CELG, where he started in a junior post and later became president of the company. He was a federal deputy for Goiás from 1999 to 2003 and, from 2003, president of VALEC, the federal company responsible for building the North–South Railway. His tenure at VALEC was the subject of a federal corruption investigation, Operation Trem Pagador; he was convicted at first instance in 2017, but the conviction was annulled in 2023 and the related administrative actions were dismissed.

== Early life and education ==
Neves was born on 29 January 1947 in Goiânia, Goiás. From the age of six until completing his studies he worked as a sweets vendor, newspaper boy and shoeshine boy. He graduated in electrical engineering from the Federal University of Goiás in 1974 and took postgraduate study in electrical distribution at Mackenzie University in São Paulo in 1976. He worked as a mathematics and drawing teacher between 1968 and 1977. Among his brothers, João Barbosa das Neves was a judge in Anápolis, where the county courthouse was later named in his honour; Adão das Neves was a federal prosecutor in Goiânia; and Camilo das Neves was a police chief in Anápolis.

== Career at CELG ==
Neves joined CELG (Companhia Energética de Goiás) in 1974 and worked through technical and directorial roles before reaching the company's presidency. By 1995 CELG served about 1.1 million consumers, and energy reached around 70 per cent of the rural area of Goiás. Its rural electrification programme, known as Luz na Roça ("Light in the Countryside"), had raised rural coverage to about 91 per cent by late 1997. In 1997 the Cachoeira Dourada power plant was separated from CELG and privatised; according to contemporary reporting it was the first power-generating company privatised in Brazil, while CELG itself remained public.

The state's rural electrification received a loan of 12,832 million yen from the Overseas Economic Cooperation Fund (OECF) — the State of Goiás Rural Electrification Project (loan BZ-P7), signed on 5 September 1991 and completed in December 1997. A 1999 ex-post evaluation by the Japan International Cooperation Agency (JICA) recorded that the project's four physical targets were met or exceeded:

BZ-P7 — planned vs. actual (JICA, 1999)
Metric	Planned	Actual
Transmission lines	1,412 km	1,813 km
Substation capacity	640 MVA	1,049 MVA
Distribution network	38,854 km	42,433 km
Rural households electrified	30,000	43,888

== Chamber of Deputies ==
Neves was elected federal deputy for Goiás in 1998 and took office on 1 February 1999 for the 1999–2003 term. Elected for the PMDB, he later moved to the PSDB and then to the PL. He was a full member of the Committee on Mines and Energy and of the special committee on the Fiscal Responsibility Law, worked on bills relating to the National Electric Energy Agency (ANEEL) and the Mining Code, and in a February 2000 floor speech supported resuming work on the North–South Railway.

== Presidency of VALEC ==
In 2003, under the government of President Lula, Neves was appointed president of VALEC, the federal company charged with advancing the North–South Railway; he held the post until 2011. Between 2007 and 2010 several stretches of the railway in Tocantins were inaugurated or tendered, among them the Aguiarnópolis–Araguaína stretch (133.5 km, 2007), Araguaína–Colinas (94 km, 2008), Colinas–Guaraí (122 km, 2010) and Colinas–Palmas/Porto Nacional (256 km, 2010).

== Legal proceedings ==
Operation Trem Pagador (Operação Trem Pagador) was a federal investigation into alleged overpricing in the North–South Railway works. In the resulting criminal case, Neves was convicted at first instance in 2017 and sentenced to ten years and seven months for money laundering and criminal association. In 2023 the 3rd Panel of the Federal Regional Court of the 1st Region annulled the conviction, holding that the telephone interceptions on which the case rested had been unlawful and that the evidence derived from them was void; the decision became final in 2024.

Two related administrative improbity actions were also dismissed. In the action concerning alleged overpricing, the claim was dismissed; according to the ruling, an expert examination found no overpricing in the works. A further action alleging illicit enrichment was likewise dismissed.
