= Caixa 2 =

Type of slush fund in Brazil

Caixa 2 (Brazilian Portuguese: caixa dois [ˈka(j).ʃɐ ˈdojs], "cash box 2") is a term used in Brazil to refer to illegal bookkeeping practices that hide financial transactions from authorities.

== Tax evasion ==
Caixa dois includes methods to evade taxes by misrepresenting income. They include parallel bookkeeping, in which accounts declared to tax authorities are manipulated down in value to reduce tax burden. The difference between declared income and that actually received is said to have gone to "cashbox two". Mechanisms for manipulation include failing to invoice, or documenting different financial amounts or goods and services than in transactions that actually occurred.

== Hiding illegal or unpopular transactions ==
Caixa dois practices may also be used by larger businesses or public entities to disguise the source of or the use of funds. For example, a slush fund may be used to hide payments for illegal services such as bribes to win contracts or access to privileged information to which the payee is not entitled.

== Legal aspects ==
In Brazil caixa dois crimes that involve money laundering or organized crime are liable to trial at the Supreme Federal Court, the country's highest court of law.

== Saco azul ==
In Portugal saco azul ("blue jacket") is used for the same concept.

== See also ==
- Operation Car Wash
