= Federal judge =

Judge appointed by a federal government

Federal judges are judges appointed by a federal level of government as opposed to the state/provincial/local level. The role and appointment process of federal judges varies significantly by country. In the United States, federal judges are appointed by the president and confirmed by the Senate, serving lifetime appointments under Article Three of the Constitution. In Russia, federal court judges are appointed by the President of the Russian Federation, while judges of the Constitutional and Supreme Courts are appointed by the Federation Council. In Brazil, federal judges serve as organs of the Judiciary, adjudicating matters involving the Union, foreign states, indigenous rights, and nationality issues.

== United States ==
A U.S. federal judge is appointed by the U.S. president and confirmed by the U.S. Senate in accordance with Article 3 of the Constitution. The U.S. Supreme Court currently has 9 justices. The judges of 13 circuit courts of appeals and 94 federal circuit courts are also appointed by the president and are therefore also "federal judges" (or Article III judges). Federal judges in the United States are appointed for life (impeachment through the U.S. Congress is possible).

For 2018, Article III judges include 807 judges: 9 in the Supreme Court, 179 in the circuit courts of appeal, 673 in the federal district courts, and 9 judges in the federal court of international trade.

As of June 2021, there are nearly 700 federal judges in the United States.

== Russia ==
The judicial system of the Russian Federation does not define the concept of “federal judge”, but provides for the position of a judge of a federal court. At the same time, all judges in the Russian Federation have a single status (Article 2, Part 1 of the Law “On the Status of Judges in the Russian Federation”). As of 2009, there were 23,297 federal judges in the country in the general court system. Judges of federal courts are appointed by the President of the Russian Federation, and judges of the Constitutional and Supreme Courts are appointed by the Federation Council.

== Brazil ==
In the words of the Federal Constitution, the judge is an organ of the Judiciary. Thus, he is an agent of the State, responsible for saying the Law definitively. Specifically in the case of the Federal Court, the judge is responsible for judging the actions in which the Union, its autarchies and federal public companies are, in some way, interested. In addition, it also judges other matters, such as those involving foreign States, the dispute over indigenous rights, cases relating to nationality and naturalization, and the execution of foreign judgment.

In criminal matters, among others, it judges political crimes and criminal offenses committed to the detriment of goods, services or interests of the Union or its municipal entities or public companies, crimes against the organization of work and, as a general rule, crimes committed on board ships or aircraft.
