= 2007 in Brazil =

Events from the year 2007 in Brazil.

== Incumbents ==
=== Federal government ===
- President: Luiz Inácio Lula da Silva
- Vice President: José Alencar Gomes da Silva

=== Governors ===
- Acre:
  - Jorge Viana (until 1 January)
  - Binho Marques (from 1 January)
- Alagoas:
  - Luís Abílio de Sousa Neto (until 1 January)
  - Teotônio Vilela Filho (from 1 January)
- Amapa: Waldez Góes
- Amazonas: Eduardo Braga
- Bahia:
  - Paulo Souto (until 1 January)
  - Jaques Wagner (from 1 January)
- Ceará:
  - Lúcio Alcântara (until 1 January)
  - Cid Gomes (from 1 January)
- Espírito Santo: Paulo Hartung
- Goiás: Alcides Rodrigues
- Maranhão:
  - José Reinaldo Tavares (until 1 January)
  - Jackson Lago (starting 1 January)
- Mato Grosso: Blairo Maggi
- Mato Grosso do Sul: José Orcírio Miranda dos Santos
- Minas Gerais: Aécio Neves
- Pará:
  - Simão Jatene (until 1 January)
  - Ana Júlia Carepa (from 1 January)
- Paraíba: Cássio Cunha Lima
- Paraná:
  - Hermas Eurides Brandão (until 1 January)
  - Roberto Requião de Mello e Silva (from 1 January)
- Pernambuco:
  - Mendonça Filho (until 1 January)
  - Eduardo Campos (from 1 January)
- Piauí: Wellington Dias
- Rio de Janeiro:
  - Rosinha Garotinho (until 1 January)
  - Sérgio Cabral Filho (from 1 January)
- Rio Grande do Norte: Wilma Maria de Faria
- Rio Grande do Sul:
  - Germano Rigotto (until 1 January)
  - Yeda Rorato Crusius (from 1 January)
- Rondônia: Ivo Narciso Cassol
- Roraima:
  - Ottomar de Sousa Pinto (until 11 December)
  - José de Anchieta Júnior (from 14 December)
- Santa Catarina:
  - Eduardo Moreira (until 1 January)
  - Luiz Henrique da Silveira (from 1 January)
- São Paulo:
  - Cláudio Lembo (until 1 January)
  - José Serra (from 1 January)
- Sergipe:
  - João Alves Filho (until 1 January)
  - Marcelo Déda (from 1 January)
- Tocantins: Marcelo Miranda

=== Vice governors ===
- Acre:
  - Arnóbio Marques de Almeida Júnior (until 1 January)
  - Carlos César Correia de Messias (from 1 January)
- Alagoas:
  - Luís Abílio de Sousa Neto (until 1 January)
  - José Wanderley Neto (from 1 January)
- Amapá: Pedro Paulo Dias de Carvalho
- Amazonas: Omar José Abdel Aziz
- Bahia:
  - Eraldo Tinoco Melo (until 1 January)
  - Edmundo Pereira Santos (from 1 January)
- Ceará:
  - Francisco de Queiroz Maia Júnior (until 1 January)
  - Francisco José Pinheiro (from 1 January)
- Espírito Santo:
  - Wellington Coimbra (until 1 January)
  - Ricardo de Rezende Ferraço (from 1 January)
- Goiás:
  - Alcides Rodrigues Filho (until 1 January)
  - Ademir de Oliveira Meneses (from 1 January)
- Maranhão:
  - Jurandir Ferro do Lago Filho (until 1 January)
  - Luís Carlos Porto (from 1 January)
- Mato Grosso:
  - Iraci Araújo Moreira (until 1 January)
  - Silval da Cunha Barbosa (from 1 January)
- Mato Grosso do Sul:
  - Egon Krakheche (until 1 January)
  - Murilo Zauith (from 1 January)
- Minas Gerais:
  - Clésio Soares de Andrade (until 1 January)
  - Antonio Augusto Junho Anastasia (from 1 January)
- Pará:
  - Valéria Pires Franco (until 1 January)
  - Odair Santos Corrêa (from 1 January)
- Paraíba:
  - Lauremília Lucena (until 1 January)
  - José Lacerda Neto (from 1 January)
- Paraná: Orlando Pessuti
- Pernambuco:
  - José Mendonça Bezerra Filho (until 1 January)
  - João Soares Lyra Neto (from 1 January)
- Piauí:
  - Osmar Ribeiro de Almeida Júnior (until 1 January)
  - Wilson Martins (from 1 January)
- Rio de Janeiro:
  - Luiz Paulo Conde (until 1 January)
  - Luiz Fernando Pezão (starting 1 January)
- Rio Grande do Norte:
  - Antônio Jácome (until 1 January)
  - Iberê Ferreira (from 1 January)
- Rio Grande do Sul:
  - Antônio Carlos Hohlfeldt (until 1 January)
  - Paulo Afonso Girardi Feijó (from 1 January)
- Rondônia:
  - Odaísa Fernandes Ferreira (until 1 January)
  - João Aparecido Cahulla (from 1 January)
- Roraima:
  - Erci de Moraes (until 1 January)
  - José de Anchieta Júnior (from 1 January)
- Santa Catarina:
  - Eduardo Pinho Moreira (until 1 January)
  - Leonel Pavan (from 1 January)
- São Paulo:
  - Vacant (until 1 January)
  - Alberto Goldman (from 1 January)
- Sergipe:
  - Marília Mandarino (until 1 January)
  - Belivaldo Chagas Silva (from 1 January)
- Tocantins:
  - Raimundo Nonato Pires dos Santos (until 1 January)
  - Paulo Sidnei Antunes (from 1 January)

== Events ==
=== January ===
- January 6: MTV Brasil VJ and model Daniella Cicarelli sues YouTube after it hosted a video recorded by the paparazzi, where she and her boyfriend are having sexual intercourse on a Spanish beach; the video did not contain explicit content. The lawsuit asks that YouTube will be blocked in Brazil until all copies of the video are removed.
- January 9: YouTube is unblocked in Brazil as a São Paulo state court revises its ruling for Daniela Cicarelli video clips.

=== February ===
- February 7: A six-year-old boy named João Hélio dies after being dragged for 7 km by a car driven by criminals during a robbery in Rio de Janeiro.
- February 16 The G8 countries, plus Brazil, China, India, Mexico and South Africa, approve the Washington Declaration, proposing a global carbon emissions trading system to replace the Kyoto Protocol by 2009.

=== March ===
- March 8: U.S. president George W. Bush departs on a tour of Latin America that takes him to Brazil, Uruguay, Colombia, Guatemala and Mexico. Upon arrival in São Paulo he is greeted with protests and demonstrations.
- March 18: Convicted in absentia of two murders in Italy during the late 1970s, Cesare Battisti is arrested in Copacabana, Rio de Janeiro.

=== April ===
- April 11: Trade officials from the United States, European Union, India and Brazil meet in New Delhi, India, to revive the World Trade Organization's Doha round of negotiations.
- April 20: The G4 group of nations, which includes Brazil, India, Germany and Japan, says that it would revive efforts for United Nations Security Council reform.

=== May ===
- May 9: Pope Benedict XVI arrives in Brazil for a five-day visit to reaffirm Catholicism in the region.
- May 10: Pope Benedict XVI urges tens of thousands of young Brazilian Catholics packing the Pacaembu stadium in São Paulo to resist the temptations of wealth, power and other "snares of evil," and tells them to promote life from "its beginning to natural end."
- May 11: Pope Benedict XVI canonizes Brazil's first native-born saint, Frei Galvão, an 18th-century Franciscan friar.
- May 22: Minister of Energy Silas Rondeau resigns over allegations of corruption in a public works project.

=== June ===
- June 26: Bolivia reclaims two oil refineries from Brazilian state-owned energy company Petrobras.
- June 27: The Military Police of Rio de Janeiro invade the favelas of Complexo do Alemão as a result of an ongoing conflict between drug traffickers. 19 people are killed and several others are injured. Eleven of those killed had no relations with drug trafficking whatsoever.

=== July ===
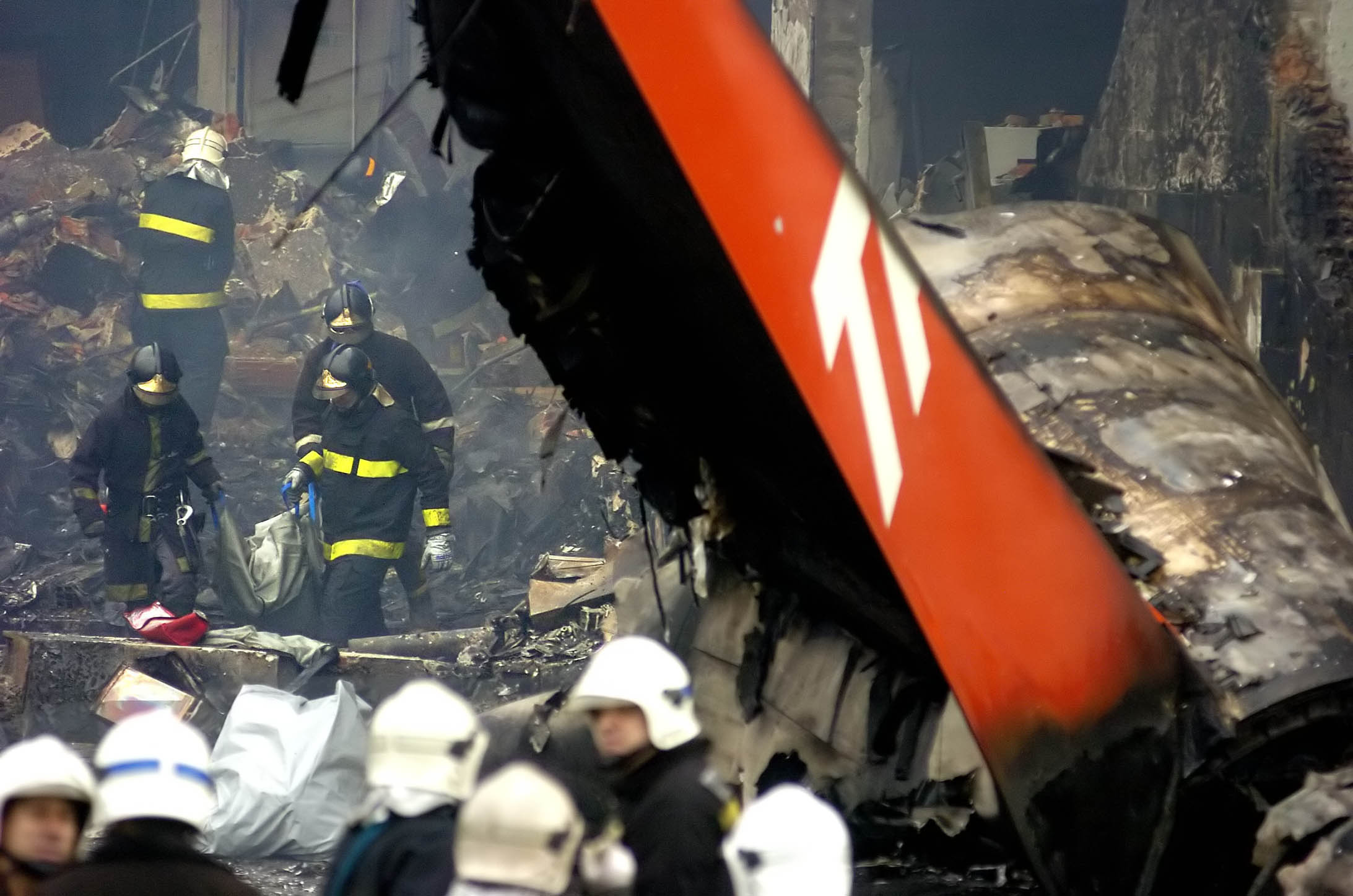
Wreckage of TAM Linhas Aéreas Flight 3054

- July 7:
  - The New Seven Wonders of the World are announced: The Great Wall of China, Petra in Jordan, Christ The Redeemer in Brazil, Machu Picchu in Peru, Mexico's Chichen Itza Mayan site, the Colosseum in Rome, and the Taj Mahal in India.
  - Live Earth gets underway with concerts in Sydney, Johannesburg, New Jersey, Rio de Janeiro, Antarctica, Tokyo, Kyoto, Shanghai, London, Hamburg, Washington, D.C., and Rome.
- July 10: President Luiz Inácio Lula da Silva announces plans to build a nuclear-powered submarine to patrol the waters off Brazil's coast at a cost of US$500 million.
- July 13 – 29: The Fifteenth Pan American Games are held in Rio de Janeiro.
- July 15: Brazil defeats Argentina 3-0 to win the 2007 Copa América. This is Brazil's eighth Copa America title.
- July 17: TAM Linhas Aéreas Flight 3054 carrying 187 people crashes into the company's own cargo depot in Congonhas International Airport, São Paulo. The crash kills everyone on board and 12 on the ground.
- July 20: President Luiz Inácio Lula da Silva orders an investigation into the crash of TAM Linhas Aéreas Flight 3054.
- July 21: A radar failure disrupts international air travel to Brazil causing disruption to thousands of travellers.
- July 25: President Luiz Inácio Lula da Silva removes Defense Minister Waldir Pires, who is responsible for civil aviation, from his Cabinet. He is replaced by former Justice Minister Nelson Jobim after two major crashes in ten months.
- July 29: Approximately 5,000 Brazilians in São Paulo, protest over the recent crash of TAM Linhas Aéreas Flight 3054.

=== August ===
- August 3: Boxers Guillermo Rigondeaux and Erislandi Lara are deported back to Cuba, after being detained in Rio de Janeiro. They had previously deserted their team at the 2007 Pan American Games and possibly seeking to go to Europe.
- August 4: Brazilian Defense Minister Nelson Jobim fires the head of the Brazilian airport authority, José Carlos Pereira for recent problems including the crash of TAM Linhas Aéreas Flight 3054. Sergio Gaudenzi, President of the Brazilian Space Agency, replaces him.
- August 6: Mexico and Brazil sign an agreement on developing technology for oil and natural gas exploration and exploitation, involving a co-operation between Pemex and Petrobras.
- August 7: Colombian drug lord of the Norte del Valle Cartel, Juan Carlos Ramirez-Abadia, is apprehended in Brazil and faces extradition to the United States. The US Government had offered a reward of US$5 million leading to his capture.
- August 16: The iBovespa falls by 3,500 points in the afternoon session on the São Paulo Stock Exchange. This is the biggest one-day drop in Brazil's stock since the September 11, 2001 attacks.

=== September ===
- September 3: Tomás Medina Caracas (nicknamed Negro Acacio), one of FARC's most important leaders and liaison between Colombian guerrillas and Brazilian drug dealers, is killed by Colombian armed forces in Guaviare.
- September 5: A Congressional committee has voted to remove the President of the Senate Renan Calheiros as a result of a corruption scandal.
- September 24:
  - President Luiz Inácio Lula da Silva says he will defend Brazil's record on global climate change, when he addresses the United Nations General Assembly this week.
  - Brazil's stock market rises to a record 58,393.75 points and the real gains 0.11 percent to 1.867 per U.S. dollar.

=== October ===
- October 21: Kimi Raikkonen wins the Brazilian Grand Prix and the Championship against Fernando Alonso and Lewis Hamilton.
- October 30: Brazil is confirmed by FIFA to host the 2014 World Cup.

=== November ===
- November 4: At least six people are killed after a Learjet 35 crashed into a residential district in São Paulo, Brazil.
- November 25: At least seven football fans are killed after part of the Fonte Nova stadium in Salvador de Bahia collapses.

=== December ===
- December 2: Brazil starts free-to-air digital television transmissions in São Paulo. However, broadcasting companies must transmit signals in both analogue and digital formats until June 2016.
- December 4: Senator Renan Calheiros resigns as president of the Federal Senate of Brazil and is acquitted for the second time.
- December 17: Presidents Lula da Silva (Brazil), Michelle Bachelet (Chile), and Evo Morales (Bolivia) agree to build a highway by 2009 that will link the Atlantic (in Santos, Brazil) and the Pacific (in Iquique, Chile) coasts of South America.
- December 20: The Portrait of Suzanne Bloch (1904), by Pablo Picasso and O Lavrador de Café by Cândido Portinari, are stolen from the São Paulo Museum of Art.

== Deaths ==
=== January ===
- January 4: Padre Léo, priest of the Dehonians (born 1961)

=== February ===
- February 4: José Carlos Bauer, footballer (born 1925)

=== March ===
- March 5: Ivo Lorscheiter, 79, Catholic Bishop and advocate of liberation theology (born 1927)

=== April ===
- April 16: Maria Lenk, Olympic swimmer (1932, 1936) (born 1915).
- April 17: Nair Bello, actress (born 1931)
- April 29: Octavio Frias, publishing magnate (born 1912)

=== May ===
- May 6: Enéas Carneiro, politician (born 1938)

=== June ===
- June 1: Marly de Oliveira, poet ("O Mar de Permeio") (born 1938)

=== July ===
- July 17:
  - Paulo Rogério Amoretty Souza, chairman of SCI and attorney for Corinthians (born 1945)
  - Júlio Redecker, leader of the Social Democracy Party (born 1956)

=== August ===
- August 2: Franco Dalla Valle, Roman Catholic Bishop of Juína (born 1945)

=== October ===
- October 1: Tetsuo Okamoto, swimmer and Brazil's first Olympic swimming medallist (1952) (born 1932)
- October 8: Constantine Andreou, painter and sculptor (born 1917)
- October 12: Paulo Autran, 85, actor (born 1922)
- October 26: Hans Stern, jeweler and entrepreneur (born 1922)

=== December ===
- December 9: Rafael Sperafico, racing driver (born 1981)
- December 11: Ottomar Pinto, Governor of Roraima (2004–2007), (born 1931)
- December 15: Ryan Gracie, martial artist (born 1974)
- December 21: Norton Nascimento, actor (born 1962)
- December 23: Aloísio Lorscheider, cardinal (born 1924)
- December 24: Cláudio Camunguelo, composer and singer (born 1947)
- December 27: Prince Pedro Gastão of Orléans-Braganza, pretender to the title Emperor of Brazil (born 1913)
- December 29: Olayr Coan, actor and theater director (born 1959)

== See also ==
- 2007 in Brazilian football
- 2007 in Brazilian television
- List of Brazilian films of 2007
