= Othon Pinheiro da Silva =

Brazilian military engineer

Vice admiral Othon Pinheiro da Silva
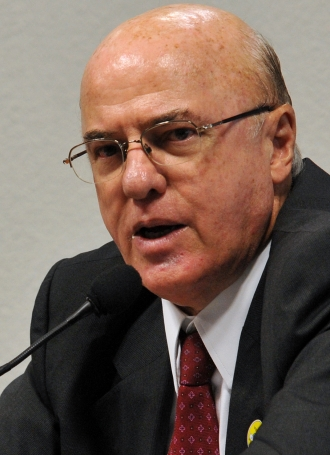

Personal details
- Born: Othon Luiz Pinheiro da Silva; 25 February 1939 (age 87) Sumidouro, Rio de Janeiro, Brazil
- Education: São Paulo Polytechnic School (BE); Massachusetts Institute of Technology (ME)
- Occupation: Marine, mechanical and nuclear engineer
- Known for: Development of the Brazilian nuclear program

Military service
- Allegiance: Brazil
- Branch/service: Brazilian Navy
- Years of service: 1960–1994
- Rank: Vice admiral
- Awards: National Order of Scientific Merit; Order of Naval Merit; Order of Military Merit; Order of Aeronautical Merit; Tamandaré Merit Medal; Peacemaker Medal; Santos Dumont Merit Medal; Golden Military Medal

Othon Luiz Pinheiro da Silva (born 25 February 1939) is a Brazilian physicist, mechanical and nuclear engineer, vice admiral of the Brazilian Navy Naval Engineers and Technicians Corps. He had also served as president of state-owned company Eletronuclear.

Othon's biography is deeply related to the Brazilian nuclear program. He is known and received many homages for being one of the main responsibles for the development of a technology for uranium enrichment called ultracentrifugation. This allowed the country to be independent for dominating all of the nuclear power commodity chain, ensuring the construction of the nuclear propulsion submarine SN Álvaro Alberto (SN-10) and the supply of the country's power plants.

The vice admiral was arrested for the first time in Operation Radioactivity, 16th Phase of Operation Car Wash, triggered by the accusation of Dalton Avanci, former executive of contractor Camargo Corrêa. Later, he was arrested again in Operation Pripyat, an offshoot of the previous one, which investigated accusations of corruption in Eletronuclear.

Othon was convicted by judge Marcelo Bretas to 43 years in prison and was kept in the Brazilian Marine Corps headquarters of Meriti River in Duque de Caxias, Rio de Janeiro. Silva was later released due a habeas corpus granted in October 2017 by the Federal Regional Court of the 2nd Region (TRF-2). In 2022, TRF-2 reviewed his conviction and replaced the prison sentence with restrictions on rights.

== Life and career ==
Othon graduated in 1960 at the Naval School and in Naval Engineering at the São Paulo Polytechnic School in 1966, with a master's degree at the Massachusetts Institute of Technology, concomitantly with a bachelor's degree in Nuclear Engineering.

Returning to Brazil, he was tasked to begin the first studies for a Brazilian nuclear submarine and led the Brazilian Navy Nuclear Program from 1979 to 1994. Secretly conducted by the Navy, the project resulted in the development of a national technology for uranium enrichment using ultracentrifugation, which currently produces part of the fuel for Angra Nuclear Power Plant.

Othon was director of reactors researches of the Institute for Energy and Nuclear Research (IPEN) from 1982 to 1984. At this time, he was actively monitored by the CIA, which kept an agent, Ray H. Allar, living in an apartment next to the admiral's in São Paulo. Along with Marcos Honauser, Othon controlled secret bank accounts, from which funds were applied in parallel nuclear programs. Found by journalist Tânia Malheiros, who published the book "Brasil, a Bomba Oculta" (Brazil, the Hidden Bomb), the case was target of investigation, archived in 1988 by Prosecutor-General Sepúlveda Pertence.

In 1994, he retired from the military as vice admiral and opened a consulting company for projects in energy.

== Civilian and military awards ==
- – National Order of Scientific Merit (Grand Cross)
- – Order of Naval Merit (Commander)
- – Order of Military Merit (Commander)
- – Order of Aeronautical Merit (Commander)
- – Tamandaré Merit Medal
- – Peacemaker Medal
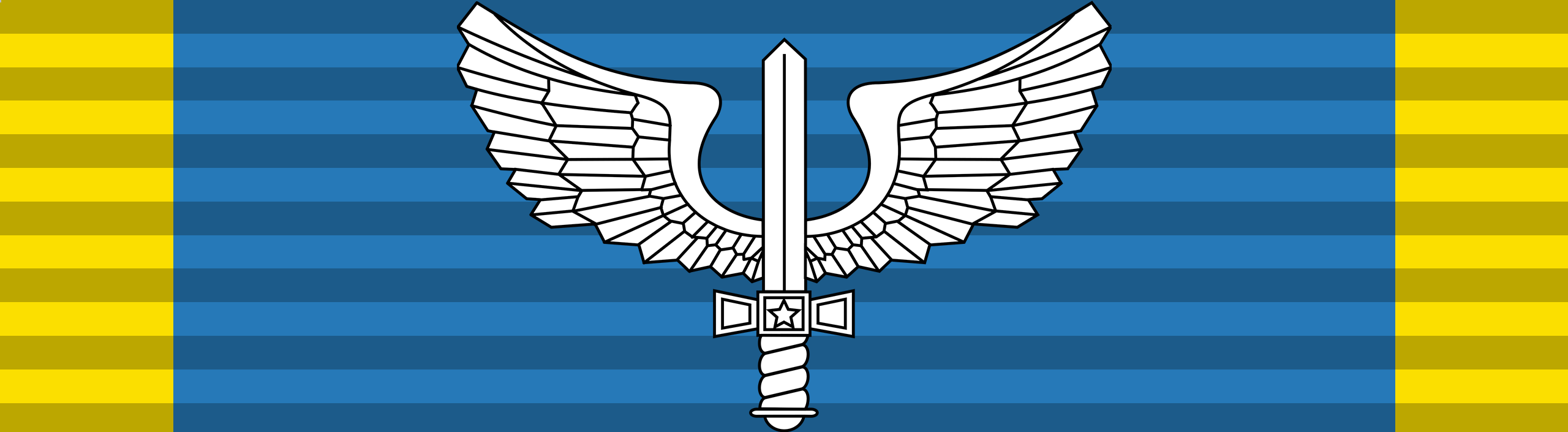
- – Santos Dumont Merit Medal
- – Golden Military Medal

== Prison and conviction ==
Othon Pinheiro da Silva
- Status: Released
- Convictions: Corruption, money laundering, obstruction of justice, tax evasion, criminal organization
- Penalty: 43 years in prison (later reduced to 4 years, 10 months and 10 days in prison and replaced by restriction on rights)

In 2005, during the first term of Luiz Inácio Lula da Silva, Othon assumed the presidency of Eletronuclear, invited by Minister of Mines and Energy Silas Rondeau. During his administration, the construction of Angra 3 reactor, suspended for 23 years, was resumed. In April 2015, Othon was suspended from office after accusations of bribe payments to company directors. He was arrested on 28 July, during investigations of Operation Car Wash, which revealed evidences of payments of R$4.5 million (US$1.35 million) in bribes made by contractors consortiums. Imprisoned in Rio de Janeiro after Operation Radioactivity, he was taken to the Federal Police Superintendence in Curitiba.

On 6 July 2016, Othon was arrested again by the Federal Police in an offshoot of Operation Car Wash, named Pripyat, which investigates corruption in Eletrobras. In August, judge Marcelo Bretas convicted vice admiral Othon to 43 years of prison for the crimes of corruption, money laundering, obstruction of justice, tax evasion and criminal organization during the construction of Angra 3 nuclear power plant.

In October 2017, Othon was released after a habeas corpus was granted by the Federal Regional Court of the 2nd Region.

In 2022, the same court reduced his sentence from 43 years to 4 years, 10 months and 10 days in prison and replaced the prison sentence with two sentences of restrictions on rights.

== See also ==
- Álvaro Alberto da Motta e Silva
- Eletronuclear
- Nuclear activities in Brazil
- Nuclebrás Equipamentos Pesados
- Resende Nuclear Fuel Factory
