= 1956 in Brazil =

Events in the year 1956 in Brazil.

== Incumbents ==
=== Federal government ===
- President:
  - Nereu Ramos (until 30 January)
  - Juscelino Kubitschek (starting 31 January)
- Vice President:
  - Vacant (until 30 January)
  - João Goulart (starting 31 January)

=== Governors ===
- Alagoas:
  - Arnon de Mello (until 31 January)
  - Sebastião Muniz Falcão (from 31 January)
- Amazonas: Plínio Ramos Coelho
- Bahia: Antônio Balbino
- Ceará: Paulo Sarasate
- Espírito Santo: Francisco Lacerda de Aguiar
- Goiás: José Ludovico de Almeida
- Maranhão:
  - Eugênio Barros (until 31 January)
  - Alderico Machado (31 January-26 March)
  - Eurico Ribeiro (from 26 March)
- Mato Grosso: João Ponce de Arruda
- Minas Gerais: José Francisco Bias Fortes
- Pará:
  - Zacarias de Assumpção (until 31 January)
  - Edward Catete Pinheiro (31 January-10 June)
  - Magalhães Barata (starting 10 June)
- Paraíba:
  - José Américo de Almeida (until 31 January)
  - Flávio Coutinho (from 31 January)
- Paraná:
  - Adolfo de Oliveira Franco (until 31 January)
  - Moisés Lupion (from 31 January)
- Pernambuco: Osvaldo Cordeiro de Farias
- Piauí: Jacob Gaioso e Almendra
- Rio de Janeiro: Miguel Couto Filho
- Rio Grande do Norte:
  - Silvio Piza Pedrosa (until 31 January)
  - Dinarte de Medeiros Mariz (from 31 January)
- Rio Grande do Sul: Ildo Meneghetti
- Santa Catarina:
  - Irineu Bornhausen (until 31 January)
  - Jorge Lacerda (from 31 January)
- São Paulo: Jânio Quadros
- Sergipe: Leandro Maciel

=== Vice governors ===
- Alagoas: Sizenando Nabuco de Melo
- Ceará: Wilson Gonçalves
- Espírito Santo: Adwalter Ribeiro Soares
- Goiás: Bernardo Sayão Carvalho Araújo
- Maranhão:
  - Renato Bayma Archer da Silva (until 31 January)
  - Vacant thereafter (from 31 January)
- Mato Grosso:
  - João Leite de Barros (until 31 January)
  - Henrique José Vieira Neto (from 31 January)
- Minas Gerais:
  - Vacant (until 31 January)
  - Artur Bernardes Filho (from 31 January)
- Paraíba:
  - João Fernandes de Lima (until 31 January)
  - Pedro Gondim (from 31 January)
- Piauí: Francisco Ferreira de Castro
- Rio de Janeiro: Roberto Silveira
- Rio Grande do Norte: José Augusto Varela (from 31 January)
- Santa Catarina:
  - José de Miranda Ramos (31 January-5 August)
  - Heriberto Hülse (from 5 August)
- São Paulo: Porfírio da Paz
- Sergipe: José Machado de Souza

== Events ==
=== January ===
- January 31: Juscelino Kubitschek is inaugurated as the 21st President of Brazil.

=== February ===
- February 1: Decree nº 38.744 creates the Development Council, which would implement the Plan of Goals (an industrialization and modernization program).
- February 10-29: Brazilian Air Force soldiers rebel in Jacareacanga, against the new government under Juscelino Kubitschek. The revolt ends after the leader, Haroldo Veloso, is arrested.

=== April ===
- April 25: Usiminas, one of Brazil's largest steelmakers, is founded in Ipatinga, in the state of Minas Gerais.

=== May ===
- May 30: Police and students clash during the UNE campaign against the increase of tram fares in Rio de Janeiro.

=== September ===
- September 5: Romi-Isetta, a machine-tool manufacturer based in Santa Bárbara d'Oeste, begins producing the Isetta car under licence.
- September 7: Pelé begins his Santos FC career at age 15 and scores a goal to beat Corinthians de Santo André 7–1 in Santo André, São Paulo.
- September 14: The project on moving the federal capital is approved by the Federal Senate of Brazil.
- September 19: President Juscelino Kubitschek signs Law nº 2.874, which changes the federal capital of Brazil from Rio de Janeiro to Brasília, as well as creating the Urbanization Company of New Capital of Brazil (Portuguese: Companhia Urbanizadora da Nova Capital do Brasil (NOVACAP)).

=== November ===
- November 22: Brazil sends a team of 44 athletes to compete in 28 events and 11 sports in the 1956 Summer Olympics in Melbourne, Australia.
- November 23: General Juarez Távora is arrested for holding a political demonstration. Military clubs holding political demonstrations are also closed.
- November 27: Adhemar Ferreira da Silva wins the gold medal in the triple jump at the Melbourne Summer Olympics and becomes the first Brazilian athlete to be twice Olympic champion.

== Births ==
=== January ===
- January 5: Celso Blues Boy, singer-songwriter and guitarist (died 2012)

=== February ===
- February 29: Luiz Duarte da Rocha, playwright, director and musician

=== March ===
- March 15: Oswaldo Montenegro, singer
- March 28: Zizi Possi, singer

=== April ===
- April 7: Luiz Avellar, piano player

=== August ===
- August 9: Fafá de Belém, singer

=== November ===
- November 3: Eike Batista, entrepreneur

=== December ===
- December 28: Cadão Volpato, musician, artist, journalist and write

== Deaths ==
- February 28: Florentino Ávidos, politician (born 1870)

== See also ==
- 1956 in Brazilian football
- 1956 in Brazilian television
