= 1956 in Brazilian television =

This is a list of Brazilian television related events from 1956.

== Television shows ==
- Sítio do Pica-pau Amarelo (1952–1963)

== Births ==
- 1 July - Solange Couto, actress & TV host

== See also ==
- 1956 in Brazil
