= List of Brazilian films of 1938 =

A list of films produced in Brazil in 1938:

Title	Director	Cast	Genre	Notes
Alma e Corpo de uma Raça	Milton Rodrigues	Lygia Cordovil, Roberto Lupo, Henry Aschar	Drama	
Maridinho de Luxo	Luiz de Barros	Mesquitinha, María Amaro, Oscar Soares	Comedy	
Tererê Não Resolve	Luiz de Barros	Alvarenga, María Amaro, Carlos Barbosa	Comedy	

== See also ==
- 1938 in Brazil
