= 1938 in Brazil =

Events in the year 1938 in Brazil.

== Incumbents ==
=== Federal government ===
- President: Getúlio Vargas

=== Governors ===
- Alagoas: Osman Laurel
- Amazonas: Álvaro Botelho Maia
- Bahia: Antônio Fernandes Dantas then Landulfo Alves
- Ceará: Francisco de Meneses Pimentel
- Espírito Santo: João Punaro Bley
- Goiás: Pedro Ludovico Teixeira
- Maranhão:
- Mato Grosso: Júlio Strübing Müller
- Minas Gerais: Benedito Valadares Ribeiro
- Pará: José Carneiro da Gama Malcher
- Paraíba: Argemiro de Figueiredo
- Paraná: Manuel Ribas
- Pernambuco: Agamenon Magalhães
- Piauí: Leônidas Melo
- Rio Grande do Norte: Rafael Fernandes Gurjão
- Rio Grande do Sul:
  - till 19 January: Manuel de Cerqueira Daltro Filho
  - 19 January-4 March: Joaquim Maurício Cardoso
  - from 4 March: Osvaldo Cordeiro de Farias
- Santa Catarina: Nereu Ramos
- São Paulo:
  - till 25 April: José Joaquim Cardoso de Melo Neto
  - 25 April-27 April: Francisco José da Silva Júnior
  - from 27 April: Ademar de Barros
- Sergipe: Erônides de Carvalho

=== Vice governors ===
- Rio Grande do Norte: no vice governor
- São Paulo: no vice governor

== Events ==
- 2 January - The governmental radio program Hora do Brasil begins to be broadcast throughout the country.
- 3 January - The presidential election is not held due to Getúlio Vargas' coup d'état.
- May – The Brazilian integralist movement attempt a coup d'état, supported by the Axis powers. The failure of the "Pajama Putsch" leads to the dissolution of the AIB.
- 28 July – Folk hero Lampião and his band are ambushed in one of his hideouts, the Angicos farm, in the state of Sergipe.
- date unknown
  - Michel Bernanos visits Brazil for the first time.
  - Mário de Andrade takes up a post at the Universidade Federal do Rio de Janeiro.

== Arts and culture ==
=== Films ===
- Alma e Corpo de uma Raça
- Aruanã
- Maridinho de Luxo
- Tererê Não Resolve

== Births ==
=== January ===
- 16 January: Jô Soares, comedian and talk show host (died 2022)
- 27 January: Raul Gil, television presenter and singer

=== April ===
- 5 April: Marly Marley, actress and vedette (died 2014)

=== June ===
- 6 June: Prince Luiz of Orléans-Braganza, pretender to the Brazilian throne (died 2022)

=== July ===
- 23 July: Menalton Braff, novelist and short story writer
- 25 July: Sérgio Ferro, painter

=== August ===
- 18 August: Orestes Quércia, politician (died 2010)

=== November ===
- 5 November: Enéas Carneiro, politician (died 2007)
- 25 November: Luiz Henrique Rosa, musician and soccer player (died 1985)

== Deaths ==
- 28 July:
  - Lampião, bandit (born 1897; killed in a police ambush)
  - Maria Bonita, bandit (born 1911; killed along with her boyfriend Lampião)

== See also ==
- 1938 in Brazilian football
- List of Brazilian films of 1938
