= Military Medal (Brazil) =

- Type: Long Service Award
- Awarded for: Long and Distinguished Service
- Country: Brazil
- Presented by: President of Brazil
- Eligibility: Members of the Brazilian Land Army, Navy, Air Force and teaching officers
- Clasps: Silver, Gold and Platinum
- Established: 15 November 1901; 125 years ago
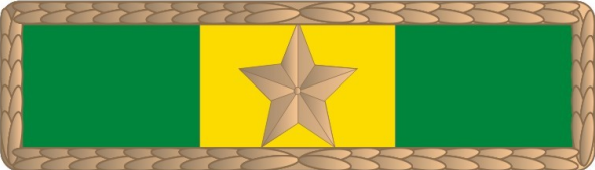
- Bronze Award Ribbon

Precedence
- Next (higher): Brazilian Expeditionary Force Contribution Medal
- Next (lower): Air Troop Corps Medal

Military Medal (Portuguese: Medalha Militar) – Brazilian military decoration, established on November 15, 1901, as an honorary distinction for good and long service.

Created by Decree No. 4,238 on November 15, 1901, the Military Medal is awarded to members of the Armed Forces in recognition of their good service during active duty. Bronze Medals with a Bronze Clasp, Silver Medals with a Silver Clasp, Gold Medals with a Gold Clasp, and Gold Medals with a Platinum Clasp will be awarded to service members who have completed, respectively, ten, twenty, thirty, and forty years of good service, provided they meet the required conditions. The Platinum Medal with a Platinum Clasp was approved and minted by the President of the Republic, through Decree No. 70,751 on June 23, 1972, as recognition for service members who have completed more than fifty years of good service.

== Grades ==
It is divided into five grades, differing in the colors of the badge and the number of stars placed in the form of a frame-shaped fitting made of the appropriate metal, with the appropriate number of stars attached to the ribbon:

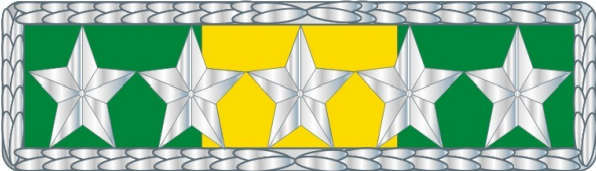
- Military Medal (5 Stars: Platinum - 50 Years) (Note: Portuguese: Medalha Militar – Medalha de Platina com Passador de Platina) (Brazil) – Platinum medal. Platinum clasp. Ribbon with 5 five platinum stars. 50 years of service;
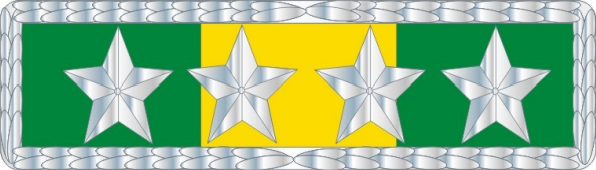
- Military Medal (4 Stars: Gold - 40 Years) (Note: Portuguese: Medalha Militar – Medalha de Ouro com Passador de Platina) (Brazil) – Gold medal. Platinum clasp. Ribbon with 4 platinum stars. 40 years of service;
- Military Medal (3 Stars: Gold - 30 Years) (Note: Portuguese: Medalha Militar – Medalha de Ouro com Passador de Ouro) (Brazil) – Gold medal. Gold clasp. Ribbon with 3 gold stars. 30 years of service;
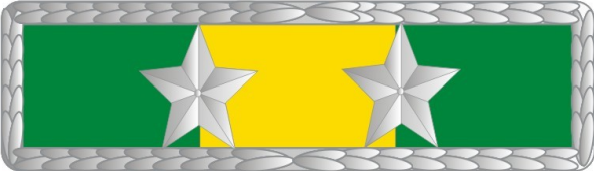
- Military Medal (2 Stars: Silver - 20 Years) (Note: Portuguese: Medalha Militar – Medalha de Prata com Passador de Prata) (Brazil) – Silver medal. Silver clasp. Ribbon with 2 silver stars. 20 years of service;
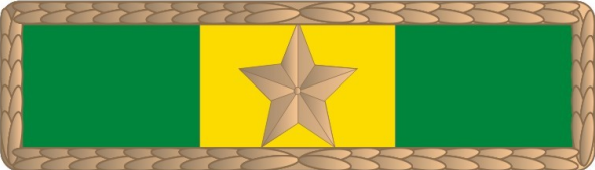
- Military Medal (1 Star: Bronze - 10 Years) (Note: Portuguese: Medalha Militar – Medalha de Bronze com Passador de Bronze) (Brazil) – Bronze medal. Bronze clasp. Ribbon with 1 bronze star. 10 years of service.

== Precedence ==
In the Brazilian order of seniority of decorations, this medal ranks immediately after the Brazilian Expeditionary Force Contribution Medal, and before the Air Troop Corps Medal.
