= Luiz Duarte da Rocha =

Brazilian playwright and director

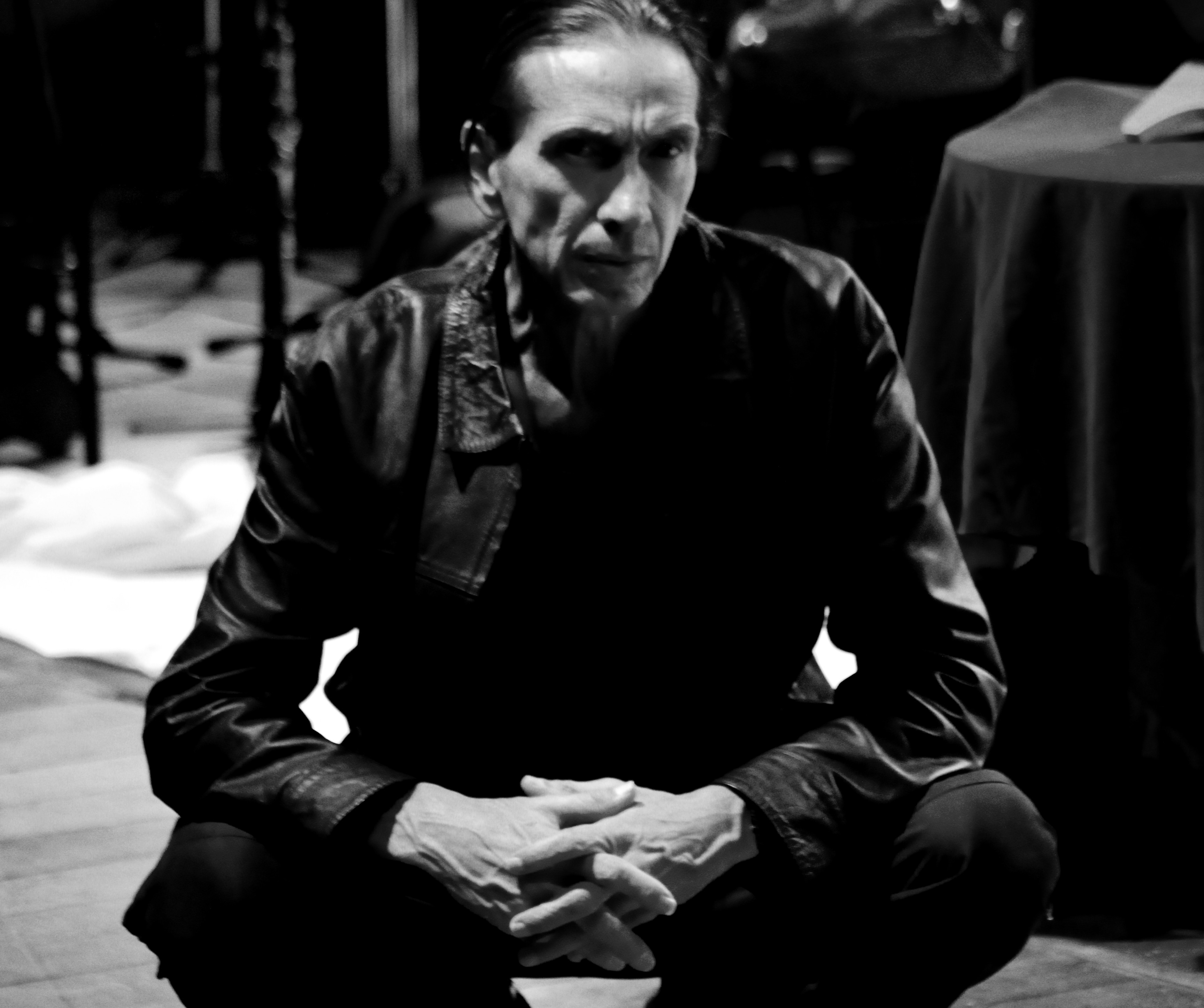
- Born: February 29, 1956 (age 70); Rio de Janeiro, Brazil

Luiz Duarte da Rocha (born 29 February 1956) Luiz Duarte, playwright and director, is one of the most expressive and award-winning Brazilian creators - Jabuti Literature Prize, Mambembe Prize, National Dramaturgy Prize About the Black Question - FUNDACEN. His works range from comedy to drama, both for children and adults. In addition to his dedication to theater, Luiz Duarte is a screenwriter and director of cinema and television, with dozens of documentaries produced - primarily scientific, having written the film's script in partnership with Ruy Guerra and Gabriel Garcia Marques "Luana" (which ended up not being produced, due to the monetary confiscation carried out in Brazil by former president Collor ). In 2010 Luiz Duarte released the short film poet-2987347 "The boy and the poet" in which for the first time in the history of cinema, the voice of a deceased person was recreated - in this case the voice of the poet Carlos Drummond de Andrade. His most recent film is the feature film "Looping", which has not yet been released.

== Observation ==
For the most up-to-date information, follow this link to the "Portuguese Wikipedia" - already translated into English.

== Career ==
Duarte was born in Rio de Janeiro. He recorded two albums, but stopped recording in 1984 for 20 years before returning with a show titled “Caetaneando”. As an author, in 1988 he won the Jabuti Award for his book Irmão Grimm, Irmão Grimm.

== Awards ==
He has received more than 16 awards and 63 nominations, including, for three times, the Prêmio Mambembe de Teatro - the most important theater award in Brazil -, and Prêmio Jabuti, the most important book award in Brazil.

== Main Theater Plays ==
- Adults: As Deusas de Cameron, As Larvas, Atrizes de Ouro, Canto e Briga na Terra Santa, Contos do Alquimista, Escrava Anastácia.
- Youth: Anathron, Dom Quixote - Figuras da Triste Figura

=== For children ===
A Caixa de Cristal; A Feiticeira, o Ogro e o Soldado; A Floresta Mágica; A Fuga do Planeta Kiltran; As Incríveis Mulheres do Dr. Kynoba; Cinderela Chinesa; Irmão Grimm, Irmão Grimm.

== Main awards ==
- Prêmio Jabuti de Literatura (Jabuti Award, Literature) - the book Irmão Grimm, Irmão Grimm (1988)
- Prêmio INACEM 1987-RJ - 5 best plays in the year
- Prêmio MinC - Troféu Mambembe 1987 - best new playwright and director
- Prêmio ESTÍMULO-S.C. São Paulo - 1988 - Anathron - best play - One of the 10 best productions of the 1980s, by the newspaper Estado de São Paulo.
- Prêmio Nacional de Dramaturgia sobre a Questão do Negro – FUNDACEN/1988 - with Escrava Anastácia
- Prêmio MinC - Troféu Mambembe 1988 - best production
- Prêmio MinC - Troféu Mambembe 1989 - best playwright
- Prêmio Coca-Cola de Teatro Para a Juventude - 1989 - best playwright
