= Olayr Coan =

Brazilian actor (1959–2007)

Olayr José Coan (January 7, 1959 – December 29, 2007) was a Brazilian actor, author and theater director. Coan worked in both television and theater as an actor.

== Personal life ==
Olayr Coan was born in Porto Feliz, São Paulo state, Brazil, on January 7, 1959. Coan never married and had no children.

== Career ==
Coan was a graduate of the Escola de Arte Dramática (EAD-USP), which is part of the University of São Paulo. He joined the Centro de Pesquisa Teatral (Research Center of Theater), which was headed by Brazilian theater director Antunes Filho. He worked on such plays as Romeo and Juliet (Romeu e Julieta), Macunaíma and Nelson 2 Rodrigues (Nelson Rodrigues 2) while at the Research Center.

Coan's theater directing work included Veríssimo em Revista by Luis Fernando Verissimo and Laranja Mecânica (Orange Mechanics), which is based on the works of Anthony Burgess. He also authored several writings and scripts, which later became parts of the plays A Traída, Onde Fica o Leste (Where is The East), O Bar, A Língua Perdida, Em Falsete and TV or Not TV.

Coan's recent works included Toda Nudez Será Castigada by Nelson Rodrigues in 2006 and Dracula, based on the classic by Bram Stoker, which debuted at the Teatro Cultura Inglesa in São Paulo in 2007. Another of Coan's theater production, A Lua sobre o Tapete (The Moon On The Carpet), which has enjoyed several successful seasons at the Centro Cultural São Paulo and the Teatro Fábrica São Paulo theaters.

His television credits included As Pupilas do Senhor Reitor, which aired on SBT in 1995.

Coan was awarded the Shell Award for best actor in 1998 in São Paulo for his performance in the monologue, A Confissão de Leontina (The Confession, Leontina), which was adapted from the work of Brazilian novelist, Lygia Fagundes Telles.

Coan's most recent work was the play, O Mala (Mala), which was scheduled to premiere in the first week of January 2008 at the Teatro Folha in São Paulo, shortly after his death.

== Death ==
Olayr Coan was killed in a one car crash on the Highway Castello Branco in São Paulo state in the early hours of Saturday, December 29, 2007. He was 48 years old. Coan was driving alone to his hometown of Porto Feliz, where he was planning to spend New Year's Eve with his mother and five brothers.

Coan was buried in his native city of Porto Feliz on Monday afternoon, December 31, 2007.
