= Tamandaré Merit Medal =

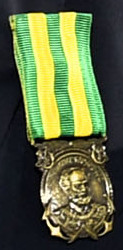
- Awarded for: Service to the Brazil Navy
- Date: August 20, 1957
- Country: Brazil

The Tamandaré Medal of Merit is a decoration of the Brazilian Navy intended to award authorities, institutions and civil and military persons, Brazilian or foreign, who have rendered relevant services, in the sense of disseminating or strengthening the traditions of the Brazilian Navy, honoring their deeds or highlighting their historical figures.

It was created by Decree 42.111, of August 20, 1957 as a tribute to the Patron of the Brazilian Navy, Admiral Joaquim Marques Lisboa, Marquis of Tamandaré. It is awarded to recipients annually on December 13.

The medal bears on the backside the inscription: A MARINHA BRASILEIRA AO SEU GLORIOSO PATRONO 1957 ("The Brazilian Navy to its Glorious Patron 1957").

== See also ==
- Orders, decorations, and medals of Brazil
- Tamandaré-class frigate
