= Nuclear activities in Brazil =

Nuclear power stations in Brazil (view)
Active plants

Nuclear energy accounts for about 2% of Brazil's electricity. It is produced by two pressurized water reactors at Angra, which is the country's sole nuclear power plant. Construction of a third reactor begun on 1 June 2010, but it is currently stalled. The sole Brazilian company in charge of nuclear energy production is Eletronuclear.

Uranium exploration, production and export in Brazil is under state control through Indústrias Nucleares do Brasil although the government has announced it is ready to involve the private sector in the nuclear fuel industry.

== Brazilian nuclear activities ==
=== Early years (1930–60) ===
In Brazil, theoretical research in the field of nuclear energy began at the University of São Paulo (USP) in the late 1930s. The following decade, Brazil became a supplier of mineral resources (monazite, thorium and uranium) to nuclear experimentation projects in the United States, such as the Manhattan Project.

In 1947, Álvaro Alberto, a Navy official and a vocal supporter of nuclear power, wrote the first Brazilian nuclear policy plan to be approved by Brazil's national security council, the Conselho de Segurança Nacional (CSN). Implementation of the plan began in 1951, with the establishment of Brazil's national research council, the Conselho Nacional de Pesquisas (CNPq), and the nomination of Alberto as its president. The institution's general purpose was to promote technological and scientific research in all areas of knowledge and CNPq had specific responsibilities related to the development of nuclear energy; such as promoting research on relevant mineral resources and undertaking the necessary measures to boost the industrialization of nuclear energy.

The path toward developing a Brazilian nuclear sector included the nationalization of nuclear activities and specific compensations for exporting strategic raw materials. Accordingly, Brazil attempted to negotiate trade agreements that, in exchange for Brazilian raw materials, would include provisions to grant easier access to sensitive technologies and training for Brazilian nuclear engineers. This policy granted Brazilian scientists and engineers opportunities to undertake academic exchanges and training in the U.S.

CNPq sought to acquire nuclear technology from the U.S. and other countries. Washington, however, rejected Alberto's request to purchase a cyclotron from General Electric, which would have allowed Brazil to conduct advanced nuclear physics experiments. Alberto also started negotiations for the acquisition of ultracentrifuges from West Germany.

By the mid-1950s Brazil's nuclear program had purchased 3 West German centrifuges for US$80,000. Although the centrifuges arrived in Brazil in 1956, they only became operational in the 1970s.

A Parliamentary Commission of Inquiry (Comissão Parlamentar de Inquérito – CPI) established in 1956 uncovered the illegal exports of atomic materials to the United States. It also revealed that Juarez Távora, chief of the military cabinet in the early stages of the Café Filho administration in 1954, acted in accordance with U.S. requests and adopted a new nuclear policy plan whereby the U.S. was considered the privileged partner of Brazil in the nuclear field.

After the investigation was completed, the CPI argued in favor of a more nationalist approach to nuclear policy, resuming the plans advocated by Alberto and the CNPq. The new nuclear plan adopted by recently elected President Juscelino Kubitschek created a National Nuclear Energy Commission(Comissão Nacional de Energia Nuclear – CNEN) under presidential oversight. It also cancelled all the contracts related to atomic minerals exports.

In 1957 Brazil obtained its first research reactor from the U.S. under the "Atoms for Peace" program. IEA-R1, as it became known when it reached the Institute of Atomic Energy (Instituto de Energia Atômica – IEA) in São Paulo, was the first reactor ever to operate in the southern hemisphere. This was followed in 1960 by the research reactor TRIGA Mark 1, located at the Institute of Radioactive Research (Instituto de Pesquisas Radioativas – IPR) of the Federal University of Minas Gerais (UFMG), which was used in training and research activities related to radioisotope production.

=== 1961–72 ===
By 1962 Brazil had built its first indigenous research reactor, the Argonauta, which commenced operations in 1965 at the Rio de Janeiro-based Nuclear Engineering Institute (Instituto de Engenharia Nuclear – IEN). The Argonauta was an adaptation of a reactor designed by the Argonne National Laboratory in the United States.

In the aftermath of the 1964 coup d’état that ousted the popularly elected government, the ruling military devised a nuclear policy based on the purchase of nuclear power plants in order to generate electricity but also create the conditions for an indigenous nuclear industrial complex inside Brazil. In the long term, stated the plan, Brazil would seek to acquire all the technologies necessary to master the nuclear fuel production cycle. With regard to international standards mandating a limit to peaceful nuclear explosions (PNE), the military's nuclear policy affirmed that renouncing the right of independent fabrication of PNEs represented "a price too high to pay", since

"1. the draft of the global Treaty does not represent a commitment toward disarmament for nuclear weapon countries;
2. France and China do not participate in the negotiations;
3. there are great perspectives in the use of nuclear explosives in mining, opening of ports, canals, and earthmoving, as has been demonstrated by U.S. experiences of the Plowshare program;
4. the knowledge of the technique leading to the construction of nuclear explosives, since subject to the international account and limited to specific objectives of economic development, neither constitutes proliferation nor is necessarily stimulated."

Accordingly, in a CSN meeting, President Artur da Costa e Silva voiced arguments in favor of "doing research, mining and building devices that can explode" and added: "We will not call them bombs, we will call them devices that can explode. In 1968 a new CPI assessed existing mineral resources in Brazil for the nuclear program. Two years later, the parliamentary commission completed its work and concluded that the Brazilian booming industrial growth meant a rising demand of electricity in the country, which confirmed the necessity of nuclear energy.

Also in 1968, the government issued a secret "National Strategic Concept" arguing that the acquisition of nuclear science and technology was a means to overcome Brazil's peripheral position in world affairs. According to this perspective, Brazil could not accept the Nuclear Non-Proliferation Treaty (NPT), an international accord perceived by Brazil as an instrument to curtail the national development of nuclear energy in non-nuclear weapon countries, which did not solve the problem of nuclear weapons.

After a large economic growth, Brazil invited different companies and consortiums to present projects for the construction of its first nuclear power plant. After receiving five different proposals, Brazil chose the one made by U.S.-based Westinghouse Electric Company involving pressurized water reactors (PWR). Simultaneously, Brazil started conversations with West Germany and a nuclear cooperation agreement was established between Brasília and Bonn.

While CNEN was finalizing the details of the contract with Westinghouse between May 1971 and April 1972, the United States Atomic Energy Commission (USAEC) approved the supply of nuclear fuel for Brazil's first nuclear power plant, Angra 1. The contract between CNEN and Westinghouse was signed in April 1972 and the construction of Angra 1 began.

=== 1973–78 ===
The military continued to push for development in the nuclear sector. The government attempted to acquire all phases of the nuclear cycle through international cooperation. In 1974, the Brazilian Company for Nuclear Technology (Companhia Brasileira de Tecnologia Nuclear – CBTN) became the Brazilian Nuclear Enterprises (Nuclebrás). Headed by Paulo Nogueira Batista, a career diplomat, Nuclebrás was charged with implementing the nuclear program by promoting the creation of indigenous companies to build parts and offer services for the nuclear plants on the pipeline. While Nuclebrás dealt with implementation and funding, CNEN retained the responsibilities of nuclear planning, regulation and inspection. Additionally, CNEN continued to be the Ministry of Mines and Energy's advisory body for domestic and international nuclear policy.

However, after India tested a nuclear device in 1974, the U.S. slowed down and eventually halted nuclear cooperation with Brazil. Also, in the aftermath of the 1973 energy crisis, USAEC made its provision of fuel to third countries subject to availability. This in turn pushed Brazil to accelerate talks with West Germany and France, eventually signing an agreement with the former on 27 June 1975, that established the transfer of operational know-how regarding reactors. The deal represented the largest technology transfer agreement ever signed between an industrialized country and an industrializing one. Bonn committed to export four to eight reactors over a span of 15 years. Likewise, West German firms agreed to construct a complete nuclear fuel cycle in Brazil: uranium prospecting and mining; uranium enrichment (using the jet-nozzle process); manufacturing fuel rods; and reprocessing spent fuel rods. For West Germany's nuclear industry, this was the most significant contract ever to be established, at an anticipated value of 10 billion marks (roughly US$4 billion). Also, this was the largest single export order in German history.

The deal caused lively international reactions. One of the main reasons for the frenzy was due to the fact that West Germany, an NPT signatory, made a commitment to transfer nuclear technology to Brazil, headed by a military dictatorship that was not party to the NPT. In the years that followed the announcement, Brazil and West Germany were under strong pressure coming from not just the U.S., but also the United Kingdom, Canada, France, and the Soviet Union—countries which supported a restrictive position on nuclear sales and strongly opposed the export of advanced nuclear technology such as fuel reprocessing plants.

In order to overcome the mounting suspicious, and after much negotiation, a tripartite agreement on nuclear safeguards was established between Brazil, West Germany and the International Atomic Energy Agency (IAEA).

Shortly after, President (General) Ernesto Geisel announced the White Book of Brazilian Nuclear Policy (Livro Branco sobre a política nuclear brasileira). The document, intended to clarify aspects of Brazil's nuclear decisions to the public, affirmed the peaceful nature of the program and justified the nuclear option based on the country's growing energy demand.

In cooperation with West Germany, the construction of the Angra 2 reactor began in 1976. However, the project faced construction delays and cost overruns that prompted public outcry within Brazil, giving way to the creation of another CPI in 1978 that looked into the nuclear deal between Brazil and West Germany.

=== The "autonomous" / "parallel" nuclear program (1978–87) ===
In 1978, amid the nuclear deal with West Germany, the growing restrictions to nuclear technology stipulated by the U.S., and the newly created Nuclear Suppliers Group (NSG), Brazil established a secret nuclear project under the coordination of CNEN and implemented by the Institute of Energy and Nuclear Research (Instituto de Pesquisas Energéticas e Nucleares – IPEN), which had replaced the IEA in São Paulo. The original objective of this project was to develop indigenous technology for the production of uranium hexafluoride (UF6).

As this project evolved to comprise an actual program, it encompassed research on all phases of nuclear energy production, the construction of a miniature reactor for naval propulsion, and the development of nuclear explosives. Known as the "Autonomous" or "Parallel" Nuclear Program, it was conducted under tight military control, with each one of the armed forces having dedicated budgets to pursue different methods for uranium enrichment. This parallel military program was conducted concomitantly with the civilian one, the latter managed by Nuclebrás. Unlike the civilian program, the autonomous one was not under safeguards.

Different branches of Brazil's armed forces had different tasks in the parallel nuclear program. The Navy, which had the most advanced nuclear center – Aramar, located in Iperó, São Paulo – coordinated two projects. Project Ciclone aimed at the development of uranium enrichment technology through the ultracentrifuge method, while Project Remo sought to create a nuclear reactor for a small naval vessel such as a submarine. The Army coordinated Project Atlântico, which tried to develop natural uranium reactors. The Air Force worked on Project Solimões, which researched laser technology for nuclear and conventional purposes as well as the development of "nuclear explosives for peaceful purposes".

In the 1980s, evidence surfaced in the press pointing to the existence of two major shafts in the Air Force base of Serra do Cachimbo, in the northern state of Pará. These raised suspicions over the Air Force's nuclear activities, as the shafts had been possibly designed as testing sites for nuclear explosives.

Personnel in charge of the secret nuclear program tried to obtain access to technology and materials in the nuclear bazaar. In the late 1970s, amid a domestic shortage of oil in Brazil, Iraq offered to supply oil at a discounted price in exchange for 80 tons of Brazilian uranium. Oral accounts indicate that Brazil accepted the offer and concluded a deal with Iraq. However, it interrupted the uranium export when the Iran–Iraq War intensified, having provided Iraq with less than a quarter of the quantity agreed.

Brazil also reportedly bought highly enriched uranium from China in the 1980s. In December 1982, then-president of CNEN, Rex Nazaré, headed a mission to China with the objective of purchasing enriched uranium from his Chinese counterparts at the China National Nuclear Corporation. Sources have indicated that, a few years later, Brazilian cylinders of hexafluoride were transported to China containing natural uranium. They returned to Brazil in a container that, supposedly, carried porcelain purchased by the First Lady Dulce Figueiredo during the presidential trip. The material was later stored at the IPEN research facility in São Paulo, where the Brazilian Navy was developing technology for uranium enrichment and reactor construction with the ultimate objective of building a nuclear-propelled submarine.

Civilian rule was re-established in the country in 1985, and the administration of President José Sarney publicly revealed two years later that Brazil had achieved uranium enrichment capacity through a secret nuclear program. While Sarney made this announcement, there is no indication that he tried to put an end to the nuclear military activities.

=== 1988–2000 ===
In 1988, Nuclebrás was folded into a newly created institution, the Brazilian Nuclear Industries (Indústrias Nucleares do Brasil – INB), which was linked to the structure of CNEN and responsible for uranium extraction, industrial treatment and processing.

In that same year, the Experimental Center of Aramar (Centro Experimental Aramar – CEA), was inaugurated in Iperó, São Paulo. Under the purview of the Brazilian Navy, the CEA remains one of the country's main nuclear facilities, where research on the development of a nuclear reactor and pilot-scale uranium enrichment activities are carried out.

Angra 1, which had its first nuclear chain reaction in 1982 and went into commercial operation in 1985, faced numerous problems. Between 1982 and 1992, operations in Angra were halted 16 times for different reasons. The inefficiency of the plant led to a widespread feeling that the nuclear deal with Westinghouse had been a poor decision. Due to the constant interruptions, the power plant of Angra 1 became known in Brazil as the vagalume, or "firefly".

Amid the unfolding political transition post-dictatorship, a new Constitution was drafted in 1987–1988, for which Brazil's nuclear development program became a focal point of debate. The article approved by the Constitutional Assembly declared: "All nuclear activity within the national territory shall only be admitted for peaceful purposes and subject to the approval of the National Congress." While current official discourse often presents this decree as a unilateral guarantee that Brazil will never build nuclear artifacts, at the time of the new Constitution Brazil was still arguing for the legality of peaceful nuclear explosions—and oral history evidence points to the notion that those drafting the constitution sought to incorporate language consistent with such technologies. Brazil would only renounce nuclear explosions in 1990, two years after the Constitution was passed.

President Fernando Collor de Mello, the first to be elected by popular vote since 1964 and the first ever to be elected after universal suffrage was enacted, officially renounced pacific nuclear explosions and held a public ceremony to seal shut the shafts located at the Air Force base in Serra do Cachimbo, Pará, in September 1990.

That same year, a CPI was established to investigate the military's autonomous nuclear program. Among the main findings were details of illicit trade of nuclear material, as well as information about illegal financial operations that had served to keep the secret program going. In its final report, the inquiry commission recommended that the parallel program be dismantled with some of its activities to be integrated into the safeguarded civilian program. It also recommended the establishment of accountability mechanisms to increase the safety and security of the program.

The economic crisis that had already affected the development of Brazilian nuclear project in the 1980s continued through the 1990s. Nuclear activities slowed down, the program for developing the nuclear submarine ground to a halt and plans to build two additional nuclear power plants were put on hold. Only in 1994 did the Brazilian government decide to resume construction of Angra 2.

=== 2001–present ===
In 2001 more than two decades after the beginning its construction, the nuclear power plant of Angra 2 started its commercial operations.

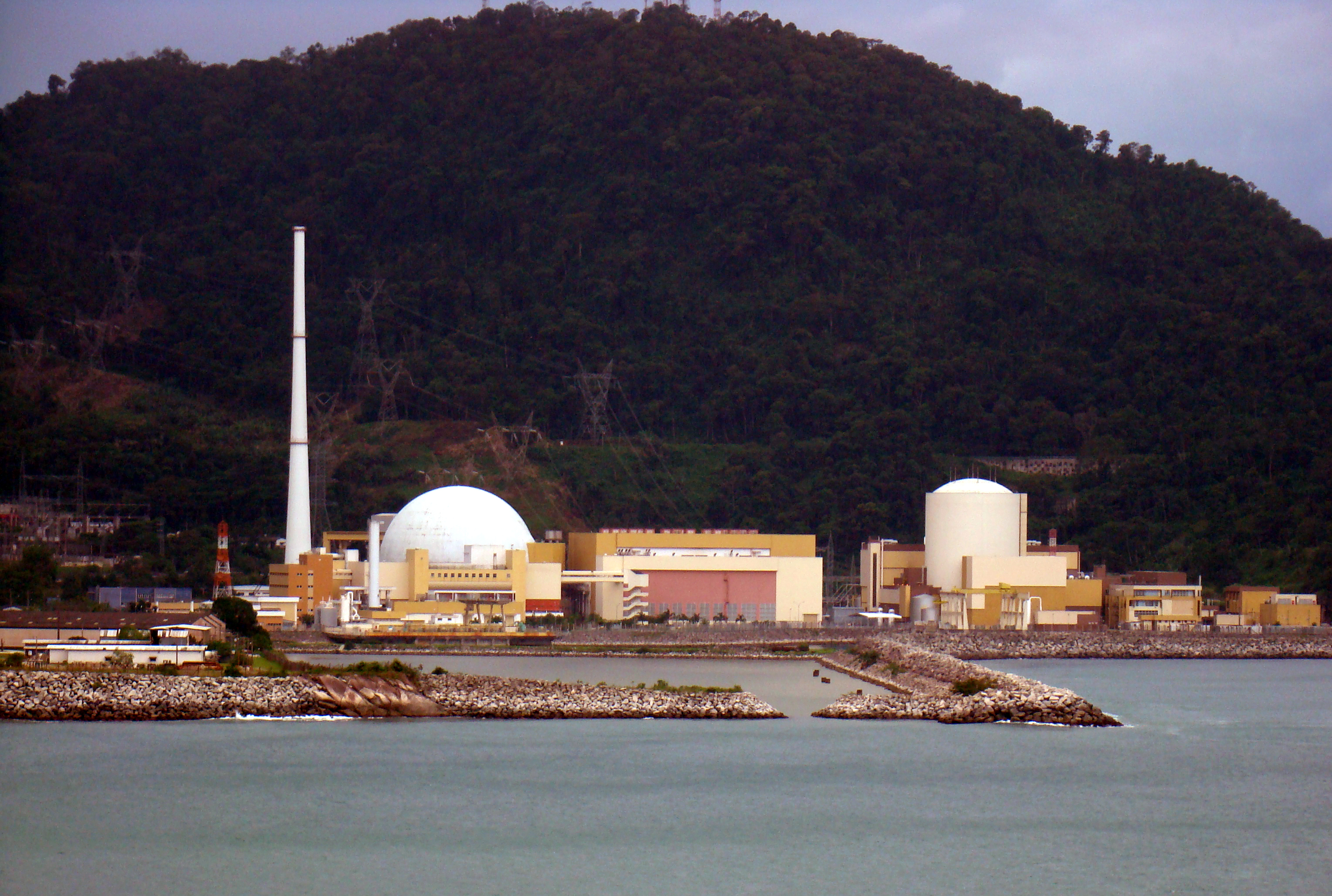
Nuclear power plant of Angra 1 and Angra 2

Under President Lula da Silva (2003–2011), the nuclear program was revived. INB's Nuclear Fuel Factory (Fábrica de Combustível Nuclear – FCN), a commercial-scale uranium enrichment facility, became operational in 2004. However, disagreements between Brazil and the IAEA regarding the inspection procedures delayed the full start of operations. Brazil was reluctant to grant IAEA inspectors full visual access to its centrifuges, which were hidden by 2-meter (6.6-foot) high panels, as Brazilian authorities argued that a superior centrifuge technology had been developed in the country and it was necessary to protect these industrial secrets. After months of impasse, Brazil agreed to allow increased – but not full – visual access to the centrifuges and other industrial equipment by reducing the size of the panels covering the machinery. As a member of the Ministry of Science and Technology reportedly said at that time, Brazil was lifting the skirt and lowering the top a little, but retaining its secrets.

Budgetary constraints also postponed the beginning of industrial enrichment operations at the FCN. In 2006, the Minister of Science and Technology officially inaugurated the complex, located in Resende, Rio de Janeiro.

A first enrichment cascade started in May 2006 at the Resende facility. A second one was activated in November 2009 and, two years later, a third cascade was made operational. Currently, there are four cascades in operation, which allow INB to enrich approximately 14% of Angra 1's annual uranium needs. The other 85% continues to be enriched overseas, mainly in Canada and Europe.

In 2007 Brazil launched the National Energy Plan 2030 (Plano Nacional de Energia 2030 – PNE 2030). This plan states the need to increase the energy production in Brazil and proposes that an additional nuclear energy capacity of 5,345 megawatts (MW) be installed by 2030. In order to make it feasible, the plan supports the completion of Angra 3 – whose construction started in 2010 and it is still underway – and recommends the construction of four nuclear power plants across the country.

In 2011, the electricity generated by the nuclear power plants of Angra 1 and Angra 2 represented 2.7% of the national energy output, approximately 14 tWh. While Angra 3 remains under construction and is expected to become operational in 2018, there have been no moves to build the four new nuclear plants as outlined by PNE 2030. In 2012, a review of the PNE 2030 was commissioned, so as to take into account the increasing share of renewable sources like wind and biomass in the Brazilian energy matrix and the consequences of the 2011 Fukushima nuclear disaster in Japan. This updated study was expected to come out in 2013, as a PNE2035. However, that did not happen. Presently, the website of EPE states that a PNE 2050 is currently in development.

Currently, there is only one active uranium mine in the country, located in Lagoa Real, Caetité, Bahia. The annual production of uranium in the Caetité Complex, which is managed by INB, has varied, with the record being 400 tons of uranium concentrate in 2008. There have been plans of developing mine activities in Santa Quitéria, Ceará, where the uranium presents itself associated with phosphate. Even though INB has undertaken some steps toward establishing this new mine, the license has not been issued yet.

In the end of 2008, President Lula signed an agreement with his French counterpart, Nicolas Sarkozy, which established a partnership between the two countries regarding defense issues. In addition to selling 50 EC-725 Super Cougar helicopters France agreed to work with Brazil to build four conventional submarines and one nuclear propulsion submarine. The US$12 billion agreement, however, excludes cooperation on the development of the nuclear reactor for the submarine, which is supposed to be accomplished by the Brazilian Navy solely. The construction of the nuclear submarine is expected to start in 2016, in the Navy's Manufacturing Unit for Metallic Structures (Unidade de Fabricação de Estruturas Metálicas – Ufem), located in Itaguaí, Rio de Janeiro. The likely date for completion is 2023 and the submarine should to start to operate in 2025.

The Brazil-France deal is in accordance with the National Defense Strategy (Estratégia Nacional de Defesa – END) that Brazil also issued in 2008. The END states Brazil's ambition to develop and master nuclear technology and conclude the nuclear propulsion submarine. The most recent White Book of National Defense, issued in 2012, states that a nuclear propulsion submarine would contribute to the protection of commercial routes, keep navigation free, help protect natural resources, and promote technological development in the country.

In February 2013, the Brazilian government announced the creation of a new state-owned company, the Blue Amazon Defense Technologies (Amazônia Azul Tecnologias de Defesa – Amazul), whose purpose is to promote, develop and maintain the technology necessary to keep the nuclear activities in Brazil going, including the nuclear reactor for the planned submarine.

In May 2013, Redetec, a Brazilian administrative body responsible for managing resources for nuclear innovation, contracted the Argentine company INVAP to build a multipurpose nuclear reactor in Brazil. The reactor is planned to enter operations in 2018, at the CEA.

== Nuclear cooperation with Argentina ==
=== Initial bilateral talks ===
Brazil and Argentina began nuclear talks in the 1940s as they started to develop their respective indigenous programs. In 1967 CNEN President Uriel da Costa Ribeiro participated in the inauguration of the Ezeiza Atomic Center in Buenos Aires. The following year, Admiral Oscar Quihillalt, president of Argentina's National Atomic Energy Commission (Comisión Nacional de Energía Atómica – CNEA) toured all Brazilian nuclear facilities. While there was no substantial progress in terms of any real cooperation, these reciprocal visits and talks set out to keep both countries informed of each other's nuclear activities.

The bilateral interaction was possible because, in many respects, Brazil and Argentina shared a common understanding of the global non-proliferation regime as a top-down imposition of the major nuclear powers at the expense of weaker nations. In fact, starting in the early 1960s the two delegations to the IAEA had a tacit agreement, through which they would take turns in the seat assigned to the South American country with the most advanced nuclear program.

In 1974, as international control over nuclear technology became more stringent, Argentina proposed a collaborative arrangement with Brazil, seeking "exchange of experiences." While the CSN considered it a positive development, then-Brazilian President (General) Ernesto Geisel conditioned any nuclear cooperation on the resolution of an outstanding dispute over the uses of the Paraná River that forms their shared border. Later that decade, when Brazil sought to push for some degree of bilateral nuclear cooperation, it was Argentina that balked, insisting the river dispute be addressed first. Its resolution in 1979 unlocked the bilateral nuclear cooperation that would unfold.

Brazil and Argentina signed their first accord on nuclear collaboration on 17 May 1980, in Buenos Aires. This agreement set out to establish scientific exchanges and collaborations on nuclear research and the development of nuclear energy for peaceful purposes.

Brazil and Argentina's position on the global non-proliferation regime was quite similar. From the second half of the 1960s onward, both countries understood they should jointly resist external pressure applied to their respective nuclear programs. This common understanding was a major source for bilateral nuclear cooperation and helped dilute any security dilemma dynamics between the two countries.

There is evidence that mutual awareness of each other's nuclear activities was higher than estimated by outsiders, partly due to the existence of vast networks of scientists and military officials among both countries.

In 1983, Argentina announced it had achieved uranium enrichment capability through gas diffusion in its Pilcaniyeu plant, located at Río Negro Province. Before the public announcement, Argentina's ruling military junta had sent a letter to President João Figueiredo confidentially informing their Brazilian counterpart of the news, to which Figueiredo replied with satisfaction at the Argentine accomplishment.

=== The path to mutual inspections ===
The first proposal for a joint Brazilian-Argentine safeguards system was presented in 1977 by then-U.S. Congressman Paul Findley during a press conference in Washington. This declaration was soon followed by an opinion piece entitled, "Chances for a Latin Nuclear Agreement," authored by Findley in The Washington Post.

Findley wrote in a personal capacity and his opinions were not endorsed by any U.S. political party, but they did present an alternative to then-U.S. President Jimmy Carter's approach to nuclear proliferation in Latin America. Findley's Washington Post article argued that "a bilateral, on-site, nuclear verification agreement between Argentina and Brazil could help to arrest mounting suspicion over the ultimate nuclear aspirations of these two important states." The congressman first advocated for the common rejection of PNEs, followed by the "continuing, mutual, on-site monitoring of their respective nuclear facilities." Findley did not consider a bilateral arrangement as a substitute for the IAEA verification regime, but as an "additional element of assurance and protection between two states whose past relations have at time been quite troubled."

Findley's proposal did not align with the Brazilian government. At the time, Brazilian diplomat Luiz Felipe Lampreia stated that Brazil was part of multilateral safeguards structures, which he argued was the right path to enhance nuclear security. Lampreia also added that, since Findley's proposal was not endorsed by the U.S. government, there was no need for Brazil to issue a formal response.

In the following years, Brazilian and Argentine diplomats exchanged views on renouncing peaceful nuclear explosions and establishing a bilateral nuclear agreement. The talks started in late 1983 between Saraiva Guerreiro and Dante Caputo, the Brazilian and Argentine foreign ministers, respectively. Then, Ambassadors Roberto Abdenur and Jorge F. Sábato were tasked to continue the dialogue in 1984.

Once the proposal was examined in detail by high ranks in both governments, the Brazilians decided they could not commit to it. Abdenur informed his counterpart about the lack of consensus inside Brazil, but reiterated that Brazil's rejection of the joint proposal should not be interpreted as an ambition to conduct PNEs.

In May 1985 in Buenos Aires, Caputo met with Olavo Setúbal, Guerreiro's successor. Part of their agenda consisted of the potentiality of negotiating a mutual safeguards system and jointly renouncing the option PNEs. Argentina stepped up the pressure and, six months later, Argentine President Raúl Alfonsín and Brazilian President José Sarney met in Foz do Iguaçu, Paraná, Brazil. On that occasion, Alfonsín proposed the establishment of a joint safeguards regime, to which Sarney countered with a more diluted proposal to establish a bilateral working group to discuss the issue. Alfonsín agreed and the Foz do Igauçu Joint Declaration on Nuclear Policy (Declaração Conjunta sobre Política Nuclear de Foz de Iguaçu) was signed on 29 November 1985.

In the following year, cooperation among the two countries intensified, evidenced by new joint protocols and declarations. In a move to increase transparency and trust as much as "lock in" the Brazilian side, President Alfonsín invited President Sarney to visit the Pilcaniyeu nuclear power plant, which was considered a cause for concern in Brazil. After 17 July 1987, visit, the two presidents issued the Viedma Joint Declaration on Nuclear Policy, expressing the importance of building mutual trust and reiterating the peaceful nature of nuclear activities in both countries.

Before publicly announcing that Brazil had achieved uranium enrichment capacity, Sarney sent Ambassador Rubens Ricupero as an envoy to Buenos Aires to personally inform Alfonsín. In April 1988, Sarney invited Alfonsín to participate in the inauguration of the Experimental Center of Aramar in Iperó, São Paulo. On that occasion, the two countries issued the Declaration of Iperó, which raised the status of the joint working group on nuclear issues, which had been created in 1985, to a permanent committee, thereby institutionalizing the former ad hoc body and establishing regular meetings.

In November 1988, following another joint presidential visit – this time to the Argentine nuclear plant in Ezeiza, Buenos Aires – the two heads of state issued the Ezeiza Declaration, which emphasized the peaceful purpose of both countries’ nuclear programs, pledged to continue "exchange of information, experiences and technical visits," and vowed to improve bilateral nuclear cooperation.

Sarney and Alfonsín were succeeded by Fernando Collor de Mello and Carlos Menem, respectively, and the latter two continued the bilateral collaboration. They met in Foz de Iguaçu in November 1990, when they signed the Declaration of Common Nuclear Policy (Declaração de Política Nuclear Comum). The document created the Common System for Accountability and Control (Sistema Comum de Contabilidade e Controle – SCCC), which would coordinate reciprocal inspections of nuclear facilities. This declaration also stated both countries’ willingness to commence negotiations with the IAEA on the implementation of nuclear safeguards and later join the regional regime of a nuclear-weapon-free zone of Latin America and the Caribbean as laid out by the Treaty of Tlatelolco.

To coordinate and implement the SCCC, the two countries created, in 1991, the Brazilian-Argentine Agency for Accounting and Control of Nuclear Materials (Agência Brasileiro-Argentina de Contabilidade e Controle de Materiais Nucleares – ABACC), established through the Guadalajara Bilateral Agreement for the Exclusively Peaceful Use of Nuclear Energy (Accordo Bilateral para Usos Exclusivamente Pacíficos da Energia Nuclear). ABACC was the first binational organization set up by Argentina and Brazil and to date remains the only existing binational safeguards organization in the world.

In December 1991, the Quadripartite Agreement was established among Brazil, Argentina, the ABACC and the IAEA. It regulated IAEA inspections in Brazil and Argentina, while recognizing the SCCC and stating the need to avoid duplication of work between ABACC and the IAEA. The accord came into force in 1994 and it has been in force since then.

Aside from cooperation on the nuclear energy front, Brazil and Argentina were also taking steps to promote economic integration, as demonstrated by the 1988 Treaty of Integration, Cooperation and Development (Tratado de Integração, Cooperação e Desenvolvimento) and the 1990 Minute of Buenos Aires (Ata de Buenos Aires). A common market – known as MERCOSUR / MERCOSUL – between Brazil, Argentina, Paraguay and Uruguay would be created in 1991 with the signing of the Treaty of Asunción.

=== Recent developments ===
On 22 February 2008, Brazil and Argentina announced the intention to build a binational nuclear fuel factory. A bilateral working group was then established to discuss this project, but no further developments have taken place.

In 2011, ABACC turned 20 years old and hosted an anniversary seminar, in Rio de Janeiro.

On 6 May 2013, as part of the 2008 agreements, Redetec, a Brazilian administrative body responsible for managing resources for nuclear innovation, contracted Argentine company INVAP to build a multipurpose nuclear reactor in Brazil.

It is expected that the Brazilian reactor will follow the Open-pool Australian lightwater reactor (OPAL) model, developed by INVAP for Australia. OPAL is used for research and for the production radioisotopes employed in nuclear medicine, industry, agriculture and environment.

The agreed period for completion is 12 months and the amount paid by CNEN is R$24.7 million (US$12.02 million). The Multipurpose reactor will be stationed at the Marine Technology Center in São Paulo (Centro Tecnológico da Marinha em São Paulo – CTMSP), where the proper infrastructure will be built by the Brazilian company Intertechne. Taking into consideration the complexity of the construction project and all its necessary safety and security requirements, the reactor is expected to become operational in 2018. The total cost of this project is estimated to be US$500 million.

== Brazil and the nuclear non-proliferation regime ==
=== Opposition to the NPT ===
While Brazil participated actively in the international negotiations that led to the establishment of the NPT, it abstained from voting on the resolution that formally created the treaty. Brazilian government believed the NPT would inhibit technological and scientific progress of developing nations and consolidate the countries with nuclear weapons as a privileged minority in the international system.

Brazil refused to sign the NPT for decades, conducting nuclear activities that were either under ad hoc safeguards agreements (e.g., the 1975 trilateral agreement between Brazil, West Germany, and the IAEA) or under no safeguards at all, such as the "autonomous" / "parallel" program.

During the final months of Gerald Ford's U.S. presidency, there were negotiations between then-U.S. Under Secretary of State Charles W. Robinson and President Geisel, in which the U.S. proposed that Brazil abandon the sensitive part of its nuclear deal with Bonn in exchange for a package of substantial economic aid and nuclear assistance from Washington. The two countries reached an informal agreement that would lead to further confidential negotiations.

Amidst Geisel's decision, Brazil was beginning to experience an economic crisis. Additionally, the implementation of the nuclear plan with Bonn had some technical difficulties and the possibility loomed of West Germany diluting certain elements of the treaty in accordance with U.S. wishes. Nonetheless, Geisel asked Robinson to keep this agreement secret, as a way to avoid domestic criticisms coming from the military hardliners and the Brazilian public, which supported "national nuclear independence."

The U.S. presidential election in November 1976 saw Ford's defeat by challenger Jimmy Carter, the latter having adopted a different approach to nuclear cooperation. Ahead of Carter's January 1977 inauguration, the Geisel administration indicated during meetings with Carter's transition team that Brazil was willing to renounce nuclear sensitive technologies. U.S. officials knew that a key aspect for the acceptance of an indefinite deferral of the sensitive aspects of the nuclear project was "to convince Brazil of the durability of its fuel supply."

However, a problem occurred when an off-the-record comment by Joseph Nye, then Carter's Assistant Secretary of State for nuclear affairs, was reproduced in a newspaper article. Nye had stated that Brazil and West Germany would renounce the transfer of sensitive nuclear technology, such as enrichment and reprocessing plants, in exchange for the guarantee of nuclear fuel deliveries to Brazil. Hardliners within Brazil's military regime strongly opposed those terms, which led the government to reject the U.S. proposal and harden its anti-NPT stance.

After the end of military rule in 1985, a new Constitution was approved in 1988 that remains in force today. The document affirms that "all nuclear activity within the national territory shall only be admitted for peaceful purposes and subject to the approval of the National Congress." The international community did not view this language as a reassurance, as the wording could be construed as an endorsement of PNEs.

Elected president by popular vote in 1989, Fernando Collor voiced his opposition to nuclear weapons and rejected the idea of Brazil ever conducting PNEs. In a public rebuke of the military's nuclear activities, Collor held a ceremony in September 1990 to seal shut the nuclear explosive test shafts at the Air Force base in Serra do Cachimbo, Pará.

During the early 1990s, the "autonomous" / "parallel" program was dismantled with some of its projects and facilities being integrated to the safeguarded one. Although a CPI established in 1990 uncovered some of the clandestine nuclear activities that had been undertaken, the government did not issue an official account of all facilities, materials and activities involved in the covert program.

While Collor was open to international cooperation and favored Brazilian integration in several multilateral institutions, there were no indications that he intended to sign the NPT. Indeed, Brazil would only accede to the non-proliferation regime in 1998, six years after Collor left office.

=== Critical adhesion to the international nuclear regime ===
Brazil and Argentina's joint collaborations became integrated with larger multilateral parties via the 1991 Quadripartite Agreement with IAEA and ABACC. The agreement entered into force in 1994, the same year as Brazil's full adhesion to the Treaty of Tlatelolco, an accord that prohibited nuclear weapons in Latin America and the Caribbean.

The following year, Brazil attended the 1995 NPT Review Conference with observer status. On that occasion, the majority of the voting parties decided to indefinitely extend the treaty. Also in 1995, President Fernando Henrique Cardoso announced Brazil's decision to accede to the Missile Technology Control Regime (MTCR) and, thus, abstain from the production, acquisition or transfer of long-range missiles.

In 1996, with the support of the U.S., Brazil was accepted as a member of the Nuclear Suppliers Group (NSG), after adjusting its internal legislation on dual-use equipment to the standards required by the group. For Luiz Felipe Lampreia, Brazil's foreign minister at the time, membership in the NSG was a crucial step in the gradual process of rapprochement with the international community due to Brazil's aspirations for a larger role in international nuclear trade.

Shortly after becoming a member of the NSG, Brazil signed the Comprehensive Nuclear-Test-Ban Treaty (CTBT) on 24 September 1996, and deposited its instrument of ratification in July 1998.

Brazil finally adhered to the NPT in 1998, and deposited its instrument of accession for the treaty on 18 September, of that year during a ceremony at the U.S. State Department. On that occasion, then-U.S. Secretary of State Madeleine Albright lauded Brazil and its representative, Minister Lampreia, for its decision to accede to the NPT.

As Lampreia would state, one of the Brazil's motivations for NPT accession was the belief that it would boost Brazil's international credibility. Additionally, Argentina had already joined the regime in 1995 and its membership consisted of nearly every country in the world. Accordingly, Brazil did not want to remain isolated.

However, the legislative decree that formalized Brazilian's adhesion to the NPT linked it to the understanding that Article VI of the Treaty – which stipulated negotiations in good faith to cease the nuclear arms race and achieve nuclear disarmament, and the outcome of a treaty on complete disarmament under strict and effective international controls - would be fulfilled. Even though Brazil decided to join the regime, it continued to criticize the slow pace of disarmament and demanded balance between the obligation of non-proliferation and the obligation of disarmament.

Brazil has been part of the New Agenda Coalition (NAC), a group comprising seven states concerned with the lack of progress in nuclear disarmament, since the coalition's inception in 1998.

Considering itself as "the most active country regarding the nuclear disarmament cause," Brazil affirmed in its 2008 National Defense Strategy that "[it] will not adhere to amendments to the Treaty on the Non-Proliferation of Nuclear Weapons extending the restrictions of the Treaty, until the nuclear weapon states advance in the central premise of the Treaty: their own nuclear disarmament." In this sense, Brazil refuses to sign the Additional Protocol (AP), a voluntary legal instrument that complements comprehensive safeguards agreements and provides the IAEA broader rights of access to sites.

Brazilian attitude toward the nuclear order is underscored by its strong defense of the right of any NPT signatory to nuclear technology for peaceful purposes, as was demonstrated on the occasion of the 2010 Tehran Declaration between Brazil, Turkey and Iran.

=== Safeguards ===
The nuclear safeguards in place in Brazil are under the oversight of ABACC and the IAEA, per the provisions of the 1991 Quadripartite Agreement. There are 25 facilities in Brazil under the ABACC and IAEA safeguards.

As a verification measure of Brazil's declared nuclear material and nuclear-related activities, ABACC and IAEA perform different types of inspections – including unannounced, short-notice, and physical inventory verification – and carry out ongoing monitoring and evaluation.

There were tensions between ABACC and the IAEA in 2004, when Brazil refused to allow IAEA inspectors to see the Resende facility's equipment on the grounds that Brazil needed to protect its commercial secrets. After months of impasse, Brazilian authorities reportedly agreed to allow increased – but not full – visual access to the centrifuges and other industrial equipment.

Another source of conflict has been Brazil's refusal to sign the Additional Protocol (AP), a voluntary legal instrument that complements comprehensive safeguards agreements and provides the IAEA broader rights of access to sites. Despite the pressures coming from the IAEA and some nuclear weapon states that consider the AP a fundamental instrument of the verification regime, Brazil has strongly opposed it.

In the past few years, there have been discussions within the NSG about the establishment of the AP as a requirement to export items related to sensitive nuclear fuel cycle activities. In 2011, NSG members came to an agreement on this issue, recognizing the Quadripartite Agreement between Brazil, Argentina and the IAEA as a temporary alternative to the AP.

=== A Brazilian bomb ===
While Brazil was conducting its nuclear activities outside of the nuclear non-proliferation regime, many in the international community doubted its stated peaceful intention. In addition to Brazil's refusal to sign the NPT, the fact that the country was ruled by a hard-line military regime fuelled the suspicion that Brasília was pursuing a nuclear bomb. This opinion was manifested openly and implicitly by different nations as well as the international anti-nuclear movement. The most vehement of skeptics was the U.S., with countries like France, Canada, the UK and the Soviet Union also following suit in their doubts of Brazil.

Domestically, the lack of transparency in the Brazilian government and the little information made available about the nuclear program also led some people to believe that the military government would move forward with weaponization. Environmentalists, peace activists and members of the political opposition voiced their condemnation to the idea.

The suspicion intensified in the second half of the 1980s. As domestic media reports were published, uncovering secret nuclear developments, rumors about a possible Brazilian nuclear test emerged. One of the main Brazilian newspapers, Folha de S. Paulo, published an interview in April 1985 with a retired military officer who stated that the government planned to develop a nuclear device and explode it in 1990. During that same period, international papers denounced covert nuclear activities in Brazil, which reignited external questioning of its nuclear aspirations.

Eric Ehrmann and Christopher Barton discussed Brazil's nuclear cooperation with Iraq in 1992, and noted the views of CIA Director Robert Gates to wit that Brazil has the capability to sell nuclear technology to Iran and that issues regarding dual use deals would drive the cost of maintaining global security upward.

In the 1990s, the country created the bilateral ABACC commission with Argentina, signed the Quadripartite Agreement with the IAEA, adhered to the NPT, and reiterated its peaceful nuclear ambitions on several occasions.

The Lula administration (2003–2011) resuscitated the dormant Brazilian nuclear program, issued new investments in achieving industrial-scale uranium enrichment capacity and revived the nuclear-propulsion submarine project.

Despite Brazil's repeated claims of peaceful nuclear development, in 2003, Science and Technology Minister Roberto Amaral made a controversial statement. During an interview with popular Brazilian daily O Globo, Amaral stated that Brazil should seek to obtain all nuclear knowledge and know-how; when asked if his description included the knowledge to develop a nuclear bomb, he replied positively. After the statement was disseminated across national and international media, Amaral refuted it and called it a misunderstanding.

One year later, Brazil denied IAEA inspectors full visual access to the Resende enrichment plant's centrifuges, which led to months of Brazil–IAEA disagreements. The two parties finally reached a compromise for Brazil to reduce the size of the panels covering the machinery. Nonetheless, Brazil's reluctance to these verification measures and constant refusal to sign the Additional Protocol have been interpreted by some as an attempt to hide undeclared activities. There were also rumors stating that the reason for concealing parts of the centrifuges was to hide technology Brazil had covertly obtained in the past, "possibly the Urenco G-2 design from Germany or another design from Pakistan."

In 2008, Brazil issued its National Defense Strategy (Estratégia Nacional de Defesa), in which it reaffirmed its ambition to develop and master nuclear technology and conclude the nuclear-propulsion submarine. That year, Brazil established a cooperation agreement with France to construct the submarine. Even though the two countries will collaborate on this project, the nuclear reactor for the submarine is excluded from the contract and should be built by the Brazilian Navy on its own.

Today, as a non-nuclear-weapon state party to the NPT, Brazil has the right under international norms to manufacture a naval reactor and produce highly enriched uranium to fuel it. While that has not happened yet, the possibility of Brazil enriching uranium at a level higher than the 20-percent threshold and employing it at a military facility has prompted continued concerns over its nuclear intentions.

Vice President José Alencar (2003–11) made controversial remarks in 2009, telling the press that Brazil should have nuclear weapons as a means to protect itself. According to Alencar, nuclear weapons were useful as a means of dissuasion, particularly in the case of a vast country with valuable natural resources such as Brazil. Additionally, Alencar linked the possession of a nuclear bomb to higher international relevance, stating that a poor country like Pakistan had its voice heard in international affairs because of its nuclear arsenal. Once his observations were mass-produced, Brasília affirmed that Alencar had expressed his own personal views, which did not reflect Brazil's official position.

International experts have also weighed in on the controversies surrounding Brazil's nuclear program. Hans Rühle, a former official from the German defense ministry who also worked with the North Atlantic Treaty Organization (NATO) wrote an article in 2010 in which he indicated that Brazil might be on the path toward getting the bomb. He based his argument on the submarine project, which may involve the production of highly enriched uranium, and the fact that Brazil seeks to develop capacity to conduct all phases of the nuclear fuel cycle indigenously. While Rühle affirms that there is no hard proof of a nuclear weapons program in Brazil, he suggests that Brazil's relations with Iran and defense of the Iranian nuclear program should be seen as a clue of the path Brazil wants to tread. Commenting on Rühle's article, the Argentine scholars Federico Merke and Florencia Montal said that Brazil might develop the capacity to manufacture a bomb but that it didn't seem to have the intention to do so.

The most recent White Book of National Defense (Livro Branco de Defesa Nacional), issued in 2012 and published by the ministry of defense, reaffirms Latin America as a nuclear-weapons-free zone and states Brazil's support for nuclear disarmament. The white paper also states that the nuclear-propulsion submarine would contribute to the protection of commercial routes, keep navigation free, help protect natural resources, and promote technological development in the country.

The white paper, on top of myriad official explanations, has not curbed the domestic and international public of suspecting Brazil's nuclear intentions. For instance, the Argentine edition of Le Monde Diplomatique, published an article in its Spanish-language edition dated from February 2013 and titled, "Brasil, ¿detrás de la bomba atómica?" (Brazil: Behind the Atomic Bomb)?, Despite other similarly expressed pieces of skepticism, the evidence remains inconclusive that a nuclear weapons program is underway in Brazil.

== Main controversies ==
=== American criticism of the Brazil – West Germany nuclear deal and the Carter crusade ===
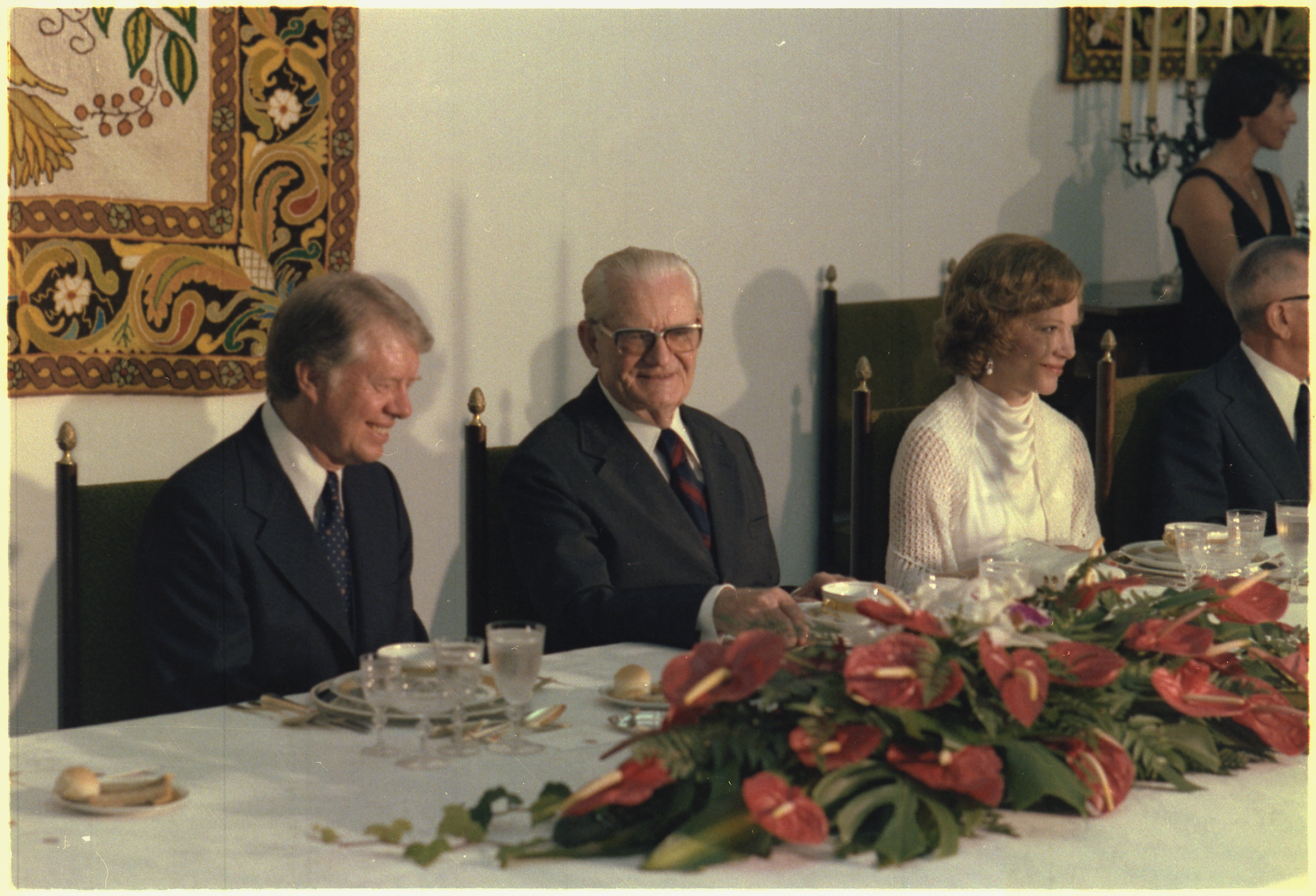
President Geisel hosts a State Dinner for Jimmy Carter and Rosalynn Carter in 1978

As a response to India's nuclear test conducted 18 May 1974, the United States adopted more restrictive policies regulating the transfer of nuclear fuel and related technologies to different countries, including Brazil. In addition to suspending USAEC contracts of uranium supply, U.S. officials also pressed the European Atomic Energy Community (Euratom) Supply Agency to cease all transfers of special nuclear material to Brazil. Likewise, the U.S. pushed West Germany to remove ultracentrifugation technology from its agreement with Brazil and tried to craft a complementary safeguards agreement with the IAEA.

During the 1976 presidential campaign, Jimmy Carter voiced strong criticisms of the Brazil-West Germany deal as well as the Gerald Ford administration's handling of the matter. In Carter's view, a more assertive stance on non-proliferation was necessary.

Once he assumed office in January 1977, Carter dispatched his vice president, Walter Mondale, to West Germany for his first official visit. In Bonn, Mondale met with President Helmut Schmidt to discuss the Carter administration's efforts to prevent nuclear proliferation. Mondale suggested to Schmidt that the West German-Brazilian agreement be suspended temporarily for review. Although Schmidt did not fully embrace it, Mondale's proposal was badly received in Brazil and led to complications in U.S.-Brazil relations.

In June 1977, U.S. First Lady Rosalynn Carter visited Brazil and met with Geisel and his foreign minister, Azeredo da Silveira, in Brasília. Mrs. Carter was accompanied by Robert Pastor, U.S. National Security Advisor for Latin America, and Joseph Nye, Assistant Secretary of State for nuclear affairs. Although Mrs. Carter and Geisel talked about non-proliferation and the Treaty of Tlateloco, no substantive agreements on nuclear policy were created during this visit.

In the following year, President Carter signed into law the Nuclear Non-Proliferation Act, reducing U.S. production of plutonium and further restricting exports of nuclear fuel. As a consequence, Brazil was required to adopt comprehensive safeguards on all its nuclear facilities in order to receive from the U.S. the first delivery of replacement nuclear fuel for the Angra 1 nuclear power plant.

The constraints imposed by external actors led to significant delays in the construction of nuclear plants and represented high political and technological costs for the Brazilian government. In this context, in 1978 Brazil decided to carry out covert nuclear activities—in essence, the beginning of its "Autonomous" / "Parallel" nuclear program.

=== Problems related to mining, storage and transportation of radioactive material ===
==== Minas Gerais ====
The Ore Treatment Unit (Unidade de Tratamento de Minério – UTM) in the rural area of Caldas, Minas Gerais (MG), was active from 1982 to 1995. During that period, 1,200 tons of yellowcake were produced in order to provide fuel for Angra 1.

Since its decommissioning, Caldas’ mine pit, which is approximately 180 meters (590 feet) deep and contains a diameter of about 1,200 meters (3,937 feet), has turned into a giant lake of acid water. Additionally, radioactive residues remain in the unit – approximately 11,000 tons of torta 2, a combination of uranium concentrate and thorium, and thousands of tons of mesothorium – making Caldas the country's biggest radioactive waste deposit.

Local residents and politicians have expressed their concern about the health and environmental impact of the radioactive waste and the acid water. So far, there is no available technology to neutralize the water and mitigate its environmental and health risks.

There have also been complaints about incidences of cancer, where the amount of those affected is higher than the average for Minas Gerais. Similarly, a recent study points to an excessive number of cancer-related deaths in the part of the state where uranium extraction is occurring.

The poor condition of the storage facilities led to a judicial ruling in 2011 that fined the INB, ordered it to treat the mining residues, and mandated that company must provide regular analyses of the radiation levels in the soil, animals, plants, groundwater and rivers that run through the city.

In 2000, 15 years after uranium mining activities had ceased in Caldas, radioactive residues of torta 2 and mesothorium from decommissioned plants in São Paulo were to be transported to Caldas, where they would be stored. Amid popular mobilizations against it, then-MG Governor Itamar Franco issued a decree prohibiting the entry of radioactive waste into MG from other states. The radioactive material remains stored in São Paulo.

==== Bahia ====
The sole active mine in Brazil, the Uranium Concentrate Unit (Unidade de Concentrado de Urânio – URA), is located in Bahia, possessing an estimated 100,000 tons of uranium reserves. This amount could supply the three Angra power plants currently in operation, in addition to four other planned ones, until the end of their life cycles. Since 1998, when mining activities started in Caetité, annual uranium production at URA has varied; it peaked in 2008, when 400 tons of uranium concentrated were produced.

Mining activity in Caetité has generated detrimental environmental effects, including contamination of water in nearby districts. An independent study commissioned by international environmental Non-governmental organization (NGO) Greenpeace showed that the concentration of uranium in some wells located 8 kilometers away from the uranium mine, in the district of Juazeiro, BA, was seven times higher than the limit established by the World Health Organization (WHO).

In April 2010, the Institute for Water and Climate Management (Instituto de Gestão das Águas e Clima – INGA), the agency responsible for water and climate management within the Bahia state government, recommended shutting down the water fountain that served Juazeiro due to the district's high uranium levels. A few months later, a technical mission led by Dhesca Brasil, a network of human rights organizations, observed that the fountain continued to be in use and the residents had not been informed about the risks of consuming its water.

In May 2011, after learning that 13 trucks loaded with radioactive material were about to leave from São Paulo to Caetité, local residents and activists asked for official explanations and requested that safety measures be taken. In a letter sent to local authorities, the claimers inquired about the nature of the material being transported, why it was destined for Caetité, potential risks associated with the transportation, and whether proper permission had been granted.

When their letter went unanswered, the population organized a vigil constituting thousands of people. More than 3,000 protestors made a human chain and impeded 13 trucks from coming into the city. INB published a note in its website claiming that the cargo consisted of chemical compounds of uranium, coming from the Navy Technological Center (Centro Tecnológico da Marinha em São Paulo – CTMSP) to Caetité to be repackaged. The message further revealed that the final destination would be Europe for enrichment purposes. After four days of impasse, the parties came to an agreement and the material proceeded to the URA in Caetité.

==== Ceará ====
Another uranium mining complex, known as Itataia, is underway in Santa Quitéria, Ceará. Itataia is supposed to be the largest uranium reserve in Brazil, containing 79,319 tons of the mineral. In the first years of extraction, the expected annual uranium production capacity is 1,200 tons per year. But projections assert that after the fifth year, this figure should rise to 1,600 tons annually.

In 2008, officials stated that mining activities in Itataia would begin in 2013. The first of its type, this would be a joint venture between state-owned INB and Brazilian private construction company Galvani. The latter would be in charge of the mining activities, extracting phosphate for fertilizer production and separating it from uranium, which Galvani would pass on to INB. However, since federal authorities have requested further studies of environmental impact, activities have been delayed.

==== Goiás ====
The remaining radioactive waste from the 1987 radiological accident in Goiânia, Goiás, was quickly transferred to the nearby city of Abadia, generating resistance from local residents suspicious of risks associated with nuclear material. It has been reported that people from neighboring cities avoided Abadia's citizens, fearing radioactive contamination.

After a decade of provisional storage, the material was moved to a permanent deposit built within the state park of Telma Ortegal, which has an area of 1.6 million m^{2} (17.2 million ft^{2}). The structure housing the deposit was designed to last for 300 years and withstand eventual disasters.

==== São Paulo ====
Currently, there are approximately 1,150 tons of radioactive residues – primarily uranium and thorium – stored among 80 tons of heavy mineral sand in Interlagos, a busy neighborhood in the city of São Paulo. This material is reminiscent of the monazite plants of Santo Amaro (Usan) and Interlagos (Usin), which were deactivated in the 1990s.

In 2000, the remaining radioactive waste was supposed to go the mining unit of Caldas (MG), where the residues of Usan and Usin were usually disposed. However, popular pressure against it led then-MG Governor Itamar Franco to issue a decree prohibiting radioactive waste from coming into the state. Faced with this restriction, the residues remained in São Paulo.

The storage building in Interlagos has been criticized for its poor signage and safety protocols. There are few signs indicating radiation in the area, but they are small and some are covered by grass. According to Fernanda Giannasi, a public auditor from the Ministry of Labor, there are holes in the fence surrounding the building, which means people can enter the site. Giannasi has also noted risks faced by employees at the storage building. There are also complaints concerning the lack of instructions to residents in the vicinity advising certain steps in case of a radiological accident.

When Usin was built, the population of the surrounding area was less dense. And the human presence in the area is expected to increase; the Santuário Theotokos Mãe de Deus, a large church with a capacity of 20,000 worshippers that will rise to 100,000 upon the completion of its construction, has been built only 300 meters (984 feet) away from the radioactive waste site.

The company in charge of the uranium production in São Paulo was the former Nuclemon Mínero-Química, which has now been absorbed into INB. In 2007, the Brazilian Labor Court mandated that INB provide lifelong, free health insurance to the former workers of Nuclemon. This verdict was the outcome of a long lawsuit, which argued that throughout the 1980s and 1990s Nuclemon workers had no substantial information about the risks they faced and were constantly exposed to radioactive and toxic substances.

A report from a parliamentary working group on nuclear safety noticed that, even though Brazil signed and ratified the International Labour Organization (ILO) Radiation Protection Convention (No. 115), it has not provided national measures that implement Article 12, which obliges signatories to commit medical services to former workers who have been in contact with radioactive substances. Discussions to implement Article 12 have been ongoing in Brazil's federal legislative body since 2006.

=== Radiological accidents and incidents ===
- In 1986, roughly 20,000 to 25,000 liters of radioactive water accidentally leaked from the Angra 1 nuclear power plant, becoming a front-page story on the popular Brazilian daily Folha de S. Paulo on 9 October.
- In September 1987, a radioactive accident occurred in Goiânia, Goiás, after a radiotherapy device was stolen from an abandoned hospital site in the city. As different people subsequently handled it, men, women, children, animals, and plants were contaminated. In the cleanup operation, topsoil had to be removed from several sites and entire houses were demolished, with their contents removed, examined and eventually destroyed. According to the official account, about 112,000 people were examined for radioactive contamination, 297 were found to have significant levels of radioactive material in or on their body, and 4 people died. However, these numbers are in dispute, as a victims’ association argues these statistics do not take into consideration the subsequent injuries and deaths resulting from the Goiânia accident.
- In April 2000, there was a leak of 5,000 m3 (176,573 ft3) of uranium liquor at the Lagoa Real industrial mining complex, located in Caetité, Bahia. INB, the company responsible for the facility, tried to keep the accident secret, but nine employees broke their silence six months later and informed authorities. In turn, INB was fined R$119,130 (US$57,600) and had its activities suspended from November 2000 to July 2001.
- On 28 May 2001, another leak of radioactive water occurred at Angra 1, this time 22,000 liters and attributed to human error. Authorities considered it a minor accident and stated that the workers and the residents of the area did not face contamination risks.
- In October 2001, uranium hexafluoride gas leaked at the Resende fuel factory due to a failure of the facility's safety and detection system. This radioactive, lethal gas invaded a 60 m2 (646 ft2) room but was contained. According to news reports, the gas leak did not affect any of the 450 workers or the 8,000 residents of the nearest district. However, the communities in the area nearby complained about not being informed about the accident.
- In April 2002, two INB workers told Caetité's Radio Educadora that another leak of uranium liquor had happened at "Area 170" but was being kept as a secret by INB.
- In Caetité, between January and June 2004 the reservoir for radioactive water flooded seven times, which spread liquid effluents of uranium-238, thorium-232 and radium-226 to the Riacho das Vacas creek and the surrounding environment. This accident motivated in loco, or on-the-spot, inspections of CNEN's Coordination of Nuclear Facilities (Coordenação de Instalações Nucleares – CODIN). The inspectors produced a technical report which listed various irregularities, such as constant overflows of contaminated water and inadequate excavation measures, which could lead to landslides and lack of hydro-geological studies to prevent the contaminated water from reaching the groundwater. Despite the critiques of the report, Caetité's mining license was renewed. According to an article in Folha de S.Paulo, the report authors resigned from their positions.
- On 15 May 2009, a human error during a decontamination procedure at Angra 2 resulted in the release radioactive particles, affecting – but not severely contaminating – the six workers located near the incident site. Even though the Brazilian company in charge of nuclear energy production Eletrobras Eletronuclear claimed to have reported the accident to relevant authorities when it occurred, news about it only surfaced the media 11 days later.
- In Caetité, on 2 May 2010, a pipe broke at INB and 900 liters of uranium liquor spilled onto the soil.
- On 18 October 2012, an operational fault at the INB mine in Caetité, poured roughly 100 kilograms (220 pounds) of uranium onto the ground. INB claimed that it followed requisite protocol and cleaned the area.
- On 26 June 2013, a man who works for INB as a night watchman at Caetité's Uranium Concentrate Unit fell into a pool filled with 20,000 m^{3} of radioactive fluids. The incident became public through a local NGO, which reported the worker's fall and denounced the insufficient safety measures in place at the uranium plant; such as the absence of guardrails around radioactive storage pools. After the event made the news, INB released a note in which the company affirmed it had granted medical assistance to the worker. According to this statement, the worker went through checkups and his health has not been affected.

=== Oversight, control and nuclear security ===
While CNEN is responsible for promoting and fostering nuclear industry in Brazil, it also supervises and regulates the country's nuclear sector—a duality of responsibilities that can undermine the independence of the supervision system. It has also been pointed out that this goes against Article 8 of the Convention on Nuclear Safety, which states that

"each Contracting Party shall take the appropriate steps to ensure an effective separation between the functions of the regulatory body and those of any other body or organization concerned with the promotion or utilization of nuclear energy."

Brazil has been a signatory to that accord since 2 June 1997.

Since early 2013, the Brazilian government is weighing a proposal to establish a nuclear regulatory agency. Some in the nuclear sector have voiced their support for the measure, which would separate regulation, licensing and control of nuclear activities from the fomentation, promotion and support for research and production of nuclear energy.

=== Transparency ===
From the outset, Brazil's nuclear program has been shrouded in secrecy. Nuclear issues are still considered a matter of national security and sovereignty, despite Brazil's democratic makeup and transition away from military dictatorship. There is little transparency regarding the various nuclear activities under the government's purview and the potential impact these can have on public health and the environment. Moreover, numerous attempts to keep radioactive accidents and incidents secret have undermined credibility of nuclear enterprises and led to distrust among the public.

In particular, local stakeholders based near uranium mines and nuclear facilities have expressed various nuclear-related concerns, ranging from impacts of uranium mining to the feasibility of the emergency plans. Political authorities and civil society organizations also complain about the lack of mechanisms to facilitate dialogue with the nuclear sector. The 2004 episode in which Brazil denied IAEA inspectors full visual access to its centrifuges also adds to these accusations, as does Brazil's persistent refusal to adhere to the Additional Protocol (AP).

=== Costs of nuclear activities ===
While it is difficult to determine the total cost of the country's nuclear program across its history, the construction of Angra 1 and Angra 2 cost US$12.5 billion.

In 2008, the costs for the construction of Angra 3 were estimated in R$7.2 billion (US$3.4 billion). However, in 2010, that number was raised to R$10.4 billion (US$4.9 billion). This amount is in addition to the BR$1.5 billion (US$702 million) previously spent on the construction and the US$20 million spent annually with maintenance and storage of the equipment bought over 20 years ago.

In December 2012, the official estimate for the total cost of this project was R$13.9 billion (US$6 billion).

Several experts, like physicists and politicians Luiz Pinguelli Rosa and José Goldemberg, have voiced their opposition to Brazil's nuclear endeavor, calling it a very expensive source of energy. The anti-nuclear NGO Greenpeace considers the costs associated with nuclear energy to be an obstacle to Brazilian development of a domestic renewable energy market.

=== Contested legality of Angra 3 ===
In November 2007, Greenpeace filed legal motions to block the construction of Angra 3, arguing it was unlawful and unconstitutional. Greenpeace's lawyer, José Afonso da Silva, issued a legal opinion contending that the creation of Angra 3 was not a legal act of the executive branch. Da Silva's legal opinion also affirmed that Articles 21, 49 and 225 of the Constitution required that the construction of a nuclear power plant must be discussed beforehand in the parliament—an action that did not happen.

In January 2008, Federal Judge Renata Costa Moreira Musse Lopes ruled against Greenpeace's motion.

=== 2010 Joint Tehran Declaration (Brazil, Iran and Turkey) ===
The nuclear program of Iran has been the topic of heated international argument since 2003. As a major player in the global non-proliferation regime, the United States has been one of the main actors in this debate.

During the Lula administration (2003–2011), Brazil promoted an emphatic defense of the right of Iran, as an NPT signatory, to enrich uranium. While this action was in accordance with the argument usually put forward by Brazil – that affirms developing countries can acquire technology considered important for their national development – it represented a source of disagreement between Brazil and the United States. According to reports of then-Foreign Minister Celso Amorim and leaked U.S. diplomatic cables, the United States had been trying to impress on Brazil the need to convince Iran to come to an agreement with the IAEA regarding its nuclear program. Following the U.S. requests, Brazilian diplomats, together with their Turkish counterparts, brokered an agreement with Iran which became public in May 2010. The deal was formalized via the tripartite Tehran Declaration that allowed Iran to send 1,200 kilograms of 3.5%-enriched uranium to Turkey in exchange for 20%-enriched nuclear fuel for a scientific reactor.

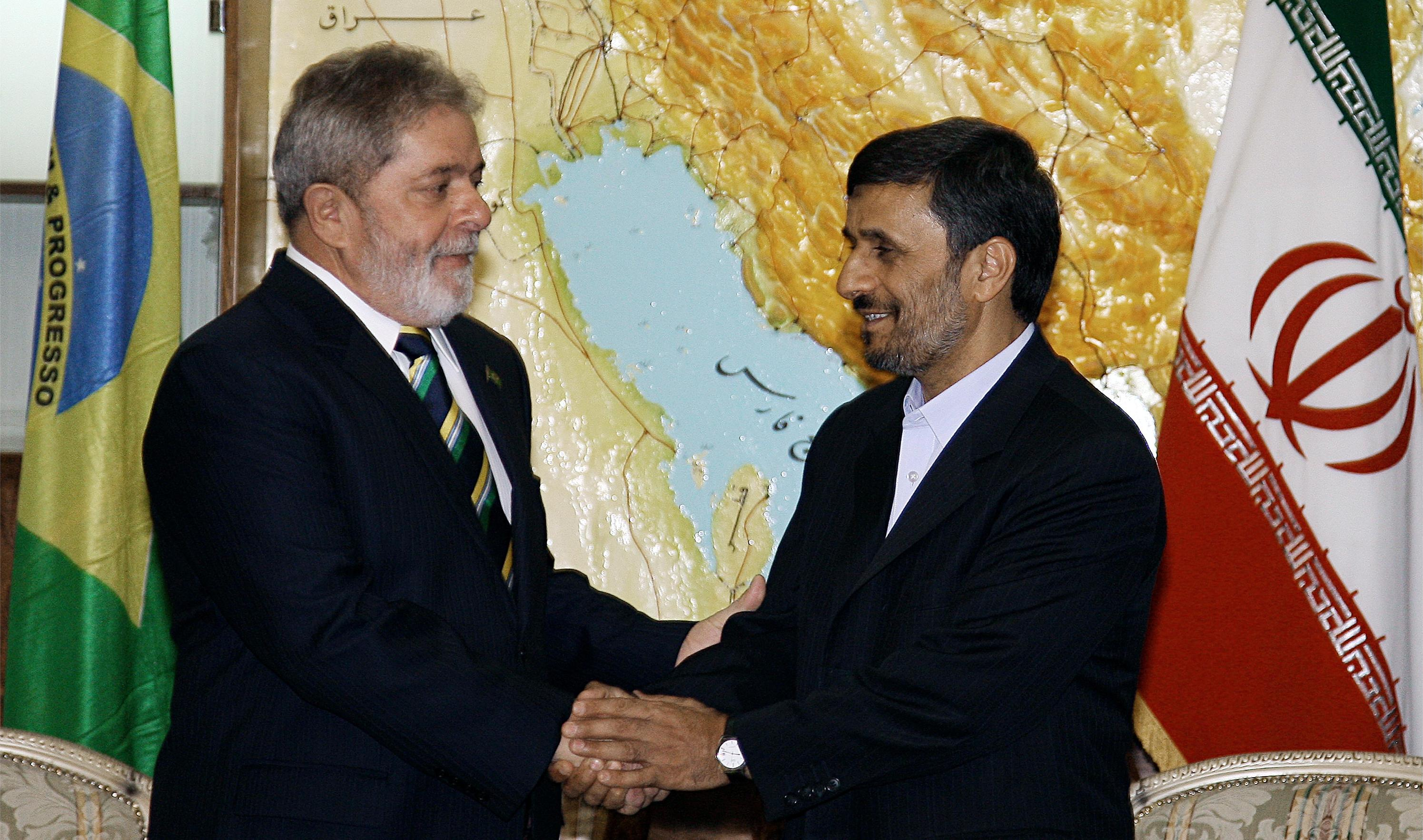
Lula and Ahmadinejad 2010

However, the initiative failed to win support of the five permanent members (P-5) of the United Nations Security Council. One reason cited was that the agreed-upon quantity of 1,200 kilograms was considered too low because it did not take into account Iran's accumulation of a larger amount of low-enriched uranium in the time since the IAEA first proposed the agreement, in late 2009. Additionally, the Tehran Declaration did not address Iran's production of 20%-enriched uranium. Thus, the United States and other Western powers worried that this agreement did not require Iran to curtail its enrichment program or even resolve outstanding questions about the possible military purposes of its nuclear activities. Shortly after the deal was announced, then-U.S. Secretary of State Hillary Clinton declared that the P-5 had agreed on a draft text for a new set of sanctions on Iran.

The rejection of this joint venture with Iran and Turkey was a big source of frustration for Brazilian diplomacy. However, despite being called naïve and accused of prolonging a controversial activity of a dubious regime, President Lula maintained that "engaging Iran – not isolating it – was the best way to push for peace and stability in the Middle East." In Lula's view, ‘‘the existence of weapons of mass destruction is what makes the world more dangerous, not agreements with Iran."

== See also ==
- Brazilian Navy Nuclear Program
