= Cláudio Camunguelo =

Brazilian flautist, dancer, composer, and singer

- Born: June 5, 1947
- Died: December 24, 2007 (aged 60)
- Genres: Samba, choro
- Instrument: Flute

Cláudio Camunguelo (June 5, 1947 – December 24, 2007) was a Brazilian flautist, dancer, composer and singer/improviser of samba and choro. His compositions were used by several of the more famous sambistas and choro artists including Zeca Pagodinho.
