= Orders, decorations, and medals of Brazil =

Rewards of Brazil

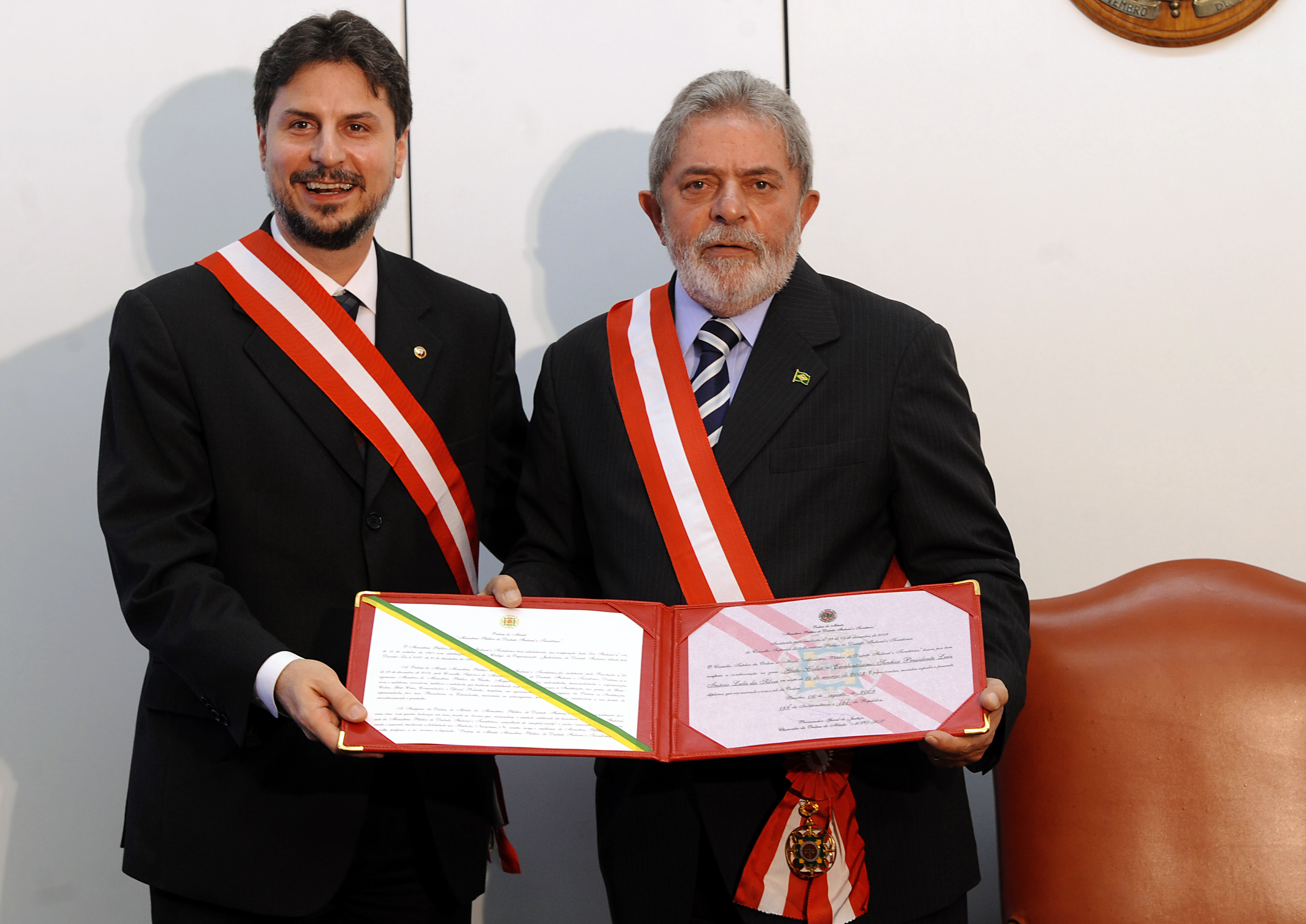
President Lula da Silva, with the Order of Merit.

The following is a list of the orders, decorations, and medals of Brazil:

== National orders and decorations ==
=== National Orders ===
- National Order of the Southern Cross (highest National Order, for foreigners only)
- National Order of Merit (highest National Order that admits Brazilian Nationals to its ranks)
- National Order of Scientific Merit

=== Distinction granted by special statute ===
- Inscription in the Book of Merit of the Heroes of the Fatherland (Steel Book)

=== Orders and decorations granted by the Executive Branch, ranking below the National Orders ===
==== Military Orders ====
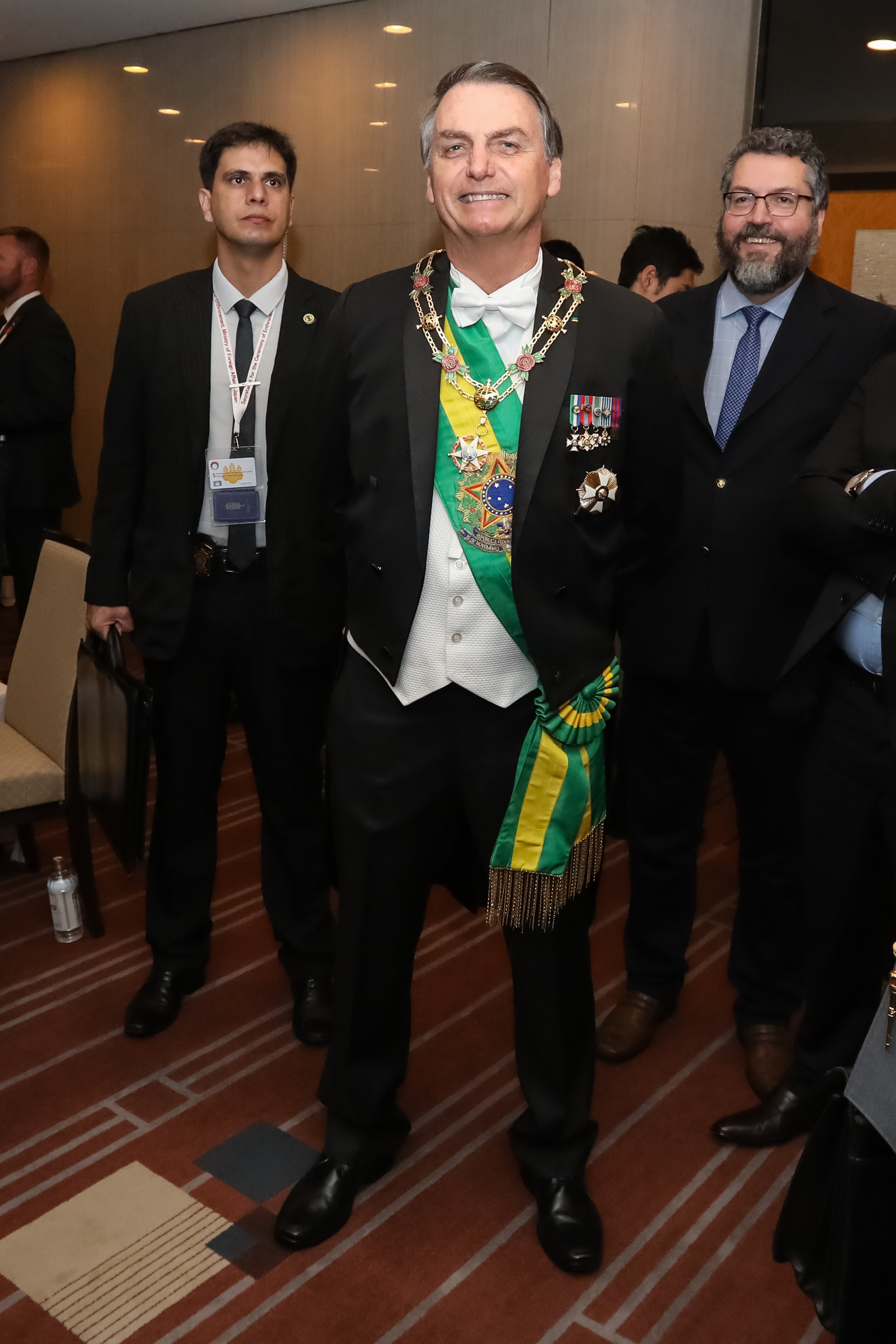
President Jair Bolsonaro wearing several Brazilian orders, decorations, and medals at the enthronement ceremony of Japanese Emperor Naruhito, 2019.

- Order of Defence Merit
- Order of Military Merit
- Order of Naval Merit
- Order of Aeronautical Merit
- Medal of Military Sports Merit
- Order of Intelligence Merit
- Order of Merit Military Public Ministry

==== Special Purpose Civilian Orders and Medals ====
- Order of Rio Branco (usually granted to personnel of the Brazilian Foreign Ministry, for achievements in diplomacy, or for foreigners)
- Order of Cultural Merit
- Order of Educational Merit
- Order of Sports Merit
- Order of Medical Merit
- Maua Merit Medal (for entrepreneurs of the transport sector),
- Order of Labor Merit (In 2007 renamed the Order of Labor Merit of Getúlio Vargas) (Portuguese: Ordem do Mérito do Trabalho Getúlio Vargas)

and others

=== Orders and Decorations granted by the Legislative Branch ===
- Order of the National Congress
- Chamber of Deputies Medal of Legislative Merit

=== Orders and Decorations granted by the Federal Judiciary or the Federal Public Ministry ===
- Order of Merit of the Labour Judiciary
- Order of Military Judicial Merit
- Order of Merit for Military Public Prosecution Service

== Former orders ==
- Imperial Order of Christ
- Order of Columbus
- Imperial Order of Aviz
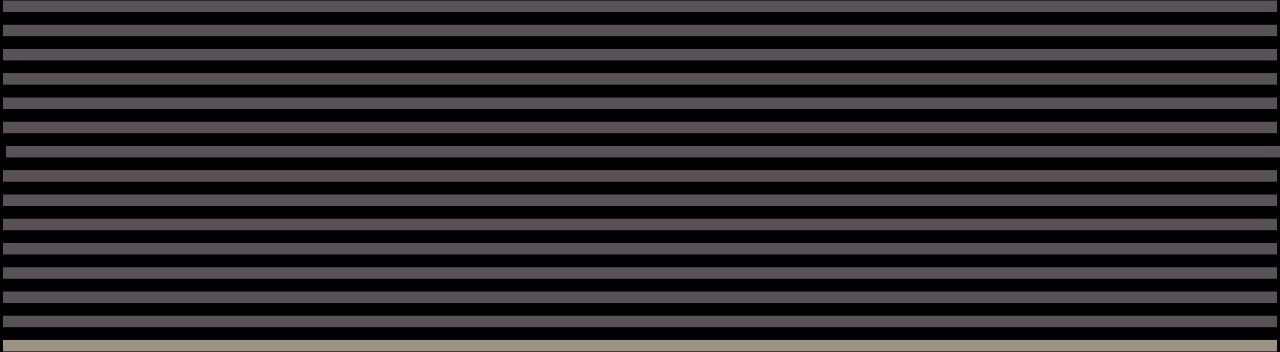
- Imperial Order of Saint James of the Sword
- Imperial Order of Pedro I
- Imperial Order of the Rose

== Military awards and decorations ==
=== Decorations for military bravery ===
- Combat Cross First Class (Army)
- Combat Cross Second Class (Army)
- Navy Cross (Navy)
- Bravery Cross (Air Force)

=== Wound medals ===
- Blood of Brazil Medal
- Blood Cross (Air Force)

=== Wartime medals for operational service ===
- Campaign Cross Medal 1914-1918
- Victory Medal (War of 1914-1918)
- Medal of Distinguished Service (Navy)
- War Services Medal with 3 stars (Navy)
- War Services Medal with 2 stars (Navy)
- War Services Medal with 1 star (Navy)
- Northeast Naval Force Medal - gold (Navy)
- Northeast Naval Force Medal - silver (Navy)
- Northeast Naval Force Medal - bronze (Navy)
- Southern Naval Force Medal - gold (Navy)
- Southern Naval Force Medal - silver (Navy)
- Southern Naval Force Medal - bronze (Navy)
- Campaign Medal (Army)
- Italy Campaign Medal (Air Force)
- Aviation Cross, ribbon A (Air Force)
- Aviation Cross, ribbon B (Air Force)

=== Outstanding service awards ===
- Distinguished Service Cross
- Medal of Victory
- Marshal Cordeiro de Farias Medal of Merit

=== Military good service awards ===
- Military Medal
- Troops Medal
- Good services Medal of the Military Police of the Federal District
- Medal of Merit for the officers and men of the Federal District Fire Brigade

=== Medals for contribution to national war efforts ===
- War Services Medal (Navy)
- Medal of the South Atlantic Campaign (Navy)
- War Medal

=== Military service medals ===
- Naval Medal of Distinguished Service (Note: Portuguese: Medalha Naval de Serviços Distintos) (Brazil)
- Peacemaker Medal (Note: Portuguese: Medalha do Pacificador) (Brazil)
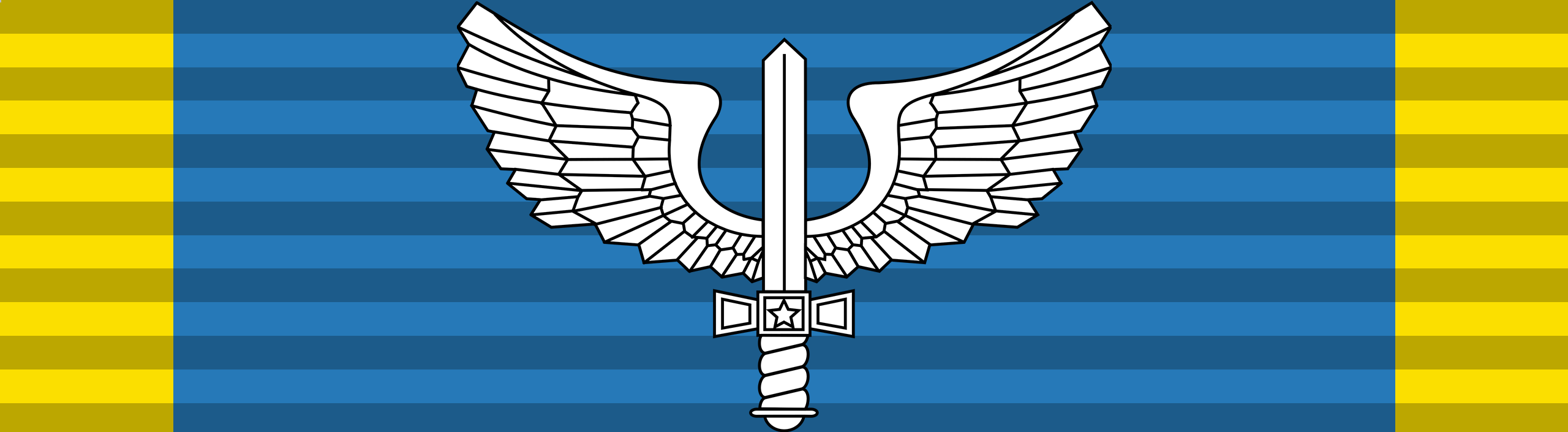
- Santos-Dumont Merit Medal (Brazil)
- Marshal Trompowsky Medal (Brazil)
- Tamandaré Medal of Merit (Note: Portuguese: Medalha do Mérito Tamandaré) (Brazil)
- Amazonic Service Medal (Brazil)
- Medal Bartolomeu de Gusmão (Note: Portuguese: Medalha Bartolomeu de Gusmão) (Brazil)
- Airborne Medal of Merit (Brazil)
- Joint Chiefs of Staff Medal of Merit (Note: Portuguese: Medalha Mérito do Estado-Maior Conjunto das Forças Armadas) (Brazil)
