= Marly de Oliveira =

Brazilian poet

Marly de Oliveira (March 11, 1935 – June 1, 2007) was a Brazilian poet who wrote eight volumes of poetry in a career lasting 40 years. Her best known work is "O Mar de Permeio" or "The Sea Between Us", a collection of poems about worry and despair, which won the Jabuti Prize in 1998. De Oliveira was a professor of Hispanic and Italian literature at the Catholic University of Petrópolis, the Faculty of Philosophy of Nova Friburgo and the Pontifical Catholic University of Rio de Janeiro. She was married to fellow Brazilian poet João Cabral de Melo Neto and she had two surviving daughters at the time of her death resulting from multiple organ failure. De Oliveira was a member of the Brazilian Academy of Letters.
