= Silas Rondeau =

Brazilian politician

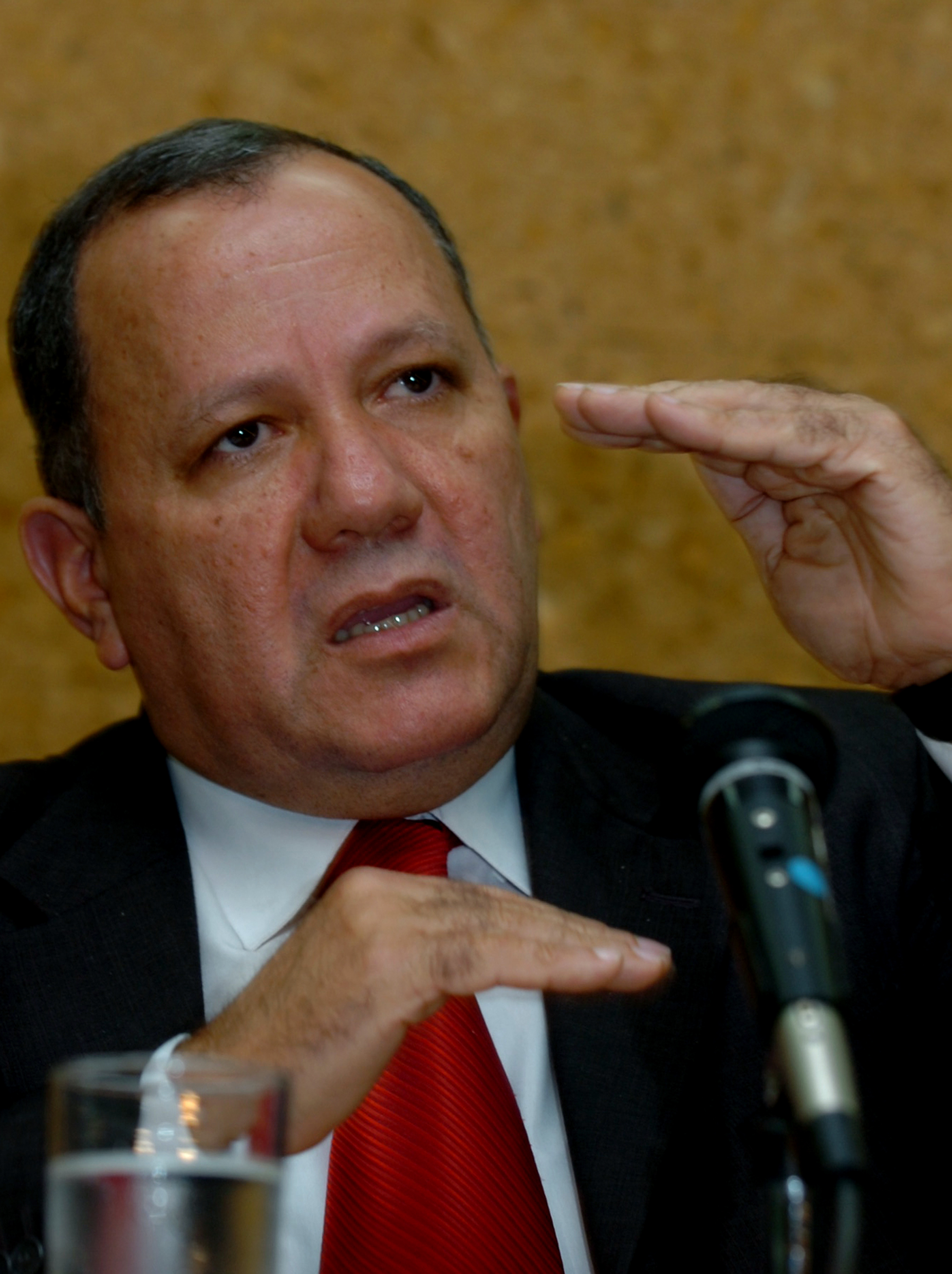
Silas Rondeau

Silas Rondeau is a Brazilian politician, and a member of Brazilian Democratic Movement Party (PMDB). He formerly served as Minister of Mines and Energy in Brazil President Lula's cabinet.

== Allegations and resignation ==
On May 22, 2007, he resigned over allegations of corruption in a public works project. According to BBC, the police suspected that Rondeau took more than a $100,000 reais kickback from a construction company that won a contract to provide power to rural areas across Brazil. But, the country's justice minister Tarso Genro said that there was no proof directly linking this scandal to Rondeau.

Rondeau claimed, in his letter of resignation, that he believed it was "the correct thing to do" and denied any involvement.
