= List of scandals in Brazil =

This is a list of scandals in Brazil.

== Before 1950 ==
- Bloody Beach Revolt (1770) An indigenous revolt in Roraima. So many soldiers and native people were killed, their blood tinted the waters of the Branco River.

== 1960s ==
Historians believe that construction of the planned capital city of Brasília was systematically overpriced when built in the early 1960s under Juscelino Kubitschek presidency.

== Military era (1964–1985) ==
Little to no evidence of corruption was made public during the military dictatorship era (1964–1985). Recently, however, several cases have become increasingly public knowledge and have been reviewed in books including the journalist Elio Gaspari's series of historical analyses and in the news. Cases ranged from smuggling whiskey and luxury clothes to outright extortion of companies by military-appointed governors (e.g., Haroldo Leon Peres in Paraná), who illegally favored their companies in contractor licensing (e.g. Antonio Carlos Magalhães and Magnesita) and used public money to save their own companies from bankruptcy (e.g., Paulo Maluf and his wife Sylvia Lutfalla Maluf in the Lutfalla case). British documents pointed out a number of other cases which were suppressed in the 1970s referring to overpriced purchase of UK equipment for construction of ships in Brazil.

== 1980s ==
- INAMPS scandal (1980s) – political and financial scandal that emerged in Brazil in the 1980s and involved allegations of corruption and embezzlement at the National Institute of Social Security for Civil Servants (INAMPS).
- El Maracanazo (1989) – a faked injury at a football match between Brazil and Chile which resulted in Chile being banned from the 1994 World Cup

== 1990s ==
- Impeachment of Fernando Collor (1992) - President Fernando Collor de Mello was first president of Latin America to face an actual impeachment process.
- Carandiru scandal (1992) - 111 prisoners dead at Carandiru prison, when military police invaded the penitentiary following a prison riot.
- Budget Dwarves (1993) - 100 million reais kickback scheme.
- Banestado scandal (1996) – a foreign exchange scandal involving a bank in New York
- Cayman dossier (1998) - forged documents intended to falsely "prove" that PSDB politicians running in the 1998 election were evading taxes.
- BNDES Wiretapping Scandal (late 1990s) – illegal wire tapping and corruption at the Brazilian National Development Bank, leading to arrests and criminal charges against several high-profile political figures and government officials
- Alstom bribery scandal (late 1990s) – large bribes to politicians and government officials in exchange for favorable treatment and contracts in multiple countries
- Banco Marka scandal (1999) – an insider-information bankruptcy scandal related to the devaluation of Brazilian currency announced by the government
- Paulo Maluf (1990s) – Notable examples of the allegations of corruption that surfaced around Paulo Maluf's tenure as mayor of São Paulo were the Avenida Água Espraiada (now Journalist Roberto Marinho Avenue), and the Ayrton Senna complex, which passes underneath Ibirapuera Park and cost more, per kilometer, than the Channel Tunnel (it is alleged that the tunnel cost over US$400 million more than it should)."
- Illegal diamond mining (1999-2004) – armed miners trespassing on the territory of the Cinta Larga indigenous group and conducting illegal mining operations

== 2000s ==
- Furnas List (2000–2002) – a corruption and money laundering scheme during the 2000s that involved the director of the state-owned electric utility in Rio de Janeiro giving illegal campaign funds to politicians, magistrates and businessmen in the 2002 election.
- Odebrecht Case (2001– ) international bribery case by a Brazilian construction company which was also embroiled in the Car Wash scandal. Forced the president of Peru to resign
- Celso Daniel affair (2002) – murder of PT member Celso Daniel and coverup involving buying the silence of witnesses
- Propinoduct scandal (2002) – a political corruption scandal in the 1990s in RJ state government of Anthony Garotinho, involving allegations of widespread bribery and corruption in the Brazilian government and public sector
- BANCOOP case (2002, 2004) - Allegations of money-laundering, invoice padding, Workers'Party slush fund.
- Operation Plague of Egypt (2003) - Also known as "scandal of locusts" and "grasshopper scandal"; embezzlement that caused the resignation of former governor Neudo Ribeiro Campos from the federal Chamber of Deputies.
- Escândalo dos bingos (2004)
- Brazilian Post Office scandal (2005) - bid-rigging at Correios.
- Mensalão scandal (2005) – parliamentary vote-buying scandal by Luiz Inácio Lula da Silva's administration
- IRB scandal (2005) – illegal monthly payments by the Brazilian Insurance and Reinsurance Institute (IRB) to Brazilian federal deputy in exchange for political favors
- Whistle scandal (2005) - Betting on rigged football matches.
- Operation Gabiru (2005) - Mayor of Rio Largo José Rafael Torres Barros and employees of nine other Alagoas municipalities skimmed 150 million reis from school lunch funds
- Ambulances scandal (2006) – financial scandal involving a gang embezzling public money intended for the purchase of ambulances. Known in Portuguese as the Escândalo dos sanguessugas (scandal of the bloodsucking leeches)
- Vampires scandal (2006) – overcharging for blood supplies
- Dossier scandal (2006) – corruption in the Ministry of Health during the Fernando Henrique Cardoso government, involving the PT electoral campaign arranging to buy a dossier that would implicate the PSDB candidate for governor of São Paulo, José Serra
- Renangate (2007) -Alagoas senator Renan Calheiros (PMDB-AL) implicated in taking money from lobbyists.
- Paulo Maluf (March 9, 2007) - Manhattan's District Attorney office issued an indictment against Maluf for money laundering in a kickback and inflated invoice scheme that allegedly stole $11.6m from a Brazilian road contract project totaling $140 million. From November 1997 to May 1999 the money passed through an account at Safra National Bank of New York secretly controlled by Maluf. A New York judge on April 25, 2012, dismissed a petition to toss the indictment. The same judge also refused to lift their March 2010 Red notice at Interpol.
- Airline ticket scandal (2009) – Every parliamentarian in the National Congress has an air travel budget to return to their constituencies. Some of them used the benefit to trips abroad or trips of friends and relatives.

== 2010s ==
- BTG Pactual (2012) - penalties for André Esteves' insider trading "force[d] the bank to amend its prospectus, give investors the option to reconsidering bids for BTG shares, and put a cloud over one of this year's highest-profile bank deals."
- CPMI do Cachoeira (2012) - Joint parliamentary inquiry into politicians and organized crime involved in illegal gambling. Allegedly shut down when Workers' Party money-laundering scheme was uncovered.
- Petrobras refinery purchase in Pasadena (2014) - $1.2 billion purchase of an oil refinery in Pasadena, Texas resulting in $580 million loss for Petrobras. Judge Vital do Rego found indications of "intentional mismanagement to cover up irregularities." UTC Engenharia and Odebrecht took over work on the Pasadena refinery, which cost between US$ 1 and 2 billion.
- Sabesp (2014) - allegations of failures in the São Paulo's water supply irregularities in the contract between Sabesp and the City of São Paulo.
- Mariana dam disaster (2015) – catastrophic failure of a dam at an iron ore mine on the Doce River in Minas Gerais that released 43.7 million cubic metres of mine tailings into the river, flooding two villages, killing 19 people, and causing a toxic mudflow which created a humanitarian crisis in cities along the river, and reached the Atlantic.
- Blackmail of Marcela Temer (2016) - Marcela Temer, First Lady of Brazil, blackmailed after her phone was cloned.
- Porto Maravilha - Trump Olympic Real estate deal in Rio de Janeiro
- Operation Veiculação (2016) - bid fraud involving contracts for vehicle leasing in several Paraiba municipalities
- Operation Sea of Mud (2016) - Embezzlement, bid fraud and corruption in Minas Gerais, including 1 billion reais from emergency relief funds intended for Governador Valadares.
- Port Inquiry (2018) - bribery scandal involving Michel Temer and contracts at the Port of Santos.
- 2018: Petrobras oil trader bribery:
- Operation Car Wash (2014 – 2022) a criminal investigation originally involving money-laundering at the state-owned oil company Petrobras and bribery of government officials, including politicians, senators, governors, and businessmen, which expanded to numerous other companies (notably Odebrecht) and a dozen foreign countries. Considered the largest corruption investigation in the country's history.
  - Phases of Operation Car Wash – (2014–2021) eighty individual operations which are part of the Car Wash investigation
  - Offshoots of Operation Car Wash (2015–2020) sixty additional operations spawned by the original investigation
  - Vaza Jato (2019) – private conversations relating to actions of officials investigating Operation Car Wash
  - Operation Patmos - bribery scandal involving Brazilian president Michel Temer, Eduardo Cunha, Joesley Batista of JBS, and federal Senator Aécio Neves
- Sete Brasil offshore drilling tenders from Petrobras. Bid-rigging and massive losses for investors, including several pension funds, offshore account for João Santana.
- 2016 Summer Olympics ticket scandal (2016) – attempted illegal resale of hundreds of tickets for the 2016 Summer Olympics
- Rio Olympics (2017) - Sérgio Cabral Filho and others in a bribery scandal centered on choosing Rio de Janeiro as an Olympic venue.
- Lochtegate (2016) – scandal involving U.S. Olympic swim team members who falsely reported a crime while at the Rio Olympics in 2016
- Panama Papers (2016) – published leaked documents that revealed thousands of companies participating in tax fraud and evasion
- Paradise Papers (2017) – leaked documents relating to offshore investments implicating people in dozens of countries
- Fernando Collor de Mello (August 2017) Collor was accused by Brazil's Supreme Federal Court of receiving around US$9 million in bribes between 2010 and 2014 from Petrobras subsidiary BR Distributor.
- JBS S.A. (2017) – "...during its rapid rise to become the world’s biggest meatpacker, JBS and its network of subsidiaries have been linked to allegations of high-level corruption, modern-day “slave labour” practices, illegal deforestation, animal welfare violations and major hygiene breaches."
- Operation Weak Meat - US FDA uncovers bribery of Brazilian meat inspectors
- Moro x Bolsonaro Case (2019) – statements made by former minister Sérgio Moro about President Jair Bolsonaro's alleged attempt to interfere in investigations related to his family members and the Federal Police
- Brumadinho dam disaster (2019) - 270 people died after a catastrophic failure. Public Prosecutor's Office complaint pointed to a collusion between owner Vale and certification company Tüv Süd led to the issuance of false declarations of dam stability. Sixteen employees and the two companies were formally charged by 270 homicides and environmental crimes.
- Amazon clandestine aerodromes (2019) - to provide transport to far communities, pilots prepare false flight plans, as most aerodromes that serve indigenous communities in the Amazon are unregistered because they do not meet safety standards.
- Medical equipment over billing
- Bolsonaro son money-laundering:

== 2020s ==
- Covaxgate (2021) – irregularities in the purchase of 20 million doses of the Indian vaccine Covaxin by the Brazilian Ministry of Health
- Police brutality in favelas (2022) -"According to a study conducted by Fluminense Federal University researchers, 182 people have been killed in at least 40 separate police operations in Rio de Janeiro alone between May 2021 and May 2022."
- Honeywell bribing Petrobras - United States Securities and Exchange Commission found that in 2010 Honeywell paid at least $4 million in bribes to a Petrobras official
- Lojas Americanas (2023) – "20 billion reais ($3.9 billion) in accounting “inconsistencies” at Americanas"
- Yanomami humanitarian crisis - the Federal public prosecutor's office denounced the government's failure to act against armed gangs of illegal miners during the presidency of Jair Bolsonaro as having precipitated the Yanomami humanitarian crisis which resulted in mass deaths, famine, and forced displacements.
- Bolsonaro jewelry scandal: Staff of Bolsonaro cabinet member accused of trying to smuggle jewelry worth US$ 3.2 million, a gift from the Saudi government, into Brazil without declaring it.
- Wolf of Wall Street
- Soccer match-fixing scandal:
- 2022 Brazilian attempted coup plot – members of the Bolsonaro government and of the Brazilian armed forces tried to block the transition of power to newly elected president Lula da Silva, and arrest members of the judiciary.
- Banco Master scandal

== See also ==
- Brazilian Anti-Corruption Act
- Corruption in Brazil
- Crime in Brazil
- Economy of Brazil
- Impeachment of Dilma Rousseff
- Impeachment proposals against Michel Temer
- List of political scandals in Argentina
- List of political scandals in Chile
- List of political scandals in France
- List of political scandals in Germany
- List of political scandals in the United Kingdom
- Mani pulite
- Politics of Brazil

== Works cited ==
- Abreu, Fellipe; Silva, Luiz Felipe (14 October 2015). "How Illegal Diamond Mining Threatens Brazil's Indigenous Communities". InSight Crime.
- Boadle, Anthony (1 February 2023). "Brazil readies task force to expel miners from Yanomami lands, officials say". Reuters.
- Bourne, Richard (22 April 2008). Lula of Brazil: The Story So Far. University of California Press. pp. 182–. ISBN 978-0-520-24663-8. OCLC 1010985650.
- Buarque, Daniel (2 June 2018). "Ditadura abafou apuração de corrupção dos anos 70, revelam documentos britânicos" [Dictatorship stifled investigation of 1970s corruption, British documents reveal]. Folha de S. Paulo (in Portuguese).
- Campos, Pedro Henrique Pereira (2014). Estranhas Catedrais. As Empreiteiras Brasileiras e a Ditadura Civil-Militar. 1964–1988 [Strange Cathedrals. Brazilian Contractors and the Civil-Military Dictatorship. 1964-1988] (in Portuguese). Niterói: Eduff. ISBN 978-8522809844.
- Delphino, Cristine. "Governo de Juscelino Kubitscheck" [Juscelino Kubitscheck's Government] (in Portuguese). Archived from the original on 23 September 2011.
- Dias Carneiro, Julia (6 May 2016). "Brazil dam burst: Six months on, the marks left by sea of sludge". BBC News.
- Dickerson, Marla; Johnson, Reed (2 April 2016). "Brazil Investigator Alleges Connection Between Murder and Corruption Scandal: Judge Sergio Moro alleges money siphoned from Petrobras may have been used to cover up death of Celso Daniel". WSJ.
- Emol (17 December 2013). "Astengo revela nuevos antecedentes del incidente en el Maracaná en 1989" [Astengo reveals new background on 1989 Maracaná incident]. emol.com (in Spanish). El Mercurio.
- Ferreira, Carlos. Uol Educação (ed.). "Collor foi o primeiro alvo de impeachment na América Latina" [Collor was the first impeachment target in Latin America] (in Portuguese).
- Brasilia branch office (20 October 1989). "Hospitais param atendimento a Inamps" [Hospitals halt service to [patients insured by] Inamps]. Folha de S. Paulo.
- Freire, Marcelo (April 2015). "Conheça dez histórias de corrupção durante a ditadura militar" [Learn ten corruption stories during the military dictatorship]. UOL Notícias (in Portuguese). UOL.
- Hemming, John (1990). Roraima: Brazil's Northernmost Frontier (PDF). London: Institute of Latin American Studies. ISBN 0-901145-68-8. OCLC 22732608.
- Kelly, Jared (6 July 2020). "The City Sprouted: The Rise of Brasília". Consilience (22). Columbia University Libraries: 73–85. ISSN 2156-1400. JSTOR 26924964.
- McCoy, Terrence (5 July 2021). "As coronavirus probe deepens, Bolsonaro increasingly threatened by a corruption scandal". Washington Post.
- Peixoto, Paulo (31 July 2012). "Ministério Público oferece denúncia sobre 'lista de Furnas'" [Public Prosecutor's Office offers complaint about 'Furnas list']. Folha de S. Paulo (in Portuguese).
- Redação Pragmatismo (5 July 2018). "Corrupção na ditadura militar era maior que hoje em dia, revela historiador" [Corruption during the military dictatorship was greater than today, reveals historian]. Pragmatismo Político (in Portuguese).
- Richter, André (24 January 2023). "Brazil Prosecutor's Office: Yanomami crisis caused by state omission". Agência Brasil. Brasília.
- Rodrigues, Léo (24 January 2023). "Brumadinho: Justiça aceita denúncia após federalização do caso" [Brumadinho: Justice accepts complaint after federalization of the case]. Agência Brasil (in Portuguese). Brasília.
