= Odebrecht–Car Wash leniency agreement =

Legal maneuver in Brazil's Operation Car Wash

Operation Car Wash Operação Lava Jato
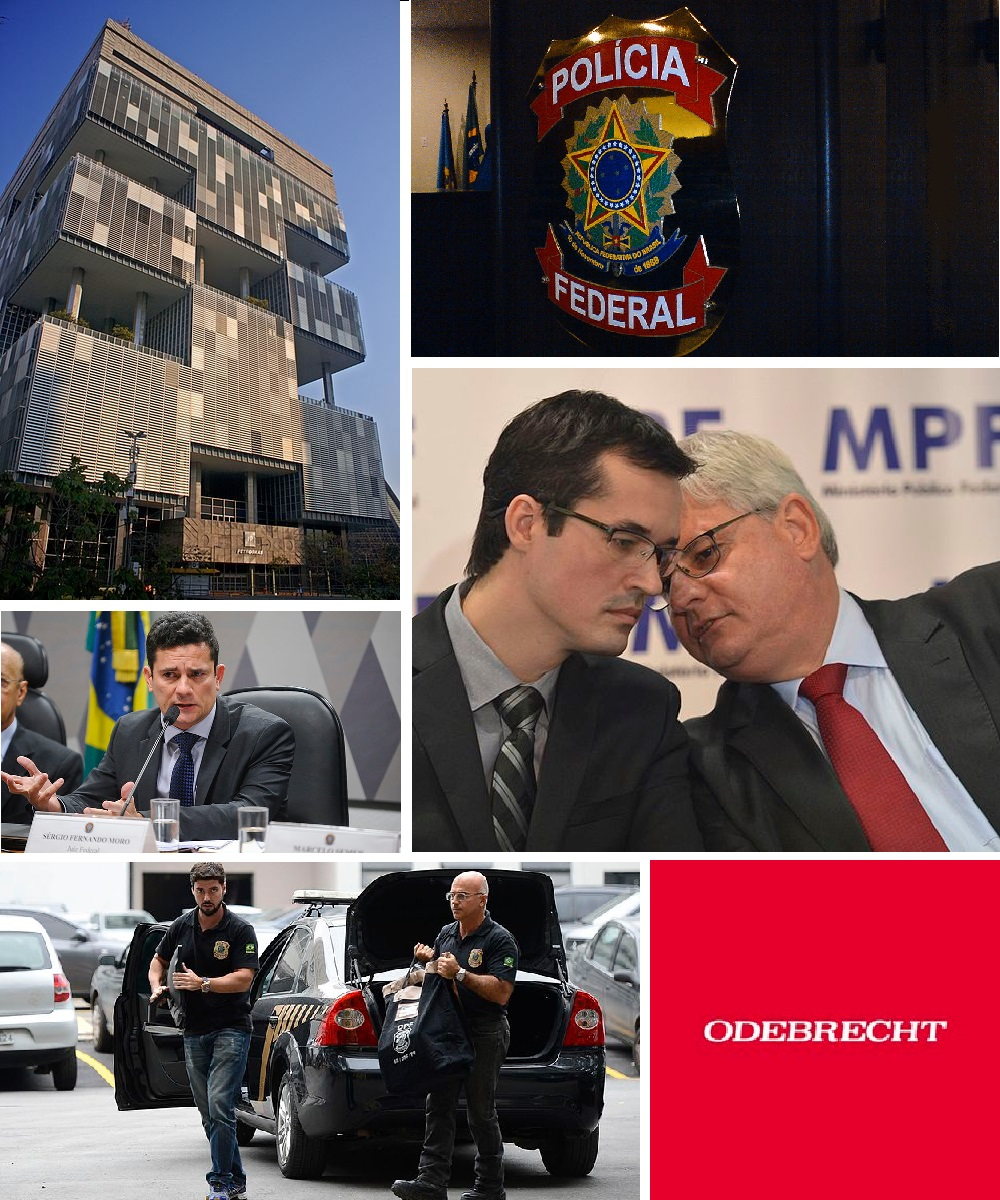
- Clockwise from top left: Headquarters of Petrobras in Rio de Janeiro; Emblem of the Federal Police of Brazil; Deltan Dallagnol with Rodrigo Janot; Odebrecht logo; Federal Police in an operation; Judge Sergio Moro
- Type: Anti-corruption
- Scope: Brazilian federal government

Roster
- Executed by: Lead prosecutor: Deltan Dallagnol (March 2014 – September 2020); Primary judge: Sergio Moro (March 2014 – November 2018); All judges: Judge: (Curitiba); Sergio Moro 17 March 2014 – 2 November 2018; Gabriela Hardt presiding as substitute 2019 to 6 March 2019; Luiz Antonio Bonat 6 March 2019 – 1 February 2021; Federal judge: (Rio de Janeiro); Marcelo Bretas (2015–2021); Federal judge: (Brasília); Vallisney de Souza Oliveira (2016–2021); Federal judge: (Porto Alegre); Leandro Paulsen (2015–2021); João Pedro Gebran Neto (2015–2021); Judge: (Superior Court of Justice); Felix Fischer (2015–2021); Judge: (Supreme Federal Court); Teori Zavascki (2014–2017); Edson Fachin (2017–2021)
- Countries participating: Brazil
- No. of countries participating: At least 11

Timeline
- Date begin: 2014
- Date end: 2021

Results
- Suspects: 429 individuals
- Indictments: 429
- Convictions: 159
- Miscellaneous results: Penalties paid by Petrobras: US$682.6 million to Brazilian government; US$85.3 million to US Department of Justice; US$85.3 million to United States Securities and Exchange Commission; R$6.2 billion (US$2.5 billion) identified as misappropriated from Petrobras; R$46.3 billion (c. US$9 billion) reimbursement requested by Petrobras; R$3.28 billion (US$912 million) recovered

The Odebrecht–Car Wash leniency agreement, also known in Brazil as the "end of the world plea deal" (delações do fim do mundo), (Note: Delações do fim do mundo literally, "end of the world denunciation". Delações is the plural of delação, meaning, "whistleblowing", "informing", or "denunciation". A denunciation could be either about individuals (delação premiada) or about a company, where it would be called a "leniency agreement".) was the leniency agreement signed between Odebrecht S.A. and the Public Prosecutor's Office (PGR) in December 2016, as part of Operation Car Wash. The agreement provided for the deposition of 78 of the contractor's executives, including the former president Marcelo Odebrecht, and his father, Emílio Odebrecht, which generated 83 investigations at the Supreme Federal Court (STF).

In March 2017, Attorney General Rodrigo Janot asked the Supreme Tribunal to withdraw the secrecy of the depositions. The following month, on 11 April, STF Minister Edson Fachin accepted the request of the A-G and withdrew the secrecy of investigations. On 12 April, federal judge Sergio Moro followed the same line as the Supreme Tribunal and withdrew the secrecy of denunciations involving people without foro privilegiado status (Note: Foro privilegiado – literally, "privileged forum", and officially known as Foro especial por prerrogativa de função, this is a special status defined in the Constitution and accorded to certain high officials (President, Deputies, Senators, and certain others) that allows them to skip lower courts in the case of a criminal case against them and proceed directly to the higher courts.) from the jurisdiction of judges of first instance. (Note: A judge of first instance (primeira instância) is a judge in a lower, or trial court, whose decision may be reviewed by an appellate court (court of the second instance).) Moro said in his order, "The judiciary should not be the guardian of shadowy secrets. Moreover, publicity prevents unlawful, regrettable leaks, which are difficult to control".

According to the lead prosecutor of Operation Car Wash, Deltan Dallagnol, the leniency agreement provided the "greatest refund in world history". Odebrecht and Braskem pleaded guilty and would pay fines of 3.5 billion dollars, the equivalent of 12 billion reals, 80 per cent of which would go to Brazil.

In 2018, the STF took from Lava Jato the so-called End of the World denunciation in which 415 politicians from 26 parties were mentioned, but merely one was convicted. It generated 270 investigations, but only five of them became criminal proceedings.

The signing of the plea bargain agreement resulted in several Operation Car Wash offshoots outside Brazil, especially in the Americas.

== See also ==
- Brazilian Anti-Corruption Act
- Chamber of Deputies
- Condução coercitiva
- Constitution of Brazil
- Corruption in Brazil
- Crime in Brazil
- Economy of Brazil
- Federal government of Brazil
- Federal Police of Brazil
- Impeachment of Dilma Rousseff
- Impeachment proposals against Michel Temer
- Industry in Brazil
- Judiciary of Brazil
- Law enforcement in Brazil
- Law of Brazil
- Odebrecht case
- Operation Car Wash
- Penal Code of Brazil
- Politics of Brazil
- President of Brazil
- Public Prosecutor's Office (Brazil)
- States of Brazil
- Timeline of Brazilian history
