= Impeachment proposals against Michel Temer =

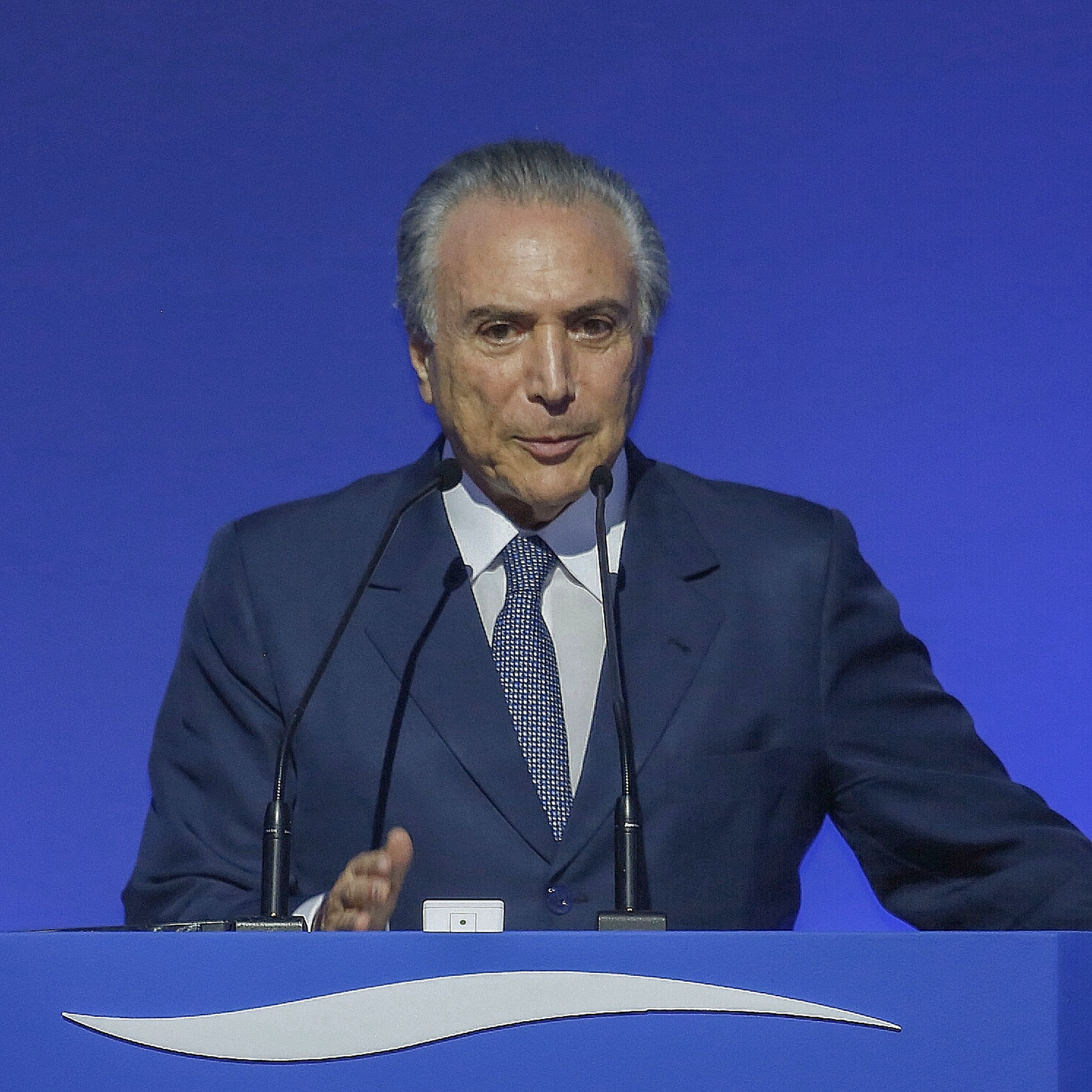
Michel Temer speaking at the Bandeirantes Palace on Dec. 9, 2013.

The impeachment proposal against Michel Temer, the former President of Brazil and former vice-president, consisted of an open procedural matter with a goal to preventing the continuation of the mandate of Michel Temer as vice president/acting president of the Republic of Brazil. Temer (as vice president) served as Acting President during the Impeachment process against Dilma Rousseff. The process began with the performance of judicial decision on April 6, 2016, the President of the Chamber of Deputies, Eduardo Cunha, to form commission for termination analysis of liability for crime offered by Mariel M. Marra. Four other requests for impeachment were presented to Cunha.

== 2016 ==
=== Basis for impeachment ===
Michel Temer, who succeeded Dilma Rousseff after her removal from office, also signed the same type of supplementary decrees that appear in the indictment of crimes of fiscal responsibility against Dilma. Temer, at various times when he was President-in-Office, released higher values than Rousseff released. This argument rests on the fact that if Rousseff was tried for signing such decrees, then Temer should also be tried for doing the same thing. However, there is disagreement as to whether any vice president may or may not be subject to an impeachment process.

Michel Temer's defense team wants to prove that the presidential and the vice-presidential committees had separate finances. His lawyers say that he didn't benefit from any funding coming from the Workers’ Party; since, Brazil's electoral prosecutors have found “substantial evidence indicating fraud and corruption” in the Rousseff-Temer presidential campaign. Journalists pointed that a former CEO of a construction company declared in a deposition that he donated a check of $300,000 to the Workers’ Party National Committee. According to the executive, that money was a kickback. But it turns out that the check in question was not destined to the Workers’ Party, nor to Rousseff's campaign committee. The check had Michel Temer and his party, the PMDB, as beneficiaries.

=== Request for impeachment ===
On 21 December 2015 Marra filed a complaint against vice-president Michel Temer, but Eduardo Cunha spiked it, archiving it on January 5, 2016. However, Justice Marco Aurélio Mello of the Supreme Court ruled on April 5, 2016 that the Chamber President should receive the request for impeachment of vice president and send the case back for analysis by a special committee in the House. The House of Representatives appealed to the determination that the decision be reviewed. On May 6, 2016, deputy leader of the government in the House, Silvio Costa, announced that the new chamber president, Deputy Waldir Maranhão, was committed to continuing the impeachment of Temer. On May 17, 2016, Justice Marco Aurélio allowed the impeachment request to enter the agenda of the Federal Supreme Court plenary session.

In July 2016, the elected president of the chamber, Rodrigo Maia, said that the special committee to consider the impeachment had not yet been created and noted that the Supreme Court had not set any deadline for installing the commission and later, in December, Maia asked Aurélio Mello to submit his decision on the opening of impeachment proceedings against President Temer.

== 2017 ==
President Temer was involved in another controversy in 2017, because of a disclosed recording of him discussing the payment of bribes with a jailed lawmaker. The Supreme Court opened a case, and Temer's lawyers argued that the tape was edited and thus inadmissible as evidence. The bar association requested an impeachment anyway, arguing that the tape would not be the sole evidence against Temer. Temer announced that he would not resign, and the PSDB prefers to wait for the Supreme Court ruling. On 9 June 2017, the Brazilian Superior Electoral Court voted 4–3 to acquit Temer of the indictment of fraud in the accounts of the With the Strength of the People coalition in the 2014 election.

== See also ==
- Brazilian Anti-Corruption Act
- Operation Car Wash
- Impeachment of Dilma Rousseff
- Panama Papers
- Mensalão
- Petrobras
- Supreme Federal Court
- Corruption in Brazil
- BNDES
- Odebrecht
- JBS S.A.
- Joesley Batista
- Eduardo Cunha
- Paradise Papers
- List of scandals in Brazil
