= Corruption in Brazil =

Corruption in Brazil exists on all levels of society from the top echelons of political power to the smallest municipalities. Operation Car Wash showed central government members using the prerogatives of their public office for rent-seeking activities, ranging from political support to siphoning funds from state-owned corporation for personal gain. The Mensalão scandal for example used taxpayer funds to pay monthly allowances to members of congress from other political parties in return for their support and votes in congress. Politicians also used the state-owned and state-run oil company Petrobras to raise hundreds of millions of reais for political campaigns and personal enrichment.

Corruption was cited among many issues that provoked the 2013 protests. Corruption directly affects the welfare of citizens by decreasing public investments in health, education, infrastructure, security, housing, among other rights essential to life, and hurts the Constitution by expanding social exclusion and economic inequality.

Studies by the Getúlio Vargas Foundation (FGV) from 2009 estimate that the Brazilian economy loses from corruption, every year, from one to four percent of the Gross Domestic Product (GDP), the equivalent of one value over 30 billion reais. The following year, a study by the Federação das Indústrias do Estado de São Paulo (Fiesp) found that the annual cost of corruption in the country is 1.38 percent to 2.3 percent of the GDP. In 2013, a study by the Industry National Confederation showed that each real misappropriated by corruption represents a damage to the economy and society of three reais.

According to the Corruption Perception Index by Transparency International, in 2025, Brazil was placed in 107 out of 182 countries.

The "Brazilian way" is seen as a practice of "small corruptions", such as evading taxes, stealing cable TV signals, jumping the queue, simulating or concealing business, among others.

== Definition ==
All types of corruption exist. Clientilism, cronyism, and nepotism are widespread in Brazil, and many critics note that members of the Brazilian Supreme Court openly mingle with politicians. Bribery (Portuguese: propina or suborno) is also rife throughout the Brazilian bureaucracy. But one of the most common types of corruption in Brazil is embezzlement of public funds through overbilling, called superfaturamento in Portuguese (literally "super invoicing"). This technique allows individuals to enrich themselves, and also finance political campaigns (as seen in the Petrobras scandal), and is closely linked to public contracts with private enterprises. Construction contracts to build roads, sewage, and public buildings are frequently involved. An estimated 30% of all Brazilian public funds are embezzled this way each year.

Fernando Filgueiras writes: tolerance to corruption is not a deviation of the Brazilian character, a propensity and cult of immorality, not even a situation of cordiality, but a practical disposition born of a culture in which preferences are limited to a context of needs, representing a survival strategy that occurs through the material issue. According to Raymundo Faoro, corruption is a "vice" inherited from the Iberian world, the result of a patrimonialist relationship between government and society.

== Measurement ==
The scale of corruption in Brazil is immense, but largely under-reported in the media and historically not investigated, prosecuted or punished, so it is difficult to estimate just how large the problem is. The Car Wash (Lava Jato) investigation may have changed this. Corruption in Brazil increases the already enormous Brazilian shadow economy, which some sources estimate at 16.1% of the gross domestic product, a number that probably needs to be adjusted up considerably if corruption as such is included as part of the shadow economy.

Transparency International's 2025 Corruption Perceptions Index gave Brazil a score of 35 on a scale from 0 ("highly corrupt") to 100 ("very clean"). When ranked by score, Brazil ranked 107th among the 182 countries in the Index, where the country ranked first is perceived to have the most honest public sector. For comparison with regional scores, the best score among the countries of the Americas (Note: Argentina, Bahamas, Barbados, Belize, Bolivia, Brazil, Canada, Chile, Colombia, Costa Rica, Cuba, Dominica, Dominican Republic, Ecuador, El Salvador, Grenada, Guatemala, Guyana, Haiti, Honduras, Jamaica, Mexico, Nicaragua, Panama, Paraguay, Peru, Saint Lucia, Saint Vincent and the Grenadines, Suriname, Trinidad and Tobago, United States of America, Uruguay, Venezuela) was 75, the average score was 42 and the worst score was 10. For comparison with worldwide scores, the best score was 89 (ranked 1), the average score was 42, and the worst score was 9 (ranked 181, in a two-way tie).

== Political corruption ==
Political corruption is widespread in Brazil. A series of sources documenting historical corruption have only recently started to be published, some of them with references up to Colonial times. A unique complex network analysis revealed associations between those involved in corruption scandals included not only active (elected and non-elected) politicians, but also both state-owned and private companies favored in bidding processes for large infrastructure construction projects. Some of these were cited both in the Panama Papers and Paradise Papers. The complexity of such corruption networks has been compared to mafia, drug traffic networks and terrorist networks.

The practice of superfaturamento—invoice-padding—in Brazil is a common form of corruption in contracts and purchases for public institutions. Recent examples have been reported in small primary schools where products like pencils and notebooks were bought with padded invoices, as well as in grand-scale construction projects, roads, football stadiums, (not least in connection with large-scale events such as the Olympics and FIFA's World Cup). Furthermore, bribes are also common in the police.

Generally, corruption occurs through resources from the public budgets of the union, states, and municipalities destined to health, education, social security and social and infrastructure programs, which are siphoned off to fund election campaigns, corrupt public officials, or even into personal bank accounts abroad. On October 13, 2020, Transparency International pointed to a "progressive deterioration of the institutional anti-corruption framework in the country" and serious setbacks in the fight against corruption in Brazil.

== History ==
=== Colonial and imperial times (1500-1889) ===
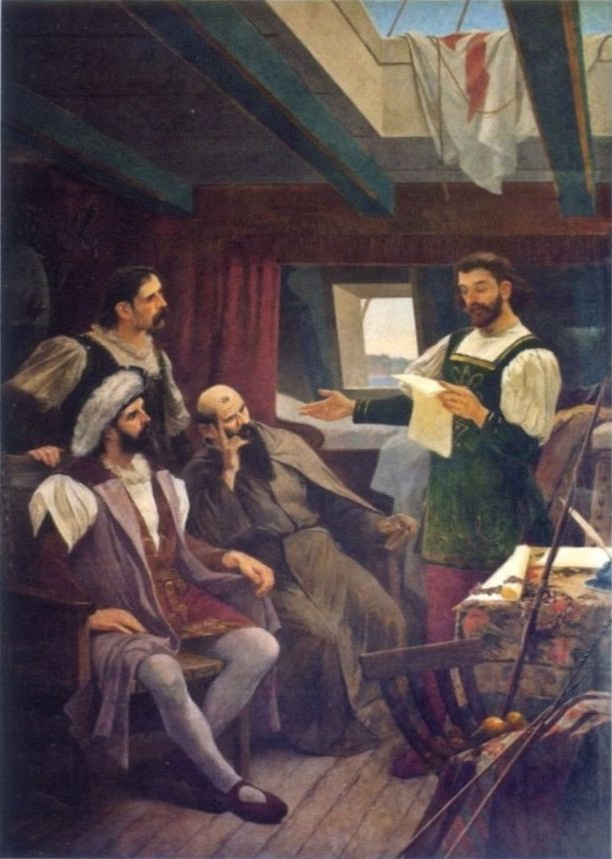
Pero Vaz de Caminha reads to commander Pedro Álvares Cabral the letter that would be sent to king Manuel I of Portugal.

Nepotism may have arrived in Brazil with the first caravel. A letter written by Pero Vaz de Caminha, asks the king to order "from the island of São Tomé to fetch Jorge de Osório, my son-in-law". To occupy and administer the new territory, a task quite complicated by the geographic distance and precariousness of communications, the Portuguese crown had to offer incentives and relaxed the vigilance of its representatives. This generated an environment so favorable to the practice of corruption, that already in the 17th century, Padre Antônio Vieira denounced it in the Sermon of the Good Thief:

(...) the thieves who most properly and dignifiedly deserve this title are those to whom the kings entrust the armies and legions, or the government of the provinces, or the administration of the cities... other thieves rob a man: they rob cities and kingdoms; others steal at their risk: these without fear or danger; the others, if they steal, are hanged: these steal and hang.

There have been reports of corruption in the highest spheres of power since the beginning of the 19th century. At that time, the following verses ran through the streets of the national capital: (Note: Sources diverge on the exact period of these verses, whether in the Joanine period – in the years of the permanence of the Portuguese royal family in Brazil, or in the imperial period.)

Whoever steals a little is a thief
Whoever steals a lot is a baron
Whoever steals and hides the most
Goes from baron to viscount

=== Fourth republic and military era (1946-1985) ===
==== Kubitschek government ====
In the era before the military dictatorship, a particularly notable example was the city of Brasília itself, which historians believe was systematically overpriced when built in the early 1960s, costing 12.3% of the entire country's GDP.

==== Military era ====
Little to no evidence of corruption was made public during the military dictatorship era (1964–1985). Recently, however, several cases have become increasingly public knowledge and have been reviewed in books including Elio Gaspari's series of historical analyses and in the news. Cases ranged from smuggling whiskey and luxury clothes to outright extortion of companies by military-appointed governors (e.g., Haroldo Leon Peres in the state of Paraná), who illegally favored their companies in contractor licensing (e.g. Antonio Carlos Magalhães and Magnesita) and used public money to save their own companies from bankruptcy (e.g., Paulo Maluf and his wife Sylvia in the Lutfalla case). British documents pointed out a number of other cases which were suppressed in the 1970s referring to overpriced purchase of UK equipment for construction of ships in Brazil.

=== Sixth republic (1985-present) ===
==== Sarney government ====
With the fall of the military dictatorship and the start of the redemocratization process, accusations of endemic corruption in all spheres of government were highlighted and started to receive attention, with then-President José Sarney himself being denounced, although those accusations were not taken forward by the National Congress. In the period between 1987 and 1989 a political crisis, allied to the economic crisis, broke out. Suspicions of overpricing and irregularities in public infrastructure projects were cited, such as the bidding for the North–South Rail. The accusations also said that José Sarney practiced nepotism, that is, he favored friends and acquaintances with concessions on radios and TVs. The dissatisfaction in a wing of the Party of the Brazilian Democratic Movement (PMDB), the current MDB, led to the founding of the Partido da Social Democracia Brasileira (PSDB). The height of the crisis came during the creation of the new constitution at the National Constituent Assembly, where party members put the duration of his mandate in check, voting for a four-year term for Sarney, despite the five-year thesis prevailing, led by a majority of the caucus PMDB and conservative politicians.

A Parliamentary Investigation Commission (CPI) was started in 1988 to investigate the corruption accusations, and several requests for impeachment were filed, The CPI named the former president as one of those responsible for the scheme, for having released money from funds controlled by the Presidency to municipalities, without criteria. As soon as the funds ran out, Sarney used the so-called contingency reserve with the help of the Minister of Planning, Aníbal Teixeira.

==== Collor government ====
In the last two decades of the 20th century, particularly after the end of the military regime, notorious cases of corruption gained great prominence in the media, having even resulted in the removal of Fernando Collor de Mello – first president of Latin America to suffer an actual impeachment process.

The first accusations appeared in the second semester of Collor's government. The then-president of Petrobras, Luís Octávio da Motta Veiga, quit, alleging pressure from the former financial secretary of Collor's campaign, Paulo César Farias ("PC Farias"), and the president's brother-in-law, ambassador Marcos Coimbra, to offer loans to the airline company VASP, which had been recently privatized. In 1991 the First Lady Rosane Collor was accused of irregularities at the charity Legião Brasileira de Assistência (LBA). In May 1992, Pedro Collor, the president's brother, accused PC Farias of illicit enrichment and being a "goon" for the president in his business in an interview to Veja.

From 1993, the extent of the accusations shook faith in the institutions and future of the country, and sparked the installation of a Parliament Investigation Committee (CPI), which became known as the CPI do Orçamento, presided over by then-senator Jarbas Passarinho and having as rapporteur the governor of Pernambuco at the time, Roberto Magalhães. In 2014, however, former President Collor was exculpated and acquitted by the Supremo Tribunal Federal of allegations of corruption that were brought against him and which had resulted in his impeachment.

==== Itamar Franco government ====
The new government assumed by Vice President Itamar Franco was initially supported by all political forces in Congress, except the Liberal Front Party (PFL), which also began to suffer allegations of involvement of ministers in corruption. Several of his ministers, including Henrique Hargreaves and Alexandre Costa.

==== FHC government ====
Fernando Henrique Cardoso's government, led by the Brazilian Social Democracy Party (PSDB), was also hit by a series of corruption accusations, firstly regarding federal "help" offered to banks such as Nacional and Econômico, and the creation of the Proer.

Many issues involved the privatization of state companies. One of the people cited in the accusations was a former director of Banco do Brasil, Ricardo Sérgio de Oliveira, who was in charge of financial resources for FHC's campaign, and was said to favor business with a consortium of Telecom Itália and Daniel Dantas' Opportunity Asset bank. Phone call recordings were central to several accusations regarding the PSDB. Conversations between the minister of Communications, Luiz Carlos Mendonça de Barros, and the then-president of the Brazilian Development Bank, BNDES, André Lara Resende, demonstrated efforts to benefit the Opportunity consortium.

Probably the worst accusations referred to the purchase of Congressional votes to introduce a constitutional amendment to allow for reelection to executive roles, namely the president. Telephone recordings made public by Folha de S.Paulo in 1997 revealed conversations between representative Ronivon Santiago (Progressistas Party – State of Acre) and a voice identified by the journal as Senhor X, to whom Ronivon Santiago reports that he received, along with four other representatives, 200 thousand reais to vote for the reelection amendment, paid by the then-governor of the state of Acre, Orleir Cameli.

By the end of 2000–2001, the attention on FHC's government had moved from corruption accusations to the energy crisis ("Crise do Apagão"), after a wave of blackouts started in 1999. The 1999 blackout was blamed on a lightning strike, although researchers at the National Institute for Space Research (INPE) demonstrated the official version did not hold. FHC tried to avoid a similar crisis in 2001 by imposing energy rationing.

==== Lula government ====
While Lula was in office, reports surfaced of payments made to deputies in return for a pledge to support the government with their votes in Congress. According to investigators, more than a dozen construction companies bribed or gave kickbacks to corrupt Petrobras. Former president of Grupo OAS José Adelmario Pinheiro and OAS executive Agenor Medeiros each were sentenced to 16 years incarceration on August 6, 2015. Three other OAS employees received shorter sentences.

The most notorious corruption scandal in the Lula government was the Mensalão scandal, a vote-buying scheme in 2005 involving the Workers' Party (PT), denounced by deputy Roberto Jefferson, who received a reduction of his sentence in exchange for his cooperation. The scandal later caused the Cassation of Roberto Jefferson. and José Dirceu, who was the Civil House minister in the Lula government and who was considered by the Supremo Tribunal Federal to be one of the commanders of the scheme. The PT bought votes from congressmen at the Congress, giving them an allowance, in exchange for support to pass reforms that the party wanted to pass. It was discovered, for example, that in 2003, the pension reform proposed by Lula passed Congress due to votes that were bought.

Before the monthly allowance, in 2004, the Lula government faced political crises in what was called Bingos scandal. In it Waldomiro Diniz, José Dirceu's advisor, appears in the dissemination of a tape recorded by the businessman and bookie Carlos Augusto Ramos, Carlinhos Cachoeira, extorting the "bicheiro" to raise funds for the electoral campaign of the PT and PSB in Rio de Janeiro. In exchange, Waldomiro promised to help Augusto Ramos in a public competition. The Ministério Público Federal filed the complaint filed by the Federal Court for criminal conduct in negotiations for the renewal of the contract between the Caixa Econômica Federal in 2003. It was initially demanded by a "consultancy" 15 million reais, which was closed at 6 million reais.

In 2006, the Dossier scandal also known as "Scandal of the Fools" came to light, as it became known, the repercussion of the arrest, on September 15, 2006, of some members of the Workers' Party (PT) accused of buying a fake dossier, by Luiz Antônio Trevisan Vedoin, with funds of unknown origin. The dossier would accuse PSDB candidate of the state government of São Paulo, José Serra, of having a relationship with the leeches scandal. The alleged plan would be to harm Serra in the dispute with the government of São Paulo, in which his main adversary in the dispute was the senator Aloizio Mercadante. Supposedly, not only was Serra a target, there were also accusations against the presidential candidate Geraldo Alckmin. The suspects' investigations and testimonies showed that the dossier's contents against PSDB politicians were false. The expression "aloprados" was used by Luiz Inácio Lula da Silva to designate those accused of buying the dossier.

In 2016, former president Lula (PT) became a defendant for passive corruption and money laundering, culminating in his conviction and imprisonment for 12 years and 1 month in April 2018. He was released from jail in November 2019, after 580 days in prison.

==== Dilma government ====
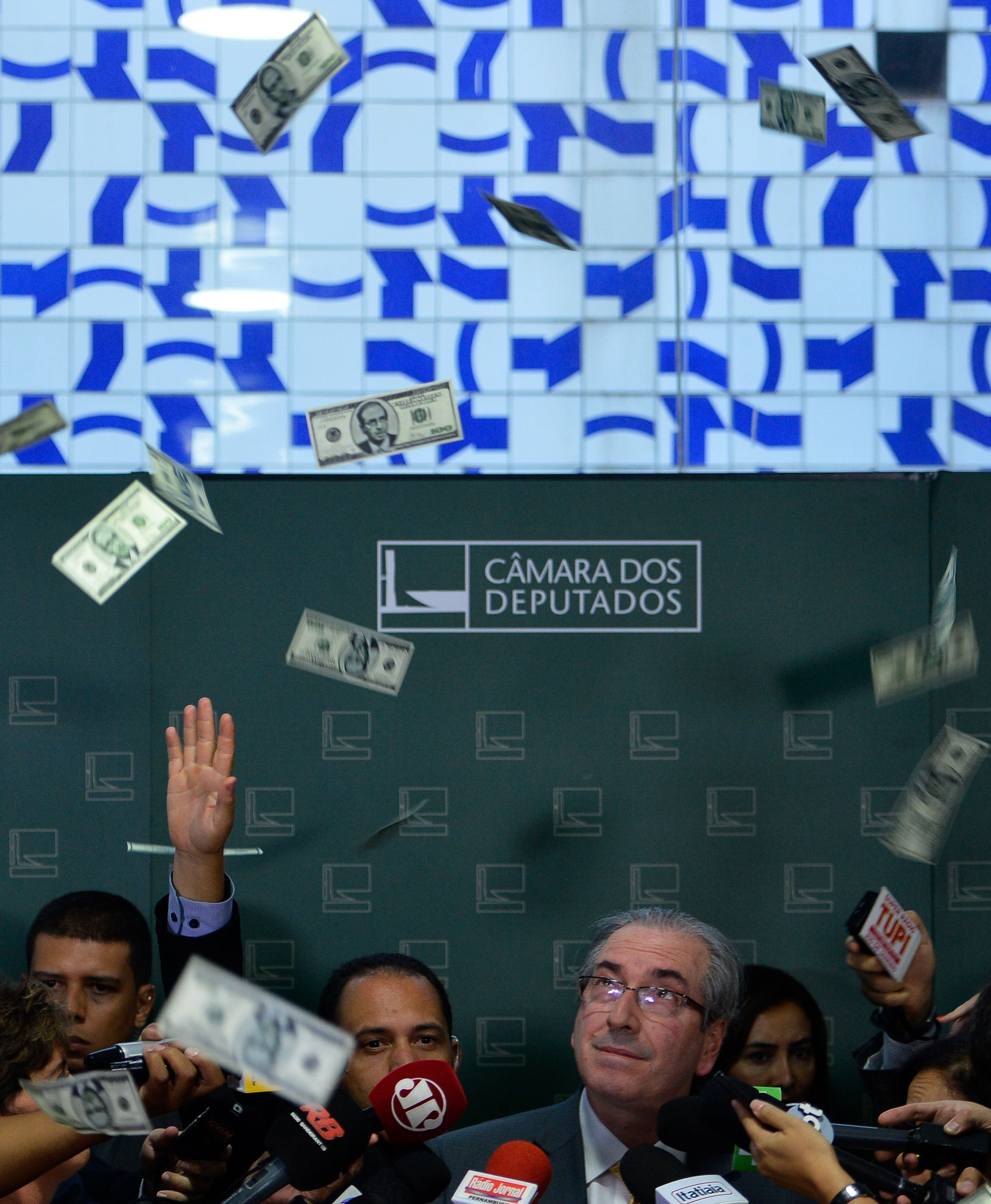
Eduardo Cunha, at the time president of the Chamber of Deputies, receiving a "shower" of fake dollars with his face in it in a form of protest against corruption

Operation Lava Jato, was an operation that was started in March 17, 2014, during the Dilma Rousseff government, by the Federal Police, Curitiba branch, ordered by Judge Sergio Moro. Initially a money laundering investigation, it later expanded to cover allegations of corruption at the state-owned oil company Petrobras, whose executives took kickbacks for awarding contracts to construction firms at inflated prices, and in other state-owned companies, The operation issued more than a hundred search warrants, and ordered temporary and preventive detention and coercive measures in its investigation of a money laundering scheme suspected of moving more than R$38.1 billion" (approximately US$11.3bn) as of November 22, 2016. Because of the unusual nature of its actions, defendants' lawyers accuse the operation of "selectivity" and "partiality", and of being "a criminal case that violated minimum rules of defense for a large number of defendants". to favor large contractors who practiced cartel, who in turn made payments bribes to politicians who defended the interests of these construction companies involved in the scheme. It was considered by the Federal Police the largest corruption scheme in the history of the country. The payment of bribes exceeds ten billion reals, and is considered by the US Department of Justice to be the largest case of international bribery. During the operation, more than a thousand court orders were authorized over 100 people were arrested and politicians such as André Vargas and Eduardo Cunha were impeached in the Chamber of Deputies, and later arrested. The operation was launched during the Dilma government, but the crimes began in 2004, during the Lula government, and lasted until 2015, during the Dilma government. The main parties involved are PP, PT and PMDB, however, it involves other politicians from different parties.

The Federal Police considers Operation Lava Jato the largest corruption investigation in the country's history, {and the United States Department of Justice considers the Odebrecht Group corruption scheme, investigated by Lava Jato, as the largest kickback payment in world history. Lava Jato revealed a table of systemic corruption in Brazil, showing that corruption has become part of the system itself. In 2015, an opinion poll carried out by the Datafolha Institute indicated that corruption is the biggest problem in Brazil. In June 2017, the Director for Combating Organized Crime (DICOR/PF) totaled that, as of 2013, losses from various diversions reached close to 123 billion reais.

In 2014, Throughout the investigation, members of the Dilma government and the former president herself were investigated for the purchase of the Refinery Pasadena Refinery System Inc, which resulted in a loss of US$790 million to Petrobras. In December 2014, the Controller General of the Union (CGU), through the minister Jorge Hage, appointed 22 responsible for the business, among them, José Sérgio Gabrielli and the former directors Nestor Cerveró, Paulo Roberto Costa, Renato Duque and Jorge Zelada, and exempted the president Dilma Rousseff, who chaired the board of directors of Petrobras, and Graça Foster, from any responsibility. In 2016, after the Supreme Court released the testimonies of Nestor Cerveró's State's evidence, it was found that, by the testimony of the whistleblower, the removed president, Dilma Rousseff, was aware of the payments of bribes to PT politicians, in the purchase of the refinery.

Dilma, who chaired the board of Petrobras from 2003 to 2010, denied knowledge of any wrongdoing The Brazilian Supreme Court authorized the investigation of 48 current and former legislators, including former president Luiz Inácio Lula da Silva, in March 2016.

The president of Petrobras, Aldemir Bendine, estimated in 2015 the company's losses from corruption scandals at R$6.2 billion. The company's shares fell, although they slowly began to recover.

In 2017, Dilma Rousseff had her assets blocked by the Federal Court of Accounts (TCU) for damages to Petrobras, and another five former members of the Board of Directors of the state-owned company were also affected. The decision is subject to appeal.

Operation Car Wash has resulted in the arrest of many important political figures, including:

- Treasurer of the Workers' Party, João Vaccari Neto, arrested for receiving "irregular donations."
- Former Lula chief of staff José Dirceu, arrested for orchestrating a large part of the bribery.
- Speaker of the Chamber of Deputies (lower house of the Congress of Brazil) Eduardo Cunha (PMDB-RJ), investigated for receiving more than US$40 million in kickbacks and bribes.
- Former minister of mines and energy Edison Lobão is being investigated for taking more than US$50 million from Petrobras.
- Former Brazilian President and current Senator Fernando Collor de Mello of the Christian-conservative Christian Labour Party, charged with corruption.

==== Temer government ====
The corruption scandals investigated by Operation Lava Jato continued to be investigated after the impeachment of Dilma Rousseff. In just a few days of existence, the Michel Temer government faced its first case of scandal and the first departure of a minister, after the newspaper Folha de S.Paulo released recordings of the minister of planning, Romero Jucá, in a telephone conversation in March 2016 with the former president of Transpetro, Sérgio Machado. In the conversation, when he was still a senator for the PMDB, Jucá suggested that a change in Dilma Rousseff's government could paralyze the operation, which was investigating both parties.

On May 17, the owners of the slaughterhouse JBS said, in denunciation, that they recorded the president Michel Temer authorizing the purchase of the silenced deputy and former president of the Chamber of Deputies, Eduardo Cunha, when he was already arrested by Lava Jato. The businessman Joesley Batista, owner of JBS, reportedly delivered a recording made in March 2017 in which Temer nominates the deputy Rodrigo Rocha Loures to resolve J&F matters, a holding which controls the JBS slaughterhouse. Later, Rocha Lourdes was filmed receiving a suitcase with five hundred thousand reais, sent by Joesley. In another recording, also from March, the businessman reportedly told Temer that he was paying an "allowance" to Cunha and the operator Lúcio Funaro, so that they would remain silent in prison. This scandal generated several popular protests and caused people to ask whether Temer could continue in the role of president.

==== Bolsonaro government ====
===== Pre-presidency =====
Another notable case is the fact that almost every member of Bolsonaro's family is being investigated by the police, except for Bolsonaro himself and his youngest children, Jair Renan Bolsonaro and Laura Bolsonaro. The corruption cases involving them are:

- Eduardo Bolsonaro: Eduardo Bolsonaro was investigated for having been a "phantom employee" during 2003 and 2004. He had been appointed to a commissioned position in the PTB leadership in Brasília, while attending courses in Rio de Janeiro, 1,333 km away. He earned the equivalent of 9,800 R$ (Approximately $1,700) per month.
- Flávio Bolsonaro and the Queiroz case: Flávio Bolsonaro was involved in a corruption scandal and political crisis called the "Queiroz case". The case began on June 12, 2018, when COAF released a report pointing out movements in the amount of R$1,236,838 ($223,522) in 2016 and 2017 in Fabricio Queiroz's bank account, at the time he held the function of driver and family safety. As the case unfolded, he exposed the arrest of Fabricio Queiroz, in which he had been found in the home of Frederick Wassef, a family member. The suspicion was that Flávio Bolsonaro made a scam where employees return part of their salary to him, in which, supposedly, Queiroz was the one who operated the system. In 2021, the STJ (Superior Court of Justice) annulled all the decisions of the lower court judge and the STF (Supreme Court) annulled the COAF reports, emptying the entire investigation.
- Michelle Bolsonaro: Bolsonaro's wife, Michelle Bolsonaro, was allegedly involved in the Queiroz case, in which in 2020, Crusoé magazine reported that it heard a breach of confidentiality in Fabricio Queiroz's bank account, authorized by the court, in which revealed that Queiroz and his wife had deposited around 21 checks (which together amount to 89 thousand reais, approximately 16 thousand US Dollars), in Michelle's account between 2011 and 2016.

===== Presidency =====
A notable case of corruption scandal in Bolsonaro's administration is that some ministers chosen at the beginning of the government were targets of investigation, namely: Luiz Henrique Mandetta, Tereza Cristina, Onyx Lorenzoni, Paulo Guedes and Marcos Pontes.

In the first year of his presidency, the Decree n. 9,690/2019 signed in January caused the discussion and concern of the bodies that monitor Brazilian corruption, the decree signed by the acting president, Hamilton Mourão and the Minister of the Civil House, Onyx Lorenzoni, would authorize commissioned servants to decree top secret confidentiality of public data; Until then, this power was restricted to the President of the Republic, his deputy, ministers of state, commanders of the Armed Forces and heads of diplomatic missions abroad; the following month, in a symbolic vote, the deputies overthrew the decree that went to the Senate for a new deliberation, and then archived. In the Chamber and in the Senate, bills were presented proposing the annulment of the decree due to unconstitutionality. the PDL 3/2019, approved by the Chamber, received an urgent request with 367 votes in favor and 57 against, and forwarded to the Senate, the House was already voting on two similar proposals, PDL 22/2019 and PDL 27/2019.

== Legal framework ==
To counteract widespread corruption in the private and public sector, Brazil enacted the Clean Company Act 2014 (Law No. 12, 846), which held companies responsible for the corrupt practices of their employees and liable without a finding of fault. Bid rigging and fraud are prohibited in public procurement, as well as bribery of Brazilian public officials. If found guilty of corruption the companies can be suspended, dissolved or fined.

An article by Global Compliance News stresses the difference between individuals and legal entities in Brazilian anti-corruption Law. Firstly, only individuals can be criminally punished if found guilty of bribery. Legal entities (i.e. companies and organizations) are punished with judicial and administrative sanctions. If found guilty legal entities are subject to losing 0.1% to 20% of their gross revenue along with the removal of all public loans, assets, and government subsidies. Foreign public officials found guilty of corruption are liable to penalties and up to eight years of imprisonment, while at the same time being subject to any punishments placed on legal entities. However, in spite of all this, Brazilian legislation does not put a limit on hospitality expenses to officials; although any amount can be considered corrupt.

== Corruption ranking ==
Based on data released by the Superior Electoral Court, the Movement to Combat Electoral Corruption released a balance on October 4, 2007, with the parties that include the largest number of parliamentarians quashed by electoral corruption since 2000. The Brazilian Social Democracy Party appeared in third place on the list with 58 cases, behind only the Democrats and the Brazilian Democratic Movement.

According to analysis released on September 8, 2012, of 317 Brazilian politicians who were barred from running in elections by the Clean Record Act the Brazilian Social Democracy Party has the largest number of barred candidates with 56 party members.

== Opposition ==
Anti-corruption sentiment in Brazil is a common subject in politics, media, art and activism. During the democratic period in the country, the press could report corruption cases and the opposition against the corruption was adopted by virtually all Brazilians. A study found that corruption was seen as the country's biggest problem.

=== In politics ===
During the Fourth Brazilian Republic, Adhemar de Barros was appointed by President Getúlio Vargas as governor of São Paulo. Ademar was accused of unjust enrichment and fired by Vargas, but was elected as governor of São Paulo by direct vote. The motto "He steals, but he gets things done" ("Rouba, mas faz") was first attributed to Ademar, suggesting that a politician that builds a good government can be elected despite his electoral crimes. Various politicians opposed Adhemar and the corruption in the country; Jânio Quadros beat Adhemar in gubernatorial elections and was elected president, by accusing Juscelino Kubitschek of taking advantage of the construction of Brasília, to make a government characterized by embezzlement. Other politicians, like Levy Fidelix, inspired by Jânio, also made anti-corruption speeches in their electoral campaign. The theme was platformed in various electoral debates.

=== Among the military ===
Positivism was a philosophy present in the military environment. Various prominent figures declared that the military coup in 1964, was to combat the corruption in the country. According to the military rulers, all civil politicians were selfish and corrupted; only the military could save the country. Even Jânio Quadros was a target of the regime's politics of persecution. After the return of democracy, political immunity was given to congressman to avoid unfair persecution, like those of the dictatorship. This controversial law is the subject of debate, because possibly corrupt politicians, when charged, can seek the protection by only being tried by the Supreme Court Jair Bolsonaro, a former military officer and president of republic, made controversial speeches against the establishment and parliamentarian forces.

=== By people ===
During the 2010s, several movements were created to combat political corruption, like the Free Brazil Movement. Movements like "Fora Collor" (Get-out, Collor), "Fora Dilma" (Get-out, Dilma), "Fora Temer" (Get-out, Temer) and "Fora Bolsonaro" (Get-out, Bolsonaro) were supported by popular masses. Military guerrillas stole money from Adhemar de Barros' safe box during military dictatorship.

=== By political system ===
The three branches of power in Brazil were associated with corruption or with the protection of corrupt politicians. During the impeachment process of Fernando Collor de Mello, supporters of parliamentary system said that parliament needed powers to more easily change the chief of government. Brazilian populists claimed that the legislative branch was made up of the corrupt. The supreme court was accused of being the greatest supporter of political corruption. Brazilian monarchists claimed that the spread of corruption, was a consequence of the republican system of government.

=== By ideology ===
Right-wing politicians accuse left-wing politicians of being corrupt. This stereotype was created during the government of Luiz Inácio Lula da Silva when the mensalão scandal was discovered. In the second term of Dilma Rousseff's presidency in 2016, citizens and right wing politicians began the movement to impeach Rousseff due to the failing economy. This was caused by how much money she took out of public banks for her federal campaign to become elected. Once Rousseff was impeached, Michel Temer took over and completed her term in 2018. During his term, Temer slowly introduced right-wing ideas to the public. After the end of Temer's term in 2018, Jair Bolsonaro was elected president and became the first right-wing president since 2001. He built up his political campaign through YouTube at first, slowly influencing citizens with far right ideas over time before running for office. Bolsonaro claimed in his political campaign that the Worker's Party was the most corrupt political party in the world. The idea that left-wing activists protect criminals like thieves, rapists and murderers, encouraged right-wing politicians to believe that the corrupt were also protected by leftists.

== See also ==
- Brazilian Anti-Corruption Act
- Caixa 2
- Crime in Brazil
- Economy of Brazil
- List of scandals in Brazil
- Politics of Brazil
