= Dani Cunha =

Brazilian politician (born 1987)

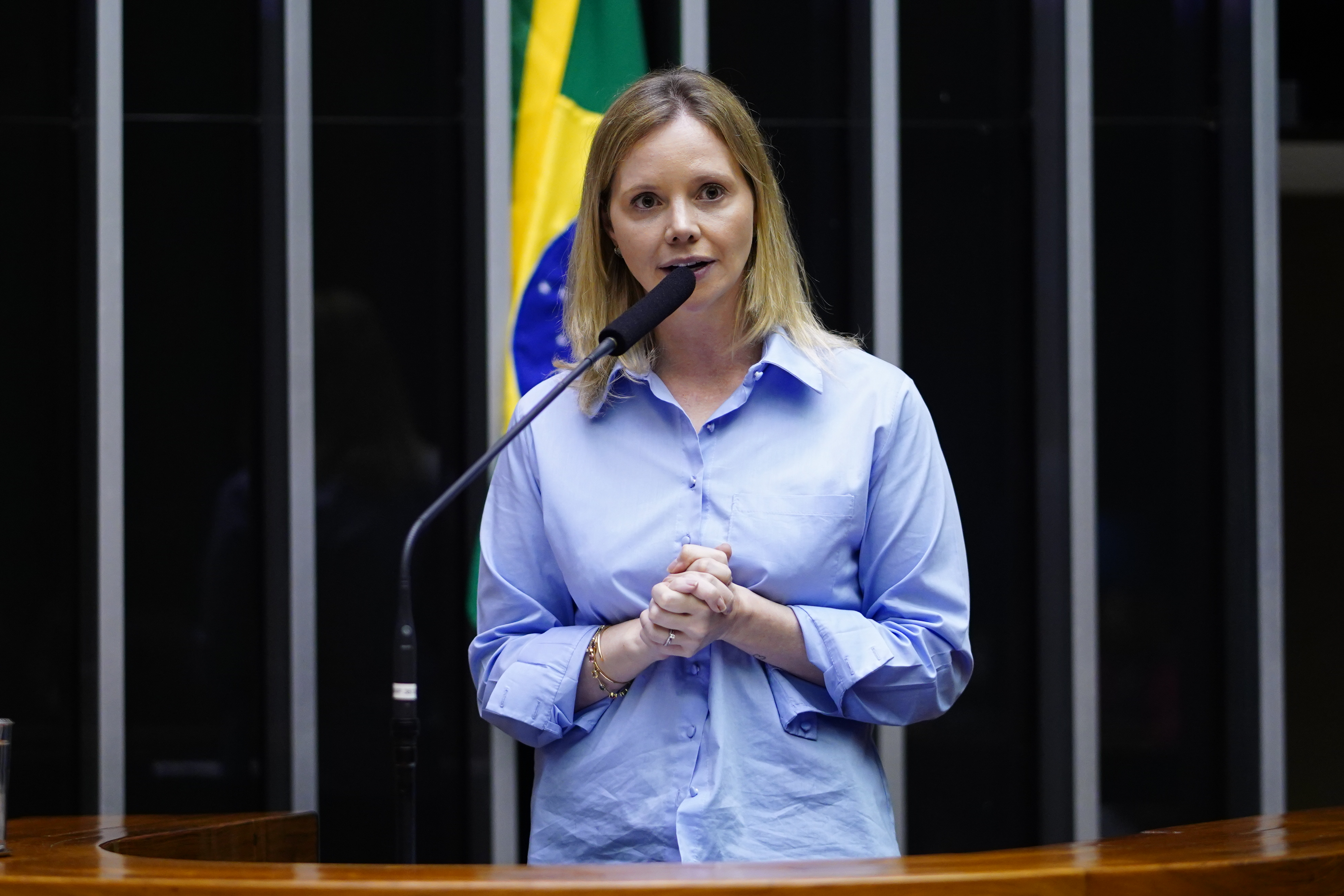
- Cunha in 2023

Member of the Chamber of Deputies
- Incumbent
- Assumed office 1 February 2023
- Constituency: Rio de Janeiro

Personal details
- Born: Danielle Dytz da Cunha; 19 May 1987 (age 39) Rio de Janeiro, Brazil
- Party: PL (since 2026)
- Other political affiliations: MDB (2017–2022); UNIÃO (2022–2026)
- Parent: Eduardo Cunha (father)

Danielle Dytz da Cunha (born 19 May 1987) is a Brazilian politician serving as a member of the Chamber of Deputies since 2023. She is the daughter of Eduardo Cunha.
