= Sergio Moro–Jair Bolsonaro case =

Police investigation

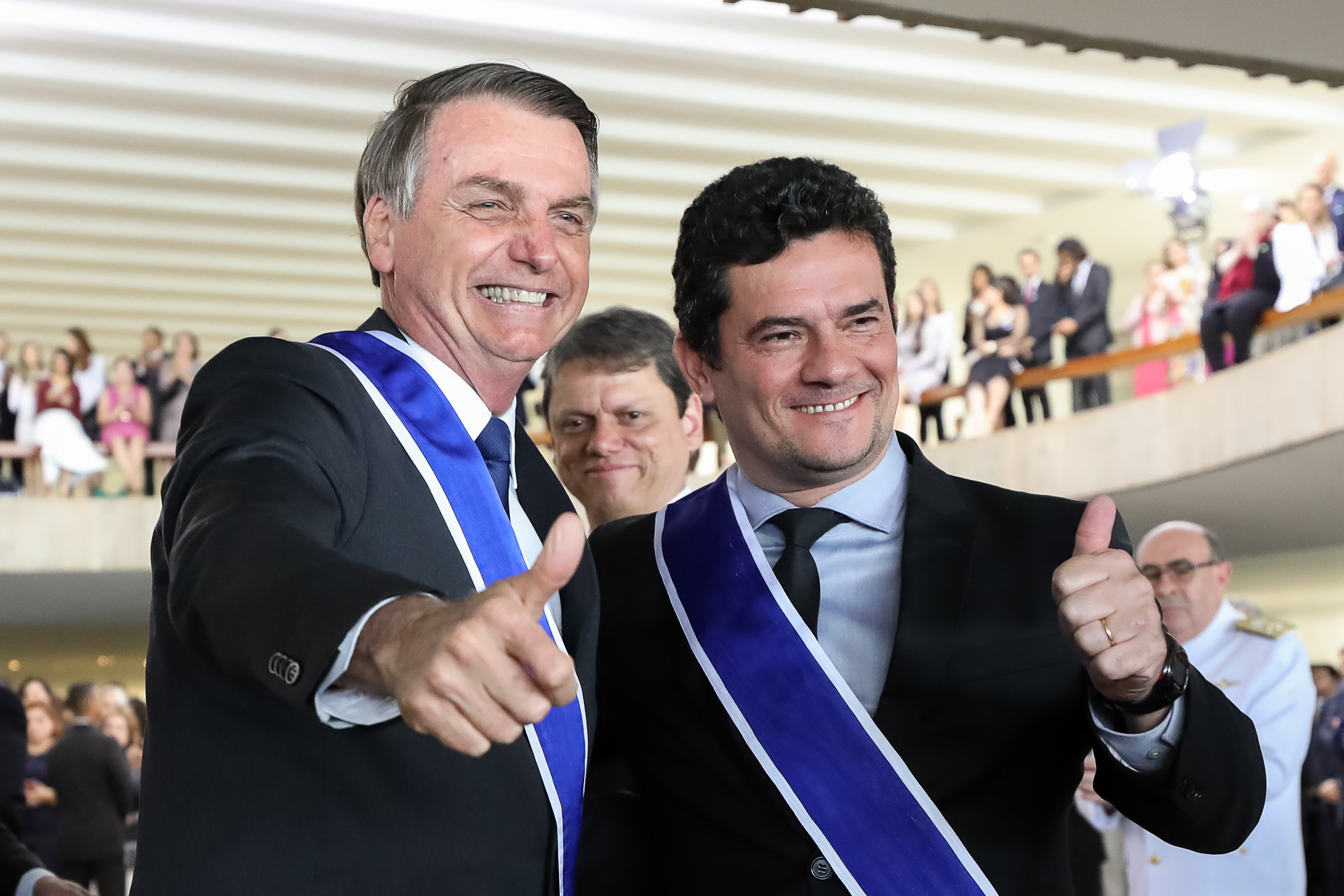
Moro and Bolsonaro during a ceremony, April 2019.

Moro x Bolsonaro Case, also known as Moro Case or Inquiry (INQ) 4831, refers to a police investigation in which statements made by former minister Sergio Moro about President Jair Bolsonaro's alleged attempt to interfere politically in Federal Police of Brazil and in investigations related to his family members.

The statements occurred after Sergio Moro announced his resignation. Hours before, President Jair Bolsonaro had published a decree in an extra edition of the Diário Oficial da União exonerating Federal Police Director General Mauricio Valeixo without Minister Sergio Moro knowing. The decree of Valeixo's departure was not formally signed by Moro, although his name appears in the decree. Immediately after his resignation, the Prosecutor General of the Republic asked the Supreme Federal Court to open an inquiry, causing a new political crisis to begin.

== Context ==
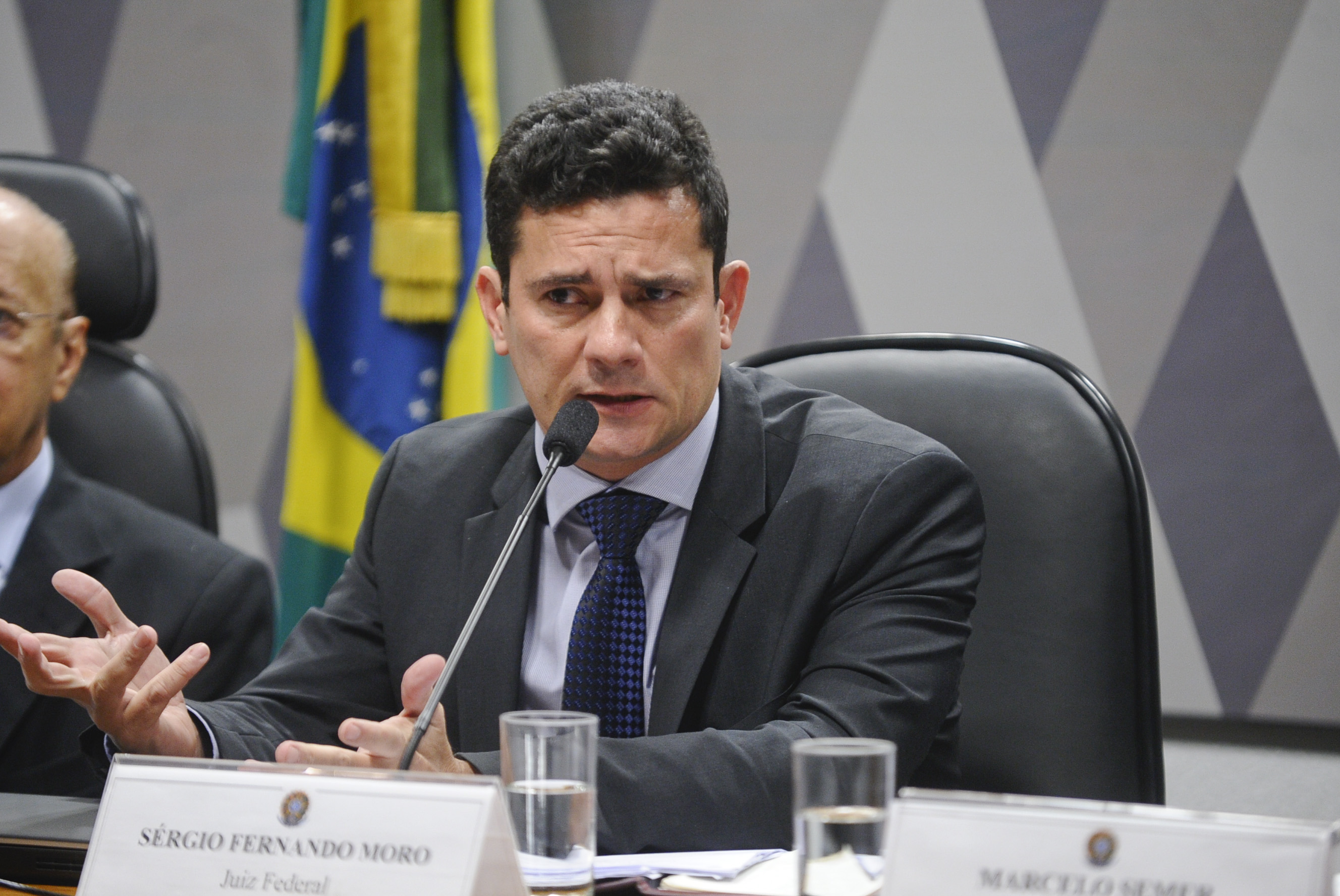
Sergio Moro resigned as Minister of Justice after the resignation of the Director General of the Federal Police, Maurício Valeixo.

In August 2019, Bolsonaro announced that the command of the Federal Police in Rio de Janeiro would be exchanged for "management and productivity" issues. An official note from the Federal Police, however, denied problems of performance of the command. The superintendent of the Federal Police in Rio de Janeiro was Federal Deputy Ricardo Saadi and the name chosen by the Federal Police director general, Maurício Valeixo, to replace Saadi would be that of Deputy Carlos Henrique Oliveira Sousa, superintendent in Pernambuco. However, after the PF publicly indicated the chosen one, Bolsonaro said that the nominee would actually be the superintendent in Amazonas, Alexandre Silva Saraiva, and amended his statement stating that "I am in charge". On the same day, however, Bolsonaro said "whatever" about the final decision. Historically, the choice of superintendents was made by the general director, without government interference. That's why delegates even considered a collective resignation, and the president of the National Association of Federal Police Delegates (ADPF), Edvandir Felix de Paiva, said that the president's influence should be limited to the choice of the director general. PF maintained Sousa's choice for the position in Rio de Janeiro.

=== Moro's resignation ===
On April 24, 2020, Sergio Moro announced his resignation from the ministry in an official statement after one year and four months in office. The decision would have been motivated by the resignation of the director general of the Federal Police, Maurício Valeixo, on the part of the president of the Republic, without the minister's knowledge. According to Moro, Bolsonaro would have told him that he wished to appoint someone to the Federal Police directorate to be his personal contact, from whom he could receive information about ongoing investigations at the Supreme Federal Court. Moro also stated that he had not signed the waiver decree, although his name was included in the publication, which is the digital signature of the document. He also stated that the president had not presented a justification for the change of command of the PF, failing to fulfill the commitment that he would have granted "carta branca" to make appointments.

Moro claimed that the president did not keep the promises established at the time of the invitation to take office in the government: "the problem is the violation of a promise made to me, of carta branca. In the second place, it would show political interference in the PF, which would shake not only my credibility, but also of the government".

== Inquiry ==
The Prosecutor General of the Republic, Augusto Aras, requested the Supreme Court to open an inquiry to investigate the complaints and, on April 27, Minister Celso de Mello, rapporteur of the case, authorized the opening of the inquiry arguing that "the crimes allegedly committed by the President of the Republic, as reported by the then Minister of Justice and Public Security, seem to be guarding (...) intimate connection with the exercise of the presidential mandate, in addition to maintaining - according to the period in which they would allegedly have been practiced - a contemporary relationship with the current performance of the political-legal functions inherent to the leadership of the Executive Branch".

On April 28, the president appointed Alexandre Ramagem - general director of the Brazilian Intelligence Agency (Abin) and friend of the Bolsonaro family - to the position of general director of the Federal Police. On the following day, however, the minister of the Supreme Federal Court, Alexandre de Moraes, suspended Ramagem's appointment citing Moro's allegations and justifying the existence of a misuse of purpose in the appointment, "in violation of the constitutional principles of impersonality, morality and public interest".

On May 2, Sergio Moro gave a statement for more than eight hours at the Federal Police Superintendence in Curitiba and stated that Bolsonaro asked him for WhatsApp, in early March 2020, the exchange of the head of the Federal Police in Rio de Janeiro with the following message: "Moro, you have 27 Superintendencies, I want only one, that of Rio de Janeiro". The former minister detailed the charges against the president and also presented as audio evidence, e-mails and messages exchanged with the president and other members of the government.

Moro also cited during his testimony the existence of the video of a ministerial meeting held on April 22 where the president charged the replacement of the superintendent of the Federal Police of Rio de Janeiro and Valeixo, in addition to police intelligence reports. This video would be included in the inquiry on May 4 after Prosecutor General Aras requested access to the video and requested statements from the ministers cited by Moro: Luiz Eduardo Ramos (Government Secretariat); Augusto Heleno (Institutional Security Office) and Braga Netto (Civil House), in addition to delegates.

On May 17, Paulo Marinho, a businessman and substitute for Senator Flávio Bolsonaro, stated in an interview with the newspaper Folha de S. Paulo that Flávio Bolsonaro had been warned in advance, between the first and second rounds of the 2018 elections, by a Federal Police delegate sympathetic to Jair Bolsonaro's campaign, about the outbreak of Operation Furna da Onça. It was this operation that would initiate the Queiroz case, in reference to Fabrício Queiroz who operated a "cracked" scheme. According to Marinho, the delegate would have informed that "Operation Furna da Onça will be launched, which will hit the Rio Legislative Assembly in full. And this operation will reach some people in Flavio's office. One of them is Queiroz and the other is Queiroz's daughter (Nathalia), who works in the office of Jair Bolsonaro (who was still a federal deputy) in Brasilia" and would have said that the operation, then secret, would be "insured" so that it would not occur during the second round, which would damage the candidacy of Bolsonaro.

The businessman was summoned by the Attorney General's Office to testify in the Moro case in order to ascertain the relationship between his accusations and Sergio Moro's charges. Marinho said he had presented new evidence to be used in the investigation and that he will hand over his cell phone for investigation.

== See also ==
- List of scandals in Brazil
