= Cláudia Cruz =

Brazilian journalist

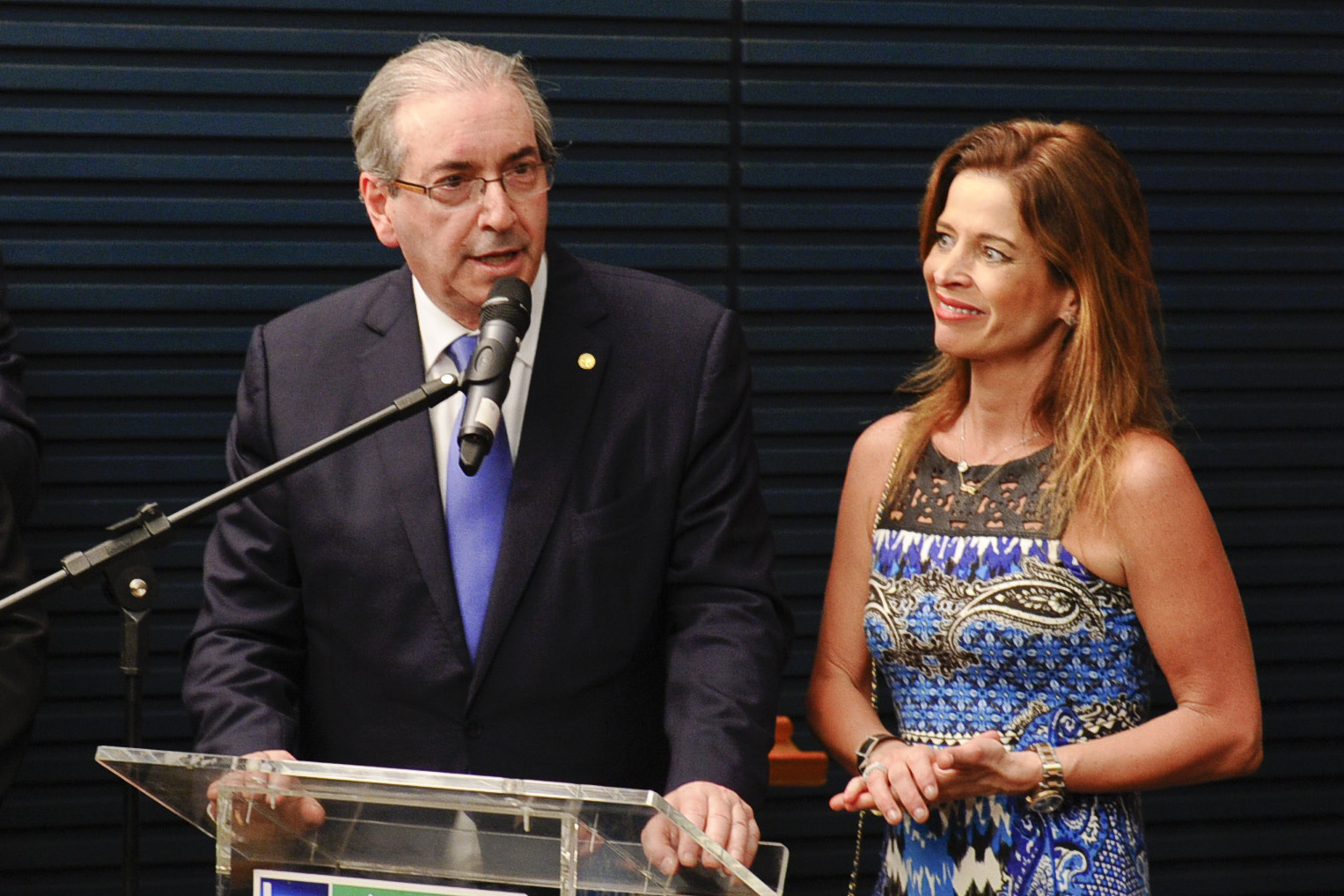
- Eduardo Cunha and Cláudia Cruz (right)
- Born: Cláudia Cordeiro Cruz; June 19, 1967 (age 59); Rio de Janeiro, Brazil
- Occupation: Journalist
- Spouse: Eduardo Cunha (m. 1996)

Cláudia Cordeiro Cruz (born 19 June 1967 in Rio de Janeiro) is a Brazilian journalist. She was an anchor on Fantástico, Jornal Hoje and RJTV. Claudia is married to politician Eduardo Cunha, former president of the Chamber of Deputies (away by order of the Supreme Court), with whom she has a daughter and three stepsons. Claudia has provided services to various companies and was an associate of Cunha in some companies, including Jesus.com and C3 productions.

On June 9, 2016, Claudia Cruz was a defendant in the process of Operation Carwash corruption case, along with her husband. Judge Sergio Moro accepted the allegations of the Federal Prosecutor who says she was aware of the crimes practiced and is the only parent of the account in the name of offshore Köpek, Switzerland, through which paid credit card spending abroad in an amount exceeding US$1 million within seven years between 2008 and 2014.

In 2024, she opened a shop in Rio, selling orchids.

== Career ==
Discharged from the TV Educativa of Rio de Janeiro, Cruz worked at TV Globo from the end of 1989-2001 presenting the news program Bom Dia Rio between 1989 and 1991, Jornal Hoje from 1991 to 1999 and fixed that same news program from 1992 and 1994 RJTV 1st edition between 1989 and 2001 and RJTV 2nd edition between 1999 and 2001. Claudia also presented the programs Globo Ciência, Globo Comunidade, Jornal da Globo and Fantástico.

After 2001, she left TV Globo and became anchor for TV Record's second edition of the Jornal da Record, a direct competitor of the Jornal da Globo, which was anchored by Ana Paula Padrão. Cruz was later replaced by Paulo Henrique Amorim. Claudia left the station after receiving an invitation to present the paper Tell River (now defunct). Currently dedicated to plastic arts.

Cruz, besides being a TV presenter, was the voice of TELERJ telephone company, where she met her current husband, and participated in a not credited bit in the film Meu Nome Não é Johnny in a scene that shows the RJTV.

== Personal life ==
Claudia is married to politician Eduardo Cunha. She has a daughter from a previous relationship with Carlos Amorim, and a daughter with Cunha. She is also stepmother of the three children from his previous marriage.

Cunha was removed from parliament in 2016. He was arrested and found guilty of corruption in 2017 and was sentenced to 15 years in prison.

== Filmography ==
=== Programs ===
- 1996 - 1997: Fantástico
- 1987 - 1989: Sem Censura

=== Newscasts ===
- 1989-1992: Bom Dia Rio
- 1993-1996 1997-2001: RJTV
- 1992-1993: Jornal Hoje
- 2001: Jornal da Record 2ª Edição
