= Odebrecht case =

Corruption investigation in Latin America

The Odebrecht case is one of the largest corruption cases documented in recent Latin American history, spanning more than 30 years. It is based on an investigation by the United States Department of Justice, along with 10 Latin American countries, into the Brazilian construction company Odebrecht. This investigation details how Odebrecht would have made bribes to presidents, former presidents and government officials of 12 countries: Angola, Argentina, Brazil, Colombia, Ecuador, United States, Guatemala, Mexico, Mozambique, Panama, Peru, Dominican Republic and Venezuela, during the last 20 years, in order to obtain benefits in public contracting.

== Overview ==
The Odebrecht case was one of the biggest transnational bribery schemes in Latin America. At least ten countries were involved: Argentina, Brazil, Colombia, Dominican Republic, Ecuador, Guatemala, Mexico, Panama, Peru, and Venezuela.

== By country ==
=== Argentina ===
According to US prosecutors, between 2007 and 2014 Odebrecht made multiple bribery payments worth $35 million to government officials in Argentina. On 4 January 2017, the head of the Argentine AFI (Federal Intelligence Agency), Gustavo Arribas, was indicted for receiving bribes and other gifts from Odebrecht. Between September 25 and 27, 2013, a Brazilian financial operator convicted by the Brazilian courts for the Lava Jato case transferred more than half a million dollars to an account of Gustavo Arribas, destined to pay bribes, money laundering and evasion. Arribas received almost $600,000 in his account in Switzerland. Former Minister of Public Planning, Julio De Vido and former secretaries José López and Roberto Baratta, were accused, charged and prosecuted for the crime of fraudulent administration and alleged bribery in the construction of the AYSA water treatment plant in Tigre and the water treatment plant in Berazategui. The director of AYSA, Carlos Ben, and the manager Raúl Biancuzzo were also prosecuted. The other defendants were the businessmen Tito Biagini, Aldo Benito Roggio, Jorge Corcho Rodríguez and Carlos Wagner. The case will be brought to oral proceedings in 2021. De Vido was also prosecuted for acts of corruption linked to the Odebrecht company, in the construction of gas pipelines in Argentina, together with the former Secretary of Energy Daniel Cameron.

=== Brazil ===
According to the judicial document released by the United States, starting in 2009, Odebrecht paid approximately US$349 million in bribes to various political parties in the country, foreign officials and their representatives in Brazil, financing political campaigns in elections to obtain benefits and contracts of construction works with local governments in different districts of the country, with the central government and several public companies administered by the State. Washington specifically mentions many contracts with the state oil company Petrobras, during different governments in recent years, and the Brazilian justice has already sentenced the millionaire and former president of the construction company, Marcelo Odebrecht (1968-), to 19 years and 4 months in prison for a scandal of corruption that involves the oil company with the construction company Odebrecht, with oil infrastructure works with this public company administered by the State. Eduardo Cunha, president of the Brazilian Chamber of Deputies, is currently in prison awaiting prosecution for corruption. In one of the charges brought by the Prosecutor's Office, Cunha is accused of receiving bribes from a consortium of which Odebrecht was part for works in the port area of Rio de Janeiro. Federal judge Sergio Moro, however, in Brazil's national court only found him guilty of paying more than US$30 million in bribes to Petrobras officials in exchange for obtaining contracts and influence for the company, but investigations continue to be able to determine the degree of responsibility of public officials during the governments of Luiz Inácio Lula da Silva, Dilma Rousseff and Michel Temer. Senator Aécio Neves, along with his party member, José Serra, and the President of the Republic, Michel Temer, was also summoned in court for accepting bribes.

=== Colombia ===
The document from the US judicial authorities maintains that in a period between approximately 2009 and 2014, Odebrecht made and caused payments of more than US$12 million to be made to secure public works contracts. The company made profits of more than $50 million as a result of these corrupt payments. The construction company has a presence in Colombia since 1991. Between 2009 and 2017, it made corrupt payments to secure public works contracts. In this period, two high engineering works appear, the Ruta del Sol sector, awarded in December 2009 by the transformed National Institute of Concessions (Inco), and the contract for the navigability of the Magdalena River, delivered in August 2014 to the consortium Navelena, which controls Odebrecht. Colombian justice has already focused its first actions on establishing what businesses Odebrecht S.A. had in the country. during the 15 years indicated in the United States. Prosecutor Néstor Humberto Martínez contacted the United States Department of Justice to arrange a way to share the information collected by the New York court, while in Colombia a specialized working group was created consisting of 3 prosecutors and 20 investigators. that they have already undertaken the first investigations into the Brazilian construction company Odebrecht, in which it is detailed that it had carried out money bribes and bribes to public officials of the government of several countries to obtain benefits in public contracting missions of information collection.

The Colombian justice aims to relate the legal representatives of public entities and the Brazilian multinational from 2009 to 2016, Odebrecht has operated since 1991 in Colombia, while it is intended to collect all the documentation that details the procedure that was given to them. to Odebrecht's businesses in Colombia. In principle, it seeks to establish if the findings and reports of the North American justice are sufficient to structure criminal proceedings for improper bribery, illicit enrichment and money laundering in Colombia, if the illicit ones are proven. Faced with the scandal unleashed by the announcements of the North American justice system, the Presidency announced that it has already contacted the North American justice system and there will be full collaboration in everything that is required. In his first statements, the Secretary of Transparency, Camilo Enciso, stated that his agency will help the courts to identify the official who received US$6.5 million in bribes between 2009 and 2010.

Odebrecht had a Structured Operations Division, managed by a paper company incorporated in the British Virgin Islands, through which it transferred money to carry out the bribes. The official was arrested for this case, and who received the US$6.5 million, is the former Vice Minister of Transportation Gabriel García Morales, to whom the Prosecutor's Office imputed the charges of illicit enrichment, bribery and undue interest in the conclusion of contracts, by favoring Odebrecht as the winner of the Ruta del Sol Section 2 contract, ruling out the other competitors. dente 2014: y18 The second arrest in this case was made in mid-January 2017 against former Colombian senator Otto Nicolás Bula; According to an investigation by the FIscalía, Bula was hired by the Odebrecht branch in Colombia on August 5, 2013, in order for the former senator to obtain the contract to build the Ocaña-Gamarra road, in favor of the Ruta del Sol SAS Concession, of which Odebrecht was part. In order for Odebrecht to obtain this contract, the firm's second bribe in the country for US$4.6 million would have materialized, so that the project would not be submitted to a tender as stipulated by law, but would instead be carried out properly. Directly through an agreement, which was achieved on March 14, 2014.

The Office of the Attorney General of the Nation charged former Senator Bula with the crimes of bribery for giving or offering and illicit enrichment.19 The construction company was expelled from the union by the Colombian Infrastructure Chamber on January 16, 2017.20 On January 14, former Liberal Party congressman Otto Bula was arrested, accused of receiving a commission of $4.6 million for favoring Odebrecht in the concession of a highway. Similarly, Bula has declared having delivered a sum close to US$1 million to a businessman named Andrés Giraldo, who would be the link between him and the Campaign Manager of Santos Presidente 2014 (reelection): Roberto Prieto. This would imply that the Government of the Nobel Peace Prize and the President himself would have some degree of involvement in this gigantic transnational scandal. The possible participation of the Brazilian consultant Duda Mendoça, detained within the framework of Operation Lava Jato, in Óscar Iván Zuluaga's campaign is also being investigated.

=== Dominican Republic ===
In June 2017, Supreme Court Justice Francisco Ortega sent eight individuals arrested in connection with the Odebrecht case including two senators and other officeholders to jail and two into house arrest, including several current or former officeholders. Defendants were charged with bribery, money laundering, and other crimes.

By mid-2019, the case appeared to be stalled, until the Public Prosecutor's Office filed charges and sent six to trial, which began in September 2020, but the case was weakened when none of the witnesses could testify to having witnessed bribery.

In June 2021, the former chief of the Public Prosecutor's Office from 2016 to 2020 was arrested on numerous charges related to the case, raising further doubts about the impartiality of the accusations in the case. Nevertheless, two of the defendants were convicted in October 2021, but there were questions about the validity of the ruling. The conviction was upheld in May 2023 by an Appeals Court, but a dissenting justice claimed the decision would likely be reversed on further appeal, In August 2024, the Supreme Court of Justice vacated the Appeals Court decision, declaring the defendants innocent.

With the high court decision, the Odebrecht case concluded in the Dominican Republic without any individuals being identified as responsible for the alleged bribes admitted by Odebrecht in 2016.

=== Mexico ===
In a period between approximately 2010 and 2014, that is, during the administrations of former presidents Felipe Calderón Hinojosa and Enrique Peña Nieto, Odebrecht was linked to payments worth US$10.5 million to win Mexican public works contracts that generated benefits. for more than US$39 million. Odebrecht participated in the reconfiguration of three refineries: Minatitlán (Veracruz), Tula (Hidalgo) and Salamanca (Guanajuato), for the state-owned Petróleos Mexicanos (PEMEX). In all of them there was direct award, overpriced payments or irregular budget increases.

In 2010, the government of Felipe Calderón announced a contract signed by Pemex Gas and Petroquímica Básica with Braskem and Grupo Idesa for the supply of ethane gas. This contract is related to the sale to the Ethylene XXI company of 66,000 barrels of ethane gas per day. To carry it out, the Brazilian firm committed to build the Ethylene Petrochemical Complex XXI in Coatzacoalcos, Veracruz, the largest complex of its kind in Latin America, and had the full support of the then governor of Veracruz, Fidel Herrera, and of his successor, Javier Duarte, with an initial investment of 2,000 million dollars; in the end, the cost of the work exceeded 5,000 million. However, an investigation by the weekly Proceso indicated that in reality there were a total of 11 contracts signed between 2009 and 2012 with the Brazilian transnational, of which generated heavy losses in the millions. In addition, the investigation by Mexicans Against Corruption and Impunity (MCCI) showed an email between two executives of the consortium, named Roberto Prisco Ramos and Alexandro Alencar, where they managed a meeting between Calderón and the then president of Brazil, Luiz Inácio Lula da Silva, as part of his business strategy at Pemex. The email was considered relevant evidence by Brazilian judge Sergio Moro, in a line of investigation against Lula for allegedly having lent himself to the interests of Odebrecht using his investiture as president of Brazil. The meeting between the Mexican and Brazilian president was held in February 2010, at that time the Brazilian investment became the largest injection of resources in the Mexican petrochemical sector and Pemex transferred three of its own infrastructure projects to Odebrecht, such as construction of the Ethylene XXI complex.

In 2013, already in the government of President Peña Nieto, Odebrecht agreed to pay a bribe to a senior official of a Mexican state-controlled company, in exchange for helping Odebrecht win a project, at the end of 2014. Odebrecht, Through the Structured Operations Division, he paid that official a few million dollars. The Brazilian conglomerate has a long history of doing business in Mexico, together with its subsidiary in the petrochemical field, Braskem, which is also accused of bribery of political parties in Brazil and officials and legislators in other parts of the world, the two companies have strong interests in Mexico, and it is easy to see their business history through the Mexican government's Transparency portal. In 2014, Odebrecht won the Pemex tender, through its subsidiary Tag Pipelines, section two of the colossal development of the Los Ramones gas pipeline, which runs through the states of Nuevo León, San Luis Potosí and Tamaulipas. The contract was for US$935 million, for which a bribe of more than US$10 million was paid. In 2017, the former director of Braskem, Carlos Fadigas, confessed his closeness to the PRI campaign in 2012, transferring bribes to a company linked to Emilio Lozoya Austin, the then director of International Linkage of candidate Enrique Peña Nieto and later director of Pemex of his government, with three transfers for 1.5 million dollars.5 In July 2019, a judge issued an arrest warrant against Emilio Lozoya for receiving bribes from Odebrecht, in addition to money laundering, illicit enrichment and criminal association.6 On February 12, 2020, he was arrested in Malaga, Spain. Odebrecht and its Braskem subsidiary used a hidden but fully operational business unit, a Bribery Department that systematically paid millions of dollars to corrupt officials in Mexico and other countries, said Assistant Attorney General Sung-Hee Suh, head of the Criminal Division, Odebrecht executives used the United States banking system to disguise the source and disbursement of money to pay bribes in Mexico, with money transfers through shell companies.

=== Panama ===
The US documents deposited in the Eastern District Court of New York also reveal that between 2010 and 2014, the private construction company Odebrecht would have promoted bribery payments for more than US$59 million in Panama, resulting in US$175 million of dollars of benefits in contracts for other public works, and the government of President Juan Carlos Varela gave its "total support" to the investigations on the subject that are already being carried out by the Panamanian Public Ministry. The Panamanian government announced that it is seeking the necessary actions to cancel a US$1 billion contract for the construction of a hydroelectric plant from Odebrecht, after the company pleaded guilty in a United States court to handing out bribes in several countries in the region and prohibit it from continuing to operate in the country as a qualified public works contractor. Panama awarded Odebrecht in 2014 for the construction and operation via administrative concession for 50 years of the Chan II hydroelectric plant, it will also prohibit Odebrecht from obtaining new contracts or endorsing all public works contracts that it has in the country, until it demonstrates a greater collaboration in the judicial investigations of the government, on the delivery of the bribes of more than US$59 million, to know the names of the public officials, politicians, governors, representatives or figureheads of previous governments, who received the bribes of the Brazilian construction company, in the largest corruption case in the history of Panama. In February, President Juan Carlos Varela was involved, after he was accused of having received "donations" from the Brazilian construction company Odebrecht. A citizen criminal complaint was filed to find out if people linked to the president, and the official deputy José Luis Varela, allegedly committed crimes of embezzlement and fraud. through a Swiss company, which had moved millions of dollars, whose shareholders are María Mercedes Rabat de Janón, Ramón Antonio Pino and Margarita Mejía.The secretary general of the opposition Democratic Revolutionary Party (PRD) Mitchell Doens asked the Public Ministry to criminally investigate former President Ricardo Martinelli (2009-2014) and two of his children for their alleged involvement in Odebrecht bribes. Odebrecht paid bribes in Panama for 59 million dollars between 2009 and 2014, when Martinelli governed, and that of that amount, 6 million were received by two close relatives

=== Peru ===
Prosecutor Hamilton Castro accused the Judiciary against the Governor of Callao, Félix Moreno, and the businessman Gil Shavit, who is currently detained in the Judiciary, for crimes of influence peddling and money laundering, for the alleged payment of bribes from the Brazilian company Odebrecht. The Prosecutor's Office issued 18 months of preventive detention for Felix Moreno while the investigations last. In the investigations of the Odebrecht Case, the highway project "Rutas de Lima" appears along with other works for which bribes paid between the mandate of the former Mayor of Lima Susana Villarán and the former Burgomaster of the city, Luis Castañeda, have been various investigations in the Lava Jato Case. In addition, an investigation by the Convoca.pe portal revealed that in the forms of the Structured Operations Department of the Brazilian company, “Concessão (concession) Rutas de Lima” was written next to an amount of 291 thousand 700 dollars that were paid in its two efforts . Later it was revealed that the company had financed the NO campaign to the Revocation of Susana Villarán, in 2013, because she was advised by Luis Frave. In May it is confirmed that they gave money to Jorge Acurio, the former governor of Cuzco. The Prosecutor's Office accuses him of having agreed to a bribe of 3 million dollars on the part of the Brazilian company Odebrecht in order to favor it with the tender for the work of the Vía de Evitamiento in the Imperial City. Together with the lawyer José Zaragoza, Rebaza, the secretary director of the Club Regatas de Lima and the Former Partner of "Alcázar & De Las Casas Abogados Financieros", a law firm that would have advised Odebrecht, who acted as an intermediary in the payment of 3 million dollars from the Brazilian company to the former governor of Cusco, Jorge Acurio Tito, in 2013 and together with Fernando Delgado, the former manager of "La Positiva Seguros" and the current president of the Club Regatas de Lima. According to the testimony of the effective collaborator-2017, the ex-governor of Cusco would have asked that the money received be deposited in the company "Wircel S.A" and that it would be Fernando Salazar Delgado who would be in charge of the movement. Lawyer José Zaragoza accepted the sincere confession and thanks to this the Judicial Power issued 18 months of preventive detention for the former governor of Cusco, Jorge Acurio and for the former president of the Prestigious Club Regatas, Fernando Salazar Delgado.

=== Venezuela ===
According to the United States Department of Justice, Venezuela is the country that received the most money in bribes from Odebrecht; Between 2006 and 2015 there are public works contracted by this construction company that did not advance and have remained paralyzed. According to a report from the Justice Department, the Venezuelan government received at least $98 million in bribes. Odebrecht built some stations of the Caracas metro, but most of the planned stations have been under construction for more than ten years and are not yet completed. The work of line five of the subway, which would run through the east of Caracas, was due to be delivered in 2010, but until 2016 the construction is only 30% complete. In November 2015 one of the stations on the line was inaugurated. Another work of the Brazilian company is the Bolivarian Cabletren. On August 14, 2013, three of the five stations corresponding to the first phase began operations, but one of them is still under construction, the government of Hugo Chávez Frías contracted the works in 2007 and promised to have the works ready in 2015, by 2016 have not been completed. Another work not completed by the Odebrecht Group in Venezuela is the expansion of Line II of the Los Teques metro, in Miranda state, which would have seven stations. Only three of them are operational for 2016. The Attorney General of the Republic, Luisa Ortega Díaz, traveled to Brazil to follow up on the Odebrecht corruption case, where she met with the Attorney General, Rodrigo Janot. Meanwhile, President Nicolás Maduro emphasized that his government will finish the halted constructions using Venezuelan companies. The Venezuelan authorities also generated international controversy by detaining and expelling from the country Brazilian journalists, Leandro Stoliar and Gilzon Sousa, who traveled to the city of Maracaibo (capital of the state of Zulia) to verify, among other things, the abandonment of the works of the Cacique Nigale Bridge - also called the second bridge over the Lake.68 According to information managed by the Brazilian newspaper Valor Economico, the Odebrecht group illegally contributed money to the campaign of the Venezuelan opposition leader Henrique Capriles in 2012. In October 2017, Attorney General Ortega Díaz released a video where Euzenando Prazeres de Azevedo, the former director of Odebrecht in Venezuela, declared to the Attorney General's Office of Brazil that Maduro had received US$35 million to finance his presidential campaign in 2013. In In the recording, Prazeres de Azevedo tells that Américo Mata, whom he identified as a representative of Maduro, contacted him to request money for Maduro's campaign.

== See also ==
- Odebrecht–Car Wash leniency agreement
- Offshoots of Operation Car Wash
- Phases of Operation Car Wash
