= Brazilian Anti-Corruption Act =

National Congress
- Long title: Law No. 12,846 of 1 August 2013
- Citation: PL 6826/2010
- Territorial extent: Worldwide
- Passed by: Chamber of Deputies
- Passed: 19 June 2013
- Passed by: Federal Senate
- Passed: 4 July 2013
- Signed by: President Dilma Rousseff
- Signed: 1 August 2013
- Commenced: 28 January 2014

Legislative history

Initiating chamber: Chamber of Deputies
- Bill title: Law Project 6826/2010
- Bill citation: PL 6826/2010
- Introduced by: Executive Power
- Introduced: 18 February 2010
- First reading: 26 February 2010
- Second reading: 27 May 2013

Revising chamber: Federal Senate
- Bill title: Chamber Law Project 39/2013
- First reading: 19 June 2013

Summary
- Provides for the administrative and civil liability of legal entities for the practice of acts against the public administration, national or foreign, and makes other provisions.

Keywords
- Anti-corruption, administrative law
- Status: In force

The Brazilian Anti-Corruption Act (Portuguese: Lei anticorrupção), officially Law No. 12,846 of 1 August 2013 and commonly known as the Clean Company Act (Lei da Empresa Limpa), is a Brazilian law enacted in 2013 targeting corrupt practices among legal entities doing business in Brazil. It defines civil and administrative penalties, as well as the possibility of reduction in penalties for cooperation with law enforcement under a written leniency agreement signed and agreed to between the companies and the government.

The law is directed only at juridical persons which includes corporations and other institutions, but not individuals, who are covered by other laws.

The Act has been invoked numerous times, resulting in leniency agreements returning billions of reals to the Brazilian Treasury, notably the agreement with Odebrecht S.A., which by itself was responsible for twelve billion reals.

== History ==
The anti-corruption law is directed at legal entities (pessoas jurídicas) only. This includes corporations and other institutions, but not individuals (pessoas físicas). Under this law, corporations are administratively and civilly liable for acts of corruption. Criminal liability in Brazil due to acts of corruption applies only to individuals, so there is no possibility of criminal liability for a corporation. Corruption and other criminal acts by a company or other business organization can result in criminal sanctions only for its employees, partners or other natural persons who have committed the acts, and the public prosecutor may decide to charge them with criminal acts punishable by prison, but that is a separate juridical procedure targeting a "natural person".

To avoid more serious penalties resulting from corruption investigations, companies may decide to cooperate with the investigation voluntarily, and enter into a leniency agreement as prescribed by the law. This may reduce their fines by up to two thirds. Other advantages to self-disclosure and signing a leniency agreement include exemption from other provisions of the Clean Company Act which otherwise requires publication of the legal decision imposing the fines, a prohibition from receiving grants from public institutions, and restrictions on taking part in bids on public projects.

The law was amended in 2015 to make certain improvements based on experience up to that point. Provisional Measure 703/2015 made it easier for companies to apply for the benefits of a leniency agreement, and also changed the nature of the benefits. The previous cap for reduction in penalties was 2/3, and this law changed the cap to 100%. Formerly, only the first company to apply for leniency were permitted, and only before a lawsuit had commenced. These provisions were removed. The amendment also established a compliance, audit, and reporting requirement which was added to the law.

== Leniency agreements ==
Leniency agreements (Acordo de Leniência) are defined under the Brazilian Anti-corruption Act in article 16. They target Brazilian companies and foreign companies with a presence in Brazil who are involved in corruption investigations. Under the law, companies are responsible for corruption and can face heavy penalties, a restriction on participation in future bids, confiscation of their assets, suspension of business activity, or dissolution.

=== Related agreements ===
Brazilian companies have been involved in corruption investigations in countries outside Brazil, some in collaboration with Brazilian justice, and have paid fines in agreements reached in such procedures. The most notable case was the investigation of Brazilian construction corporation Odebrecht carried out by the United States and Switzerland with the cooperation of the Brazilian government. As a result of the investigation into kickbacks paid to hundreds of politicians, including presidential candidates, as well as to judges on the Supreme Federal Court, Odebrecht agreed to pay a record fine of R$6 billion ($1.5 billion) in a leniency agreement. in a case described by attorney general Deltan Dallagnol as the "largest damages agreement in the history of the world".

=== Examples ===
Some leniency agreements signed by July 2018 include:

- SBM Offshore: R$1.22 billion ($309 million)
- Odebrecht: R$2.72 billion ($690 million)
- MullenLowe and FCB Brasil: R$53.1 million ($13.5 million)
- Bilfinger: R$9.8 million ($2.5 million)
- UTC Engenharia: R$574 million ($146 million)

=== Comparison with plea bargains ===
Clean Company leniency agreements in Brazil apply exclusively to juridical persons, i.e., corporations or other business entities, but not individuals, and are not the same as plea bargain agreements (colaboração premiada (Note: Colaboração premiada – literally, "rewarded collaboration"; the common name for the legal process known as delação premiada (Note: Delação premiada – literally, "rewarded whistleblowing" (or, "informing). A legal process by which a suspect is offered a specific reduced sentence prescribed by law, in return for turning in accomplices, or aiding in investigations. The common name for it in Brazil is colaboração premiada ("rewarded collaboration"). The concept is similar to a plea bargain, in return for investigative assistance.) in Brazil; which is a type of plea bargain involving informing or collaborating with investigations in return for specific reductions in sentence prescribed by the law.)) which apply only to natural persons, i.e., people. Plea bargain agreements may be reached with executives or employees of those corporations to avoid personal fines or prison time.

Individuals accused of involvement in corruption schemes may enter into plea bargains with the Public Prosecutor's Office (MPF) on their own. These individual agreements are known commonly as Portuguese: colaboração premiada, lit. 'rewarded collaboration', and officially as Portuguese: delação premiada, lit. 'rewarded whistleblowing'.

Although leniency agreements and plea bargains under Brazilian law are similar in the sense that they both have legally defined reductions in penalties, monetary on the one hand, monetary or prison time on the other, their differences under Portuguese law is clear: the acordo de leniência is civil and administrative, and applies exclusively to juridical persons (business entities); the colaboração premiada (a.k.a. delação premiada) are for people only. They are covered by different laws. Some English sources which translate these terms observe the distinction, and others may be more lax, and confuse the two; they may use the term plea bargain (or plea deal) for both.

The first page of the affidavit between the United States Department of Justice and Odebrecht was filed in District Court in New York, and names it as a "plea agreement" (number 16-643), with the parties involved in the agreement named as "United States of America" and "Odebrecht, S.A., defendant", in which it specified a 25% reduction in penalties in exchange for the investigation assistance already provided and other remedies.

== Related laws ==
Other important anti-corruption laws passed in Brazil include laws such as Law No. 12,527 of 18 November 2011 (Freedom of Information Act), Law No. 12,813 of 16 May 2013 (Conflict of Interests Act; Conflito de Interesses), Law No. 12,850 of 2 August 2013 (Organized Crime Act; Lei das organizações criminosas), and Law No. 12,683 of 9 July 2012 (amended the Money Laundering Act) (Note: For Money Laundering Act, see pt:Compliance#Compliance no Brasil)

== Innovation ==
Before the regulation of the law, the culture of Brazilian legislation only punished those who received bribes, that is, the corrupt, however, with the Anti-Corruption Law or Clean Company Law, it mandates that those who corrupt, the corporate corruptor, are also held accountable and punished.

== See also ==
- Brazilian currency
- Caixa 2
- Constitution of Brazil
- Corruption in Brazil
- Crime in Brazil
- Economy of Brazil
- Federal Police of Brazil
- Industry in Brazil
- Judiciary of Brazil
- Law enforcement in Brazil
- Law of Brazil
- List of companies of Brazil
- Operation Car Wash
- Penal Code of Brazil
- Politics of Brazil
- Public Prosecutor's Office (Brazil)
- International Anti-Corruption Day
