= Raymundo Faoro =

Raimundo Faoro
- Born: 1925
- Died: 2003 (aged 77–78)
- Occupations: Lawyer, jurist, sociologist, historian, writer

Raymundo Faoro (27 April 1925, in Vacaria – 15 May 2003, in Rio de Janeiro) was a lawyer, jurist, sociologist, historian, writer and president of the Brazilian Bar Association (OAB). Even though lawyers have an extensive presence in the political arena of Brazil, not one president after Faoro gained the same intellectual respect as he did.

Faoro was the author of several books. Often considered the most important of those was "Os Donos do Poder" (The Owners of Power). In this book, Faoro described the history of power in Brazil from pre-colonial times to approximately the end of Getúlio Vargas's first term.

In this book, Faoro gave special attention to the category of "estamento", or Stand, which he notes was a classification used by Karl Marx but mistranslated in the English and French translations of his German work. This "Stand", which he differentiates clearly from the ruling "Elite", was dominant in the creation of modern Brazil.

According to Faoro, this "Stand", a strange mixture of the nobility, the bureaucrats and the military, always attempted to use the power and wealth of the State to benefit themselves, thereby preventing the masses from ruling the country in the benefit of the majority.

He also wrote books on Brazilian social and political thought, on the writer and poet Machado de Assis and on Brazilian modern society and politics.

Faoro's book became one of the reference points for the understanding of Brazilian society. It influenced Brazilian and Brazilianist sociology, historiography and political science. Other books that gained such recognition were Sergio Buarque de Holanda's Raizes do Brasil, Gilberto Freyre's Casa Grande e Senzala, and Caio Prado Junior's Formação do Brasil Contemporâneo.
