= Chevron Pasadena Refinery =

American refinery company

Coordinates: 29.7185°N 95.2100°W

Chevron Pasadena Refinery.
- Company type: Subsidiary
- Industry: Oil and Gasoline
- Founded: 1920
- Headquarters: Pasadena, Texas, U.S.
- Owner: Chevron Corporation
- Number of employees: 48,600 (Chevron Corporation)
- Parent: Chevron Corporation
- Website: pasadena.chevron.com

Chevron Pasadena Refinery is a refinery located in Pasadena, Texas, United States.

== History ==
According to an article published in the Daily Oil, the market suspected that company owner Henry Rosenberg was preparing to sell the company. The refinery reported a loss of 829.4 million dollars in 1998, partially due to a union boycott. Rosenberg was also facing credit issues.

An August 2000 document from the Golnoy Barge Company showed $66.6 million in net sales (EBITDALL) in the first six months of 2000 and $5.6 million net income in the first half of 2000, compared to a loss of $22 million a year earlier. This document also stated that "anyone who wanted to purchase the Central Crown in 2000 should be prepared to refinance the debt of $125 million." In 2003, this debt had risen to $200 million.

Members felt that in 2000 these values could be $83 million higher than what was officially reported. The refinery had a capacity to store more than 6 million barrels, so the value of these stocks could even exceed $1 billion. In November 2005, Petrobras signed an MoU with Astra Oil Company with the goal of establishing a joint operation of refining and marketing in the US. The acquisition was completed in September 2006. The total amount paid was $360 million: $190 million for 50% of the shares and $170 million for the refinery stocks.

Disagreements among the partners led to Astra requesting the right to sell its remaining 50% to Petrobras. This right only existed because Brazil had the final say about the direction and future investments in the refinery. If the Astra did not agree, they would have the option to sell and Petrobras would have the option to buy.

An arbitration confirmed this right in April 2009 and set the value of the second half of the refinery at $296 million, plus $170 million for its share of the stock, totaling US$466 million. This amount was supplemented by an additional $173 million corresponding to a refund of part of a bank guarantee by partners, interest, fees and court costs. The total arbitration value was $639 million. On March 10, 2010, the Federal Court in Houston, Texas, USA, confirmed the judgment, finding that PAI would be the holder of the Pasadena refinery and trading company.

In June 2012, an extrajudicial agreement that provided for the termination of arbitration and other lawsuits, plus interest and legal costs, totaled $820 million. Part of this amount, $750 million, had already been accrued for payment in the financial statements of Petrobras, leaving the additional provision of $70 million to be recognized in the income statement in the second quarter of 2012.

Petrobras acquired the Pasadena refinery as well as Astra Trading, the commercial arm of the refinery. The debt inherited in the acquisition is unknown.

Chevron U.S.A. Inc. announced on May 1, 2019, that it had acquired from Petrobras America Inc. all the outstanding shares and equity interests of Pasadena Refining System, Inc. (PRSI) and PRSI Trading LLC for $350 million, excluding working capital.
