= Eduardo Cunha =

Brazilian politician and economist

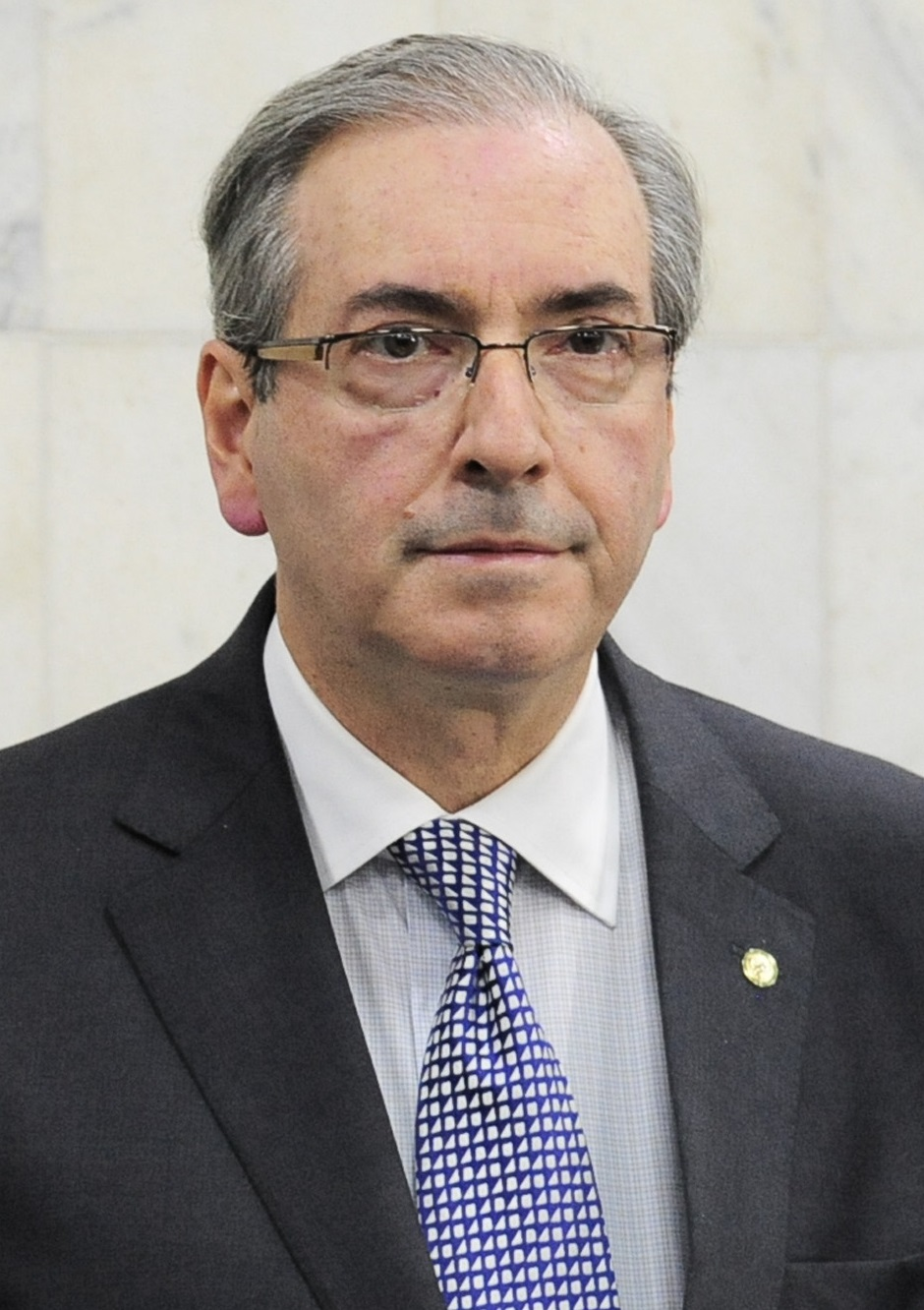
- Cunha in June 2015

President of the Chamber of Deputies
- In office 1 February 2015 – 7 July 2016; Suspended: 5 May 2016 – 7 July 2016
- Preceded by: Henrique Eduardo Alves
- Succeeded by: Rodrigo Maia

Member of the Chamber of Deputies
- In office 1 February 2003 – 12 September 2016; Suspended: 5 May 2016 – 12 September 2016
- Constituency: Rio de Janeiro

State Deputy of Rio de Janeiro
- In office 9 January 2001 – 1 February 2003
- Constituency: At-large

Personal details
- Born: Eduardo Cosentino da Cunha; 29 September 1958 (age 68) Rio de Janeiro, Brazil
- Party: Republicanos (2024–present)
- Other political affiliations: PRN (1989–1995); PPB (1995–2003); MDB (2003–2022); PTB (2022–2023); Independent (2023–2024)
- Spouses: Cristina Bastos Dytz (m. 1987; div. 1994) Cláudia Cruz (m. 1996)
- Children: 4, including Dani
- Education: Candido Mendes University
- Criminal information
- Known for: Impeachment of Dilma Rousseff; Operation Car Wash; Panama Papers
- Status: House arrest (temporarily) (Note: Cunha is in house arrest due to the risk of contraction of COVID-19.)
- Convictions: Passive corruption; Money laundry; Foreign exchange fraud; Process corruption
- Penalty: 14 years and 6 months for passive corruption, money laundry and foreign exchange fraud; 24 years and 10 months for process corruption

Eduardo Cosentino da Cunha (born 29 September 1958), is a Brazilian politician and radio host, born in Rio de Janeiro. He was President of the Chamber of Deputies of Brazil from February 2015 until 5 May 2016, when he was removed from the position by the Supreme Court. BBC News labeled him the "nemesis" of Brazilian President Dilma Rousseff.

He was indicted in the scandal known as Operation Car Wash (Portuguese: Operação Lava Jato) involving the state-owned oil company Petrobras and other corporations. Cunha was suspended as speaker of the Chamber of Deputies by the Supreme Court on the request of the Prosecutor-General due to allegations that he had attempted to intimidate members of Congress and obstructed investigations into his alleged bribe-taking. Cunha resigned from his position later, on 7 July 2016, after a disciplinary process in Congress that had lasted nine months, making it the longest in Brazilian Congressional history.

A series of legal manoeuvres had stalled the process and kept Cunha in charge of the Chamber of Deputies. While the Chamber's Commission of Ethics was divided on the issue until June, the Chamber of Deputies plenary, on 12 September 2016, voted 450–10 in favour of stripping Cunha of his position as federal deputy for breaching parliamentary decorum by lying about secret offshore bank accounts.

On 19 October 2016, Cunha was arrested by the Brazilian Federal Police, accused of hiding approximately US$40 million worth of bribes in secret bank accounts and on trying to tamper with investigations against him.

== Personal life ==
Born in Rio de Janeiro on 29 September 1958, Eduardo Cunha is the son of Elcy Teixeira da Cunha and Elza Cosentino. As his mother descended from Italian immigrants from the town of Castelluccio Inferiore in the region of Basilicata, he also holds Italian citizenship. When he was 14 years old, he began working part-time as an insurance broker. Later, he worked as an auditor at the firm Arthur Andersen, from 1978 to 1980. He majored in economics at the Universidade Candido Mendes, and served as an economist at Xerox of Brazil, between 1980 and 1982.

Cunha has four children. He is currently married to journalist Cláudia Cruz.

== Political views ==
Eduardo Cunha is a conservative Evangelical Christian. He seeks to ban abortion, increase marijuana penalties, and further restrict homosexual activity. As an evangelist, Cunha has proposed legislation titled The Law of Heterophobia (in response to the Law of Homophobia). The law demands a prison sentence of one to three years for anyone who forbids entry to a heterosexual to any public or private property, levies special rates at hotels or restricts the public display of affection.

== Political career ==
=== Elections with PDS and PMDB ===
His first contact with politics was working on the campaigns of Eliseu Resende, a candidate for state government with the Social Democratic Party (PDS) in the 1982 election, and Moreira Franco, a PMDB candidate for Rio de Janeiro government, in the 1986 election. When Anthony Garotinho was elected Governor of Rio de Janeiro in 1999, he appointed Francisco Silva as Secretary of Housing with Cunha as his deputy. However, Cunha was in office for just over six months, when he was forced to resign due to allegations of irregularities in no-bid contracts and favoring shell companies. Then in 2001, the Court of Audit confirmed that there were indeed various irregularities in the bids of these shell companies, including the adulteration of the clearance certificate from state taxes.

=== State Representative (2001–2002) ===
With Garotinho's support, in 2001 Cunha assumed a vacant state representative's seat in the Legislative Assembly of Rio de Janeiro (ALERJ), which guaranteed him immunity against the public prosecutor's investigations. He was then elected with 101,495 votes in the follow-up campaign.

=== Federal Representative (2003–2016) ===
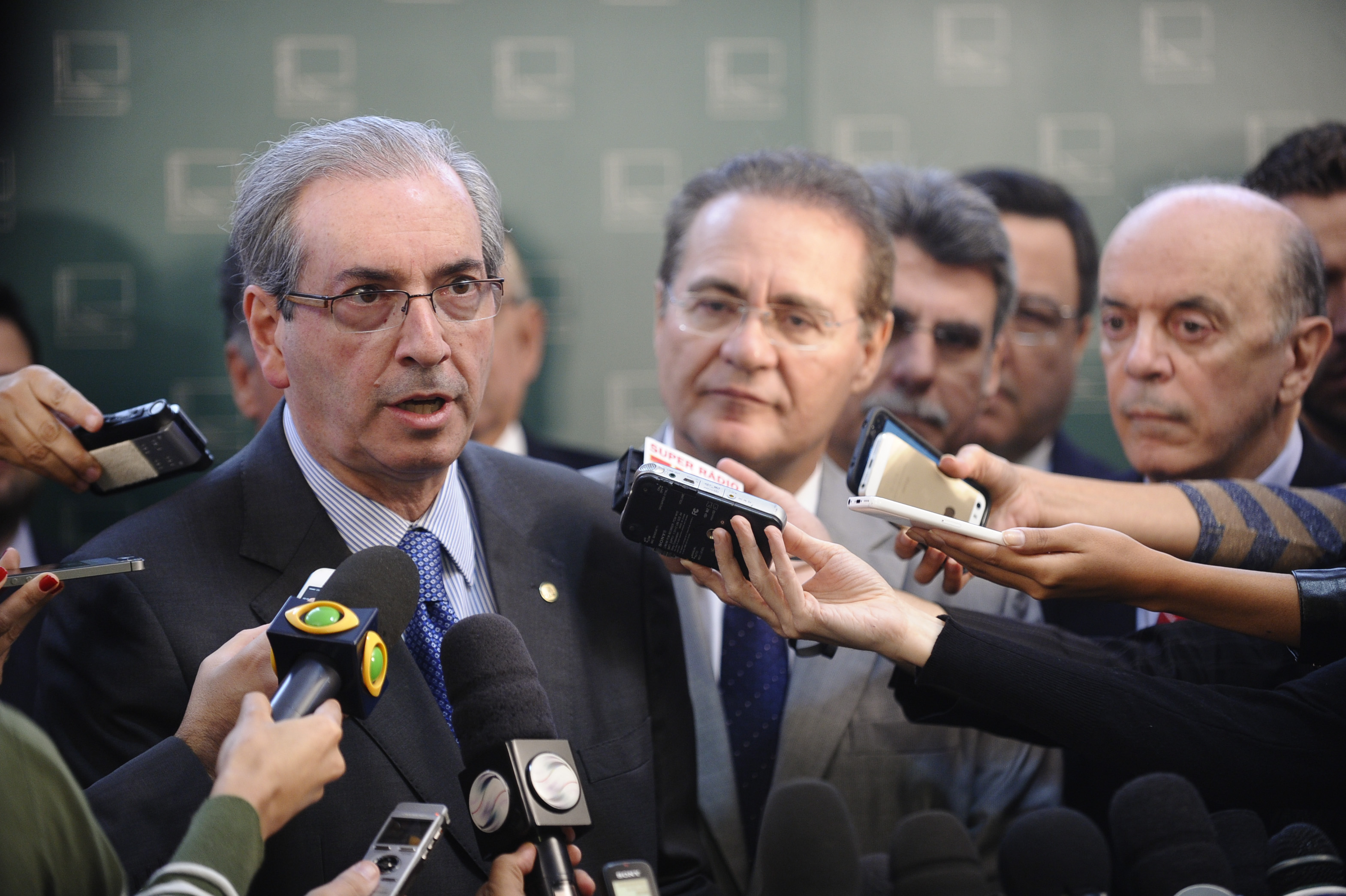
Cunha holds a joint press conference with the President of the Federal Senate, Renan Calheiros, and other Congress members, 21 May 2015.

Cunha joined the Brazilian Chamber of Deputies on 1 February 2003, representing Rio de Janeiro. He was elected in the 2006 elections to the House with 130,773 votes. He was re-elected in 2010 through the PMDB with 150,616 votes. To the TSE (Brazilian Election Commission), Cunha reported receiving R$4.76 million in donations for the 2010 campaign, of which R$500,000 came from the construction company Camargo Corrêa.

In 2013, Cunha was elected leader of the PMDB in the House. The following year, he filed a complaint with the Supreme Federal Court against now-Congressman Anthony Garotinho (PR-RJ) for libel and defamation. On his blog Garotinho had referred to Cunha as a "deputy lobbyist". House aides and lobbyists with access to PMDB parliamentarians reported that Eduardo Cunha recorded on a notebook a list of companies - mainly linked to energy, telecommunications and construction - who benefited from parliamentary action. Still, later that year, he was re-elected for another term, obtaining 232,708 votes (the third-most votes received in the State of Rio de Janeiro).

On April 6, 2016, El País reported that Cunha and others under investigation on Operation Car Wash had accounts in offshore companies opened by the Panamanian firm Mossack Fonseca, which specializes in concealing assets using companies based in tax havens.

Cunha was indicted in Operation Car Wash (Operação Lava Jato), the scandal involving state-owned oil company Petrobras. Prosecutors say he "took as much as US$40 million in bribes for himself and his allies, plundering Petrobras, the government-controlled oil company, while laundering money through an evangelical megachurch." On these charges, prosecutors requested "a potential sentence of 184 years in prison". During this period, Cunha led the movement to impeach President Dilma Rousseff for manipulating figures in government accounts. He was suspended as speaker of the lower house by Brazil's supreme court on 5 May 2016, because of allegations he had attempted to intimidate members of congress, and obstructed the ongoing Car Wash investigation into alleged bribe-taking. In September 2016 the lower house voted with a large majority to strip Cunha of his seat in the lower house and to ban him from politics for eight years. Once removed from office Cunha was no longer immune to criminal prosecution.

=== Arrest, sentencing, and pending litigation (2016–present) ===
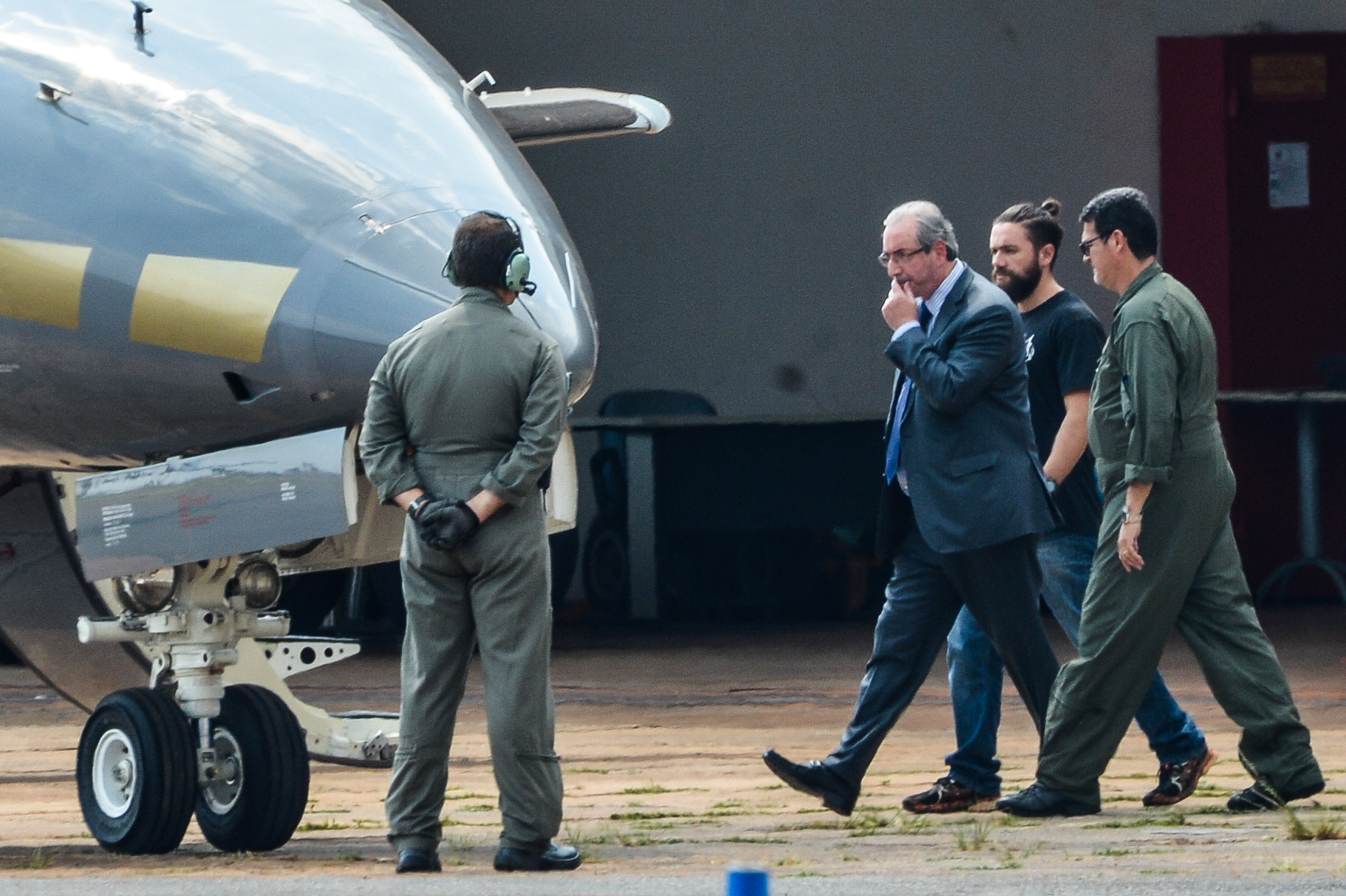
Cunha being arrested on 19 October 2016

Cunha was arrested on 19 October 2016 in Brasília and sent to the Complexo Médico Penal de Pinhais, a prison in the Curitiba metropolitan area, to await trial. Ordering preventive detention, federal judge Sergio Moro cited risks to "public order, as well as a concrete possibility of flight given his access to hidden resources abroad", and also his dual nationality. On 30 March 2017, he found him guilty of corruption, tax evasion, and money laundering related to the Car Wash scheme, and sentenced him to 15 years and 4 months in prison. A federal court decided 18 July 2017 that Cunha should remain in jail in connection with separate bribery charges related to Length-of-Service Guarantee Fund (FGTS), linked to Caixa Econômica Federal.

Cunha has two additional criminal charges. One pertains to his alleged involvement in Operation Sépis and the other, to accusations he received $5 million in bribes from ship construction contracts at Petrobrás. In addition, Cunha is the respondent in civil proceedings over alleged "illicit advantages" he gave favored contractors in Petrobrás contract bidding. Cunha had previously faced charges of living rent-free in an apartment owned by a money-dealer, embezzlement and laundering money through his megachurch. In May 2017, according to recordings obtained by O Globo, Brazilian President Michel Temer instructed Joesley Batista of the meatpacking conglomerate JBS S.A. to continue making payoffs to Cunha. Batista allegedly recorded the conversation as part of a plea bargain. As of July 2017, the Brazilian justice system still had not identified the owners of eleven offshore accounts that together received $4 million US from José Henriques in connection with the purchase of an oilfield in Benin. Henrique made payments to a total of 15 accounts, including Cunha's Orion SP.

Cunha had previously been accused by Marcio Faria da Silva, a former vice president of Odebrecht, in testimony he proffered for a plea bargain in his own criminal case, of negotiating a $40 million US campaign donation to the PMDB. He denies doing this. The PMDB government of Rio de Janeiro, described as "ideologically malleable", reportedly demanded enormous kickbacks, roughly 5% of the total cost of the construction projects that were part of the Olympics, and the work performed for the inflated costs involved was notoriously shabby.

== See also ==
- Michel Temer
- Operation Car Wash
- Panama Papers
- Impeachment of Dilma Rousseff
- Impeachment proposals against Michel Temer
- Geddel Vieira Lima
- 2016 in Brazil
- Petrobras
- Mensalão
- 2014 Brazilian general elections
- Jair Bolsonaro
- Odebrecht
- Paradise Papers
- Odebrecht
- 2017 in Brazil
- Delcídio do Amaral
- Joesley Batista
- JBS S.A.
- List of scandals in Brazil

== Notes ==
Political offices
Preceded by Henrique Eduardo Alves	President of the Chamber of Deputies; 2015–2016	Succeeded by Waldir Maranhão; Acting
