= Pinhal Grande =

Municipality of Rio Grande do Sul, Brazil

- Municipality
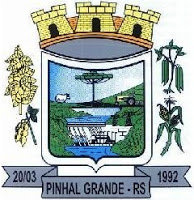
- Flag Coat of arms

- Location in Rio Grande do Sul state

- Location in Brazil
- Coordinates: 29°20′46″S 53°18′24″W
- Country: Brazil
- Region: South
- State: Rio Grande do Sul
- Mesoregion: Centro Ocidental Rio-Grandense
- Microregion: Santiago

Area
  - Total: 477.13 km^{2} (184.22 sq mi)
- Elevation: 394 m (1,293 ft)

Population (2022)
  - Total: 3,805
  - Density: 7.975/km^{2} (20.65/sq mi)
- Time zone: UTC−3 (BRT)
- Postal code: 98150-xxx
- Area code: +55 51
- Website: www.pinhalgrande.rs.gov.br

Pinhal Grande (Portuguese meaning "large pine forest") is a municipality of the central part of the state of Rio Grande do Sul, Brazil.

== Geography ==
The population is 3,805 (2022 census) in an area of 477.13 km^{2}. Its elevation is 394 m. It is located 320 km west of the state capital of Porto Alegre, northeast of Alegrete and east of Santo Ângelo. Pinhal Grande is located in the Planalto Médio, one of the pine species found is the Araucaria angustifolia.

The municipality is partly flooded by the reservoir of the Dona Francisca Hydroelectric Plant on the upper Jacuí River.

=== Bounding municipalities ===
- Júlio de Castilhos
- Nova Palma
- Estrela Velha
- Ibarama

== History ==
The first inhabitants of the region were indigenous tribes. The Portuguese dominion explored and later claimed the lands until 1822 when Brazil gained independence. In 1813, the Curitibano João Gonçalves Padilha along with his brother initiated agricultural commerce between the region and São Paulo.

The area received immigration and integrated the 4ª Colônia de Imigração Italiana (4th Colony of Italian Immigration). As a result, it includes people of Italian, Portuguese and Spanish descent.

The municipality Pinhal Grande was created under Law nº 9600 20 March 1992.

== See also ==
- List of municipalities in Rio Grande do Sul
