= Santiago, Rio Grande do Sul =

Municipality of Rio Grande do Sul, Brazil

Santiago
- Municipality
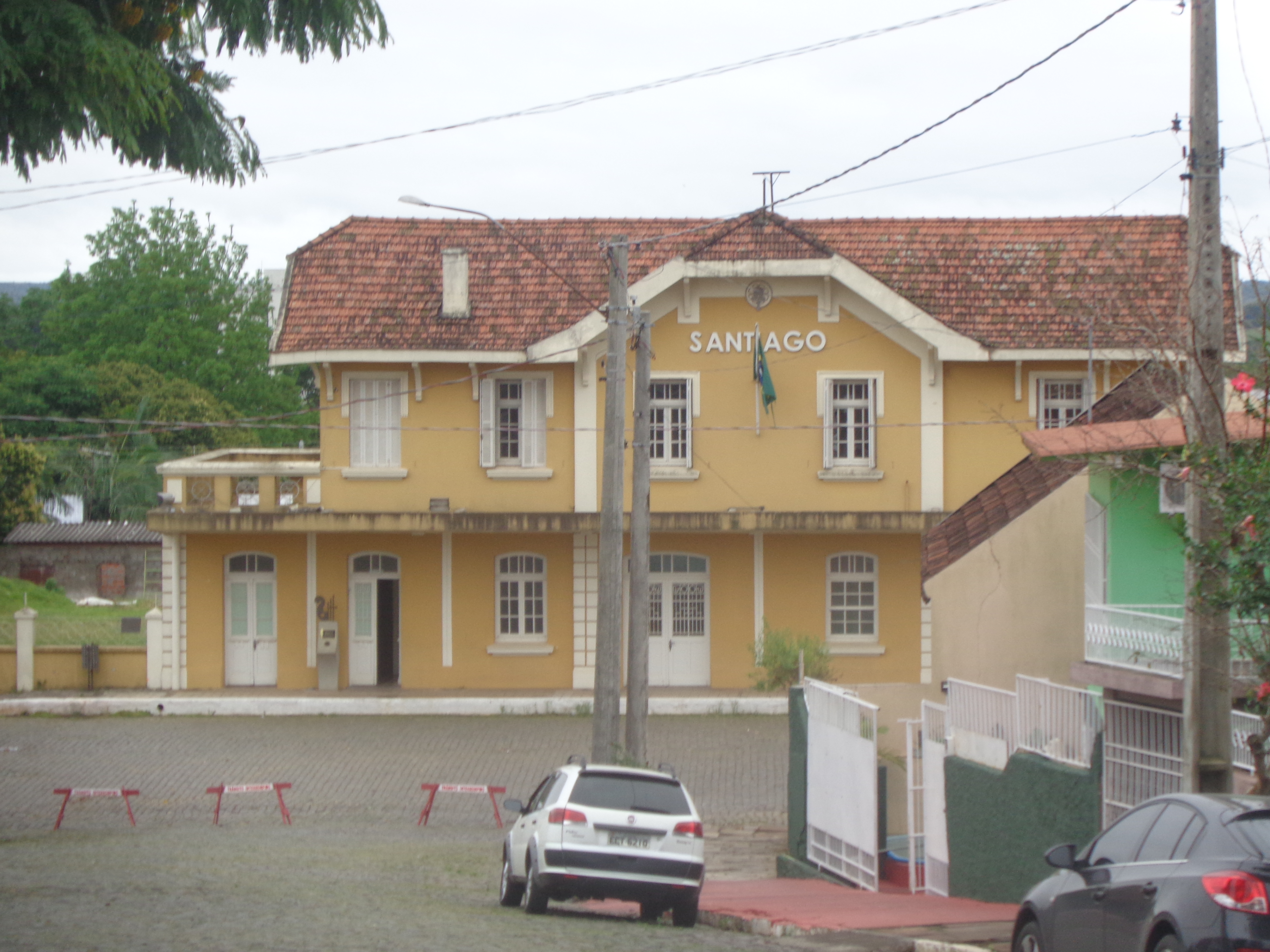

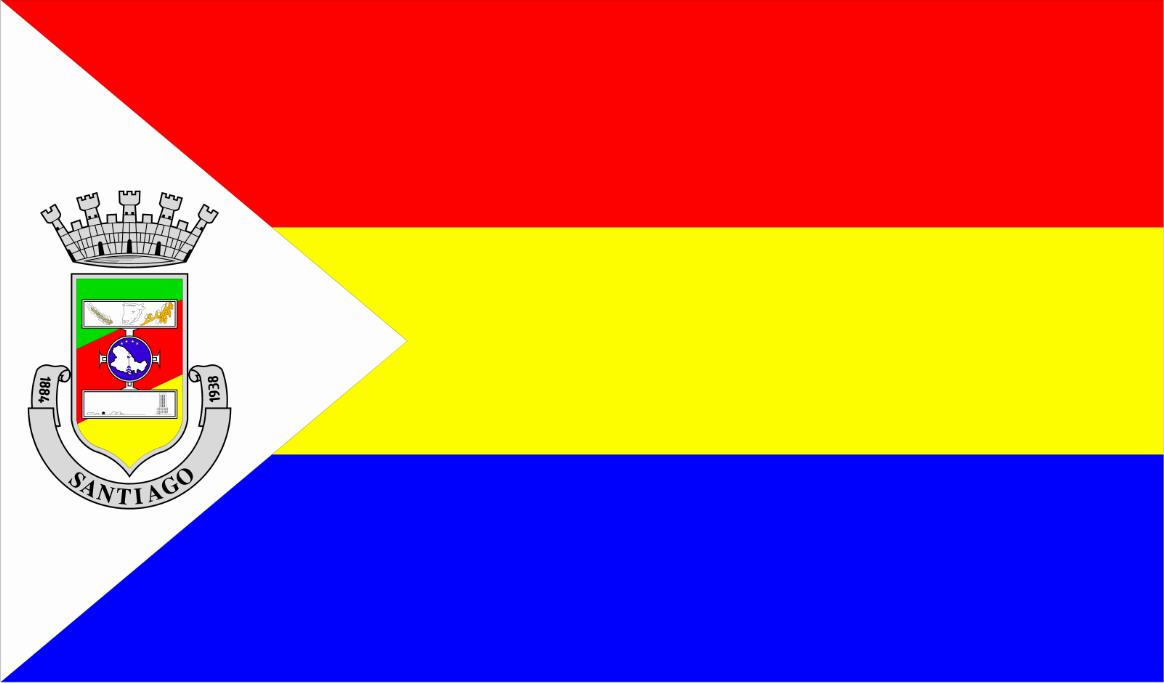
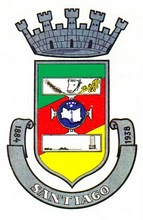
- Flag Coat of arms

- Location in Brazil
- Coordinates: 29°11′30″S 54°52′2″W
- Country: Brazil
- Region: South
- State: Rio Grande do Sul
- Mesoregion: Centro Ocidental Rio-Grandense
- Microregion: Santiago

Area
  - Total: 2,413.13 km^{2} (931.71 sq mi)
- Elevation: 409 m (1,342 ft)

Population (2022)
  - Total: 48,938
  - Density: 20.280/km^{2} (52.525/sq mi)
- Time zone: UTC−3 (BRT)
- Website: www.santiago.rs.gov.br

Santiago (Spanish meaning Saint James) is a municipality of the western part of the state of Rio Grande do Sul, Brazil. It is the capital of the microregion of Santiago. The population is 48,938 (2022 census) in an area of 2,413.13 km^{2} (931.71 sq mi). Its elevation is 409 m. It is located 450 km west of the state capital of Porto Alegre and northeast of Alegrete. The nickname of the city is "The Land of the Poets".

Santiago Airport serves the city.

== Neighboring municipalities ==
- Bossoroca
- Capão do Cipó
- Tupanciretã
- Jari
- Jaguari
- Nova Esperança do Sul
- São Francisco de Assis
- Itacurubi

== History ==
In about 1860, settlement of the region began. The colony was first founded by 350 Germans, 14 Belgians, 5 French persons and 4 Swiss persons. Colonel José Maria Pereira de Campos created and organized the colony of Ijuí and brought Europeans to the area. The Italians arrived in the 1880s, as the century passed, with the establishment of the colony of Jaguari, the localities of Sanga da Areia and Ernesto Alves. In 1834, Arsene Isabelle, a French diplomat, in ways between the area, refers to a locality of Boqueirão de Santiago, its existence of three to four ranches. The Germans and the Italians form a large influx of European immigration, a mixture with other nationalities which saw Belgians, Swiss, Polish and French immigration. In synthesis, the colonies were established in 1860 and had diverse types of citizens in the municipality of Santiago, with no other municipalities, the population became predominantly of European descent.

== Education ==
Santiago has a campus of the Universidade Regional Integrada do Alto Uruguai e das Missões

== Communications ==
=== Radio ===
- Rádio Nova 99 FM Website, Live broadcast
- Verdes Pampas FM Website, Live broadcast
- Rádio Santiago AM Website

=== Portal de Internet e Notícias ===
- Portal Terra dos Poetas

== Notable residents ==
- Luiz Carlos Prates: Radio-journalist and psychologist

== See also ==
- List of municipalities in Rio Grande do Sul
