= Quevedos =

Municipality of Rio Grande do Sul, Brazil

- Municipality
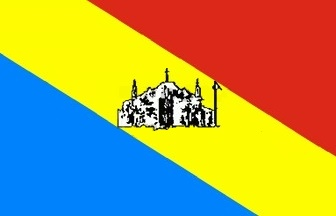
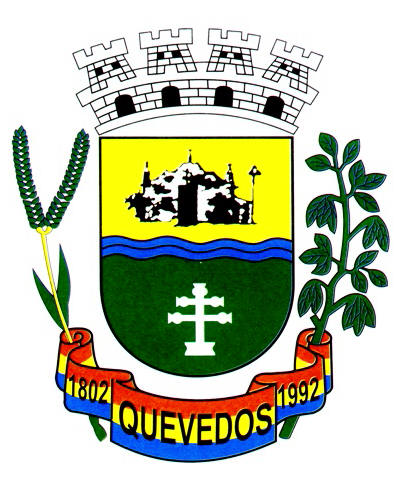
- Flag Coat of arms

- Location in Rio Grande do Sul state

- Location in Brazil
- Coordinates: 29°21′9″S 54°4′18″W
- Country: Brazil
- Region: South
- State: Rio Grande do Sul
- Mesoregion: Centro Ocidental Rio-Grandense
- Microregion: Santiago

Area
  - Total: 543.36 km^{2} (209.79 sq mi)
- Elevation: 410 m (1,350 ft)

Population (2022)
  - Total: 2,507
  - Density: 4.614/km^{2} (11.95/sq mi)
- Time zone: UTC−3 (BRT)
- Postal code: 98150-xxx
- Website: web.archive.org/web/20110706160107/http://www.quevedos.rs.gov.br/

Quevedos is a municipality in the west-central part of the state of Rio Grande do Sul, Brazil. The population is 2,507 (2022 census) in an area of 543.36 km². Its elevation is 410 m. It is west of the state capital, Porto Alegre, and northeast of Alegrete.

== Geography ==
Quevedos is located at a latitude of 29º21'09" S and a longitude of 54º04'18" W, at an altitude of 410 meters above sea level. The municipality covers an area of 543.36 km².

== See also ==
- List of municipalities in Rio Grande do Sul
