= Unistalda =

Municipality of Rio Grande do Sul, Brazil

- Municipality
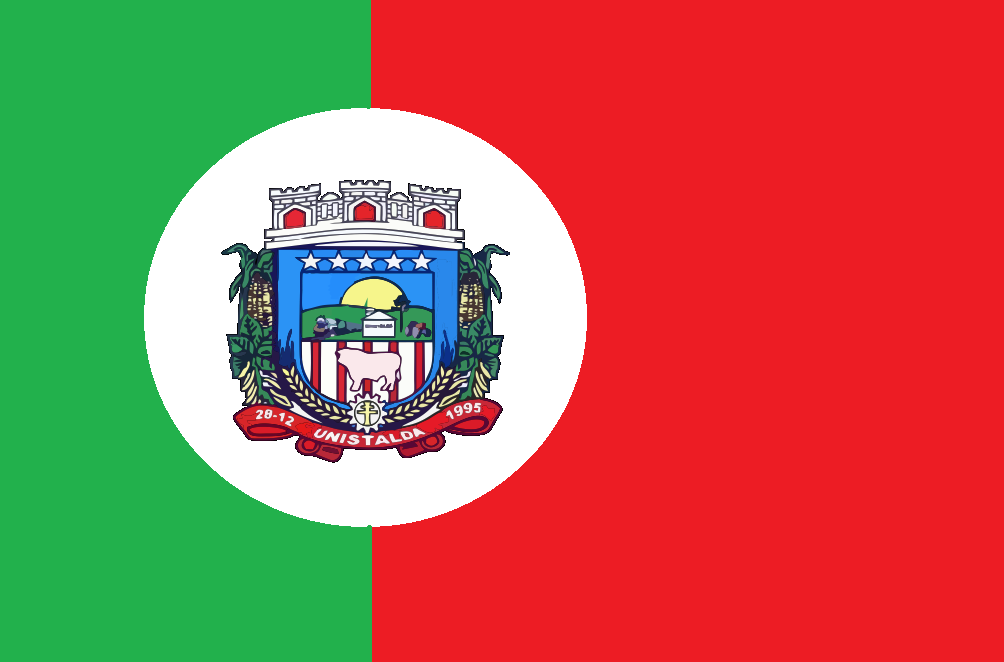
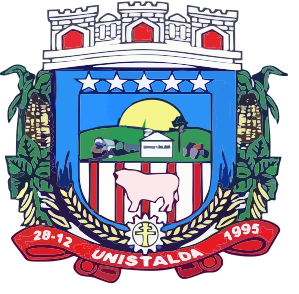
- Flag Coat of arms

- Location in Rio Grande do Sul state

- Location in Brazil
- Coordinates: 29°2′50″S 55°9′1″W
- Country: Brazil
- Region: South
- State: Rio Grande do Sul
- Mesoregion: Centro Ocidental Rio-Grandense
- Microregion: Santiago

Area
  - Total: 602.39 km^{2} (232.58 sq mi)
- Elevation: 361 m (1,184 ft)

Population (2022)
  - Total: 1,995
  - Density: 3.312/km^{2} (8.578/sq mi)
- Time zone: UTC−3 (BRT)
- Postal code: 97755-xxx
- Website: www.unistalda.rs.gov.br

Unistalda is a municipality of the western part of the state of Rio Grande do Sul, Brazil. The population is 1,995 (2022 census) in an area of 602.39 km². Its elevation is 361 m. It is located west of the state capital of Porto Alegre and northeast of Alegrete.

== See also ==
- List of municipalities in Rio Grande do Sul
