= Tupanciretã =

Municipality of Rio Grande do Sul, Brazil

- Municipality
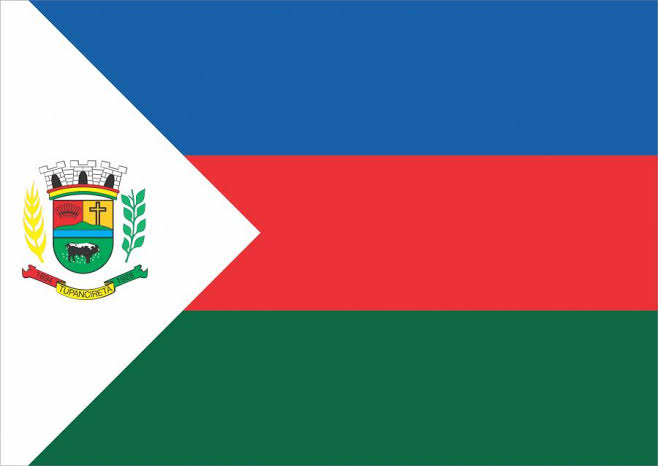
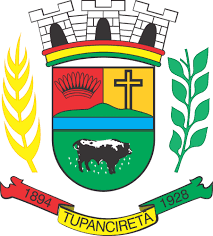
- Flag Coat of arms

- Location in Rio Grande do Sul state

- Location in Brazil
- Coordinates: 29°4′50″S 53°50′9″W
- Country: Brazil
- Region: South
- State: Rio Grande do Sul
- Mesoregion: Centro Ocidental Rio-Grandense
- Microregion: Santiago

Area
  - Total: 2,251.86 km^{2} (869.45 sq mi)
- Elevation: 465 m (1,526 ft)

Population (2022)
  - Total: 20,005
  - Density: 8.8838/km^{2} (23.009/sq mi)
- Time zone: UTC−3 (BRT)
- Postal code: 98170-000
- Website: www.tupancireta.rs.gov.br

Tupanciretã is a municipality of the western part of the state of Rio Grande do Sul, Brazil. The population is 20,005 (2022 census) in an area of 2251.86 km^{2}. Its elevation is 465 m. The name comes from the Tupi language and means "Land of the Mother God" (tupã = God + ci = mother + retã = earth) . It is located west of the state capital of Porto Alegre and northeast of Alegrete.

== Neighboring municipalities ==
- Cruz Alta
- Júlio de Castilhos

== See also ==
- List of municipalities in Rio Grande do Sul
