= Jari, Rio Grande do Sul =

Municipality of Rio Grande do Sul, Brazil

Jari
- Municipality
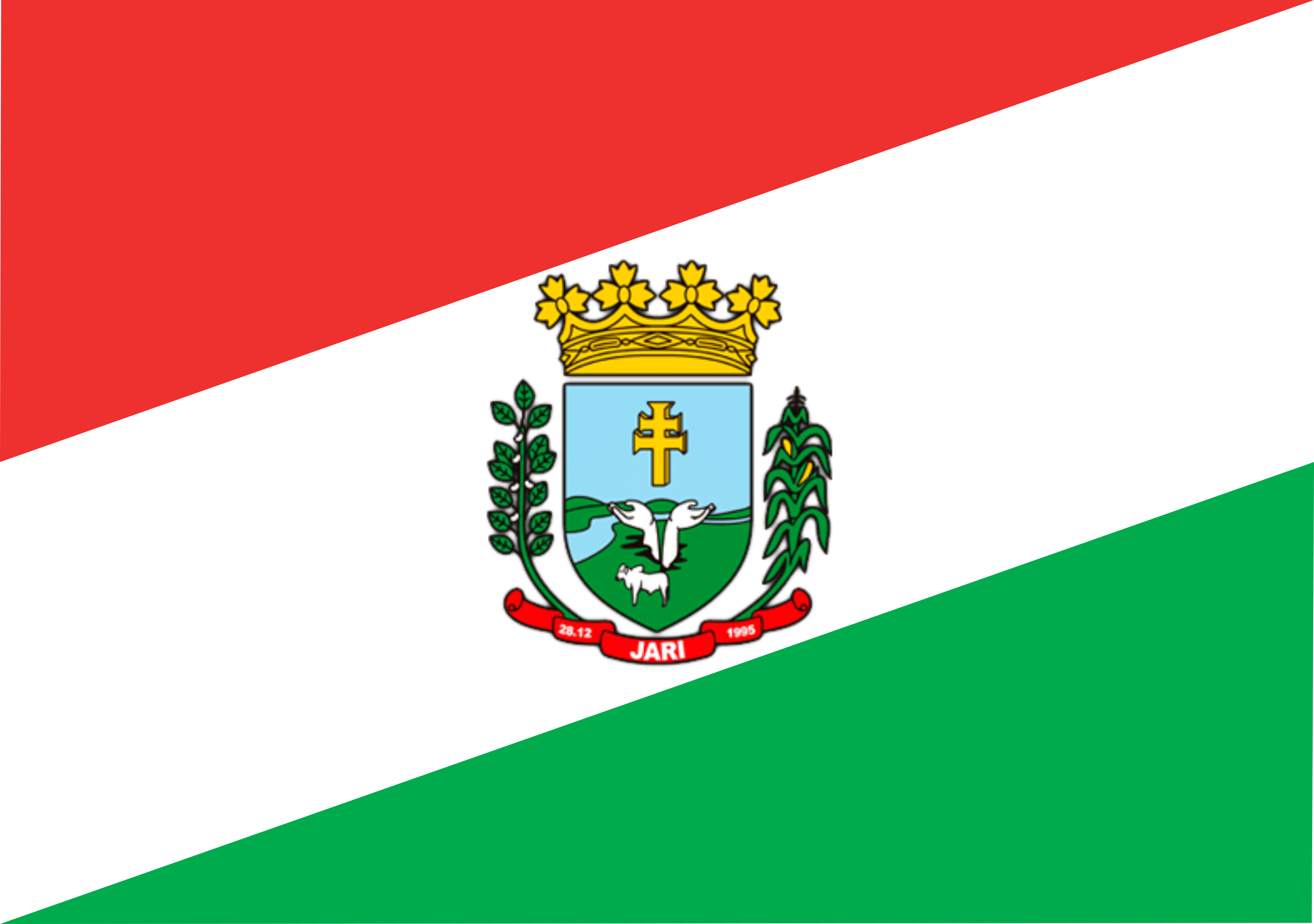
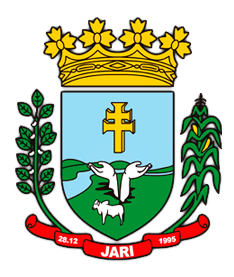
- Flag Coat of arms

- Location in Rio Grande do Sul state

- Location in Brazil
- Coordinates: 29°17′27″S 54°13′26″W
- Country: Brazil
- Region: South
- State: Rio Grande do Sul
- Mesoregion: Centro Ocidental Rio-Grandense
- Microregion: Santiago

Area
  - Total: 856.46 km^{2} (330.68 sq mi)
- Elevation: 441 m (1,447 ft)

Population (2022)
  - Total: 3,349
  - Density: 3.910/km^{2} (10.13/sq mi)
- Time zone: UTC−3 (BRT)
- Postal code: 98175-xxx
- Website: www.jari.rs.gov.br

Jari is a municipality of the western part of the state of Rio Grande do Sul, Brazil. The population is 3,349 (2022 census) in an area of 856.46 km^{2}. Its elevation is 441 m. It is located west of the state capital of Porto Alegre, northeast of Alegrete.

== See also ==
- List of municipalities in Rio Grande do Sul
