= Brazilian Congressional Bill No. 1151 =

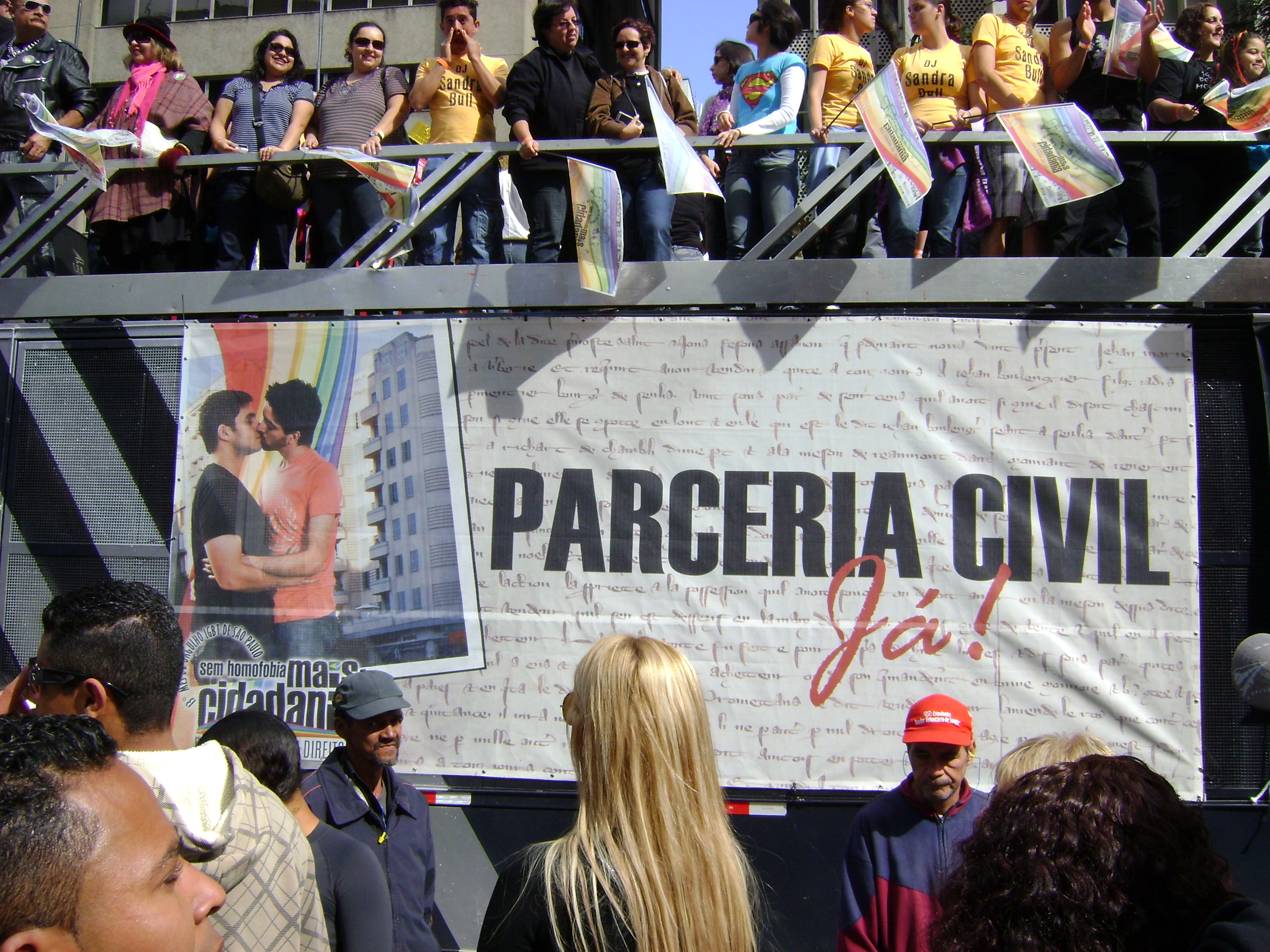
- Truck with banner in favour of the project in the 2009 São Paulo Gay Pride Parade

Chamber of Deputies
- Long title: Disciplines the civil union between same-sex people and gives other providences
- Citation: PL 1151/1995
- Territorial extent: Whole of Brazil
- Considered by: Chamber of Deputies

Legislative history
- Introduced by: Marta Suplicy (PT-SP)
- Introduced: October 26, 1995
- First reading: November 21, 1995
- Second reading: December 11, 1996

Related legislation
- ADI 4277 and ADPF 132

Keywords
- LGBT rights in Brazil; Same-sex marriage in Brazil
- Status: Pending

The Brazilian Congressional Bill project No. 1151, authored by former congresswoman Marta Suplicy, from the Workers' Party of São Paulo, aims to change Brazilian federal law in order to establish same-sex civil unions. Specifically, it aims to amend Article 1723 of the Civil Code to define a civil union as between two unmarried individuals regardless of either partner's gender.

== History ==
The bill had been pending in the Chamber of Deputies since 1995 and was the theme of the 2005 São Paulo Gay Pride Parade. It has been debated many times, but has never been brought to a vote. Then-President of the Chamber Severino Cavalcanti was expected to end debate and bring the bill to a vote in late 2005, but corruption charges forced his resignation. Despite the anticipated vote, Calvalcanti strongly opposed the bill.

In 2012, the bill was introduced into the Senate by Suplicy, who was elected in 2011 to a seat in the Senate. On May 24, 2012, it was passed by the Senate's human rights committee. It will face another vote before the Senate's Committee on Constitution, Justice and Citizenship, with a subsequent vote in the Chamber of Deputies if no action is taken by the plenary of the Senate. The bill's chances for a full congressional vote have been heightened since the Brazilian Supreme Court ruled in ADI 4277 and ADPF 132 (May 2011) that civil unions should be allowed for same-sex couples.

== See also ==
- Same-sex marriage in Brazil
- LGBTQ rights in Brazil
- Marriage, unions and partnerships by country
- LGBTQ rights by country or territory
- Timeline of LGBTQ history
