= SSST =

SSST can refer to:

- Sarajevo School of Science and Technology
- Santiago Airport (Brazil)
- GQM-163 Coyote
- Social stress
