= Daiana Santos =

Brazilian politician (born 1982)

- Santos in 2024

Member of the Chamber of Deputies
- Incumbent
- Assumed office 1 February 2023
- Constituency: Rio Grande do Sul

Member of the Municipal Chamber of Porto Alegre
- In office 1 January 2021 – 1 February 2023
- Constituency: At-large

Personal details
- Born: Daiana Silva dos Santos; 29 January 1982 (age 44) Júlio de Castilhos, Rio Grande do Sul, Brazil
- Party: PCdoB (2020–present)
- Other political affiliations: PSOL (2019–2020)
- Education: Federal University of Rio Grande do Sul
- Occupation: Public health specialist

Daiana Silva dos Santos (born 29 January 1982) is a Brazilian politician who is a member of the Communist Party of Brazil (PCdoB). After serving on the council of Porto Alegre, she was elected in late 2022 as a deputy in the federal Chamber of Deputies for the 2023 – 2027 term.

== Early life and education ==
Santos was born in the city of Júlio de Castilhos, in the southern Brazilian state of Rio Grande do Sul on 29 January 1982. She moved to the state capital of Porto Alegre at the age of 13, together with her mother, Odete, who was a domestic worker. Between 2014 and 2018 Santos studied for a degree in public health from the Federal University of Rio Grande do Sul (UFRGS), where she subsequently worked as a social health teacher.

== Political career ==
In 2020 Santos was elected to the Porto Alegre municipal council for the 2021 – 2024 term, obtaining 3,715 votes. She became the first openly lesbian councillor to be elected in the city. On the council she created the Porto Alegre Women's Fund and became its coordinator. This is a social project that supports vulnerable women who are family heads. She also developed projects to combat harassment and sexual violence, support Afro-Brazilian entrepreneurship, and support the recognition of the LGBT+ population. She became a member and president of the council's Education, Culture, Sport and Youth Committee.

Taking advantage of the visibility she obtained by being on the Porto Alegre council, Santos ran in the 2022 federal elections, also for PCdoB, for a seat in the federal Chamber of Deputies. She was elected, with 88,107 votes, for the 2023 – 2027 term. In the Chamber she serves on the Science, Technology and Innovation Committee and on the Committee on Human Rights, Minorities and Racial Equality.

== Threats ==
During her time as a politician Santos has experienced several threats, largely as a result of her being a lesbian. In particular, she has received hate messages threatening her with corrective rape. Other lesbian politicians in Brazil received similar threats, suggesting a coordinated attack against lesbians representing left-wing parties. On 29 August 2023, Santos led the first Lesbian Visibility Day in the Chamber of Deputies.
