= Same-sex marriage in Alagoas =

Same-sex marriage has been legal in Alagoas since 7 December 2011. Alagoas was the first state of Brazil to legalize same-sex marriage when its General Judicial Inspectorate ordered the state civil registry to issue marriage licences to same-sex couples. Civil unions have also been available to same-sex couples since 2011.

== Legal history ==
Stable unions (Portuguese: união estável, Brazilian Portuguese: [uniˈɐ̃w̃ isˈtavew]) have been legally performed and recognized nationwide, including in Alagoas, since May 2011 in accordance with a ruling from the Supreme Federal Court. In ADI 4277 and ADPF 132, the court ruled that same-sex couples must be allowed to legally register their relationships. The decision was approved 10–0; one judge abstained because he had previously spoken publicly in favor of same-sex unions when he was attorney general. The ruling resulted in stable unions for same-sex couples having the same financial and legal rights enjoyed by those in opposite-sex relationships. Stable unions of same-sex couples are guaranteed similar rights as marriages, including adoption, welfare benefits, pension, inheritance tax, income tax, social security, health benefits, immigration, joint property ownership, hospital and prison visitation, in vitro fertilisation and surrogacy.

On 6 December 2011, Judge James Magalhães de Medeiros of the General Judicial Inspectorate (Corregedoria Geral da Justiça)—a supervisory body within the state court system responsible for overseeing the proper functioning of the judiciary's administrative and auxiliary services, particularly in first-instance courts (i.e. trial courts) and registry services (such as marriages and births)—instructed the state's civil registry offices to process marriage applications from same-sex couples in an identical manner to opposite-sex couples. The decision, known as "Provision N° 40", came into effect upon publication the following day, making Alagoas the first state to open marriage to same-sex couples. The first same-sex marriage in Alagoas occurred on 17 January 2012 for a couple who had been together for almost 25 years. Previously, a lesbian couple had been able to have their stable union converted into a marriage by a judge in Maceió in July 2011.

== Marriage statistics ==
According to the Brazilian Institute of Geography and Statistics, 839 same-sex marriages had taken place in Alagoas between 2013 and 2024.

Number of marriages performed in Alagoas
Year	Same-sex marriages			Opposite-sex marriages	Total marriages	% same-sex
Year	Female	Male	Total	Opposite-sex marriages	Total marriages	% same-sex
2013	14	3	17	16,032	16,049	0.11%
2014	15	3	18	17,532	17,550	0.10%
2015	29	19	48	18,001	18,049	0.27%
2016	20	12	32	15,757	15,789	0.20%
2017	34	10	44	14,703	14,747	0.30%
2018	56	39	95	15,001	15,096	0.63%
2019	53	25	88	15,096	15,184	0.58%
2020	48	28	76	10,577	10,633	0.71%
2021	94	45	139	13,755	13,894	1.0%
2022	56	27	83	12,963	13,046	0.64%
2023	56	25	81	14,160	14,241	0.57%
2024	75	43	118	13,582	13,700	0.86%

== Religious performance ==
Most major religious organisations in Alagoas do not perform or bless same-sex marriages in their places of worship. Religious denominations permitting same-sex marriage include the Anglican Episcopal Church of Brazil, and Umbanda and Candomblé groups.

== See also ==
- LGBTQ rights in Alagoas
- Same-sex marriage in Brazil
