= SSLT =

SSLT may refer to:

- Alegrete Airport
- Subsurface light transport
