= Maria Berenice Dias =

Brazilian judge (born 1948)

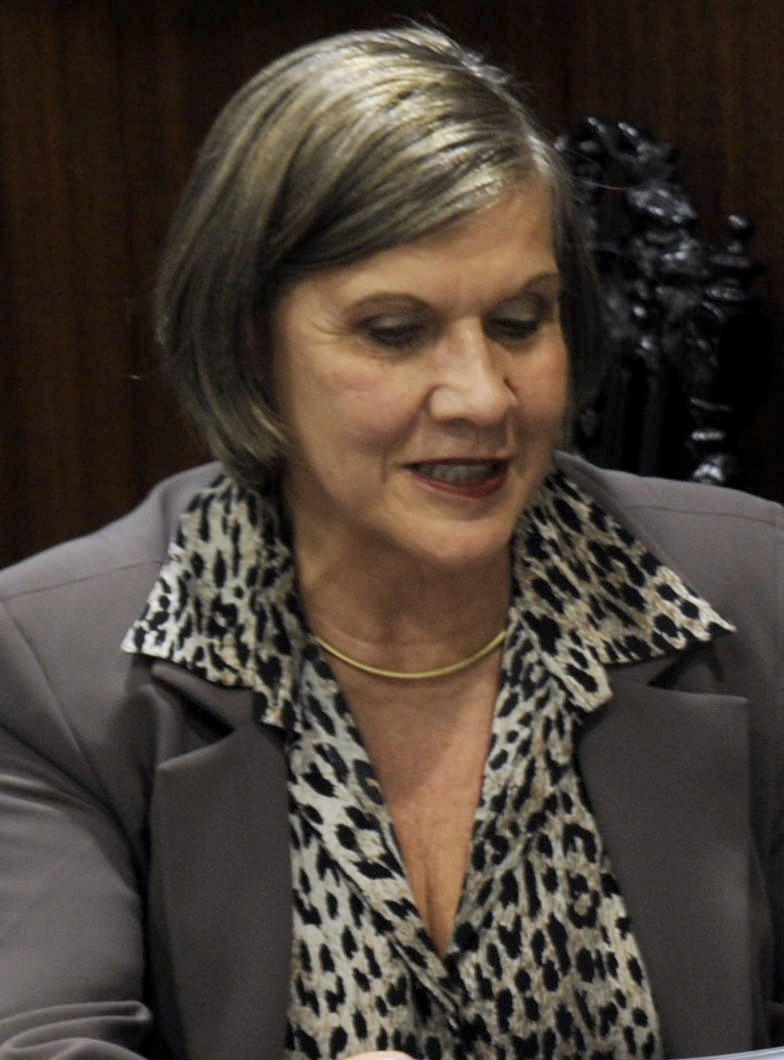
- Brazilian judge

Justice of the state highest Court of Appeals

Personal details
- Born: 1948 (age 76–77) Santiago, Rio Grande do Sul, Brazil

Maria Berenice Dias (born 1948 in the city of Santiago, state of Rio Grande do Sul, Brazil) is a Brazilian judge and the first woman to take the bench in her home state of Rio Grande do Sul. Dias obtained her Post Graduate Degree and Master in Civil Proceeding from the Pontifical Catholic University of Rio Grande do Sul.

Dr. Dias also was the first woman to become a justice of the state highest Court of Appeals. She is the presiding justice over the Seventh Panel of Judges of the state highest Court of Appeals; the quorum of judges assembles in Porto Alegre, the state capital. Dr. Dias' own specialty is the area of family law. She was selected and she accepted the title of ambassador of the First World Outgames in 2006 in Montreal, Quebec, Canada.

== Authorship ==
Dias is also an author, and has created, co-founded or presided over such organizations as the Brazilian Institute of Family Law (Instituto Brasileiro de Direito de Família/IBDFAM); the Federation of Women’s Associations (Federação das Associações Femeninas/FAF); JusMulher, offering voluntary legal and psychological service to women in need; and the Brazilian Association of Women with Careers in the Justice Field (Associação Brasileira das Mulheres de Carreira Jurídica/ABMCJ-RS).

One of her most notable publications is Homoafetividade - o que diz a Justiça, a work in which she gathers and comments on judicial decisions by the Brazilian Court of Appeals regarding civil rights of same-sex couples and the destigmatization of homoaffective relationships. These decisions set legal precedents in Brazil.
