= Same-sex marriage in Santa Catarina =

Same-sex marriage has been legal in Santa Catarina since April 29, 2013. Santa Catarina was one of the thirteen states of Brazil to have opened marriage to same-sex couples before its nationwide legalisation in May 2013. Civil unions have also been available to same-sex couples since May 2011 in accordance with a ruling from the Supreme Federal Court.

== Legal history ==
Stable unions (Portuguese: união estável, Brazilian Portuguese: [uniˈɐ̃w̃ isˈtavew]; Hunsrik: Leewespartnerxaft, pronounced [ˈleːvəsˌpʰaːtnɐʃaft]; Talian: union stàbile, pronounced [uˈnjoŋ ˈstabile]) have been legally performed and recognized nationwide, including in Santa Catarina, since May 2011 in accordance with a ruling from the Supreme Federal Court. In ADI 4277 and ADPF 132, the court ruled that same-sex couples must be allowed to legally register their relationships. The decision was approved 10–0; one judge abstained because he had previously spoken publicly in favor of same-sex unions when he was attorney general. The ruling resulted in stable unions for same-sex couples having the same financial and legal rights enjoyed by those in opposite-sex relationships. Stable unions of same-sex couples are guaranteed similar rights as marriages, including adoption, welfare benefits, pension, inheritance tax, income tax, social security, health benefits, immigration, joint property ownership, hospital and prison visitation, in vitro fertilisation and surrogacy. The first stable union in Santa Catarina occurred in Itajaí on 15 July 2011.

On April 29, 2013, Judge Vanderlei Romer of the General Judicial Inspectorate (Corregedoria Geral da Justiça)—a supervisory body within the state court system responsible for overseeing the proper functioning of the judiciary's administrative and auxiliary services, particularly in first-instance courts (i.e. trial courts) and registry services (such as marriages and births)—instructed the state's civil registry offices to process marriage applications from same-sex couples in an identical manner to opposite-sex couples, and allow conversions of stable unions into marriages. The decision legalized same-sex marriage in Santa Catarina.

In August 2013, a prosecutor in Florianópolis, Henrique Limongi, attracted significant media attention after publicly stating that he would refuse to issue marriage licenses to same-sex couples, in defiance of both state and federal law. Under Brazilian law, judges and notaries are prohibited from denying same-sex couples the right to marry. Limongi falsely claimed that recognizing same-sex marriages was "unconstitutional". Between 2013 and 2018, he personally sought to annul 112 same-sex marriages. Lawyers representing some of the affected couples labelled his arguments "baseless", noting that the National Justice Council has held that same-sex marriage does not violate the Constitution of Brazil; on the contrary, it requires its recognition. Official investigations alleging "public misconduct", "disrespect for legal hierarchy" and "placing personal beliefs above the law" were launched by the Public Ministry National Council (CNMP; Conselho Nacional do Ministério Público) and the Brazilian Bar Association (Ordem dos Advogados do Brasil). In July 2020, the CNMP declined to bring disciplinary charges but recommend his removal from office. The following month, the Public Ministry of Santa Catarina removed Limongi from his role as a marriage officer and reassigned him, effective from 1 September. His successor, Vânia Sangalli, affirmed she would perform same-sex marriages. In September 2020, the Santa Catarina Court of Justice ruled that 46 same-sex marriages Limongi had officially challenged in 2019 were legal.

== Marriage statistics ==
According to the Brazilian Institute of Geography and Statistics, 4,647 same-sex marriages were performed in Santa Catarina between 2013 and 2024. Figures for 2020 are lower than previous years because of the restrictions in place due to the COVID-19 pandemic.

Number of marriages performed in Santa Catarina
Year	Same-sex marriages			Opposite-sex marriages	Total marriages	% same-sex
Year	Female	Male	Total	Opposite-sex marriages	Total marriages	% same-sex
2013	81	126	207	30,944	31,151	0.66%
2014	137	205	342	31,738	32,080	1.1%
2015	139	210	349	32,471	32,820	1.1%
2016	137	245	382	32,307	32,689	1.2%
2017	135	215	350	33,398	33,748	1.0%
2018	200	229	429	32,386	32,815	1.3%
2019	195	180	375	32,785	33,160	1.1%
2020	145	110	255	23,943	24,198	1.1%
2021	224	180	404	31,631	32,035	1.3%
2022	308	216	524	35,097	35,621	1.5%
2023	303	220	523	35,135	35,658	1.5%
2024	299	208	507	35,604	36,111	1.4%

== Religious performance ==
Most major religious organisations in Santa Catarina do not perform or bless same-sex marriages in their places of worship. Religious denominations permitting same-sex marriage include the Anglican Episcopal Church of Brazil, and Umbanda and Candomblé groups.

== See also ==
- LGBTQ rights in Santa Catarina
- Same-sex marriage in Brazil
