= Estrela Velha =

Municipality of Rio Grande do Sul, Brazil

- Municipality
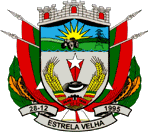
- Flag Coat of arms

- Location within Rio Grande do Sul

- Location in Brazil
- Coordinates: 29°10′37″S 53°9′32″W
- Country: Brazil
- State: Rio Grande do Sul

Population (2020)
  - Total: 3,650
- Time zone: UTC−3 (BRT)

Estrela Velha is a municipality in the state of Rio Grande do Sul, Brazil. It was raised to municipality status in 1995, the area being taken out of the municipality of Arroio do Tigre.

The municipality is partly flooded by the reservoir of the Dona Francisca Hydroelectric Plant on the upper Jacuí River.

== See also ==
- List of municipalities in Rio Grande do Sul
