= Itacurubi =

Municipality of Rio Grande do Sul, Brazil

- Municipality
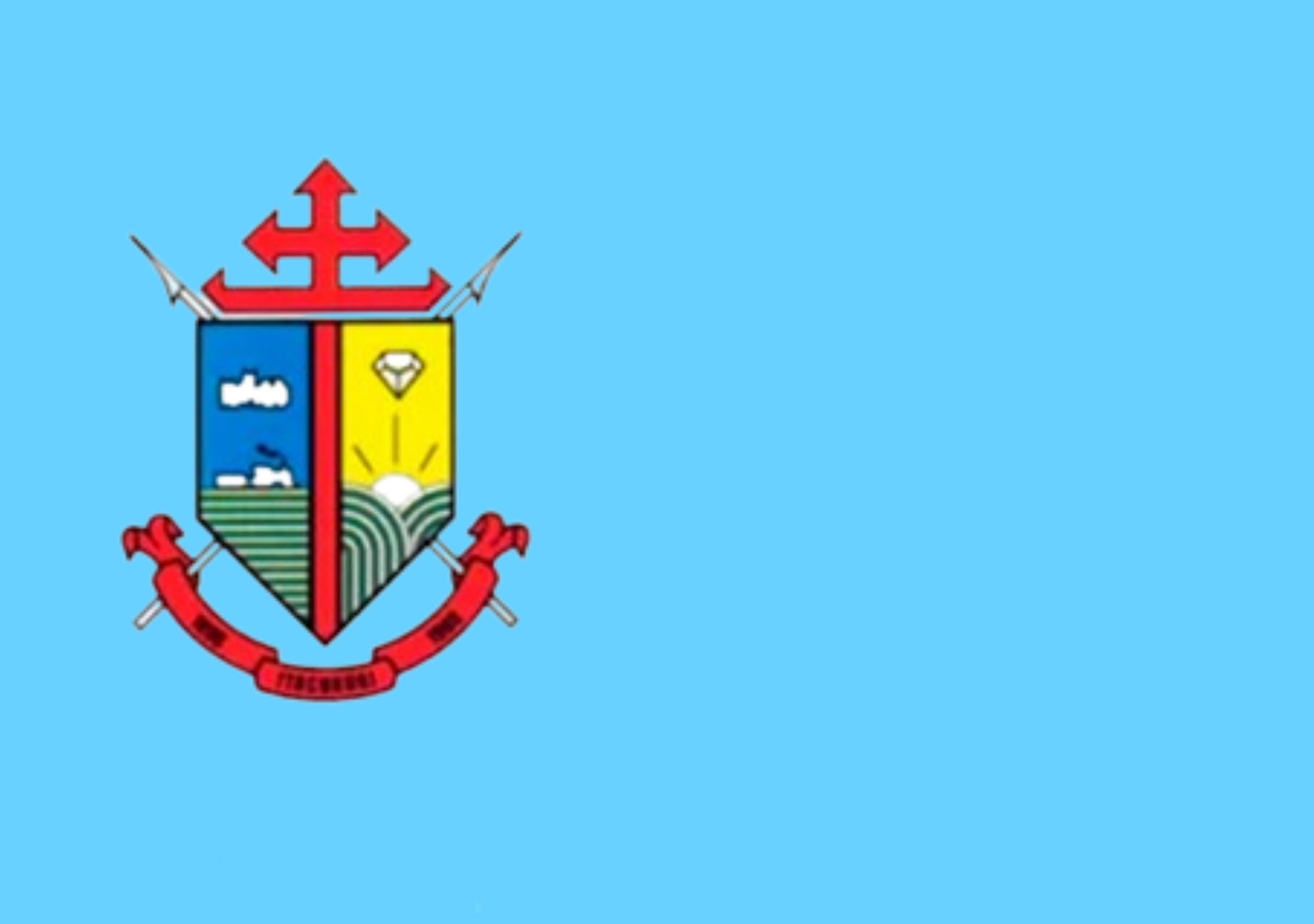
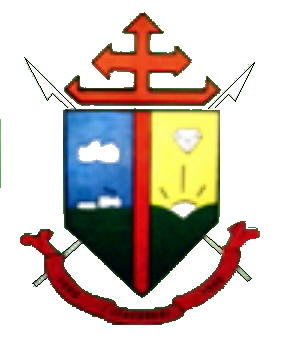
- Flag Coat of arms

- Location in Rio Grande do Sul state

- Location in Brazil
- Coordinates: 28°47′43″S 55°14′7″W
- Country: Brazil
- Region: South
- State: Rio Grande do Sul
- Mesoregion: Centro Ocidental Rio-Grandense
- Microregion: Santiago

Area
  - Total: 1,120.87 km^{2} (432.77 sq mi)
- Elevation: 169 m (554 ft)

Population (2022)
  - Total: 2,995
  - Density: 2.672/km^{2} (6.921/sq mi)
- Time zone: UTC−3 (BRT)
- Postal code: 97685-xxx
- Website: www.itacurubi.rs.gov.br

Itacurubi is a municipality of the western part of the state of Rio Grande do Sul, Brazil. The population is 2,995 (2022 census) in an area of 1,120.87 km^{2}. Its elevation is 169 m. The name comes from the Tupi language. It is located 627 km west of the state capital of Porto Alegre, northeast of Alegrete.

== See also ==
- List of municipalities in Rio Grande do Sul
