= Rcl 12876 and MS 32077 =

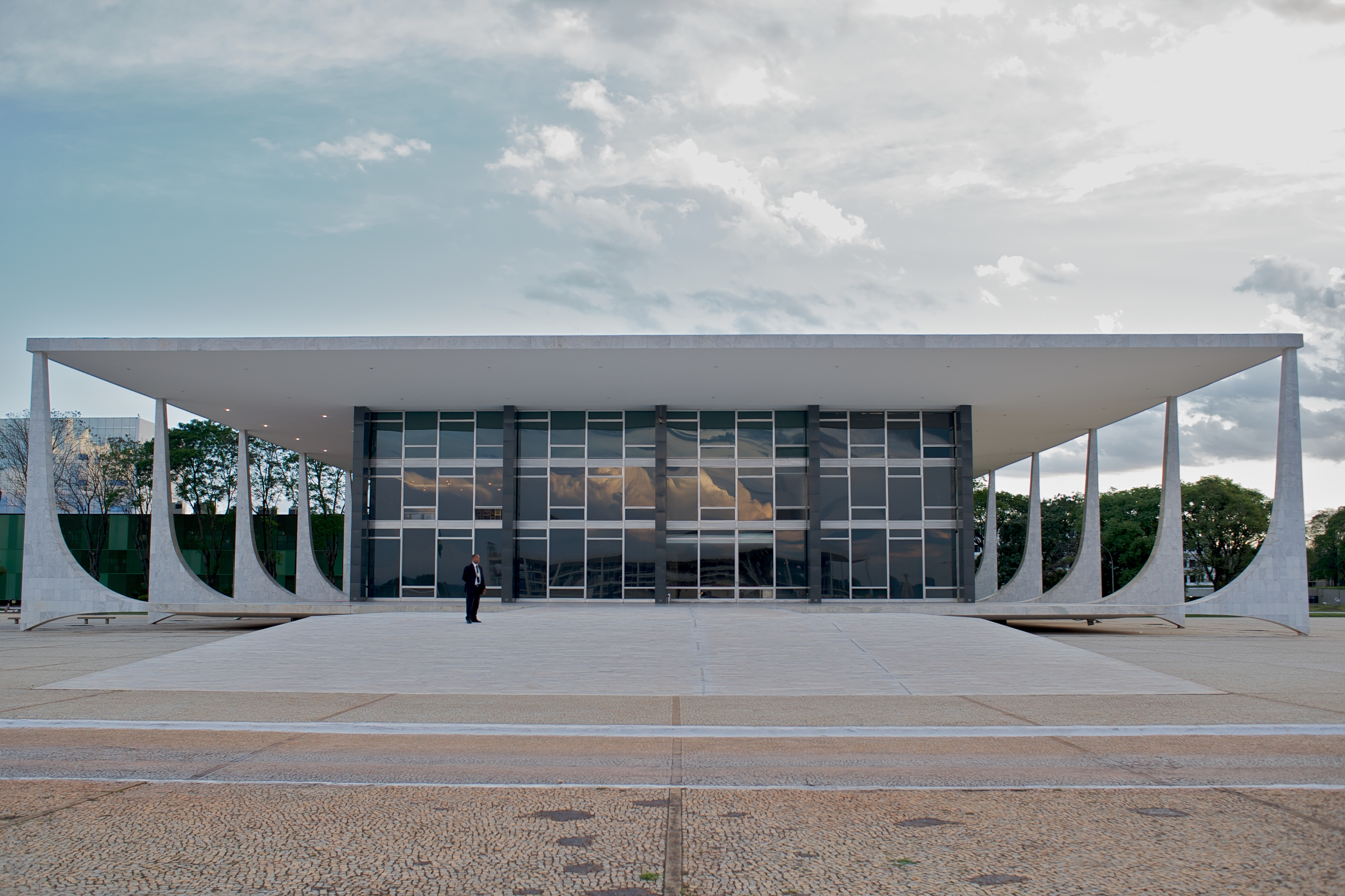
- Court: Supreme Court of Brazil
- Full case name: Rcl 12876 (CARLOS ALBERTO TUFVESSON and ANDRE PIVA v. JUIZ DE DIREITO DA VARA DE REGISTROS PÚBLICOS DA COMARCA DO RIO DE JANEIRO) and MS 32077 (PARTIDO SOCIAL CRISTÃO - PSC v. PRESIDENTE DO CONSELHO NACIONAL DE JUSTIÇA)
- Decided: Pending
- Citation: MS 32077Rcl 12876

Court membership
- Judges sitting: Chief Justice Joaquim Barbosa Rapporteur Justice Luiz Fux Associate Justices Carmen Lúcia Antunes Rocha, Dias Toffoli, Enrique Ricardo Lewandowski, Gilmar Ferreira Mendes, Joaquim Barbosa, José Celso de Mello, Marco Aurélio Mello, Rosa Weber, Teori Zavascki

Rcl 12876 and MS 32077 (the first is pending, the second was decided), are landmark Brazil Supreme Court cases.

== Pending Actions ==
Rcl 12876

Carlos Alberto Tufvesson and Andre Piva, a gay couple from Rio de Janeiro, entered on November 4, 2011, with action on Supreme Court of Brazil to legalize same-sex marriage in the country.

== Judicial Decisions ==
=== MS 32077 ===
Supreme Federal Court

- Action

Social Christian Party (PSC), "Partido Social Cristão (PSC)", entered on May 21, 2013, with action on Supreme Court of Brazil contesting the approval of same-sex marriage by National Council of Justice (CNJ), "Conselho Nacional de Justiça (CNJ)", and not by Supreme Court of the country.

- Decision

The minister Luiz Fux decided that the decision of the National Justice Council to legalize same-sex marriage was correct. With this, continues same-sex marriage valid in the country.

National Justice Council

On May 14, 2013, the Justice's National Council of Brazil legalized same-sex marriage in the entire country in a 14-1 vote by issuing a ruling that orders all civil registers of the country to perform same-sex marriages and convert any existing civil unions into marriages if such a couple desires. Joaquim Barbosa, president of the Council of Justice and the Supreme Federal Court said in the decision that notaries cannot continue to refuse to "perform a civil wedding or the conversion of a stable civil union into a marriage between persons of the same-sex." The ruling was published on May 15 and took effect on May 16, 2013.

Superior Court of Justice

On October 25, 2011, the Superior Court of Justice declared that the legal union of two women who petitioned the court could be recognized as a marriage. The decision of the Superior Court will only reach the authors of the demand, different of the Supreme Court with "stare decisis", but a precedent for other couples do the same request.

Courts of States

Supreme Court legalized civil union on May 5, 2011. The Brazilian Law allows the conversion of civil union into a full marriage. Between 2011 and 2013, the Courts of 13 Brazilian States legalized same-sex marriage based on that. And finally, on May 14, 2013, the decision of National Justice Council legalized same-sex marriage nationwide.

== High Court decision ==
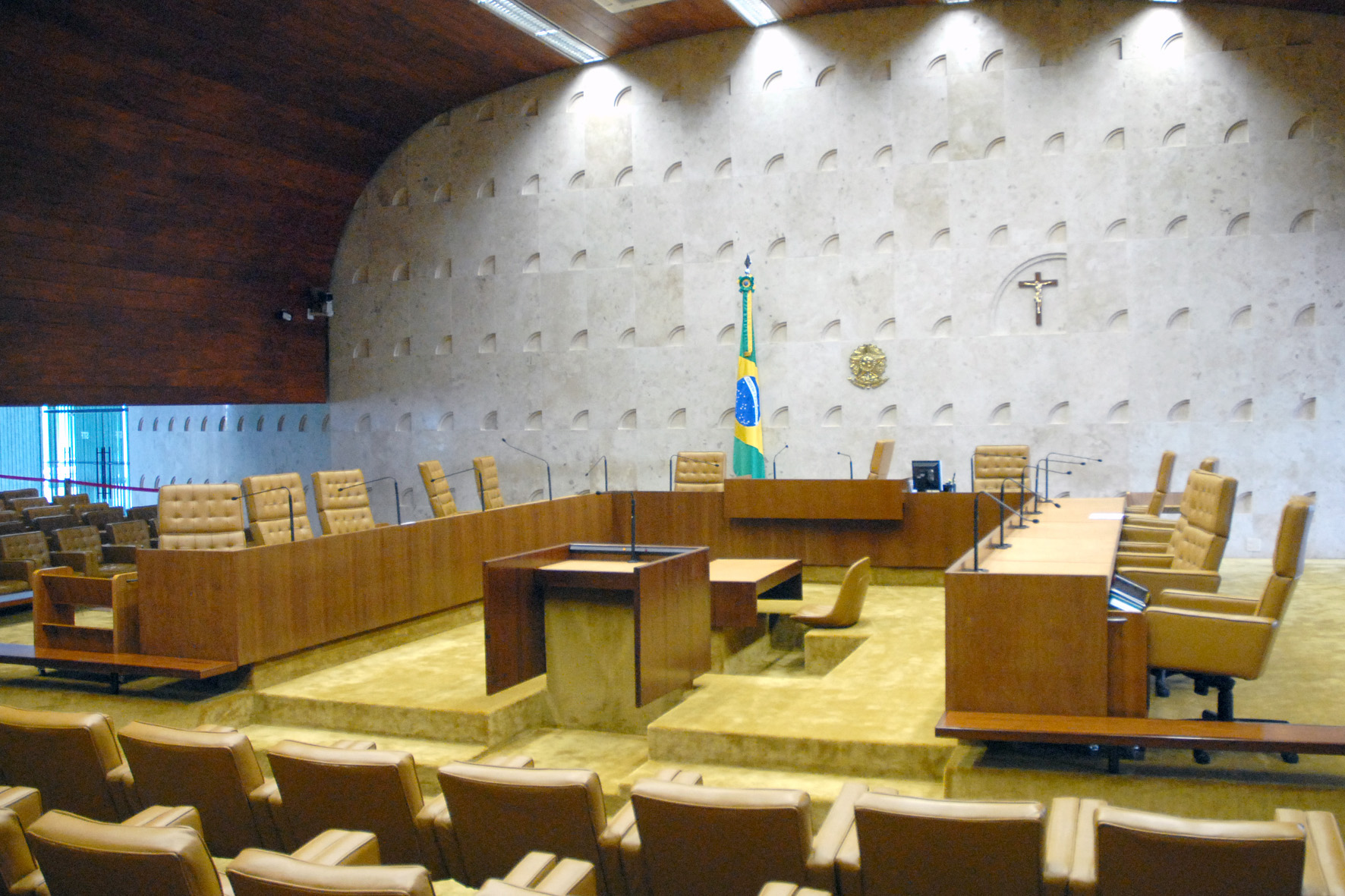
Supreme Court of Brazil.

=== Judiciary representation ===
Supreme Court members	Ministers	Yes	No
Dias Toffoli	1		
Carmen Lúcia Antunes Rocha	1		
Gilmar Ferreira Mendes	1		
José Celso de Mello	1		
Marco Aurélio Mello	1		
Rosa Weber	1		
Joaquim Benedito Barbosa Gomes	1		
Enrique Ricardo Lewandowski	1		
Luiz Fux	1		
Teori Zavascki	1		
Total	10		

=== Legislative representation ===
Attorney General of Brazil	Prosecutor	Yes	No
Roberto Gurgel	1		
Total	1		

=== Executive representation ===
Solicitor-General of Brazil	Solicitor General	Yes	No
Luís Inácio Adams	1		
Total	1		

== See also ==
- Same-sex marriage in Brazil
- LGBT rights in Brazil
