= Microregion of Santiago =

Coordinates: 29°11′31″S 54°52′01″W

Santiago
- Micro-region
- Country: Brazil
- State: Rio Grande do Sul
- Mesoregion: Centro Ocidental Rio-Grandense
- Municipalities: 9

Area
  - Total: 11,214 km^{2} (4,330 sq mi)

The Santiago microregion (Brazilian Portuguese: Microrregião de Santiago) is a microregion in the western part of the state of Rio Grande do Sul, Brazil. Its total area is 11,213.844 km².

== Municipalities ==
The microregion consists of the following municipalities:

- Capão do Cipó
- Itacurubi
- Jari
- Júlio de Castilhos
- Pinhal Grande
- Quevedos
- Santiago
- Tupanciretã
- Unistalda
