= Ibarama =

Municipality of Rio Grande do Sul, Brazil

- Municipality
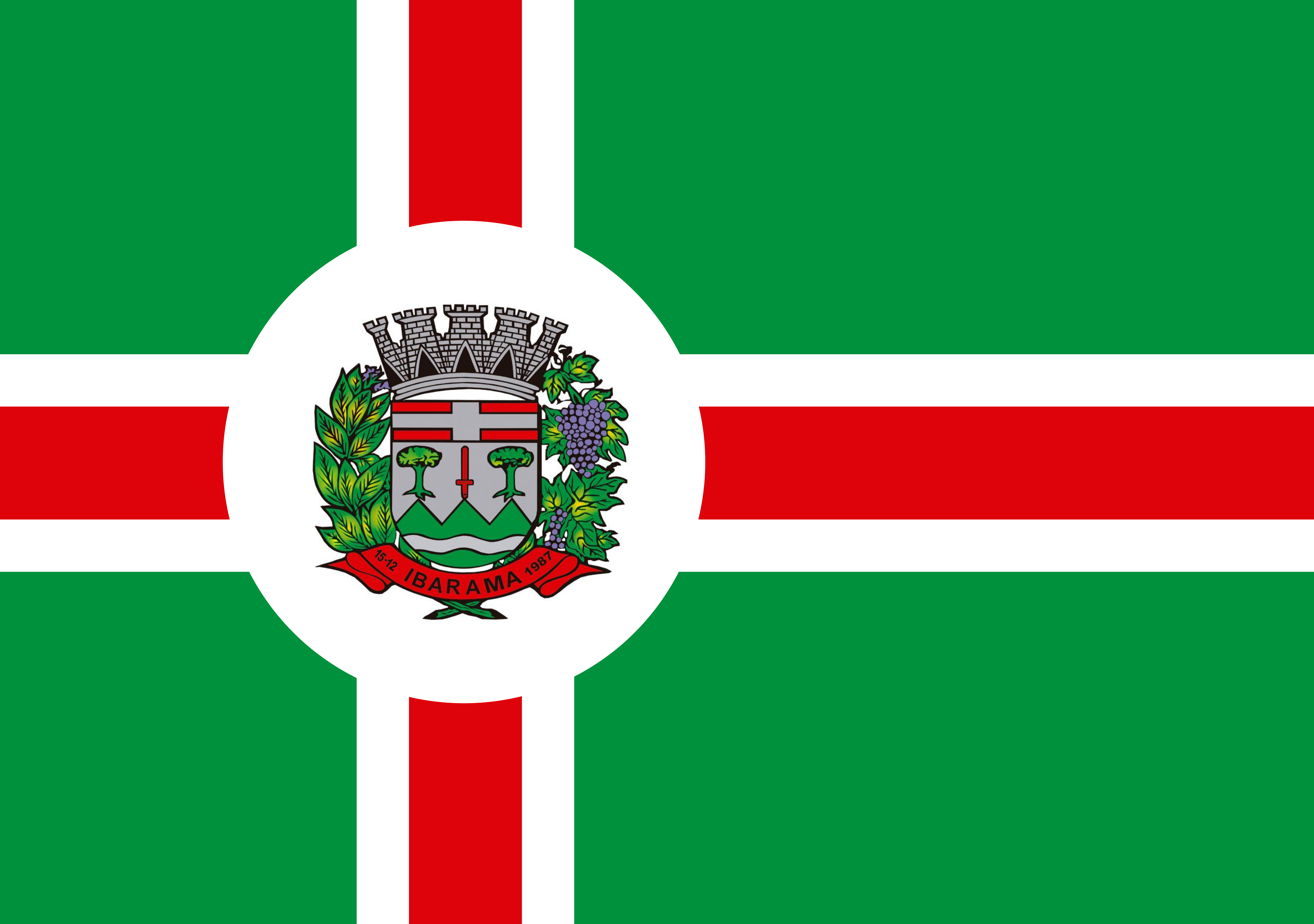
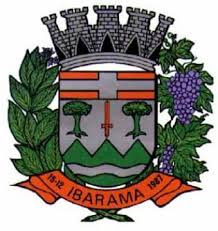
- Flag Coat of arms

- Location within Rio Grande do Sul

- Location in Brazil
- Coordinates: 29°25′S 53°08′W
- Country: Brazil
- State: Rio Grande do Sul

Population (2020)
  - Total: 4,399
- Time zone: UTC−3 (BRT)

Ibarama is a municipality in the state of Rio Grande do Sul, Brazil.

The municipality contains part of the 1,848 hectares (4,570 acres) Quarta Colônia State Park, created in 2005. The municipality is partly flooded by the reservoir of the Dona Francisca Hydroelectric Plant on the upper Jacuí River.

== See also ==
- List of municipalities in Rio Grande do Sul
