= Agudo, Rio Grande do Sul =

Municipality of Rio Grande do Sul, Brazil

Agudo
- Municipality
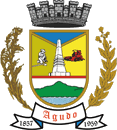
- Flag Coat of arms

- Location within Rio Grande do Sul

- Location in Brazil
- Coordinates: 29°38′43″S 53°14′24″W
- Country: Brazil
- State: Rio Grande do Sul

Area
  - Total: 553.1 km^{2} (213.6 sq mi)
- Elevation: 83 m (272 ft)

Population (2022)
  - Total: 16,041
  - Density: 29.00/km^{2} (75.11/sq mi)
- Time zone: UTC−3 (BRT)

Agudo (Portuguese: [aˈɡu.du], lit. 'acute') is a municipality in Rio Grande do Sul, the southernmost state of Brazil.

== Geography ==
Agudo is 83 meters above sea level. The total area is 553,1 km^{2} and the population was estimated at 16,041 in 2022.

The municipality contains part of the 1,848 hectares (4,570 acres) Quarta Colônia State Park, created in 2005. The municipality contains part of the hydroelectric Dona Francisca Dam on the upper Jacuí River.

== History ==
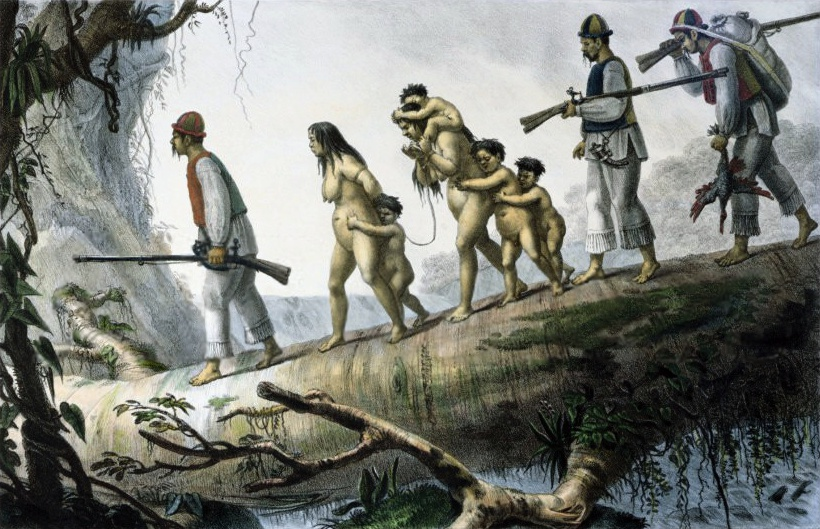
A Guarani family captured by Indian slave hunters. A drawing by the French travelling artist Jean Baptiste Debret

Archeological evidence indicates that this area was settled by humankind as far back as 8,000 years ago. The first Europeans to come into the area were Jesuit priests who in the 16th century began establishing the so-called Reductions or Missions as they also were named in the wider region (i.e. Brazil, Argentina and Paraguay). At a later date with the expulsion of the Jesuit order by both the Spanish and Portuguese crowns from South America left the area inactive as far as European activities were concerned.

The local indigenous population suffered attacks by Paulistas from the north who, amongst other things, made it their business to capture Indians to be put up for sale in the slave markets of São Paulo, etc. In 1857, a new wave of immigration started to affect the region, this time attracting Germanic settlers and subsequently peoples of other European origins. The German language is still spoken by some residents of the Municipality of Agudo and in areas around it. In 2001, a fossil of a dinosaur was found in Agudos and after the analysis of its skeleton, it was reported to be a new species of ornithischian dinosaur, named sacisaur (Sacisaurus agudoensis) after the evidence that the skeleton missed the bones of one of its leg.

== See also ==
- List of municipalities in Rio Grande do Sul
