= Quarta Colônia State Park =

State park in Rio Grande do Sul, Brazil

- Parque Estadual Quarta Colônia
- IUCN category II (national park)
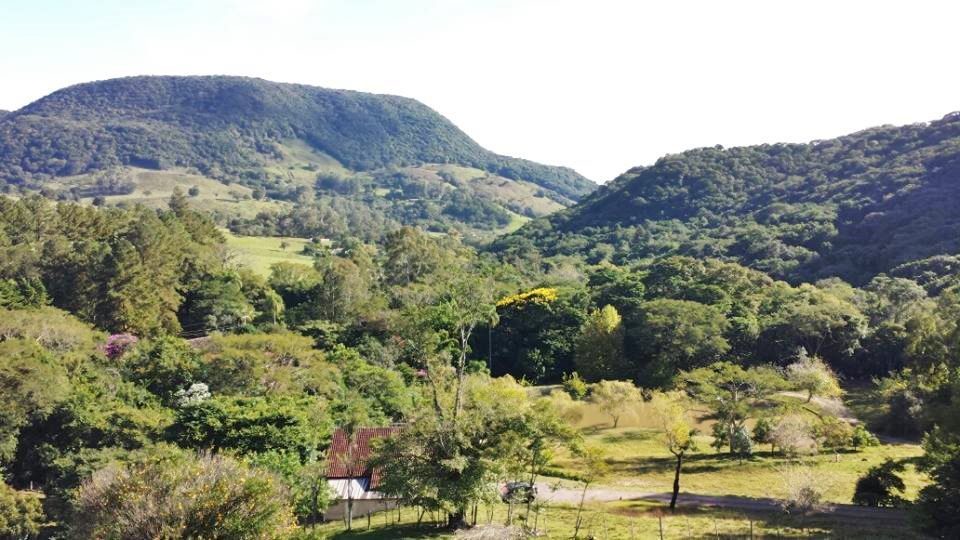
- View of the park

- Location within Brazil
- Nearest city: Agudo, Rio Grande do Sul
- Coordinates: 29°26′19″S 53°15′54″W
- Area: 1,847.9 ha (7.135 sq mi)
- Designation: State park
- Created: 19 December 2005
- Administrator: Secretaria do Ambiente e Desenvolvimento Sustentável

The Quarta Colônia State Park Portuguese: Parque Estadual Quarta Colônia is a state park in the state of Rio Grande do Sul, Brazil. It protects an area of seasonal deciduous forest beside the dam of a hydroelectric power plant that started operation in 2001 on the Jacuí River. As of 2016 there was no management plan and the park had not been opened for visitors.

== Location ==
The Quarta Colônia State Park is in the municipalities of Agudo and Ibarama, Rio Grande do Sul, on the left bank of the reservoir of the Dona Francisca dam on the Jacuí River. It has an area of 1,847.9 hectares (4,566 acres). It protects remnants of seasonal deciduous forest in the Atlantic Forest biome.

== History ==
The Quarta Colônia State Park was created by governor Germano Antônio Rigotto by state decree 44.186 of 19 December 2005. The park was created as environmental compensation for the Dona Francisca Hydroelectric Plant on the Jacuí River. The main objective is to protect the forest remnants and species listed as endangered in Brazil such as red-spectacled amazon (Amazona pretrei), lowland paca (Cuniculus paca), brocket deer (Mazama species), Geoffroy's cat (Leopardus geoffroyi) and oncilla (Leopardus tigrinus). As of 2016 land ownership had not been regularized, there was no management plan and no facilities for visiting the park.

== Environment ==
The park includes hills, cliffs and gentle or steep slopes. Altitudes range from almost 100 metres (330 ft) to over 400 metres (1,300 ft). The Köppen climate classification is Cfa (subtropical) with average annual precipitation of about 1,800 millimetres (71 in) and average temperature from 18 to 20 °C (64 to 68 °F). The forest has been affected by human activity, including clearings and selective extraction, and is in different stages of regeneration.

== Sources ==
- Callegaro, Rafael M.; Araújo, Maristela M.; Longhi, Solon J. (2014), "Fitossociologia de agrupamentos em Floresta Estacional Decidual no Parque Estadual Quarta Colônia, Agudo-RS", Agrária - Revista Brasileira de Ciências Agrárias, 9 (4), Recife, PE: UFRPE., ISSN 1981-0997
- Parque Estadual Quarta Colônia (in Portuguese), SEMA: Secretaria do Ambiente e Desenvolvimento Sustentável
- Rigotto, Germano Antônio (19 December 2005), Decreto nº 44.186, de 19 de dezembro de 2005 (PDF) (in Portuguese)
