= Franklin Gomes Souto =

Brazilian lawyer, politician and abolitionist

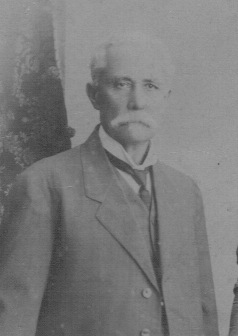
Franklin Gomes Souto, c. 1910

Franklin Gomes Souto (March 31, 1844 - September 26, 1917) was a Brazilian lawyer, politician and abolitionist from Alegrete, State of Rio Grande do Sul.

Souto earned a degree from the Law School of São Paulo in 1865. Back to his hometown of Alegrete, he represented, pro bono, dozens of slaves pleading for freedom in Brazilian courts. He was one of the first abolitionists to successfully claim that, under the Brazilian Slave Traffic Prohibition Law of 1831, all slaves travelling to Uruguay were immediately free upon their return to Brazil. After the proclamation of the Brazilian Republic in 1889, Souto was elected City Councillor of Alegrete.
