= Dona Francisca Hydroelectric Plant =

- Location in Brazil
- Official name: Usina Hidrelétrica Dona Francisca
- Country: Brazil
- Location: Agudo and Nova Palma, Rio Grande do Sul
- Coordinates: 29.447853°S 53.284684°W
- Purpose: Hydroelectricity
- Status: Operational
- Opening date: 2001

Reservoir
- Surface area: 2,098 hectares (5,180 acres)
- Normal elevation: 57 metres (187 ft)

Power Station
- Hydraulic head: 40 metres (130 ft)
- Turbines: 2 Francis
- Installed capacity: 125 MW (80 MW guaranteed)
- Annual generation: 679 GWh

The Dona Francisca Hydroelectric Plant (Portuguese: Usina Hidrelétrica Dona Francisca) is a hydroelectric plant on the Jacuí River in the state of Rio Grande do Sul, Brazil, completed in 2001. It delivers 80 MW guaranteed power.

== History ==
The Dona Francisca Dam impounds the upper Jacuí River, and is divided between the municipalities of Agudo and Nova Palma, Rio Grande do Sul. The environmental study was undertaken by Engevix. The installation license was granted by FEPAM/RS on 1 July 1998. The initial concession of 35 years was granted on 28 August 1998. Construction began in August 1998. The operational license was granted on 30 November 2000.

The plant entered operation in 2001. The second generation unit came into operation on 12 April 2001. The plant was officially inaugurated on 21 May 2001 in a ceremony attended by Vice President Marco Maciel and governor of Rio Grande do Sul, Olívio Dutra. The State Electric Power Company (CEEE) and Dona Francisca Energética SA (Dfesa) received a 35-year concession to exploit the plant's power potential.

== Technical ==
The reservoir has an area of 2,098 hectares (5,180 acres). The dam is a 51 metres (167 ft) high rolled compacted concrete structure. The powerhouse contains two Francis turbines. Water is delivered to the turbines from two penstocks, each 85 metres (279 ft) long and 6.3 metres (21 ft) in diameter. The total head is about 40 metres (130 ft). Installed capacity is 125 MW, with 80 MW guaranteed. Annual production is 679 GWh.

== Financial ==
As of May 2001 investment was R$205 million. The total cost was US$130 million. The responsible companies were Gerdau (48%), Celesc (Santa Catarina Electric Power Plants: 20%), CEEE (10%) and Desenvix (2%). From 23 August 2010 the concession was divided between CEEE (10%) and Dona Francisca Energética (90%). Dona Francisca Energética is owned by Statkraft (2.12%) (Note: 2.1% is owned by Statkraft Energias Renováveis, which in turn is 81.3% owned by Statkraft.), Copel (23.03%), Celesc (23.03%) and Gerdau (51.82%).

== Impact ==
The reservoir floods parts of the municipalities of Agudo, Ibarama, Arroio do Tigre, Pinhal Grande, Nova Palma and Estrela Velha, all in Rio Grande do Sul. It affected 518 rural properties, and 540 families with a total of 2,709 people were required to move. The Quarta Colônia State Park is on the left bank of the reservoir of the Dona Francisca dam, with an area of 1,847.9 hectares (4,566 acres). The park was created in 2005 as environmental compensation for the hydroelectric plant.

== Sources ==
- Dona Francisca (in Portuguese), OSAB: Observatório Sócio-Ambiental da Baragens, archived from the original on 2019-05-23
- Dona Francisca, Statkraft
- "Estado: Inaugurada Usina Hidrelétrica de Dona Francisca", Diario Popular (in Portuguese), 22 May 2001
- Parque Estadual Quarta Colônia (in Portuguese), SEMA: Secretaria do Ambiente e Desenvolvimento Sustentável
- UHE Dona Francisca (in Portuguese), Statkraft, archived from the original on 2017-02-02
