= Capão do Cipó =

Municipality in Rio Grande do Sul, Brazil

- Municipality
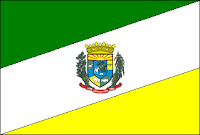
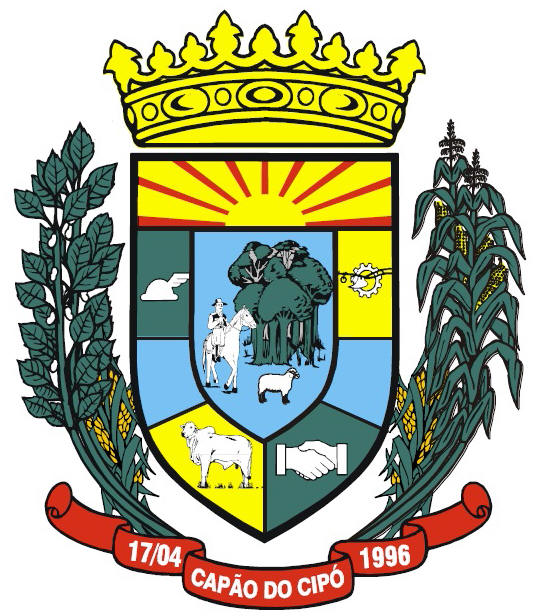
- Flag Coat of arms

- Location in Rio Grande do Sul state

- Location in Brazil
- Coordinates: 28°56′4″S 54°33′22″W
- Country: Brazil
- Region: South
- State: Rio Grande do Sul
- Mesoregion: Centro Ocidental Rio-Grandense
- Microregion: Santiago

Area
  - Total: 1,120.87 km^{2} (432.77 sq mi)

Population (2022)
  - Total: 3,119
  - Density: 2.783/km^{2} (7.207/sq mi)
- Time zone: UTC−3 (BRT)
- Postal code: 98870-xxx
- Website: www.capaodocipo.rs.gov.br

Capão do Cipó is a municipality of the western part of the state of Rio Grande do Sul, Brazil. The population is 3,699 (2020 est.) in an area of 1,120.87 km^{2}. The economy is mainly agricultural and it contains 500 square kilometres of soybean production.

== See also ==
- List of municipalities in Rio Grande do Sul
