= Arroio do Tigre =

Municipality of Rio Grande do Sul, Brazil

- Municipality
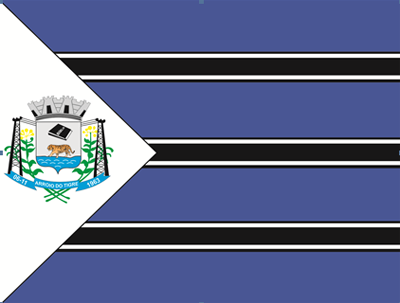
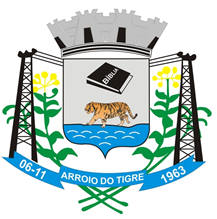
- Flag Coat of arms
- Nickname: Celeiro do centro-serra
- Coordinates: 29°19′58″S 53°05′34″W
- Country: Brazil
- State: Rio Grande do Sul
- Mesoregion: Centro Oriental Rio-grandense
- Microregion: Santa Cruz do Sul
- Founded: November 6, 1963

Government
  - Mayor: Gilberto Rathke

Area
  - Total: 318.524 km^{2} (122.983 sq mi)
- Elevation: 409 m (1,342 ft)

Population (2020)
  - Total: 13,413
  - Density: 42.110/km^{2} (109.06/sq mi)
- Time zone: UTC−3 (BRT)
- Postal code: 96950-000
- Area code: +55 51
- HDI: 0.764
- GDP: R$ 125,575,000
- GDP per capita: R$10,093.00
- Website: arroiodotigre.rs.gov.br

Arroio do Tigre is a municipality in the state of Rio Grande do Sul, Brazil.

The municipality is partly flooded by the reservoir of the Dona Francisca Hydroelectric Plant on the upper Jacuí River.

== History ==
The principal settlement of the region occurred around 1900, when German settlers migrated from the "Colônias Velhas" region (called die Altkolonie, in the regional German dialect Riograndenser Hunsrückisch) of Santa Cruz do Sul and the surrounding areas. Afterwards there was an influx of Italian Brazilians and Portuguese Brazilians. In 1920 it began to be known as Vila Tigre, and found its first commercial buildings, Catholic and Evangelical churches, and later, the Hospital Santa Rosa de Lima and Colégio Sagrado Coração de Jesus. In 1920 an agricultural cooperative, Cooperativa Agrícola Mista Linha Cereja (COMACEL), was founded, which is still active.

Until 1929 the region was part of the municipality of Soledade, then became the third district of Sobradinho. It became its own municipality on November 6, 1963, by the Law No. 605A.

== See also ==
- List of municipalities in Rio Grande do Sul
