= Santiago Airport (Brazil) =

Airport in Rio Grande do Sul, Brazil

Santiago Airport Aeroporto de Santiago
- IATA: none; ICAO: SSST; LID: RS0015

Summary
- Airport type: Public
- Serves: Santiago
- Time zone: Time in Brazil (UTC−03:00)
- Elevation AMSL: 441 m / 1,447 ft
- Coordinates: 29°12′54″S 054°50′30″W

Map
- Location in Brazil

Runways
Direction	Length		Surface
Direction	m	ft	Surface
17/35	830	2,723	Asphalt
- Source: ANAC DECEA

Santiago Airport (ICAO: SSST) is the airport serving Santiago, Brazil.

== Airlines and destinations ==
No scheduled flights operate at this airport.

== Access ==
The airport is located 2 km (1 mi) southeast from downtown Santiago.

== See also ==
- List of airports in Brazil
