= Same-sex marriage in Brazil =

Same-sex marriage has been legal in Brazil since 16 May 2013, following a decision by the National Justice Council ordering notaries of every state to license and perform same-sex marriages. On 14 May 2013, the National Justice Council legalized same-sex marriage nationwide, ruling 14–1 that notaries are obliged to license and perform same-sex marriages and convert civil unions into marriages if the couples so wish. President of the Supreme Federal Court Joaquim Barbosa stated that notaries could not continue to refuse to "license and perform a civil marriage or the conversion of a stable union into a marriage between two people of the same sex". The ruling was published on 15 May and took effect the following day. Before nationwide legalisation, the states of Alagoas, Bahia, Ceará, Espírito Santo, Mato Grosso, Mato Grosso do Sul, Paraíba, Paraná, Piauí, Rondônia, Santa Catarina, São Paulo, and Sergipe, as well as the Federal District and the city of Santa Rita do Sapucaí, had already legalized same-sex marriages. In Rio de Janeiro, same-sex couples could also marry but only if local judges approved their requests. Polling suggests that a majority of Brazilians support the legal recognition of same-sex marriage. Brazil was the second country in South America, after Argentina, and the twelfth in the world to legalize same-sex marriage.

Same-sex unions had already been legally recognized in Brazil in the form of stable unions, following a ruling by the Supreme Federal Court on 5 May 2011. These unions are granted most of the rights of marriage. The ruling was published on 12 May and took effect on 13 May 2011.

== Stable unions ==
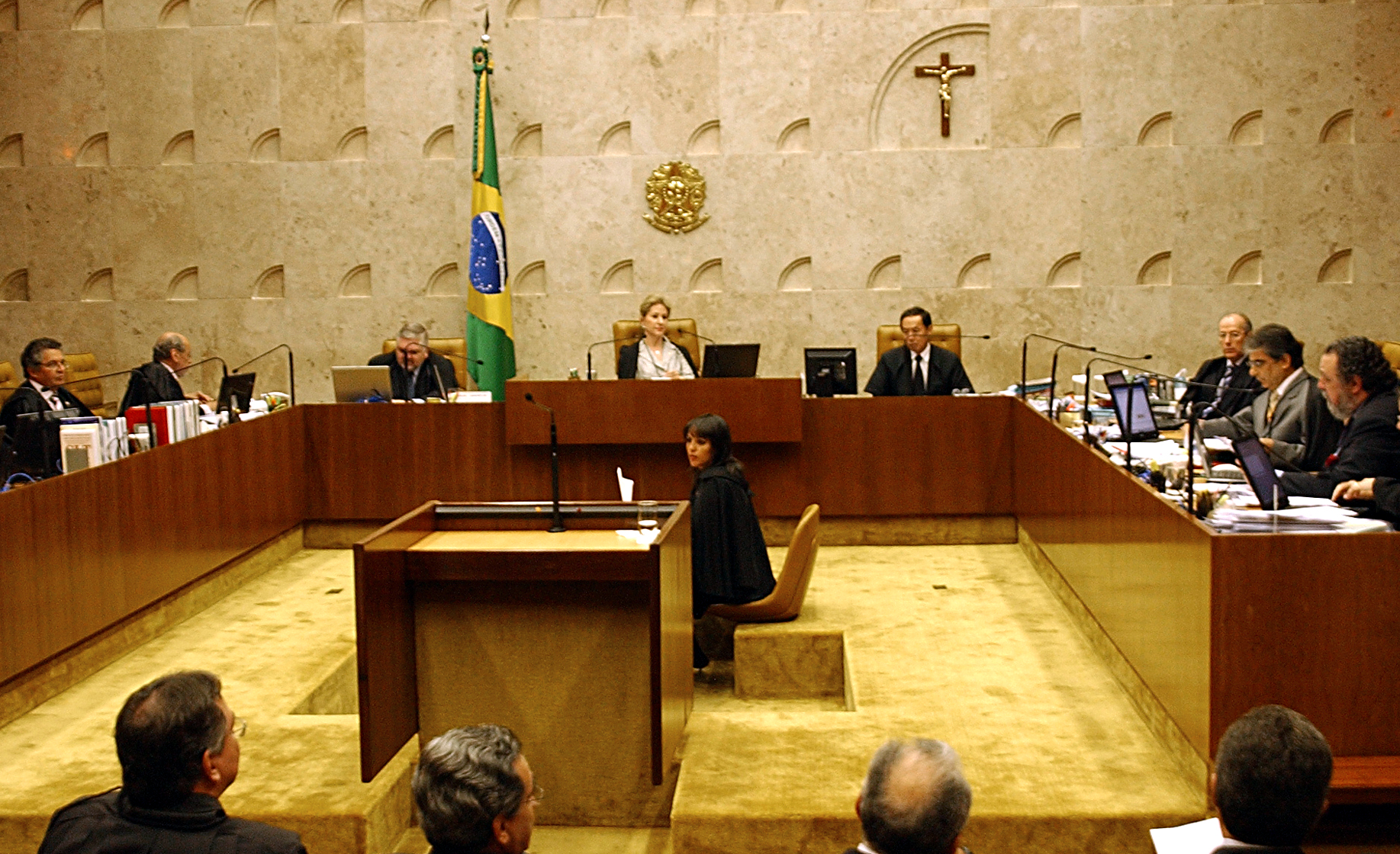
Interior of the Supreme Federal Court, which issued a ruling on 5 May 2011 recognizing same-sex stable unions nationwide

The first case of legal recognition of a same-sex union in Brazil occurred in 2004 for a dual Brazilian-English couple. The couple's relationship was recognized in the form of a common-law marriage—which at the time was only available to opposite-sex couples. The couple had lived together for fourteen years in the city of Curitiba.

In 2010, the Ministry of Foreign Affairs authorized Brazilian diplomats to request a diplomatic or service passport and stay visa for same-sex partners. The decision, which applies to both same-sex and opposite-sex partners, was communicated internally to embassies and consulates in over 200 countries. According to the Foreign Ministry, the measure requires employees to register their same-sex partners in order to secure their right to reside abroad. With the issuance of diplomatic passports, it is now easier for partners to obtain residence permits. Also in 2010, the state-owned Infraero (Brazilian Company of Airport Infrastructure) began recognizing stable unions between same-sex couples for the purpose of granting benefits. To be eligible for these benefits, the union must be registered with a public notary.

Stable unions (Portuguese: união estável, Brazilian Portuguese: [uniˈɐ̃w̃ isˈtavew]) (Note: Hunsrik: Leewespartnerxaft, pronounced [ˈleːvəsˌpʰaːtnɐʃaft]; Talian: union stàbile, pronounced [uˈnjoŋ ˈstabile]) have been recognized in Brazil since 13 May 2011, after the Supreme Federal Court had ruled in ADI 4277 and ADPF 132 on 5 May that same-sex couples must be allowed to legally register their relationships. The decision was approved 10–0; one judge abstained because he had previously spoken publicly in favor of same-sex unions when he was attorney general. The ruling resulted in stable unions for same-sex couples having the same financial and legal rights enjoyed by those in opposite-sex relationships. Stable unions of same-sex couples are guaranteed similar rights as marriages, including adoption, welfare benefits, pension, inheritance tax, income tax, social security, health benefits, immigration, joint property ownership, hospital and prison visitation, in vitro fertilisation and surrogacy. The ruling was issued in response to two lawsuits: one filed by the Rio de Janeiro State Government in 2008 and another filed in 2009 by the Public Prosecutor's Office. Same-sex couples can officially register their relationships as a stable union by providing evidence such as a shared bank account, cohabitation at the same address, or other indicators of a committed partnership. On 17 June 2011, a judge in Goiânia annulled the stable union of Liorcino Mendes and Odilio Torres, and ordered all notaries in Goiânia to stop issuing stable union licenses. The judge, who was also a church pastor of the Assembleias de Deus, argued that recognizing same-sex unions was "unconstitutional". On 21 June, another judge annulled his decision. Concerned, the couple registered another stable union in Rio de Janeiro.

On 7 June 2013, the Brazilian Air Force recognized the stable union of a sergeant and his partner after the sergeant presented a notarized deed documenting their relationship. The Air Force did not comment on the decision and could not confirm whether it was the first same-sex union officially recognized by the branch. On 8 August 2013, Judge Elio Siqueira of the Regional Federal Court of the 5th region ruled on appeal that the Brazilian Army must recognize the stable union—performed in January 2012 in Pernambuco—of a service member and his same-sex partner, and must also grant the partner a military spousal pension. This marked the first time a state-recognized same-sex union was officially acknowledged by the Army.

== Same-sex marriage ==
Recognition of same-sex unions in South America Marriage Other type of partnership Unrecognized Constitution limits marriage to opposite-sex couples Same-sex sexual activity illegal, though penalties not enforced

=== Background and summary ===
Marriage in Brazil is governed at the federal level rather than by state law, and involves the issuing of a marriage license by a notary. In May 2011, the Supreme Federal Court ruled that the present law allowed for same-sex couples to formalize their relationships in the form of stable unions. On 25 October, the Superior Court of Justice ruled that two women could legally marry. Differently from the U.S. Supreme Court's stare decisis, the Superior Court decision only applied to the plaintiff couple, but would serve as legal precedent in similar cases. The court overturned two lower court rulings against the couple, and held that the Constitution of Brazil guarantees same-sex couples the right to marry and that the Civil Code does not prohibit the marriage of two people of the same sex. Using this decision as precedent, many states amended their directives for issuing marriage certificates to allow same-sex marriages and require notaries who preside over marriage licenses and perform marriages to provide such services to same-sex couples.

Article 226 of the Constitution establishes that marriage is a civil matter and that a "stable union between a man and a woman is recognized as a family entity, and the law shall facilitate the conversion of such entity into marriage". Additionally, it states:

The family, which is the foundation of society, shall enjoy special protection from the state. (Note: In some official and indigenous languages of Brazil: Portuguese: A família, base da sociedade, tem especial proteção do Estado.; Nheengatu: Anama, yãistadu tẽ ki istadu umukaáturu aῖtá purãga.)

=== National Justice Council ruling ===
On 14 May 2013, the National Justice Council ruling 14–1 that notaries must license and perform same-sex marriages and convert existing stable unions into marriages if the couples so desire. President of the Supreme Federal Court Joaquim Barbosa stated that notaries could not continue to refuse to "license and perform a civil marriage or the conversion of a stable union into a marriage between two people of the same sex." The ruling took effect on 16 May 2013.

On 21 May 2013, the Social Christian Party (PSC) filed an appeal with the Supreme Federal Court against the National Justice Council's decision. The party alleged that the Council had overstepped its authority, arguing that the legalization of same-sex marriage was a matter exclusively reserved for the National Congress. The appeal did not result in a stay of the Council's decision. On 30 May 2013, the Supreme Federal Court rejected the appeal on procedural grounds, stating that the PSC had used the incorrect legal instrument to appeal. The court held that the Council's decision could only be challenged through a "direct action for unconstitutionality" (ação direta de inconstitucionalidade) rather than an action for injunction (mandado de segurança). On 6 June 2013, the PSC refiled the appeal. Subsequently, on 28 August 2013, the Office of the Attorney General (Procuradoria Geral da República), along with the Cabinet of Brazil under President Dilma Rousseff, submitted an opinion in support of same-sex marriage to the Supreme Court. Given that the Council's ruling was issued by its president—who also served as Chief Justice of the Supreme Federal Court—it is unlikely the Court would overturn the decision. As of 2023, the PSC's appeal had not yet proceeded to oral arguments.

=== Proposals in the National Congress ===
The legal recognition of same-sex marriages in Brazil was achieved through the judicial system; Brazil has yet to pass a national same-sex marriage law. In October 2013, a parliamentary committee recommended a measure to ensure that religious institutions would not be obligated to solemnize same-sex marriages. The proposal would have allowed such institutions to refuse to officiate at marriages "[that] violate [their] values, doctrines, and beliefs". It was expected to be submitted to the National Congress pending approval by a constitutional committee, but no further action was taken before the 2014 elections. In March 2017, the Constitution and Justice Commission of the Brazilian Senate preliminarily approved a bill to align the Civil Code with the National Justice Council's ruling. The bill aimed to recognize stable unions between two people of the same sex and allow the conversion of such unions into marriage. It proposed replacing the definition of a family entity from "a stable union between a man and a woman" to "a stable union between two people", and included a provision explicitly stating that marriage may be performed between two people. The commission gave final approval to the bill on 3 May. However, it was not advanced by either the Senate or the Chamber of Deputies prior to the 2018 elections.

On 13 November 2024, the Human Rights Committee of the Chamber of Deputies approved a bill to codify same-sex marriage into federal civil law. The text of the bill was originally authored by former Congressman Clodovil Hernandes and was introduced by Congresswoman Erika Hilton.

=== State and district laws ===
Same-sex marriage in Brazil prior to 16 May 2013 Same-sex marriage readily licensed and performed Same-sex marriage only practiced upon court ruling

Prior to nationwide legalisation in 2013, marriage licenses were granted to same-sex couples in some individual cases, often through the decision of a judge. On 27 June 2011, a judge in the state of São Paulo converted a same-sex stable union into a marriage. The couple held a wedding ceremony the following day. That day, another same-sex stable union was converted into a marriage by Judge Jennifer Antunes de Souza from the 4th Family Court of Brasília. On 29 May 2012, four out of six notary offices in Porto Alegre agreed to convert stable unions into marriages, and on 31 May 2012 a civil partnership contracted by two men in England was recognized and converted into a marriage. On 28 June 2012, 28 same-sex couples were legally married in a mass wedding ceremony in Belém.

Following the 2011 Supreme Federal Court ruling on stable unions and the Superior Court of Justice ruling that a lesbian couple could legally marry, several states altered their marriage procedures, enabling same-sex couples to marry in a manner that is bureaucratically identical to opposite-sex couples. The first state to do so was Alagoas. On 6 December 2011, its General Judicial Inspectorate (Corregedoria Geral da Justiça)—a supervisory body within the state court system responsible for overseeing the proper functioning of the judiciary's administrative and auxiliary services, particularly in first-instance courts (i.e. trial courts) and registry services (such as marriages and births)—ordered the state civil registry to issue marriage licences to same-sex couples. The decision took effect upon publication on 7 December 2011.

Alagoas was followed by the neighboring state of Sergipe on 5 July 2012, when its General Judicial Inspectorate issued a provision legalizing same-sex marriage. On 11 July, the city of Santa Rita do Sapucaí also began issuing marriage licenses to same-sex couples following the decision of a judge. On 15 August 2012, the General Judicial Inspectorate of Espírito Santo similarly issued a circular letter obliging its civil registry to address same-sex marriages in the same manner as opposite-sex marriages, making it the third Brazilian state to legalize same-sex marriage. They were followed by Bahia on 26 November, the Federal District on 1 December, and Piauí on 15 December 2012. On 18 December 2012, the General Judicial Inspectorate of São Paulo also updated its marriage provisions to include same-sex couples in a manner equal to opposite-sex couples. The new provisions entered into effect 60 days later (i.e. 16 February 2013). Other states followed suit, including Ceará on 15 March, Paraná on 26 March, Mato Grosso do Sul on 2 April, Rondônia on 26 April, Paraíba and Santa Catarina on 29 April, and Mato Grosso on 13 May. The situation was different in Rio de Janeiro; on 17 April 2013 Judge Valmir de Oliveira Silva of the Justice Tribunal of Rio de Janeiro ruled that same-sex couples could marry in the state, but only if local judges approved their requests. According to the ruling, couples were required to submit their requests to civil registry officers, who had 15 days to issue a decision. If the request was approved, the marriage could proceed; if denied, the marriage would not be authorized.

=== Native Brazilians ===
While many Indigenous cultures historically practiced polygamy, there are no records of same-sex marriages being performed in these cultures in the way they are commonly defined in Western legal systems. However, many Indigenous communities recognize identities and relationships that may be placed on the LGBT spectrum. Among these are two-spirit individuals—people who embody both masculine and feminine qualities. In some cultures, two-spirit individuals assigned male at birth wear women's clothing and engage in household and artistic work associated with the feminine sphere. Historically, this identity sometimes allowed for unions between two people of the same biological sex. Anthropologist Darcy Ribeiro reported such two-spirit people, known as noǥaligijegi, among the Kadiwéu. They wear women's clothing, take care of the family, and marry cisgender men. The Tupinambá refer to them as tibira. One tibira, the Tibira do Maranhão, was executed in 1614 by the French on charges of sodomy. The Tupinambá also recognize two-spirit people who are born female but perform men's activities such as hunting. They marry women and adopt similar roles as men in the home. Similar individuals occupying a third gender role are also found among the Ticuna, the Karajá and the Krahô.

=== Statistics ===
In 2018, 9,520 same-sex couples married in Brazil; 59.7% of these marriages were performed in the Southeast Region, 15.1% in the Northeast Region, 14.4% in the South Region, 7.4% in the Central-West Region and 3.4% in the North Region. By state, most marriages were performed in São Paulo (4,100), followed by Minas Gerais (737), Rio de Janeiro (723), Rio Grande do Sul (480), Paraná (458), Santa Catarina (429), Pernambuco (391), Ceará (330), Bahia (288), the Federal District (274), Goiás (218), Pará (201), Mato Grosso do Sul (166), Espírito Santo (129), Rio Grande do Norte (114), Paraíba (105), Alagoas (95), Amazonas (49), Mato Grosso (46), Piauí (45), Sergipe (43), Maranhão (26), Rondônia (24), Acre and Tocantins (18), Amapá (8) and Roraima (5).

2018 saw a significant rise in marriages, particularly in the later months of the year, with November seeing a 68% rise compared to 2017. Figures for 2020 are lower than previous years because of the restrictions in place due to the COVID-19 pandemic.

Number of marriages performed in Brazil
Year	Same-sex marriages			Opposite-sex marriages	Total marriages	% same-sex
Year	Female	Male	Total	Opposite-sex marriages	Total marriages	% same-sex
2013	1,926	1,775	3,701	1,048,776	1,052,477	0.35%
2014	2,440	2,414	4,854	1,101,586	1,106,440	0.44%
2015	2,986	2,628	5,614	1,131,707	1,137,321	0.49%
2016	2,943	2,411	5,354	1,090,181	1,095,535	0.49%
2017	3,387	2,500	5,887	1,064,489	1,070,376	0.55%
2018	5,562	3,958	9,520	1,043,947	1,053,467	0.90%
2019	5,349	3,707	9,056	1,015,620	1,024,676	0.88%
2020	3,864	2,569	6,433	750,746	757,179	0.85%
2021	5,602	3,600	9,202	923,300	932,502	0.99%
2022	6,632	4,390	11,022	959,019	970,041	1.1%
2023	7,023	4,175	11,198	929,601	940,799	1.2%
2024	7,876	4,311	12,187	936,738	948,925	1.3%

=== Religious performance ===
Most major religious organisations in Brazil do not perform or bless same-sex marriages in their places of worship. The largest Christian denomination in Brazil is the Catholic Church, which opposes same-sex marriage and does not allow its priests to officiate at marriages of same-sex couples. The Church campaigned heavily against legalization, decrying the 2011 ruling that legalized stable unions, and calling for protests against the 2013 ruling legalizing same-sex marriage. The Episcopal Conference of Brazil stated: "Same sex unions cannot simply be equated to marriage or family, which are based on matrimonial consent, in the spirit of complementarity and reciprocity between a man and a woman, open to the procreation and education of children." In April 2013, it excommunicated Father Roberto Francisco Daniel, a supporter of same-sex marriage in Bauru, over "grave statements counter to the dogma of Catholic faith and morality." In December 2023, the Holy See published Fiducia supplicans, a declaration allowing Catholic priests to bless couples who are not considered to be married according to church teaching, including the blessing of same-sex couples. Reactions were mixed. The Archbishop of Porto Alegre, Jaime Spengler, stated, "I ask a very simple question, which guides me and also guides my actions: are they people? If they are people, they deserve our respect too. And when they come to us asking for a blessing, I imagine that they are also looking for a word of comfort, of hope and perhaps even the desire to cope with their own situation. We can't deny that!" The Diocese of Petrópolis issued a statement that "[t]hese people, with these conditions and dispositions, can receive a prayer from the priest, an invocation of God's mercy and help so that they can live according to God's will. This should be an opportunity to proclaim the kerygma to them. Blessings to groups who intend to justify an irregular situation, objectively contrary to Christian morality and the true nature of marriage, which would cause confusion and scandal among the faithful, are therefore forbidden." The Bishop of Formosa, Adair José Guimarães, said he would not offer blessings to same-sex couples, following consultation with the local clergy and lay people that "applying the resolution would bring incomprehension and scandal".

Pentecostal and Evangelical groups have been vocally opposed to the legalization of same-sex unions. In June 2013, the Assembleias de Deus, led by Pastor Silas Malafaia, organized a rally against the National Justice Council ruling in Brasília. "This is a historic day... We are here in support of the family made up of a man and a woman. We will not allow this country to sink into immorality", said one pastor who attended the march. Around 40,000 people attended the protest according to the organizers; police counted 6,000 attendees. "Satan will not destroy our family values", added Malafaia, who also organized a similar demonstration in Rio de Janeiro the previous month.

In 2011, the Evangelical Church of the Lutheran Confession in Brazil released a pastoral letter accepting the Supreme Court's decision to allow same-sex stable unions, although religious same-sex marriages are not allowed in the denomination. The ruling was also welcomed by some Baptist groups. Some smaller religious denominations support and solemnise same-sex marriages. In June 2018, the Anglican Episcopal Church of Brazil officially changed its canons to permit same-sex marriages. The move was approved by its synod by 57 votes to 3. The Church joined other Anglican provinces, including the American, Scottish and Canadian branches of the Anglican Communion, in performing same-sex weddings. The first same-sex marriage in an Anglican church occurred in São Paulo on 24 November 2018. Several same-sex marriages have also been conducted in Umbanda and Candomblé ceremonies. An Umbanda priestess in Rio de Janeiro said in 2011 that "in umbanda this is accepted. It's fine. … We carry out marriages of love." Some Jewish groups also solemnise same-sex marriages.

== Public opinion ==
Support for same-sex marriage among 18–21-year-olds according to a 2016 survey from the Varkey Foundation

According to a Pew Research Center survey conducted between 4 November 2013 and 14 February 2014, 45% of Brazilians supported same-sex marriage, while 48% were opposed. A September–October 2016 survey by the Varkey Foundation found that 59% of 18–21-year-olds supported same-sex marriage in Brazil.

According to the Brazilian Institute of Public Opinion and Statistics, support for equal marital rights for same-sex couples in Brazil stood at 49% in 2017, with 38% opposing. Support was higher among women, young people, people with higher educational levels and Brazilians living in the southern region of the country. The 2017 AmericasBarometer showed that 52% of Brazilians supported same-sex marriage. A May 2021 Ipsos poll showed that 55% of respondents supported same-sex marriage, 14% favored other forms of legal recognition, while 18% were opposed to all legal recognition for same-sex couples, and 13% were undecided.

The 2023 Latinobarómetro estimated that support for same-sex marriage had decreased to 47%, while opposition had increased to 49%. According to a Pew Research Center survey conducted in spring 2023, 52% of Brazilians supported same-sex marriage, while 40% were opposed. A June 2023 Ipsos poll showed that 51% of respondents supported same-sex marriage, 15% favored other forms of legal recognition, while 14% were opposed to all legal recognition for same-sex couples, and 20% were undecided. The survey also showed that 69% of Brazilians believed same-sex couples should receive the same adoption rights as opposite-sex couples, and 71% said that same-sex couples were just as likely as other parents to be successful in raising children. A July 2025 Ipsos poll showed that 47% of Brazilians opposed same-sex marriage, while 36% supported. A February 2026 PoderData poll showed that 52% of Brazilians supported same-sex marriage, while 39% opposed and the remainder were undecided or had refused to answer.

== See also ==
- LGBT rights in Brazil
- ADI 4277 and ADPF 132
- Rcl 12876 and MS 32077
- Recognition of same-sex unions in the Americas
- Brazilian Institute of Family Law
