= Júlio de Castilhos, Rio Grande do Sul =

Municipality of Rio Grande do Sul, Brazil

Júlio de Castilhos
- Municipality
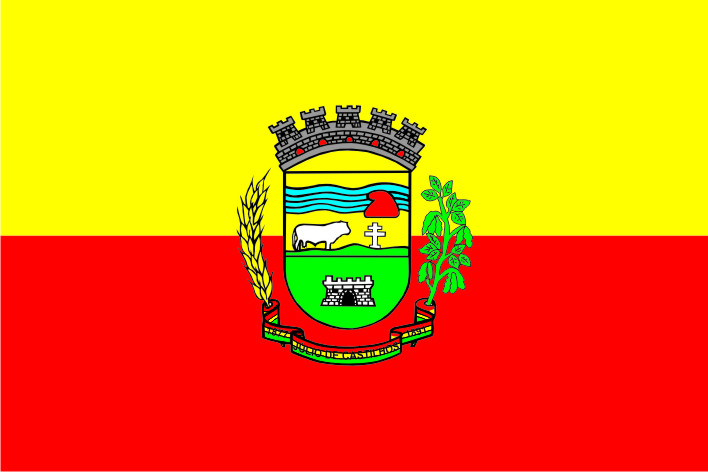
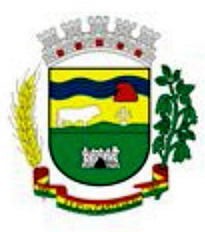
- Flag Coat of arms

- Location in Rio Grande do Sul state

- Location in Brazil
- Coordinates: 29°13′37″S 53°40′54″W
- Country: Brazil
- Region: South
- State: Rio Grande do Sul
- Mesoregion: Centro Ocidental Rio-Grandense
- Microregion: Santiago

Area
  - Total: 1,929.38 km^{2} (744.94 sq mi)
- Elevation: 513 m (1,683 ft)

Population (2020)
  - Total: 19,224
  - Density: 9.9638/km^{2} (25.806/sq mi)
- Time zone: UTC−3 (BRT)
- Postal code: 98130-xxx
- Website: www.juliodecastilhos.rs.gov.br

Júlio de Castilhos is a municipality of the central part of the state of Rio Grande do Sul, Brazil. The population is 19,224 (2020 est.) in an area of 1,929.38 km². Its elevation is 529 m (Praça "João Vieira de Alvarenga"), 516 m at the meteorological station and 503.81 m at the railway station. It is located 627 km west of the state capital of Porto Alegre, northeast of Alegrete. The city is considered the Brazilian capital of the Charolais cattle.

The municipality is named after the Brazilian advocate, journalist and politician Júlio Prates de Castilhos.

== History ==
According to historian Firmino Costa, the land was Indian and was part of the Spanish Empire until 1801, when it was annexed to Portugal.

The first pioneers came from the states São Paulo and Paraná. In 1812 or 1813, João Vieira de Alvarenga, about 24, with his wife, Maria Rosa de Morais, and his first son, Manoel, claimed lands between the pioneer cities with the title Sesmaria, which it received in 1826. In 1834, the municipality of Cruz Alta was founded and was separated from Rio Pardo.

The municipality was created from the lands of the district of São Martinho, in Cruz Alta. In 1876, with the emancipation of São Martinho, the district of Povo Novo was created. On July 14, 1891, the municipality of Vila Rica (the new name of Povo Novo) separated from São Martinho.

The first municipal elections were held in 1896, with Capitão Luiz Gonzaga de Azevedo as the winner and the first mayor. In 1905, the city was renamed to its current name, Júlio de Castilhos.

== Climate ==
Climate data for Júlio de Castilhos, elevation 490 m (1,610 ft), (1976–2005)
Month	Jan	Feb	Mar	Apr	May	Jun	Jul	Aug	Sep	Oct	Nov	Dec	Year
Mean daily maximum °C (°F)	28.9 (84.0)	28.1 (82.6)	27.0 (80.6)	23.9 (75.0)	20.7 (69.3)	18.2 (64.8)	18.2 (64.8)	19.5 (67.1)	21.0 (69.8)	23.7 (74.7)	26.1 (79.0)	28.2 (82.8)	23.6 (74.5)
Daily mean °C (°F)	23.5 (74.3)	23.0 (73.4)	21.9 (71.4)	18.9 (66.0)	15.8 (60.4)	13.5 (56.3)	13.3 (55.9)	14.4 (57.9)	15.9 (60.6)	18.4 (65.1)	20.5 (68.9)	22.6 (72.7)	18.5 (65.2)
Mean daily minimum °C (°F)	18.1 (64.6)	17.9 (64.2)	16.8 (62.2)	13.9 (57.0)	11.0 (51.8)	8.7 (47.7)	8.4 (47.1)	9.4 (48.9)	10.9 (51.6)	13.1 (55.6)	14.8 (58.6)	17.0 (62.6)	13.3 (56.0)
Average precipitation mm (inches)	135.9 (5.35)	136.4 (5.37)	118.2 (4.65)	148.2 (5.83)	126.1 (4.96)	145.9 (5.74)	155.2 (6.11)	116.5 (4.59)	150.0 (5.91)	177.3 (6.98)	149.1 (5.87)	119.7 (4.71)	1,678.5 (66.07)
Average relative humidity (%)	75	78	79	80	81	82	81	78	78	76	73	71	78
Mean monthly sunshine hours	271	233	237	204	187	155	167	178	183	227	253	281	2,576
Source: Empresa Brasileira de Pesquisa Agropecuária (EMBRAPA)
