= Nova Palma =

Municipality of Rio Grande do Sul, Brazil

- Municipality
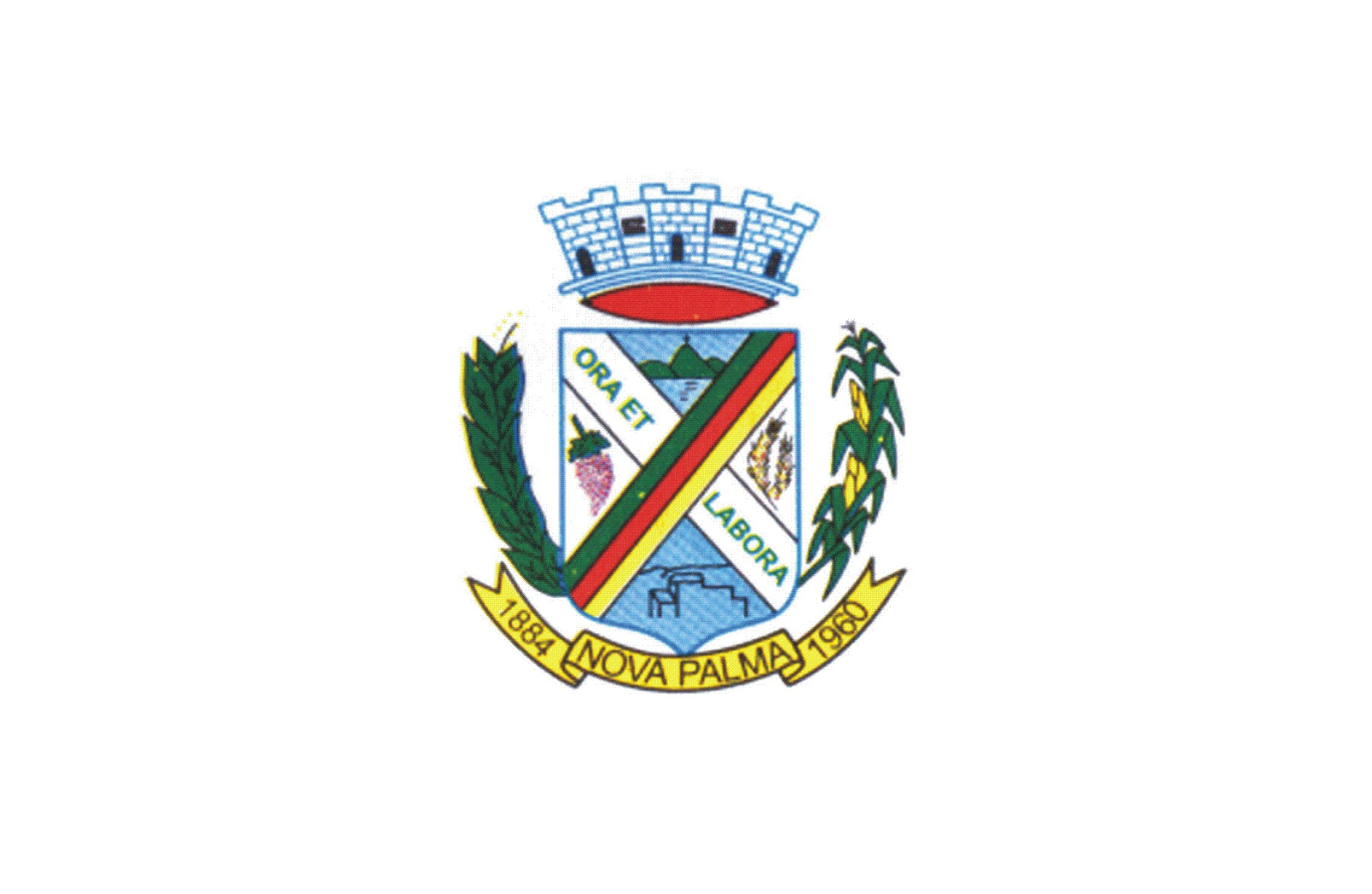
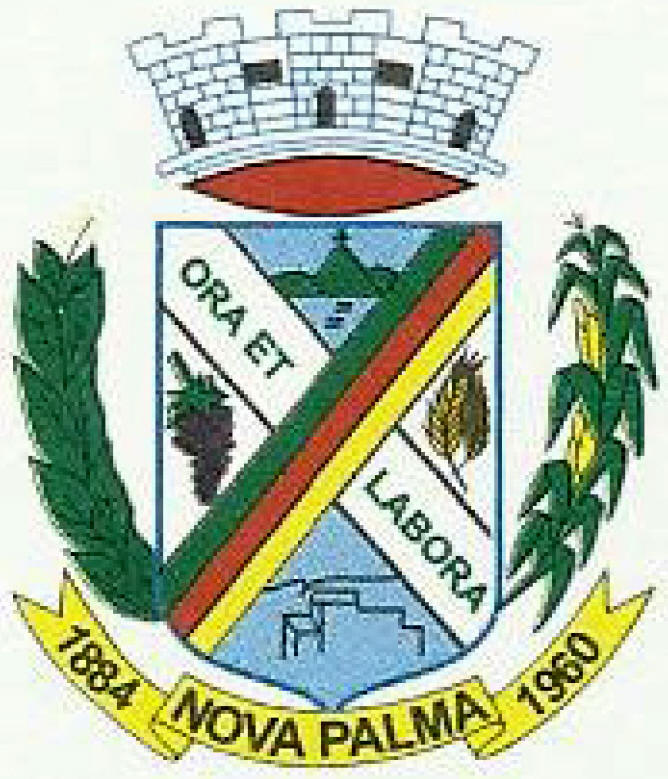
- Flag Coat of arms

- Location within Rio Grande do Sul

- Location in Brazil
- Coordinates: 29°28′19″S 53°28′8″W
- Country: Brazil
- State: Rio Grande do Sul

Population (2020)
  - Total: 6,515
- Time zone: UTC−3 (BRT)

Nova Palma is a municipality in the state of Rio Grande do Sul, Brazil.

The municipality contains part of the hydroelectric Dona Francisca Dam on the upper Jacuí River.

== See also ==
- List of municipalities in Rio Grande do Sul
- Italian immigration in Rio Grande do Sul
- Dona Francisca Hydroelectric Plant
