= Alegrete Airport =

Gaudêncio Machado Ramos Airport Aeroporto Gaudêncio Machado Ramos
- IATA: ALQ; ICAO: SSLT; LID: RS0022

Summary
- Airport type: Public
- Serves: Alegrete
- Time zone: BRT (UTC−03:00)
- Elevation AMSL: 125 m (410 ft)
- Coordinates: 29°48′45″S 055°53′36″W

Map
- Location in Brazil ALQ (Brazil)

Runways
Direction	Length		Surface
Direction	m	ft	Surface
15/33	1,200	3,937	Asphalt
- Sources: ANAC, DECEA

Gaudêncio Machado Ramos Airport (IATA: ALQ, ICAO: SSLT), informally known as Alegrete Novo Airport, is the airport serving Alegrete, Brazil.

== History ==
The airport was built as a replacement to an older facility located closer to downtown which was then closed.

== Access ==
The airport is located 12 km (7 mi) from downtown Alegrete.

== See also ==
- List of airports in Brazil
