= Brazilian Institute of Family Law =

Brazilian civil association

- Abbreviation: IBDFAM
- Formation: 1997
- Type: Family Policy Think Tank
- Location: Belo Horizonte
- Founder: Maria Berenice Dias
- Website: ibdfam.com.br

The Brazilian Institute of Family Law or IBDFAM (from Instituto Brasileiro de Direito de Família, in Portuguese) is a non-profit civil association founded on October 25, 1997, in the city of Belo Horizonte, state of Minas Gerais, Brazil, during the First Congress of Brazilian Family Law.

The national headquarters of the Brazilian Institute of Family Law is located in Belo Horizonte. However, IBDFAM has representatives in all states of the union through its state and regional leaderships.

Justice Maria Berenice Dias of the state of Rio Grande do Sul is the founder of the Brazilian Institute of Family Law and is currently its vice-president (in 2006). Dr. Dias was the very first female judge to take the bench in her home state. She also became a nominee to the Supreme Court of Justice of Brazil at the start of 2006.

Some of the main goals of IBDFAM are to "conduct studies and research, to promote discussions with an interdisciplinary focus and to foster the overall well-being of the Brazilian family." The Institute "works to further and ensure the civic rights of all members of Brazilian society, and of all Brazilian families - traditional and non-traditional." IBDFAM also promotes and seeks to participate in dialogues and round tables throughout Brazil and abroad.

== See also ==
- Same-sex marriage in Brazil
- Lei Maria da Penha
