= ADI 4277 and ADPF 132 =

Brazil Supreme Court cases

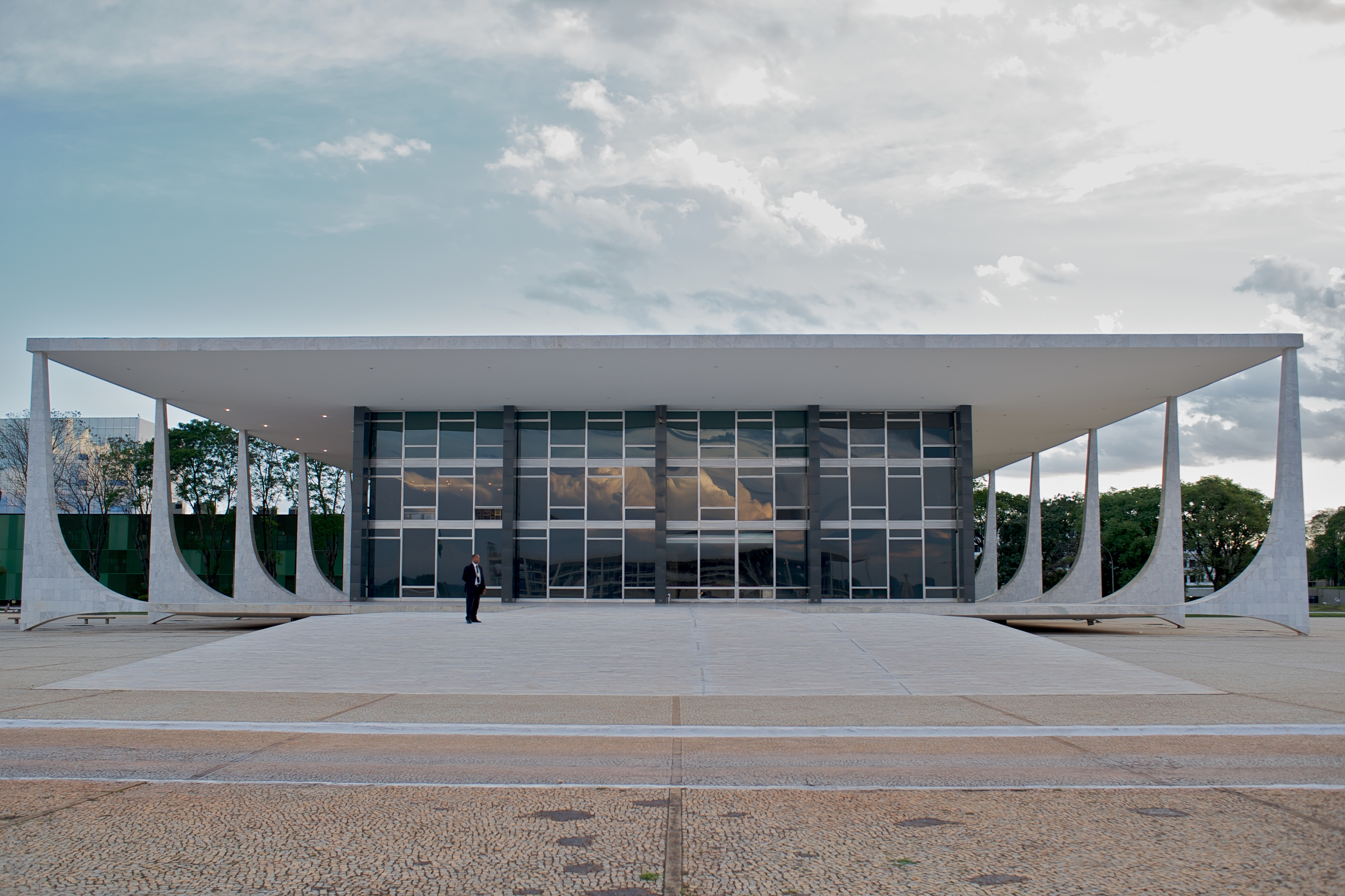
- Court: Supreme Federal Court
- Full case name: ADI 4277 (Prosecutor General v. President of the Republic) and ADPF 132 (Governor of the State of Rio de Janeiro v. Courts of Justice of the States)
- Decided: May 5, 2011
- Citation: Supreme Court of Brazil recognizes same-sex civil unions in the country

Court membership
- Judges sitting: President Cezar Peluso Justices: Carlos Ayres Britto; Cármen Lúcia; Ellen Gracie; Ricardo Lewandowski; Gilmar Mendes; Joaquim Barbosa; Celso de Mello; Luiz Fux; Marco Aurélio Mello

Case opinions
- Decision by: Britto
- Concurrence: Peluzo, Lúcia, Gracie, Lewandowski, Mendes, Barbosa, Mello, Fux and Aurélio

Keywords
- LGBT rights in Brazil; Same-sex marriage in Brazil

ADI 4277 and ADPF 132 (May 5, 2011) are landmark Brazil Supreme Court cases related to the recognition of same-sex civil unions. The Court ruled that the concept of family expressed in the country's Constitution is not limited to heterosexual couples.

== Rights ==
After of the decision of the Supreme Court, the same 112 rights of different-sex marriages were given to same-sex stable relationships too, creating a de facto civil union system, including the most important:

- Adoption
- Inheritance
- Pension
- Health plan

== High Court decision ==
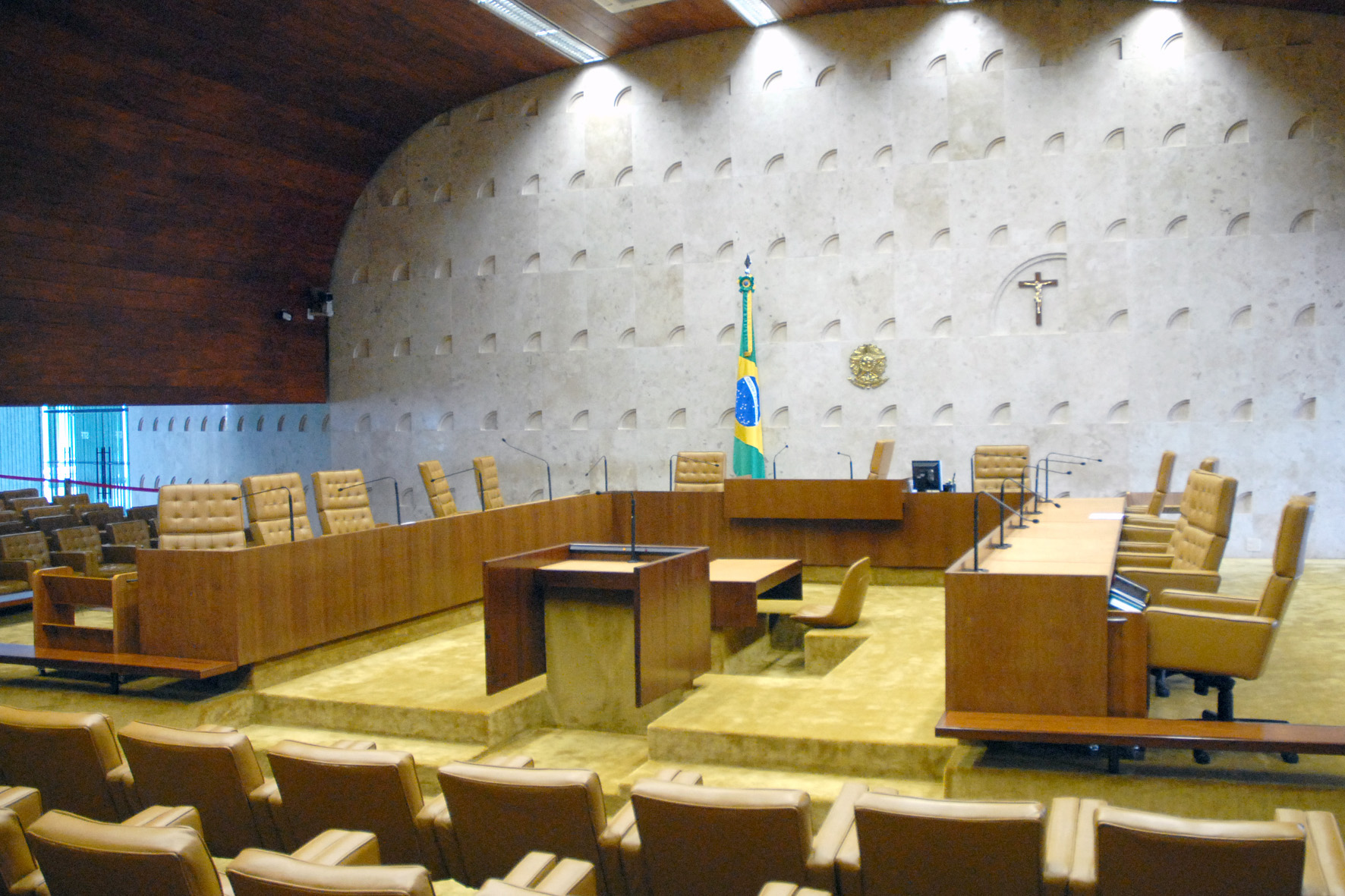
Supreme Court of Brazil.

The decision was approved 10–0; one judge abstained because he had previously spoken publicly in favor of same-sex unions when he was attorney general. The ruling was issued in response to two lawsuits: one filed by the Rio de Janeiro State Government in 2008 and another filed in 2009 by the Public Prosecutor's Office. Same-sex couples can officially register their relationships as a civil union by providing evidence such as a shared bank account, cohabitation at the same address, or other indicators of a committed partnership.

=== Judiciary representation ===
Supreme Court members	Ministers	Yes	No
Ayres Britto	1	1	
Cármen Lúcia	1	1	
Celso de Mello	1	1	
Cezar Peluso	1	1	
Ellen Gracie	1	1	
Gilmar Mendes	1	1	
Joaquim Barbosa	1	1	
Luiz Fux	1	1	
Marco Aurélio Mello	1	1	
Ricardo Lewandowski	1	1	
Total	10	10	0

=== Legislative representation ===
Prosecutor General	Prosecutor	Yes	No
Roberto Gurgel	1	1	
Total	1	1	0

=== Executive representation ===
Attorney General	Attorney	Yes	No
Luís Inácio Adams	1	1	
Total	1	1	0

=== Amici curiae ===
Amici curiae (Support for ADPF 132 and ADI 4277) (13)
Conectas Direitos Humanos	Brazilian Association of Gays, Lesbians, Bisexuals, Travestis, Transsexuals and Intersex People (ABGLT)	Association of Incentive to Education and Health of São Paulo	Brazilian Institute of Family Law (IBDFAM)	Rainbow Group of Homosexual Awareness	Brazilian Society of Public Law (SBDP)	Gay Group of Bahia (GGB)	Institute of Bioethics, Humans Rights and Gender (ANIS)	International Law Study Group of the Federal University of Minas Gerais (GEDI - UFMG)	Association of Travestis and Transexuals of Minas Gerais (ASSTRAV)	Center of Fight for Free Sexual Orientation (CELLOS)	Center of References of Gays, Lesbians, Bisexuals, Travestis, Transsexuals e Transgender People of the State Minas Gerais (Center of References GLBTTT)	Office of Human Right of the State of Minas Gerais (EDH)

Amici curiae (Against ADPF 132 and ADI 4277) (2)
Eduardo Banks Association	National Conference of Bishops of Brazil (CNBB)

== See also ==
- Recognition of same-sex unions in Brazil
- Brazilian Congressional Bill No. 1151
- Civil union
- LGBTQ rights in the Americas
- LGBTQ rights in Brazil
