= Jacuí River =

Coordinates: 30.0328°S 51.2461°W

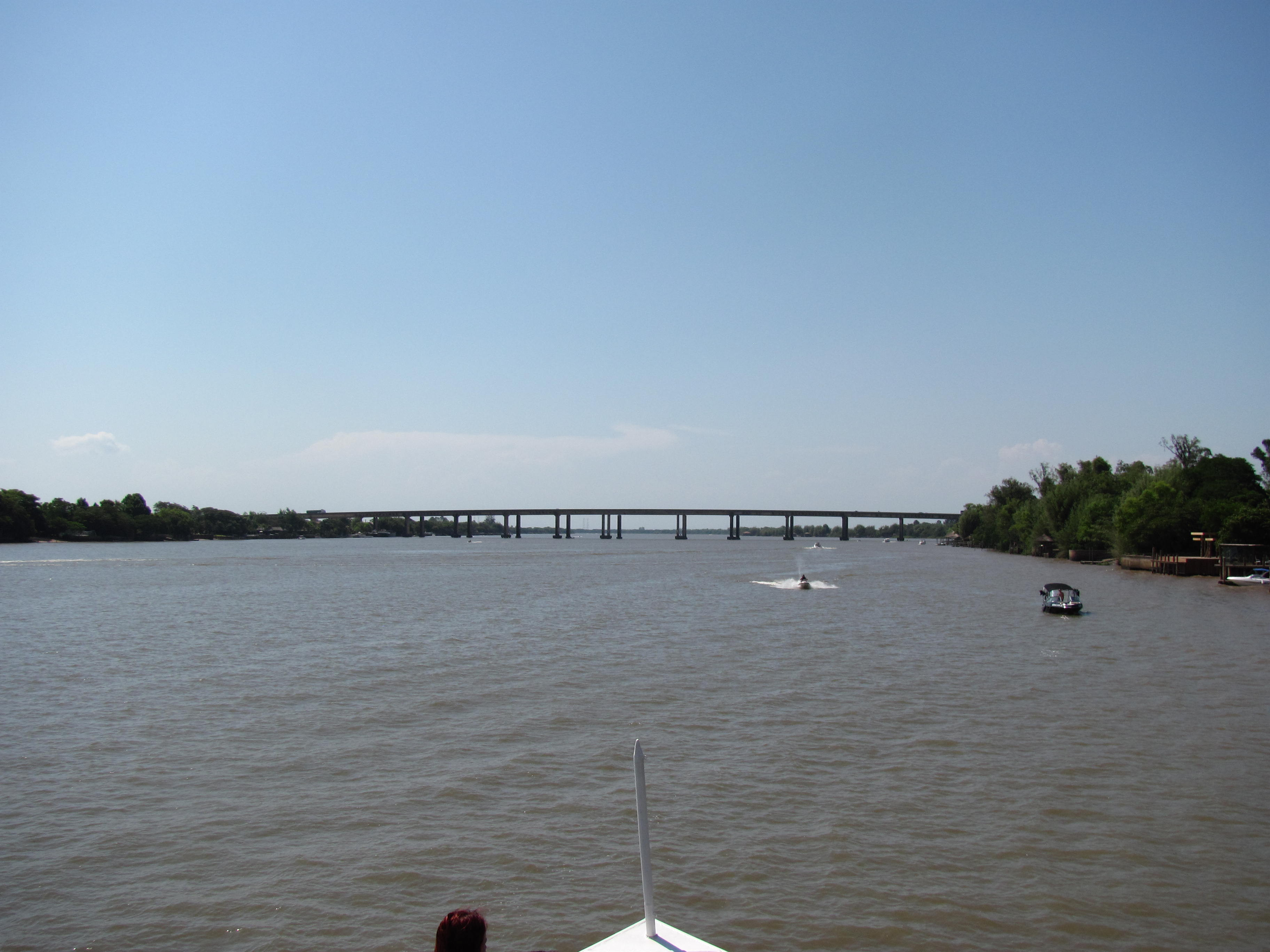
- The Jacuí River near Porto Alegre

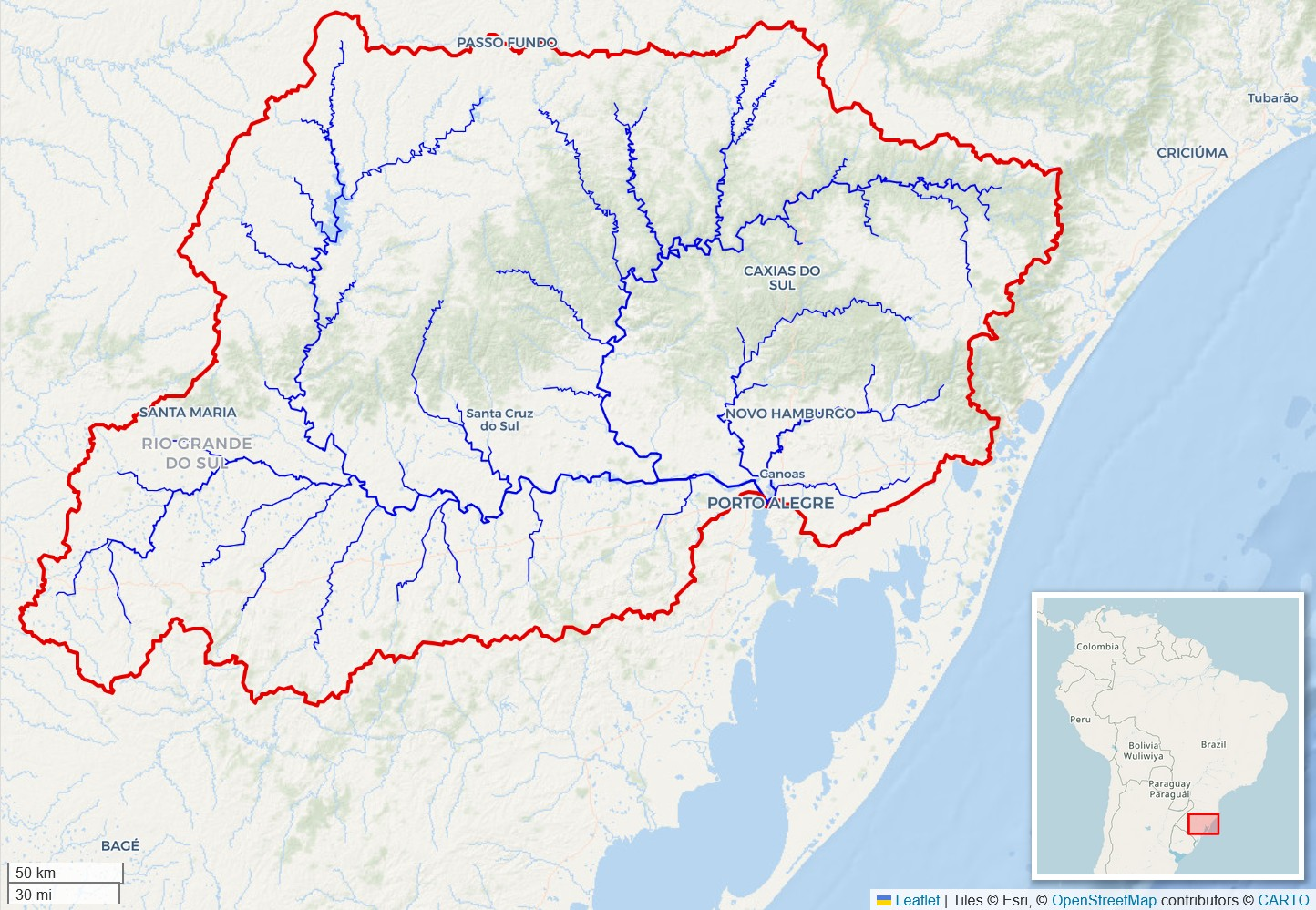
- Jacuí River watershed (Interactive map)
- Native name: Rio Jacuí (Portuguese)

Location
- Country: Brazil

Physical characteristics
- Source
  - location: Rio Grande do Sul state
  - elevation: 720 m (2,360 ft)
- Mouth
  - location: Lago Guíaba at Porto Alegre, Brazil
  - coordinates: 30.03, -51.25
- Length: 723 km (449 mi)
- Basin size: 71,807.9 km^{2} (27,725.2 mi^{2})
- Discharge
  - location: Porto Alegre (near mouth)
  - average: (Period: 1970-2000) 2,086.5 m^{3}/s (73,680 cu ft/s)

The Jacuí River (Portuguese pronunciation: [ʒakuˈi]) is a river in Rio Grande do Sul state of southern Brazil. The Jacuí empties into the Guaíba River, an estuarine arm of the Lagoa dos Patos, a large coastal lagoon connected to the Atlantic Ocean.

== Sources ==
The Jacuí River, known as 'Rio Jacuí' in Portuguese, has its origins in the highlands east of Passo Fundo. From there it flows south and then east for nearly 300 mi (480 km). The Taquari, Caí, Sinos, and Gravataí rivers merge into the Jacuí near its mouth. At Porto Alegre, near the Atlantic coast, the Jacuí transforms into a shallow estuary, known as the Guaíba River, and flows into the Patos Lagoon. Boats can travel up the river as far as Cachoeira do Sul.

== Regional effects ==
The Dona Francisca Hydroelectric Dam impounds the upper Jacuí River, and is divided between the municipalities of Agudo and Nova Palma, Rio Grande do Sul. The Quarta Colônia State Park is on the left bank of the reservoir of the Dona Francisca dam, with an area of 1,847.9 hectares (4,566 acres). The park was created in 2005 as environmental compensation for the hydroelectric plant.

The estuary contains the Banhados do Delta Biological Reserve, which protects the islands of Pólvora and Pombas.
