= Alegrete =

Municipality in Rio Grande do Sul, Brazil

- Municipality
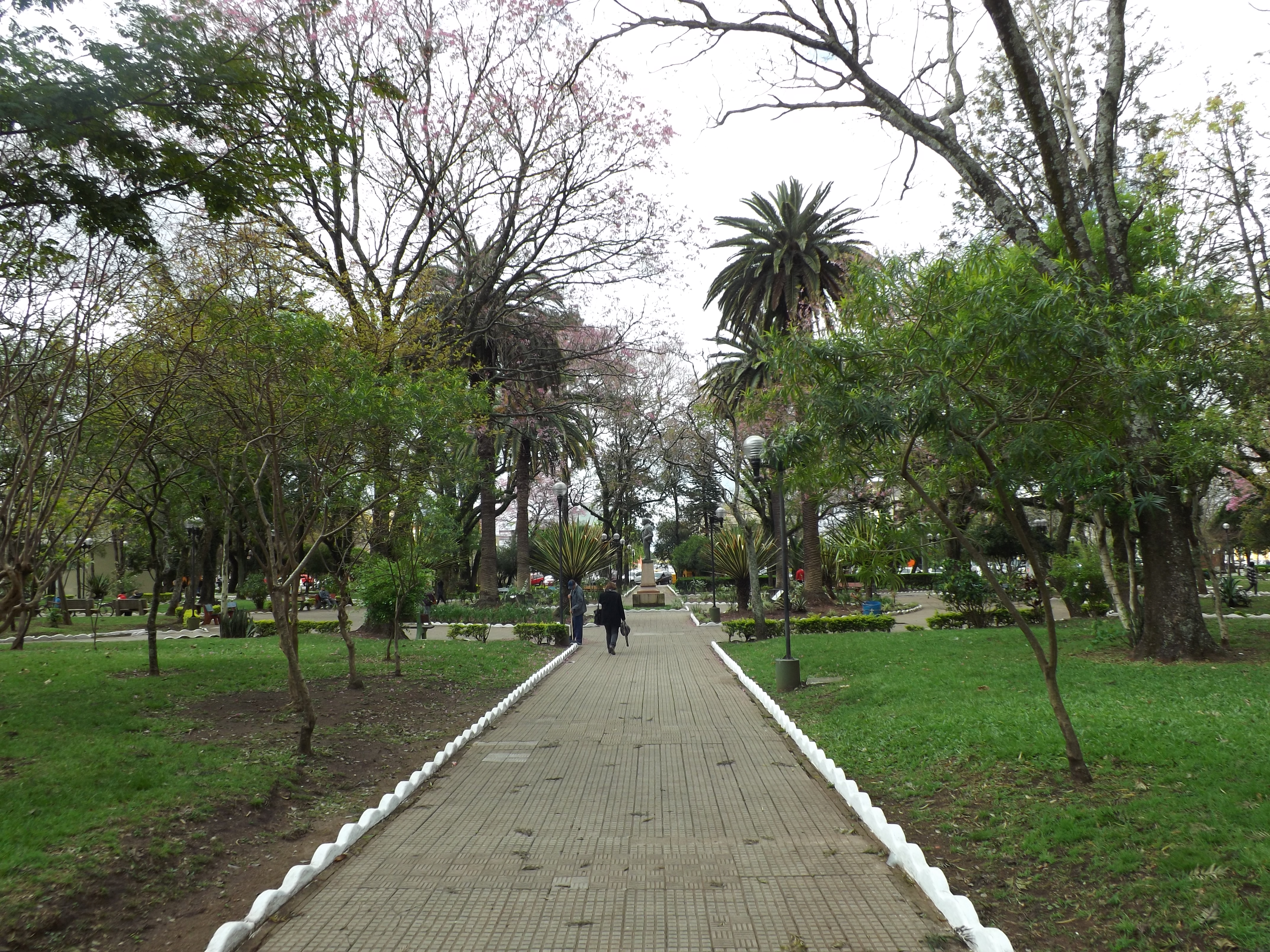
- Getúlio Vargas Square

- Flag Coat of arms
- Nickname: "Baita Chão" ("Hell of a Ground")
- Location in Rio Grande do Sul and Brazil
- Coordinates: 29°47′01.63″S 55°47′27.54″W
- Country: Brazil
- Region: Sul
- State: Rio Grande do Sul
- Founded: 25 October 1831

Government
  - Mayor: Jesse Trindade (MDB)

Area
  - Total: 7,804 km^{2} (3,013 sq mi)
- Elevation: 102 m (335 ft)

Population (2020)
  - Total: 73,028
  - Density: 9.358/km^{2} (24.24/sq mi)
- Time zone: UTC−3 (BRT)
- HDI' (2000): 0.793 – medium
- Website: alegrete.rs.gov.br

Alegrete (Portuguese: [a.leˈɡɾe.t͡ʃi]) is a municipality in Rio Grande do Sul located in southern Brazil. Its medium altitude is 102 m (335 ft). Its estimated population in 2020 was 73,028 inhabitants and its total area is 7,803.967 km^{2} (3,013.129 sq mi), making it the largest municipality by area in southern Brazil. Its inhabitants are called Alegretenses.

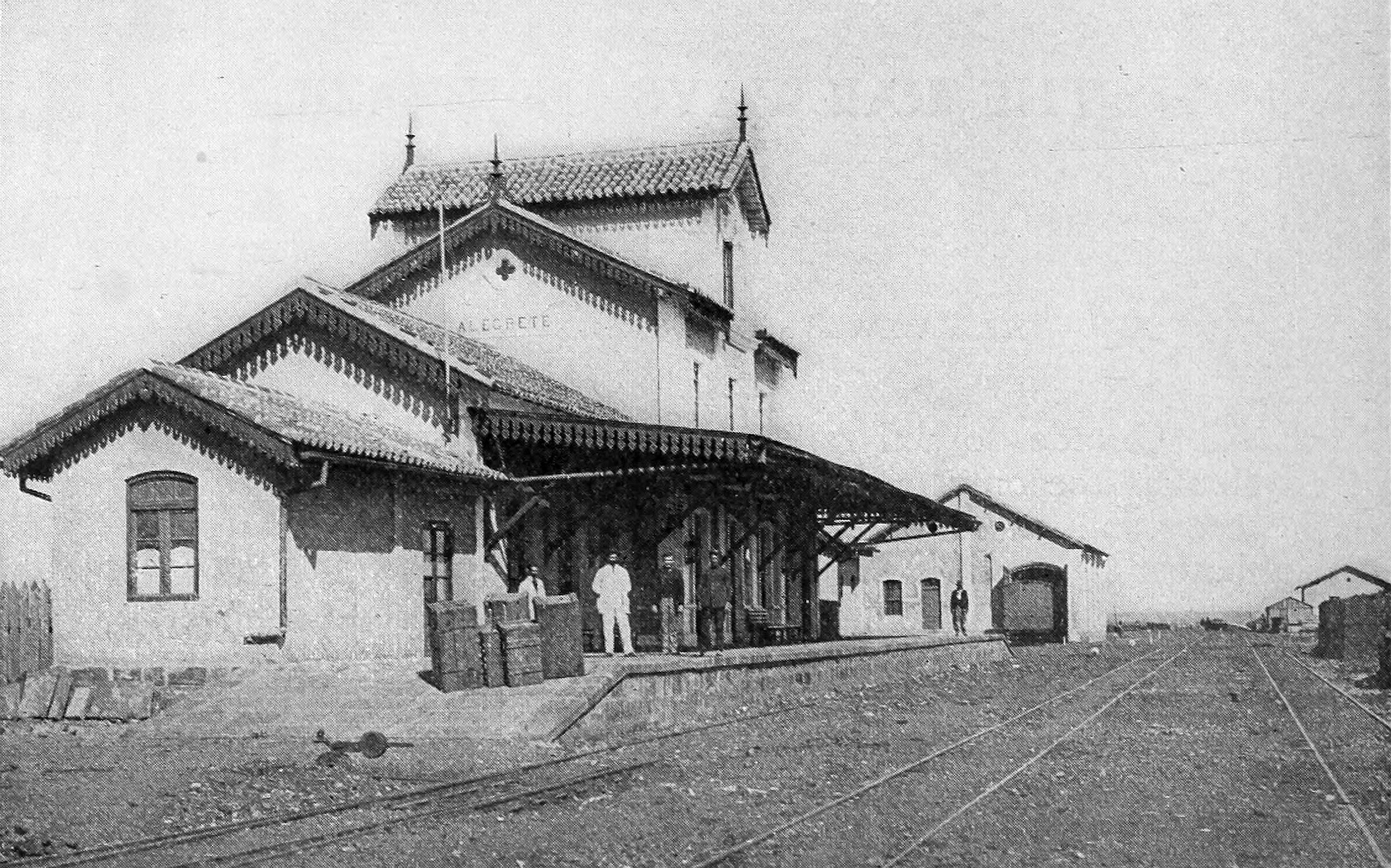
Railroad depot in Alegrete, 1911

Alegrete was settled in 1816 and became a municipality in 1857. It is the hometown of the abolitionist leader Franklin Gomes Souto, of the politician, diplomat and statesman Osvaldo Aranha, first President of the United Nations General Assembly, and of the Brazilian poet Mário Quintana. Every 20 September (Ragamuffin War Day), about 8,000 young, adult and old horsemen and horsewomen parade through its streets, using their native costumes and riding their horses with trappings.

Alegrete is served by Gaudêncio Machado Ramos Airport.

The municipality contains part of the 351 hectares (870 acres) Ibirapuitã Biological Reserve, a fully protected conservation unit created in 1982 to preserve an area of the pampas biome.

== See also ==
- List of municipalities in Rio Grande do Sul
