= Centro Ocidental Rio-Grandense =

Coordinates: 29°41′02″S 53°48′25″W

- Mesoregion
- Country: Brazil
- State: Rio Grande do Sul

Area
  - Total: 25,954.69 km^{2} (10,021.16 sq mi)

Population (2005)
  - Total: 556,062
  - Density: 21.4243/km^{2} (55.4888/sq mi)

The Centro Ocidental Rio-Grandense (Brazilian Portuguese: Western Center of Rio Grande) is one of the seven mesoregions of the state of Rio Grande do Sul in Brazil. It consists of 31 municipalities, grouped in three microregions: Restinga Seca, Santa Maria and Santiago
