= Ficha Limpa =

Brazilian electoral law

Lei da Ficha Limpa
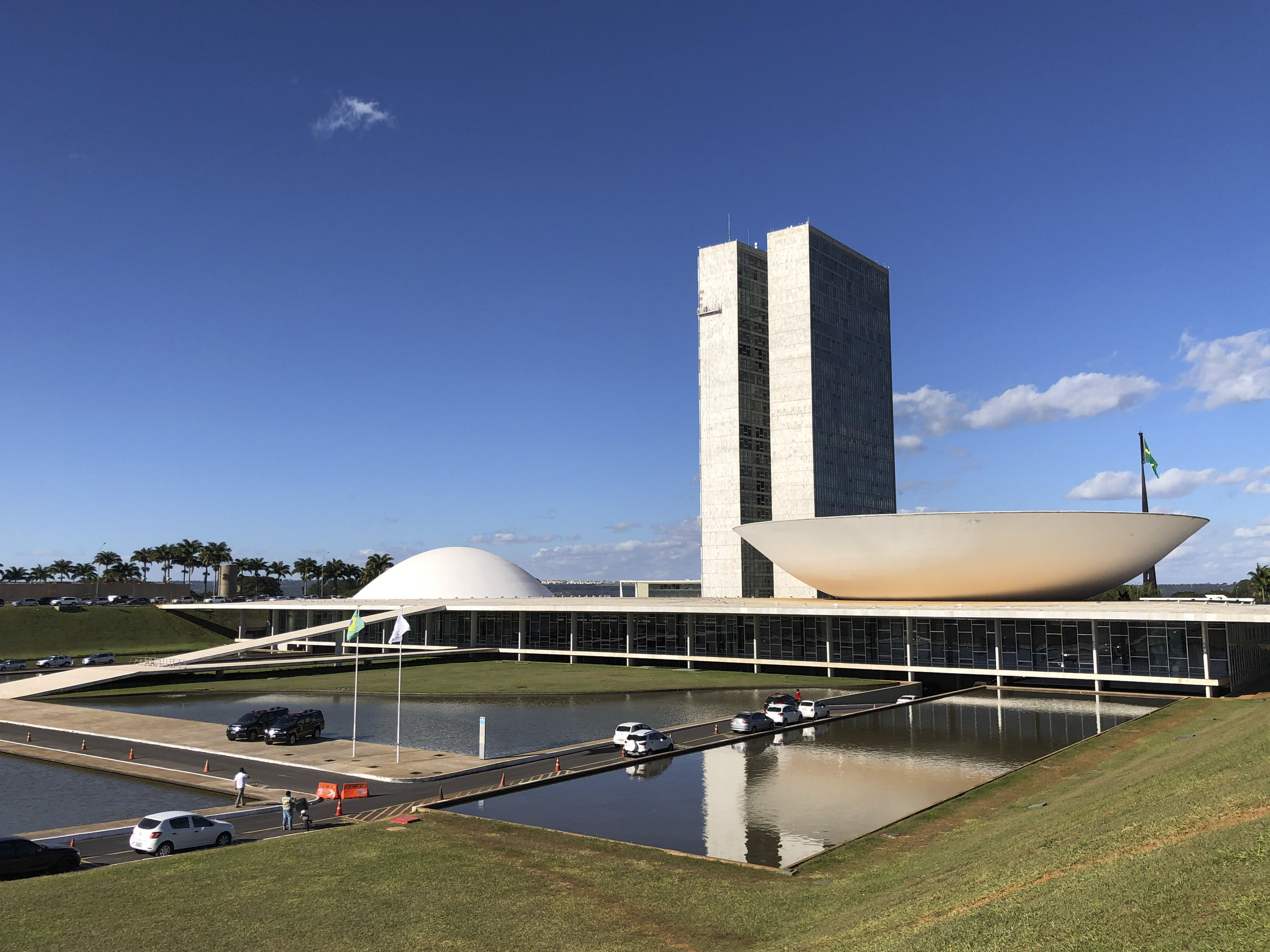

National Congress of Brazil
- Long title: Changes Complementary Law no. 64, of 18 May 1990, which establishes, according to § 9 of Article 14 of the Federal Constitution, cases of inelegibility, termination deadlines and determinates other providences, to include hypothesis of inelegibility that aims to protect the administrative probity and the morality in the exercise of the mandate.
- Citation: Complementary Law no. 135, of 4 June 2010
- Territorial extent: Whole of Brazil
- Passed by: Chamber of Deputies
- Passed: 11 May 2010
- Passed by: Federal Senate
- Passed: 19 May 2010
- Signed by: President Luiz Inácio Lula da Silva
- Signed: 4 June 2010
- Commenced: 4 June 2010

Legislative history

Initiating chamber: Chamber of Deputies
- Bill title: Complementary Bill 168/1993
- Bill citation: PLP 168/1993
- Introduced by: President Itamar Franco
- Introduced: 22 October 1993
- First reading: 22 October 1993
- Second reading: 14 November 2001
- Passed: 11 May 2010
- Voting summary: 388 voted for; 1 voted against; 23 absent; 1 present not voting

Revising chamber: Federal Senate
- Bill title: Chamber Bill 58/2010
- Bill citation: PLC 58/2010
- Received from the Chamber of Deputies: 13 May 2010
- Member(s) in charge: Chamber of Deputies
- First reading: 13 May 2010
- Second reading: 19 May 2010
- Passed: 19 May 2010
- Voting summary: 76 voted for; 4 absent; 1 present not voting

Amends
- Complementary Law no. 64/1990

Keywords
- Anti-corruption, elections in Brazil
- Status: In force

Lei da Ficha Limpa (English: Clean Record Act) or Complementary Law no. 135 of 2010 is a Brazilian act that amended the Conditions of Ineligibility Act (Complementary Law no. 64 of 1990). It was the fourth bill proposed by direct people's initiative as law in Brazil. It was devised by Judge Marlon Reis and received about 1.3 million signatures before being submitted to the National Congress. The act makes a candidate who has been impeached, has resigned to avoid impeachment, or been convicted by a decision of a collective body (with more than one judge) ineligible to hold public office for eight years, even if possible appeals remain.

The project was approved in the Chamber of Deputies on May 5, 2010, and by the Federal Senate on May 19, 2010, by unanimous vote. It was sanctioned by the President, Luiz Inácio Lula da Silva, and became the Supplementary Law no. 135 of June 4, 2010. In February 2012, the Supreme Federal Court (STF) deemed the law constitutional and valid for the next elections to be held in Brazil, which was considered a victory for the position advocated by the Superior Electoral Court in the 2010 elections.

== Origin ==
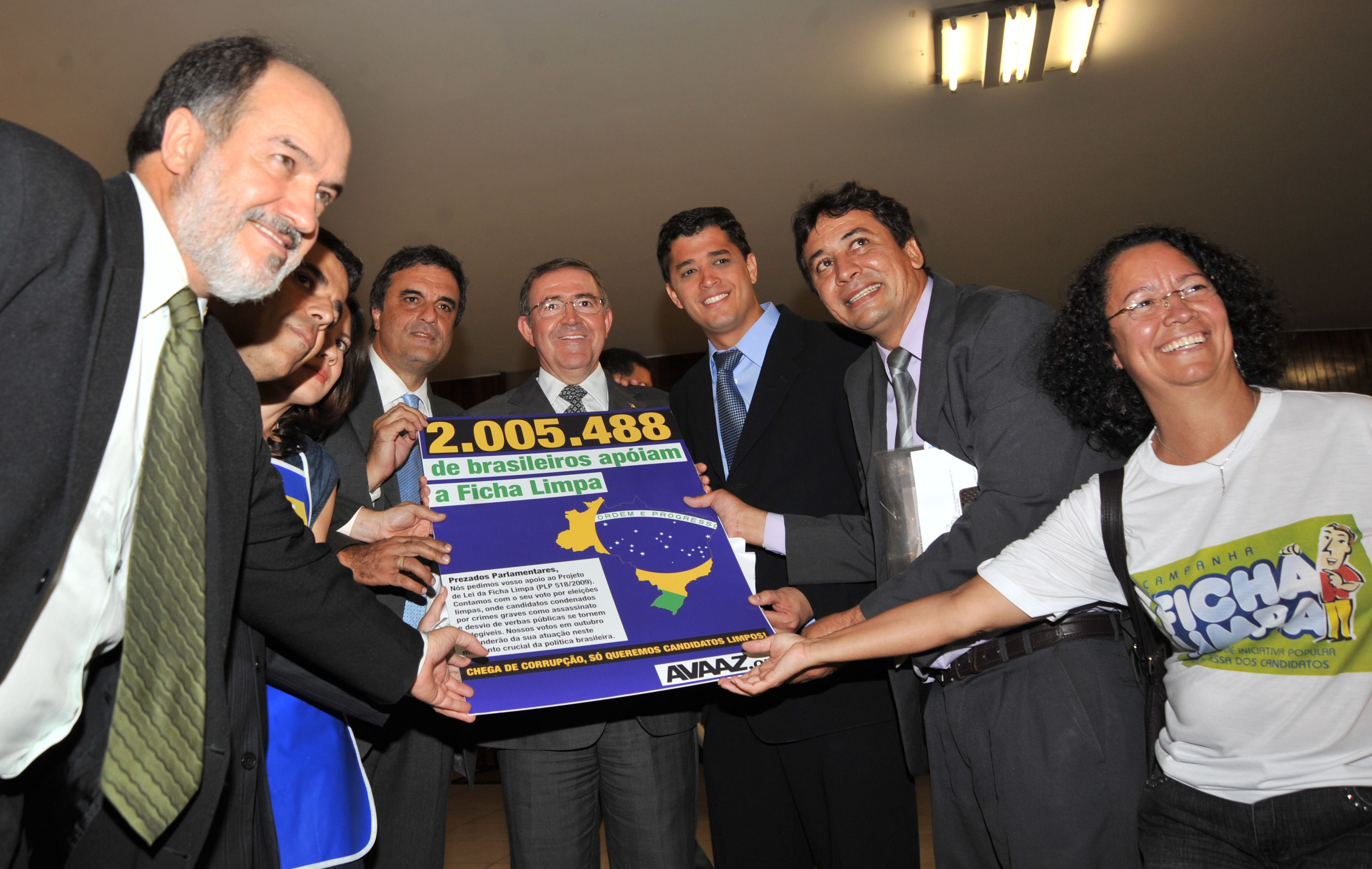
Group of deputies in favor of the Clean Record Act

The story of the Bill 519/09 began with an anti-corruption campaign in February 1997 by the Brazilian Commission for Justice and Peace (CBJP), and the National Conference of Bishops of Brazil (CNBB). This project continued a 1996 fraternity campaign of the CNBB titled "Brotherhood and Politics".

The petition was delivered to Congress on September 24, 2009, with 85% of the signatures collected in the parishes and dioceses of the CNBB (24 September 2009). was approved after a national campaign for its approval, the Clean Record campaign, led by the Movement to Combat Electoral Corruption (MCCE). The movement worked over a year to collect 1.3 million signatures (1% of the national electorate) in 26 states of the federation and the Federal District. The campaign to send the Chamber of Delegates a bill of popular initiative also included mobilizing through Twitter, Facebook, Orkut and the Brazilian chapter of Avaaz, a global network of activists.

== Superior Electoral Court ==
=== The first legal challenge to Clean Record ===
The first major challenge to the Clean Record Act for elections took place in the Supreme Electoral Tribunal. It concerned the 2010 general elections, presided by Justice Ricardo Lewandowski. By six votes to one, Justice Marco Aurélio's vote prevailed, holding that the law would apply to that year's election. Lewandowski, as president of the TSE, visited many Regional Electoral Courts, seeking the enforcement of the law.

Visiting TRE Ceará, on 29 July 2010, the then-president of the Supreme Electoral Tribunal said:

The TSE guides all TREs to adopt the Clean Record earlier this year. This is the orientation of the TSE, as we move away from the article 16 of the Constitution which deals with the principle of annuality, which is one device that law says that all entailing changes in the electoral process only comes into force a year later. But we said that this does not apply because there was a change in the electoral process|author=Enrique Ricardo Lewandowski|source=

This guidance told Regional Electoral Courts to apply the Clean Slate Law to the current elections. President of the Supreme Electoral Tribunal and Justice of the Supreme Court Ricardo Lewandowski in his 36-page opinion contended that the Clean Record Act already applied to the 2010 elections and should apply to candidates who were convicted or who resigned to escape impeachment, even before the new rules had come into force. For Lewandowski, the Law of Clean Record put a "filter" on Brazilian politics.

== Evaluation of Supreme Court ==
=== Impasse ===
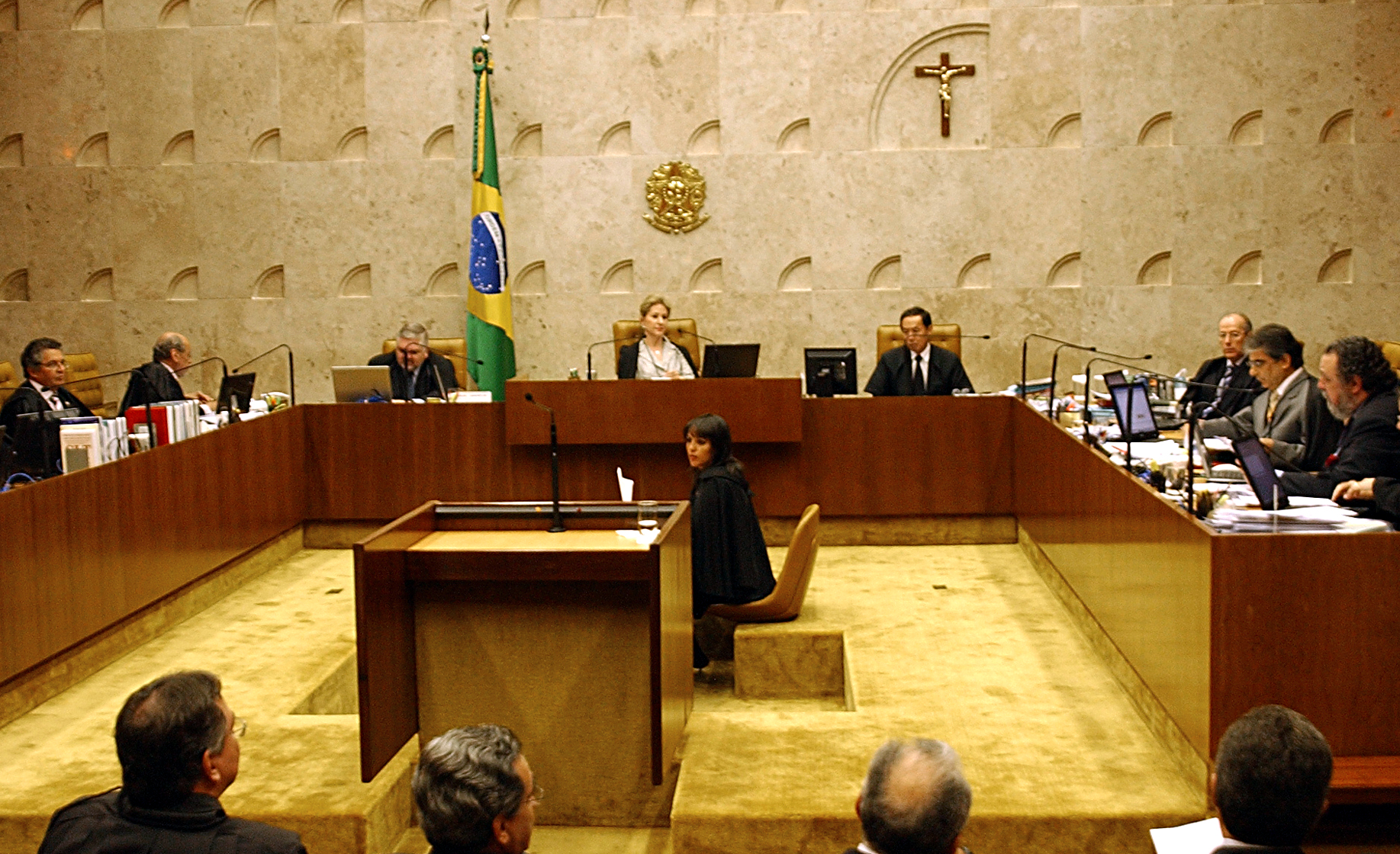
Interior of the building of the Supreme Federal Court building

After the electoral court decision that upheld the bill's validity for the 2010 elections, on account of criticisms made by members of the Supreme Court against the application of the law, such as justices Gilmar Mendes and Marco Aurélio de Melo, several candidates barred by the bill filed legal motions with the federal court, for the right to run for office on the grounds that the law was unconstitutional or not yet effective, since another law bars changes to the electoral process from taking effect on an election year. Those in favour of the bill taking effect that year claimed, among other things, that the law would not change the election process, but only the rules for registration of candidates.

On September 22, less than a month before the election, the justices of the Federal Supreme Court (STF) began the trial of the case of Joaquim Roriz, a former senator who resigned in 2007 to escape a lawsuit for breach of parliamentary decorum. So Roriz, trying to fight the government of the Federal District for the fourth time, had his record challenged by lower courts. The outcome of this trial was important because it would define all other cases in that election. After Justice Carlos Ayres Britto, rapporteur for the case, voted in favour of the law being applied to Roriz, President Cezar Peluso interrupted the proceedings to question the constitutionality of the law. This surprised the other magistrates, and after a standoff, justice Dias Toffoli asked for in-chambers review. The trial resumed the next day, the 23rd, and the vote was tied, with five justices voting in favour and five against. Carlos Ayres Britto, Cármen Lúcia, Joaquim Barbosa, Ricardo Lewandowski and Ellen Gracie voted for constitutionality and Gilmar Mendes, Dias Toffoli, Marco Aurélio Mello, Celso de Mello and Cezar Peluso voted against.

==== Stalemate ====
The court then had ten justices, since justice Eros Grau had retired voluntarily on August 2, 2010, and the position had not yet been filled. Since the full court had an even number of justices and the vote tied at 5-5, intense arguments broke out. Cezar Peluso, the chief justice, chose to suspend judgement without announcing the result. According to O Globo the "expectation is that the justices will return to the issue next Wednesday, four days before the election." The report also noted that possible results, according to the votes cast:

- Ricardo Lewandowski, Carmen Lúcia, Joaquim Barbosa, Ellen Gracie and Carlos Ayres Britto (rapporteur of the case) proposed upholding the TSE decision, i.e. that the Clean Record Act was already in effect;
- Antonio Dias Toffoli, Gilmar Mendes and Marcus Aurelius suggested that the court wait for the appointment of a new justice, and the court decides the vote using the newly named judge casting a vote, or a tie-breaker given by the president. President Cezar Peluso refused to have his vote counted twice, declaring he was not a "despot".

==== Decision ====
The Supreme Federal Court ruled in 2010 that the Clean Record law applies to that year's elections and applied to resigning the political office to escape impeachment process, even in situations that occurred before the law. The trial on the case of Congressman Jader Barbalho, again ended in a draw. Ricardo Lewandowski, Carmen Lúcia, Ellen Gracie, Joaquim Barbosa and Ayres Britto again manifest by the immediate application of the law. Were against Marcus Aurelius, Dias Toffoli, Gilmar Mendes, Celso de Mello and Cezar Peluso. As a tiebreaker, by seven votes to three, it was decided that they would use Article 205 of the by-laws of the Supreme Court which says that "having all justices voted, unless prevented or licensed by the remaining period exceeding three months, the impugned act shall prevail. "well worth the decision of the Superior Electoral Court applicability in the elections of 2010.

==== Setback ====
On March 23, 2011, the validity of the election law was overturned in 2010 6–5 by the Supreme Court. The vote of Justice Luiz Fux - who had succeeded Eros Grau - ruled the law invalid under the constitution. The decision not to apply the law in that election directly benefited several candidates whose eligibility had been barred because of legal actions, such as Jader Barbalho, Joaquim Roriz and João Capiberibe. The Clean Record Act took effect only after the 2012 municipal elections, and was to be applied only if actually passed another vote on its constitutionality.

Even though the law was found to have been applied on a constitutional basis, protests broke out and some politicians such as Senators Marinor Brito, Heloisa Helena and Pedro Simon, who remembered the popular mobilization and society entities for the civil construction of democracy in Brazil, and that the Law of Clean Record was a popular initiative that had over 1.6 million signatures.

I am under the impression that the Supreme Law of the land killed Clean Record.

— Pedro Simon

=== Constitutionality ===
The Order of Attorneys of Brazil (OAB) filed a declaratory action of constitutionality of the law, expected to be tried in the second half of 2011. [28] The trial was suspended from the beginning of November to the 28th due to a request from justice Joaquim Barbosa for in-chambers review. Besides its scope—when it would take effect—the Supreme Court was debating the constitutionality of the provision itself. This discussion was initiated by a lawsuit filed by OAB that tried to resolve any doubt about the constitutionality of the law.

After that two more actions were entered. The three actions were:

- ADC 30, [30] proposed by the Federal Council of the Bar Association of Brazil (CFOAB);
- ADC 29, [31] proposed by the Popular Socialist Party;
- ADI 4578, [32] proposed by the National Confederation of Liberal Professions (CNPL).

They were tried jointly. The plenary session on February 15, 2012, was closed, suspending the trial, scheduled to resume on February 16, 2012 (Thursday). They expressed the parties as follows:

- the Solicitor-General of the Union, Luís Inácio Adams, the attorney general Roberto Gurgel, the national president of the Bar Association of Brazil, Ophir Cavalcante, and the Popular Socialist Party, argued the constitutionality of the law and its applicability to the events that occurred before 2012, when candidates registered for the upcoming municipal elections;
- the National Confederation of Liberal Professions protested against sub-paragraph "m", section I, article 1, the LC 64/90, with the wording given by LC 135/2010, which made ineligible "those who are excluded of the profession, by the penalty decision of the competent professional body, due to ethical and professional infraction for a period of eight (8) years, unless the act there been annulled or suspended by the judiciary."

==== Result ====
On February 16, 2012, the Supreme Court ruled that the law did not violate the Brazilian Constitution and was in force for the 2012 elections and for elections to come.

STF justices voted 7–4 in favour of the law. The affirmative votes were based on the "principle of morality," in the ninth paragraph of Article 14 of the Constitution of Brazil: "conditions of ineligibility to protect the administrative probity, morality for the exercise of mandate, considered the candidate's past life." The four dissenting opinions argued on the basis of the principle of presumption of innocence, in section 57 of Article 5 (an entrenched clause) of the Constitution of Brazil, which says that no one shall be considered guilty until a penal sentence was final and unappealable. The Clean Record Act says that anyone convicted of crime was ineligible for a collective body, even though recourse was still available, would become ineligible. Justices opposed to the constitutionality of the law deemed that section of the legislation unconstitutional. However, justice Ricardo Lewandowski said the presumption of innocence that applies to criminal cases, is not being wide enough to reach the text of the Clean Record.

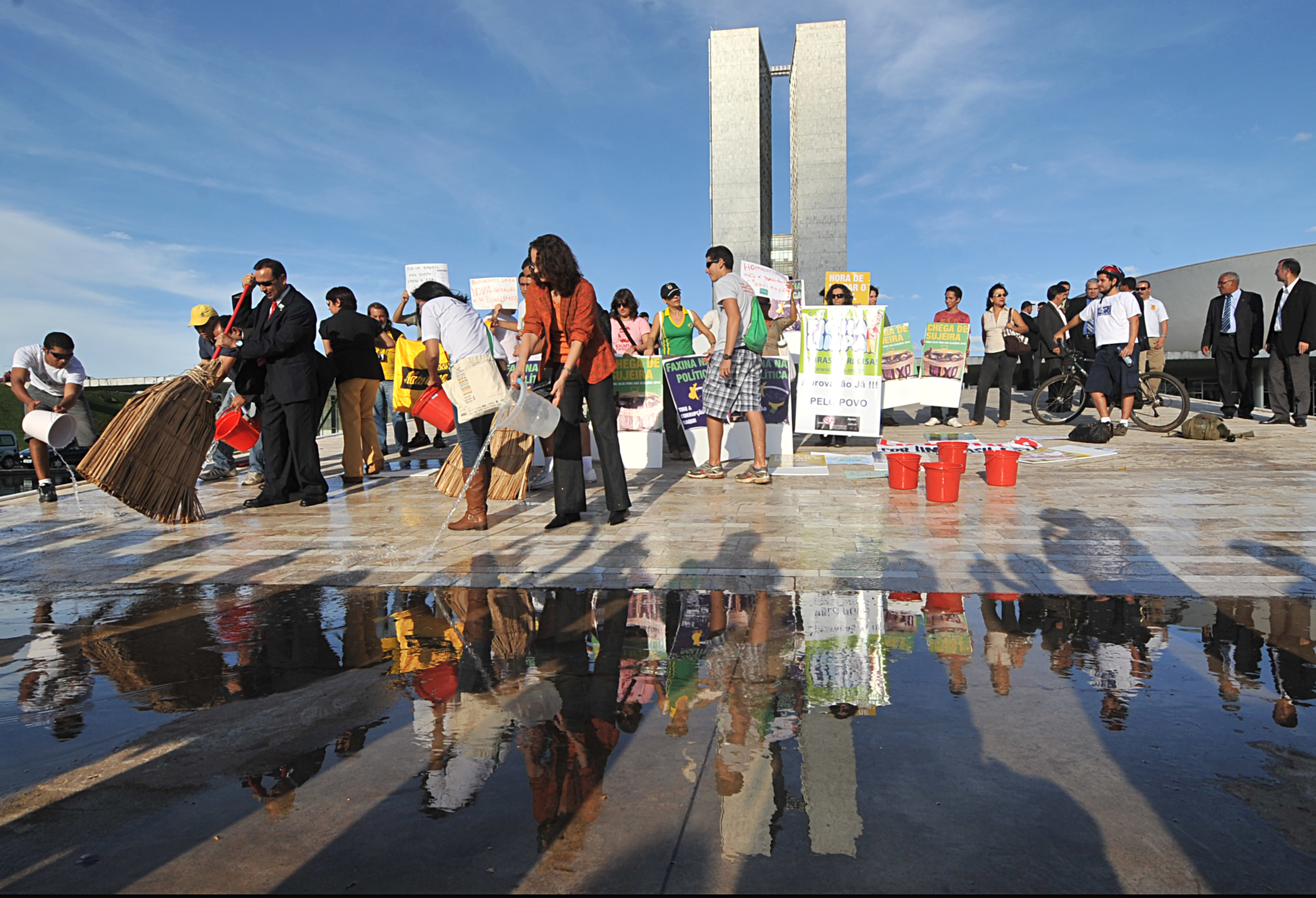
Activists in favor of the law

== Legacy ==
In Novo Hamburgo a law was proposed to prohibit persons, convicted among other offences, of crimes against public faith and popular economy from being appointed to executive positions in the city administration. The city already had a similar law. In Ijuí on March 5, 2012, the Law of Clean Record (Law No. 5586) was enacted by the president of the City Council disciplining appointments in committee and functions gratified in the bodies of the executive and legislative branches.

In 2012 many municipalities are adapting their legislation to implement the Clean Record.

== Ranking of corruption ==
Based on data released by the Superior Electoral Court, the Movement to Combat Electoral Corruption released a balance on 4 October 2007 with the parties that include the largest number of parliamentarians quashed by electoral corruption since 2000. The Brazilian Social Democracy Party appeared in third place on the list with 58 cases, behind only the Democrats and the Brazilian Democratic Movement.

According to analysis released on 8 September 2012, of 317 Brazilian politicians who were barred from running in elections by the Clean Record Act the Brazilian Social Democracy Party is the party that has the largest number of barred candidates with 56 party members.

== Criticism ==
The law provides for the ineligibility of candidates who have been found guilty by courts of account, among other associations, without, however, requiring a final and unappealable conviction. Thus, some argue that the law goes against Article 5 subsection LVII of the Constitution of Brazil, the clause concerning the presumption of innocence. And furthermore, since these courts and entities do not hold the last word in the Brazilian courts, note justice Gilmar Mendes and columnist Reinaldo Azevedo. So could create up several courts with broad discretion in decision outside the legal framework. For instance, courts of accounts that can not pass the bill mayors, who would thus ineligible. Since the appointment of judges of the courts of account is made by state governors, it is feared the political use of state courts account, making ineligible mayors opposing the state government. Moreover, it is feared that the legislation hurts innocent people.

If the individual became ineligible by a board of judges, on appeal, and is cleared later in the Supreme Court or the Superior Court, what happens is that he retrieves his political rights! Now what of the ineligibility, made transient, which prevented him from running? Was it or not the imposition of a penalty to the innocent?

— Reinaldo Azevedo

== Number of candidates barred ==
To this list are considered the number of candidates released by the Senate on record clean before the elections.

Position	State	Region	In 2012	In 2010
	Brazil		(1340)	136
1	Roraima	North	N/A	(?)
1	São Paulo	Southeast	337	(?)
2	Ceará	Northeast	189	(?)
3	Minas Gerais	Southeast	153	16
4	Pernambuco	Northeast	85	3
5	Rio de Janeiro	Southeast	64	10
5	Paraná	South	(64)	3
6	Para	North	45	4
7	Paraíba	Northeast	43	10
8	Tocantins	North	41	1
9	Santa Catarina	South	38	3
10	Mato Grosso	Midwest	35	5
11	Piaui	Northeast	(31)	2
11	Bahia	Northeast	(31)	(?)
12	Maranhão	Northeast	28	(?)
13	Rio Grande do Sul	South	25	5
13	Sergipe	Northeast	25	(?)
14	Rio Grande do Norte	Northeast	23	(?)
15	Amazon	North	19	(?)
16	Mato Grosso do Sul	Midwest	13	3
16	Rondônia	North	13	(?)
17	Goiás	Midwest	(10)	(?)
18	Alagoas	Northeast	7	5
18	Amapá	North	7	1
18	Distrito Federal	Midwest	(7)	1
19	Espirito Santo	Southeast	5	6
20	Acre	North	2	9

Observations in this table:

- The data refer to quantitative accumulated until October 2012;
- "N/A" means that the Regional Electoral Court for the state is not informed about the Act barred by the state's Clean Slate.

== See also ==
- Corruption Perceptions Index
- Corruption in Brazil
- Operation Car Wash
