= ADI 3510 =

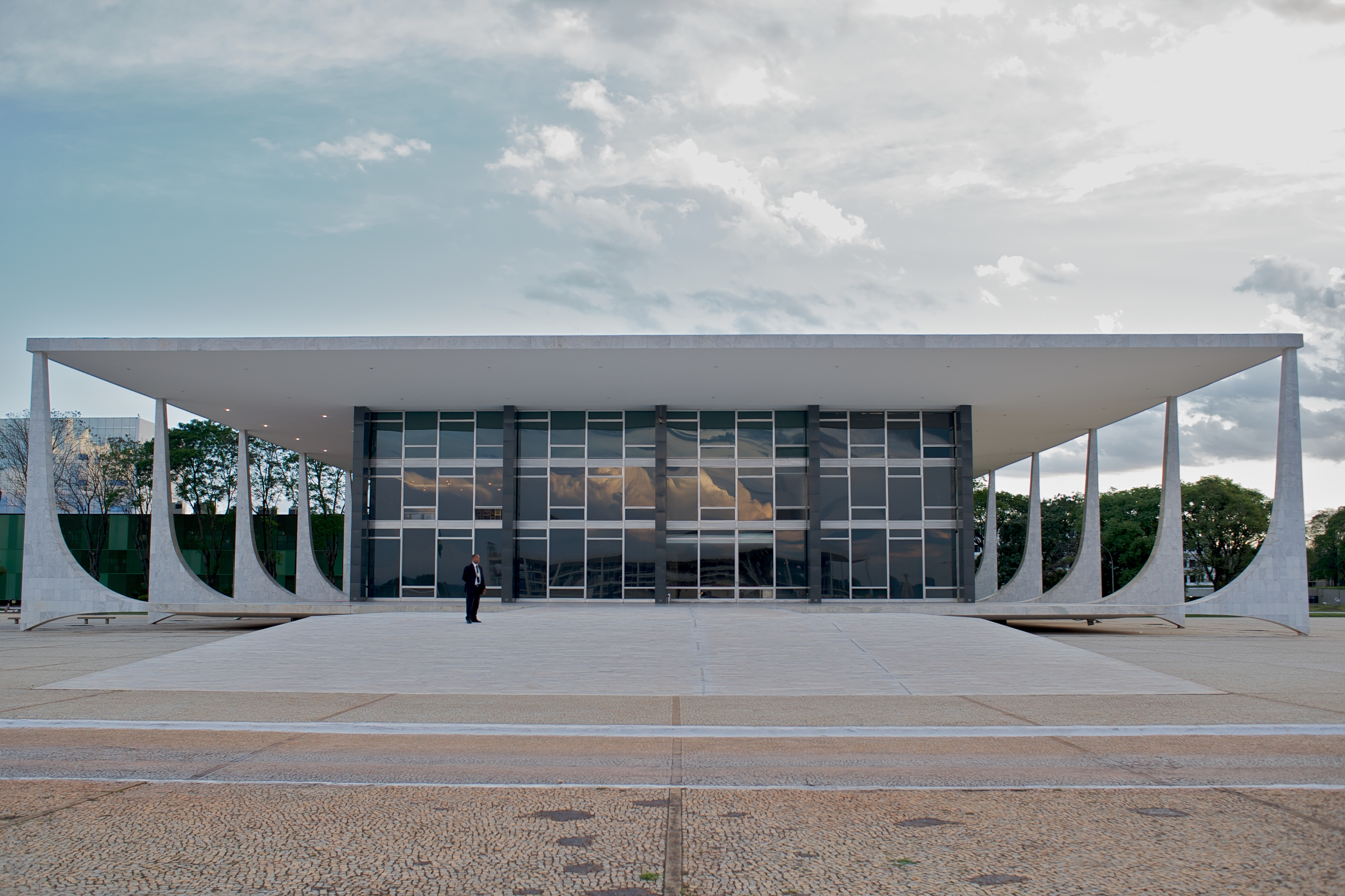
- Court: Supreme Federal Court
- Full case name: ADI 3510 (Prosecutor General v. President of the Republic and National Congress)
- Decided: May 29, 2008
- Citation: Supreme Court of Brazil approved stem cell research using excess in vitro fertilized embryos in the country

Court membership
- Judges sitting: President Gilmar Mendes Justices: Menezes Direito; Marco Aurélio Mello; Cármen Lúcia; Cezar Peluso; Ellen Gracie; Ricardo Lewandowski; Eros Grau; Joaquim Barbosa; Celso de Mello

Case opinions
- Decision by: Britto
- Concurrence: Mello, Lúcia, Gracie, Barbosa, Mello
- Dissent: Direito, Lewandowski, Grau, Peluso, Mendes

Keywords
- Stem cell controversy; Stem cell laws

ADI 3510 (April 29, 2008), is a landmark Brazil Supreme Court case. The minister relator Carlos Ayres Britto voted in favor of embryonic stem cell research (Biosecurity Law).

== High Court decision ==
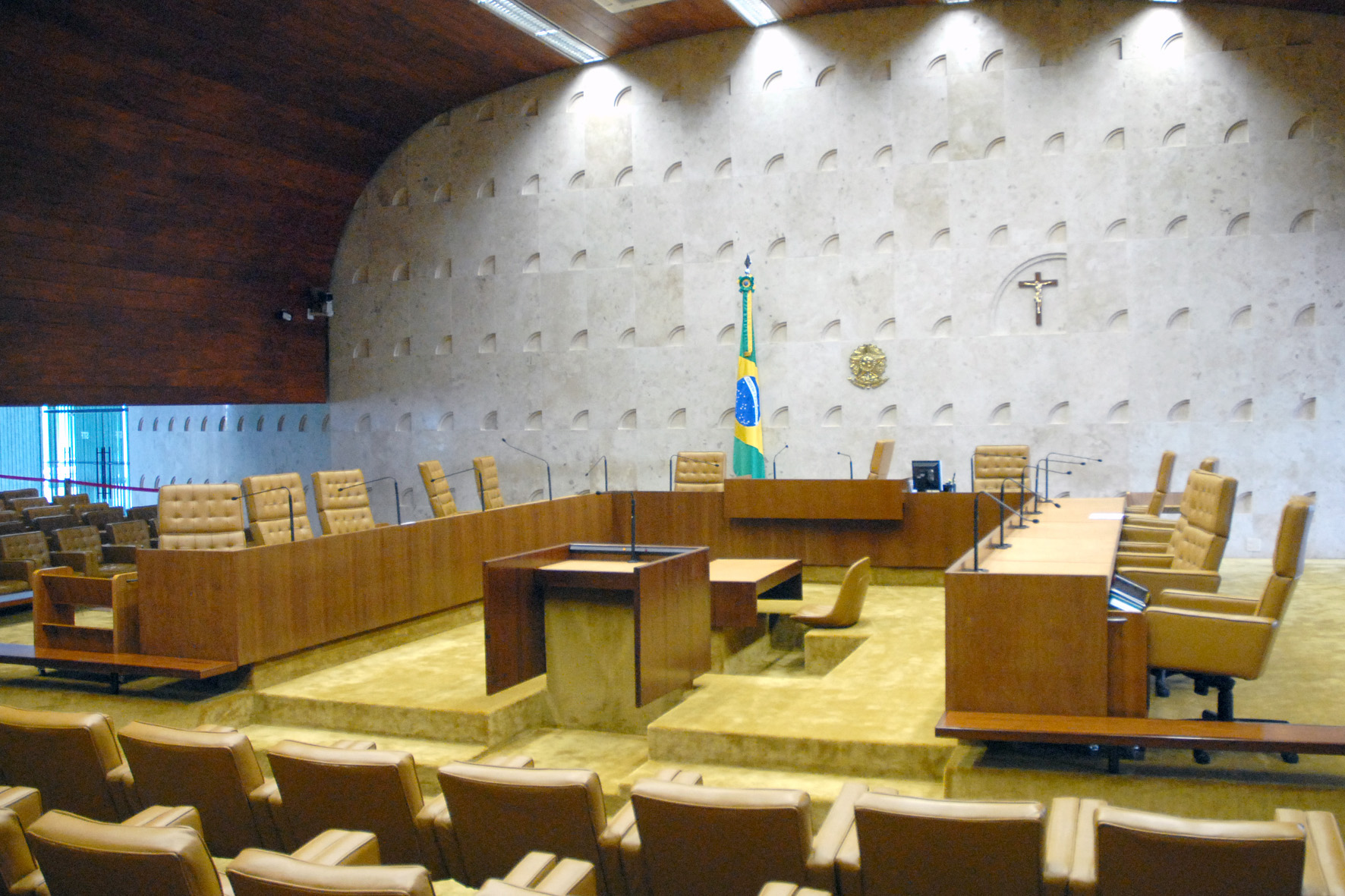
Supreme Court of Brazil.

=== Judiciary representation ===
Supreme Court members	Ministers	Yes	No
Ayres Britto	1		1
Cármen Lúcia	1		1
Celso de Mello	1		1
Cezar Peluso	1	1	
Ellen Gracie	1		1
Eros Grau	1	1	
Gilmar Mendes	1	1	
Joaquim Barbosa	1		1
Marco Aurélio Mello	1		1
Menezes Direito	1	1	
Ricardo Lewandowski	1	1	
Total	11	5	6

=== Legislative representation ===
Prosecutor General of the Republic	Prosecutor	Yes	No
Antônio Fernando de Souza	1	1	
Total	1	1	0

=== Executive representation ===
Attorney General of the Union	Solicitor General	Yes	No
Dias Toffoli	1		1
Total	1	0	1

== See also ==
- Stem cell laws
- Stem cell research
- Stem cell
