= ADPF 153 =

Landmark case of the Supreme Court of Brazil

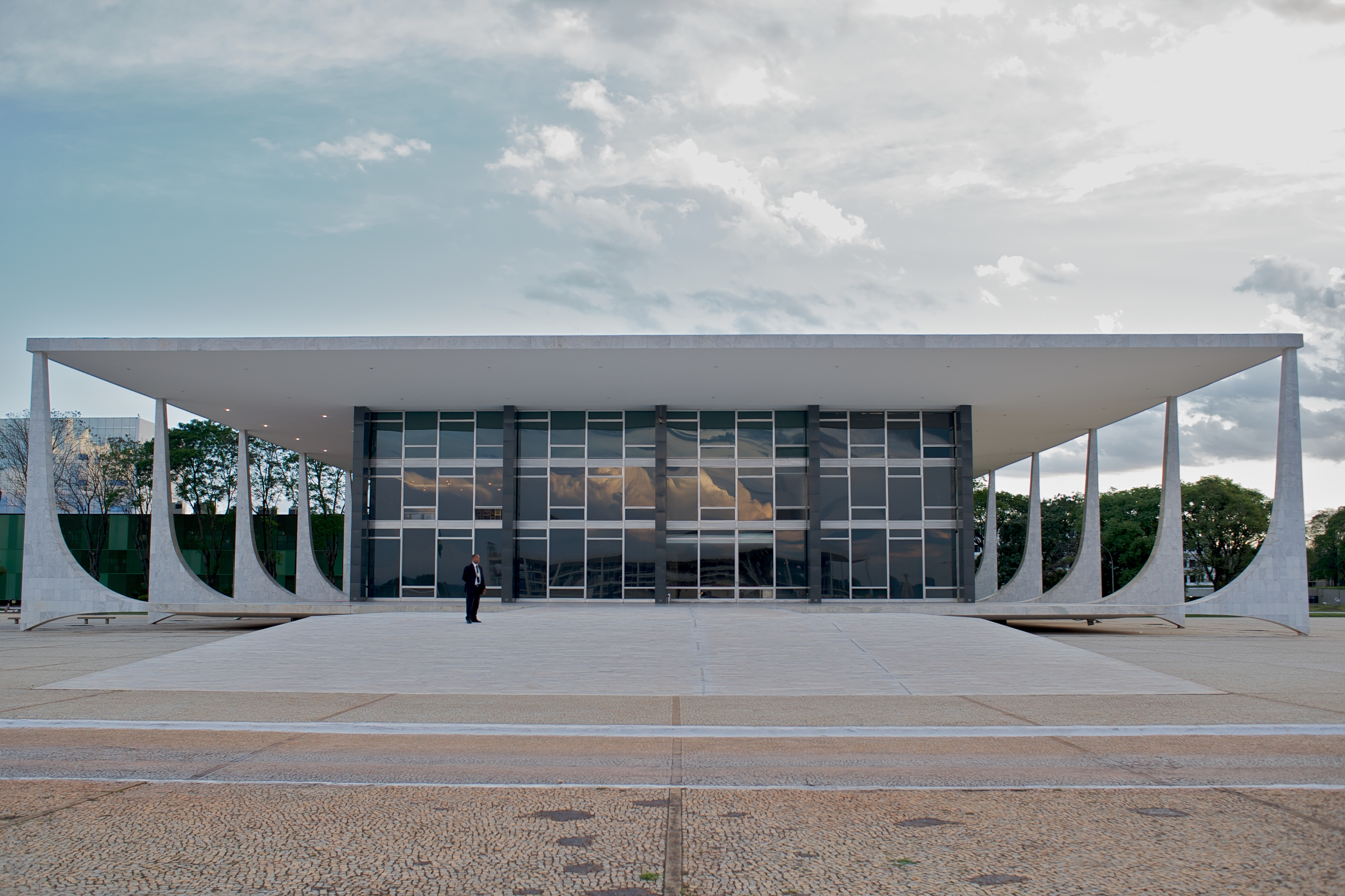
- Court: Supreme Federal Court
- Full case name: ADPF 153 (Federal Council of the Order of Attorneys of Brazil v. President of the Republic)
- Decided: 29 April 2010
- Citation: ADPF 153

Court membership
- Judges sitting: President Cezar Peluso Justices: Celso de Mello; Marco Aurélio; Ellen Gracie; Gilmar Mendes; Ayres Britto; Eros Grau; Ricardo Lewandowski; Cármen Lúcia; Dias Toffoli

Case opinions
- Decision by: Grau
- Concurrence: Peluzo, Mello, Aurélio, Mendes, Lúcia and Gracie
- Dissent: Britto and Lewandowski

Keywords
- Amnesty; Military dictatorship in Brazil

ADPF 153 was a constitutional review case ruled by the Brazilian Supreme Federal Court, which the Order of Attorneys of Brazil (OAB) requested the acknowledgment of the unconstitutionality of the Amnesty Law. Ruled in April 2010, the Supreme Court considered the case unfounded in a voting of 7 to 2.

== History ==
ADPF 153 document, ruled by rapporteur Justice Eros Grau

In the collapse of the military dictatorship in Brazil, the government passed an amnesty in August 1979 which exempted from any penalties and eventual sanction all the political and related crimes occurred in Brazil from September 1961 to 15 August 1979. "Related crimes", according to the single paragraph of the first article of the law, were "crimes of any nature related with political crimes or committed with political motivation". The Order then requested a clarification of this excerpt, averting the amnesty of common crimes committed by public agents, such as murder, enforced disappearance and torture of their opponents.

Then Prosecutor General of the Republic, Roberto Gurgel, manifested against the request. In a two-day trial in April 2010, six justices concurred with justice Eros Grau to reject the appeal. According to him, the Supreme Court couldn't review the "historical agreement that permeated the fight for a broad, general and unrestricted amnesty".

Later on, the Inter-American Court of Human Rights ruled, in the Gomes Lund vs. Brazil case, that the amnesty was not in compliance with the international obligations of the Brazilian State ratified with the American Convention on Human Rights. Due to this, the Socialism and Liberty Party (PSOL) filed another appeal (ADPF 320), aiming to repeal the amnesty.

== High Court decision ==
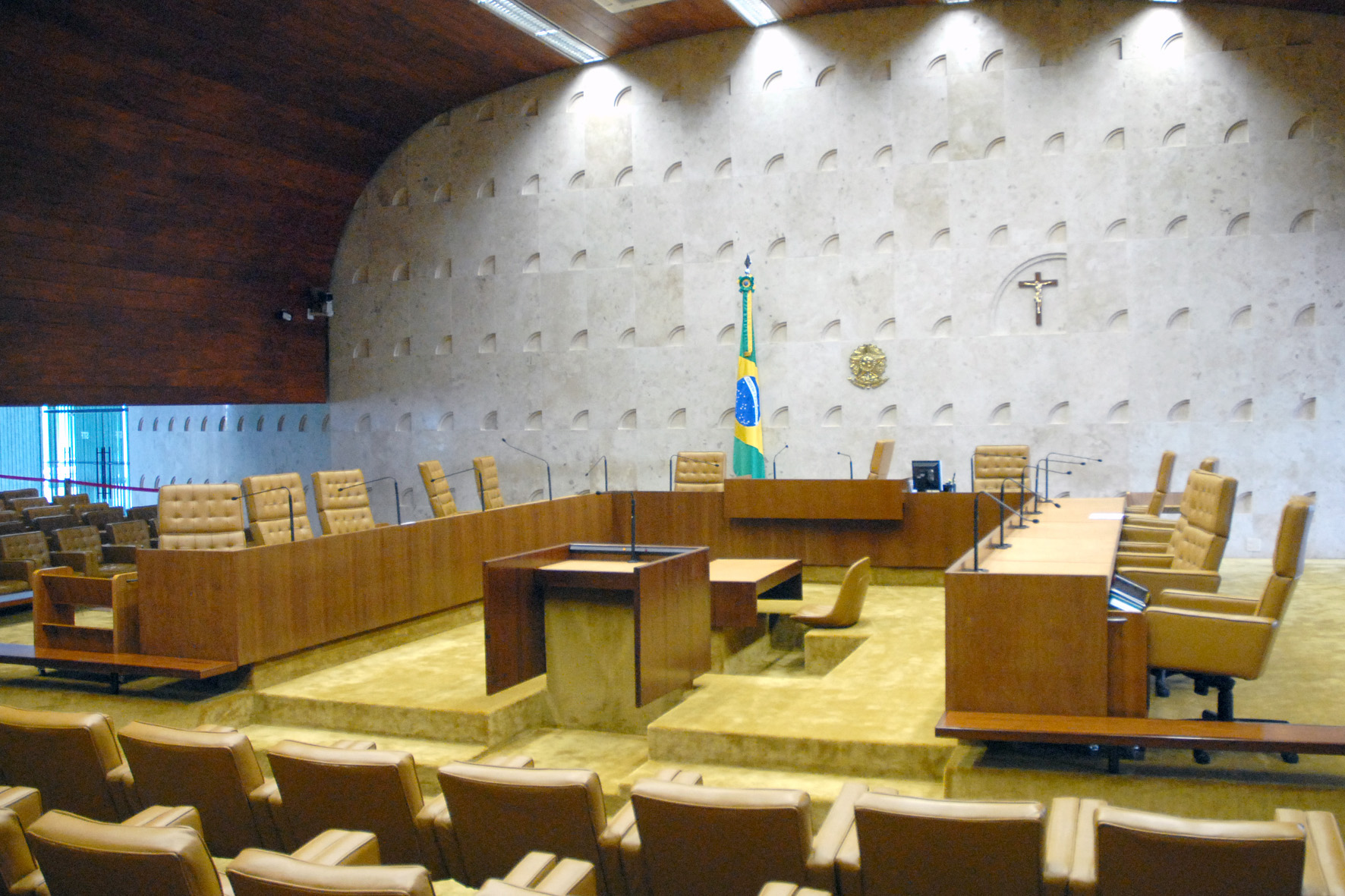
Supreme Court of Brazil.

=== Judiciary representation ===
Supreme Court members	Ministers	Yes	No
Ayres Britto	1	1	
Cármen Lúcia	1		1
Celso de Mello	1		1
Cezar Peluso	1		1
Gilmar Mendes	1		1
Marco Aurélio Mello	1		1
Ellen Gracie	1		1
Eros Grau	1		1
Ricardo Lewandowski	1	1	
Total	9	02	07

=== Public Prosecutor's Office representation ===
Prosecutor General	Prosecutor	Yes	No
Roberto Gurgel	1		1
Total	1	0	1
