= President of the Supreme Federal Court =

Highest-ranking officer of the Brazilian judiciary

The President of the Supreme Federal Court is the highest-ranking officer of the Brazilian judiciary branch. The holder is also president of the National Council of Justice (CNJ). Among their responsibilities are representing both the Court and the council before other branches of government and authorities, presiding over plenary sessions of both institutions, enforcing the bylaws of the Court and Council, deciding points of order in their respective sessions, making decisions on injunctions during recess or vacation, and swearing in justices of the Supreme Court and councillors of the CNJ. The President of the Supreme Federal Court is fourth in the Brazilian presidential line of succession and presides all impeachment trials at the federal level. (Note: While this would imply that the President of the Supreme Federal Court would preside over their own impeachment trial, the effective result is that at this point, they would have been suspended from their duties, and the Vice President of the Court would preside instead.)

The President and Vice President of the Supreme Court are elected by their peers through a secret ballot, requiring a minimum quorum of eight justices. The election follows a two-round system, and the offices are held for a single, non-renewable two-year term. For most of Brazil’s republican history, the process has followed a tradition of rotation: the most senior justice who has not yet served becomes President, and the second-most senior is elected Vice President. This practice is not established by law but upheld as a long-standing custom of the Court.

The self-governance and self-determination of the Supreme Federal Court regarding the choice of its president did not exist in two historical periods. During the monarchy, the Emperor of Brazil appointed the President of the Supreme Court of Justice for a renewable three-year term. Under the Constitution of 1937, the President of Brazil appointed the President of the Court from among the justices of the current composition for an indefinite term.

The longest presidency was held by Hermínio do Espírito Santo for 13 years and 312 days, while the shortest was held by Leoni Ramos for 23 days. The current President is Justice Edson Fachin, who has held the position since 29 September 2025.

== Presidents of the Supreme Court of Justice (1829–1891) ==
No.	Portrait	Justice	Took office	Left office	Time in office	Appointer
1	José Albano Fragoso	José Albano Fragoso (1768–1843)	8 January 1829	5 January 1832	2 years, 362 days	Pedro I
2	Lucas Antônio Monteiro de Barros, Viscount of Congonhas do Campo	Lucas Antônio Monteiro de Barros, Viscount of Congonhas do Campo (1767–1851)	5 January 1832	3 March 1842	10 years, 57 days	Permanent Triumviral Regency
3	José Bernardo de Figueiredo	José Bernardo de Figueiredo (1769–1854)	26 April 1842	13 October 1849	7 years, 170 days	Pedro II
4	Francisco de Paula Pereira Duarte	Francisco de Paula Pereira Duarte (1784–1855)	17 October 1849	15 June 1855	5 years, 241 days	Pedro II
5	Manuel Pinto Ribeiro Pereira de Sampaio	Manuel Pinto Ribeiro Pereira de Sampaio (1780–1857)	15 February 1856	27 September 1857	1 year, 224 days	Pedro II
6	Joaquim José Pinheiro de Vasconcelos, Viscount of Monserrate	Joaquim José Pinheiro de Vasconcelos, Viscount of Monserrate (1799–1879)	27 September 1857	5 February 1864	6 years, 131 days	Pedro II
7	Joaquim Marcelino de Brito	Joaquim Marcelino de Brito (1799–1879)	5 February 1864	27 January 1879	14 years, 356 days	Pedro II
8	João Antônio de Vasconcelos	João Antônio de Vasconcelos (1802–1880)	1 February 1879	21 November 1880	1 year, 294 days	Pedro II
9	Albino José Barbosa de Oliveira	Albino José Barbosa de Oliveira (1809–1889)	27 November 1880	14 June 1882	1 year, 199 days	Pedro II
10	Manuel de Jesus Valdetaro, Viscount of Valdetaro	Manuel de Jesus Valdetaro, Viscount of Valdetaro (1807–1897)	14 June 1882	27 November 1886	4 years, 166 days	Pedro II
11	João Evangelista de Negreiros, Viscount of Sabará	João Evangelista de Negreiros, Viscount of Sabará (1817–1894)	27 November 1886	26 February 1891	4 years, 91 days	Pedro II

== Presidents of the Supreme Federal Court (1891–present) ==
No.	Portrait	Justice	Took office	Left office	Time in office	Appointer
1	Freitas Henriques	Freitas Henriques (1822–1903)	28 February 1891	9 February 1894	2 years, 346 days	Deodoro da Fonseca (Ind)
2	Aquino e Castro	Aquino e Castro (1828–1906)	28 February 1894	10 August 1906	12 years, 163 days	Deodoro da Fonseca (Ind)
3	Piza e Almeida	Piza e Almeida (1842–1908)	18 August 1906	22 April 1908	1 year, 248 days	Deodoro da Fonseca (Ind)
4	Pindaíba de Matos	Pindaíba de Matos (1831–1913)	29 April 1908	26 December 1910	2 years, 241 days	Floriano Peixoto (Ind)
5	Hermínio do Espírito Santo	Hermínio do Espírito Santo (1842–1924)	4 January 1911	11 November 1924	13 years, 312 days	Floriano Peixoto (Ind)
6	André Cavalcanti	André Cavalcanti (1834–1927)	14 November 1924	13 February 1927	2 years, 91 days	Prudente de Morais (PR Federal)
7	Godofredo Cunha	Godofredo Cunha (1860–1936)	22 February 1927	17 February 1931	3 years, 360 days	Nilo Peçanha (PRF)
8	Leoni Ramos	Leoni Ramos (1857–1931)	25 February 1931	20 March 1931	23 days	Nilo Peçanha (PRF)
9	Edmundo Lins	Edmundo Lins (1863–1944)	1 April 1931	15 November 1937	6 years, 228 days	Venceslau Brás (PRM)
10	Bento de Faria	Bento de Faria (1876–1959)	19 November 1937	18 November 1940	2 years, 365 days	Artur Bernardes (PRM)
11	Eduardo Espínola	Eduardo Espínola (1875–1968)	20 November 1940	24 May 1945	4 years, 185 days	Getúlio Vargas (Ind)
12	José Linhares	José Linhares (1886–1957)	26 May 1945	31 January 1949	3 years, 250 days	Getúlio Vargas (Ind)
13	Laudo de Camargo	Laudo de Camargo (1881–1963)	31 January 1949	24 April 1951	2 years, 83 days	Getúlio Vargas (Ind)
14	José Linhares	José Linhares (1886–1957)	2 May 1951	30 January 1956	4 years, 273 days	Getúlio Vargas (Ind)
15	Orozimbo Nonato	Orozimbo Nonato (1891–1974)	30 January 1956	26 January 1960	3 years, 361 days	Getúlio Vargas (Ind)
16	Barros Barreto	Barros Barreto (1895–1969)	29 January 1960	28 January 1962	1 year, 364 days	Getúlio Vargas (Ind)
17	Lafayette de Andrada	Lafayette de Andrada (1900–1974)	29 January 1962	10 December 1963	1 year, 315 days	José Linhares (Ind)
18	Ribeiro da Costa	Ribeiro da Costa (1897–1967)	11 December 1963	4 December 1966	2 years, 358 days	José Linhares (Ind)
19	Luís Gallotti	Luís Gallotti (1904–1978)	14 December 1966	11 December 1968	1 year, 363 days	Eurico Gaspar Dutra (PSD)
20	Gonçalves de Oliveira	Gonçalves de Oliveira (1910–1992)	11 December 1968	18 January 1969	38 days	Juscelino Kubitschek (PSD)
–	Luís Gallotti	Luís Gallotti (1904–1978); Acting	18 January 1969	10 February 1969	23 days	Eurico Gaspar Dutra (PSD)
21	Oswaldo Trigueiro	Oswaldo Trigueiro (1905–1989)	10 February 1969	10 February 1971	2 years, 0 days	Castelo Branco (ARENA)
22	Aliomar Baleeiro	Aliomar Baleeiro (1905–1978)	10 February 1971	9 February 1973	1 year, 365 days	Castelo Branco (ARENA)
23	Elói da Rocha	Elói da Rocha (1907–1999)	9 February 1973	14 February 1975	2 years, 5 days	Castelo Branco (ARENA)
24	Djaci Falcão	Djaci Falcão (1919–2012)	14 February 1975	14 February 1977	2 years, 0 days	Castelo Branco (ARENA)
25	Thompson Flores	Thompson Flores (1911–2001)	14 February 1977	14 February 1979	2 years, 0 days	Costa e Silva (ARENA)
26	Antônio Neder	Antônio Neder (1911–2003)	14 February 1979	16 February 1981	2 years, 2 days	Emílio Garrastazu Médici (ARENA)
27	Xavier de Albuquerque	Xavier de Albuquerque (1926–2015)	16 February 1981	21 February 1983	2 years, 5 days	Emílio Garrastazu Médici (ARENA)
28	Cordeiro Guerra	Cordeiro Guerra (1916–1993)	21 February 1983	25 February 1985	2 years, 4 days	Ernesto Geisel (ARENA)
29	Moreira Alves	Moreira Alves (1933–2023)	25 February 1985	2 March 1987	2 years, 5 days	Ernesto Geisel (ARENA)
30	Rafael Mayer	Rafael Mayer (1919–2013)	2 March 1987	14 March 1989	2 years, 12 days	Ernesto Geisel (ARENA)
31	Néri da Silveira	Néri da Silveira (born 1932)	14 March 1989	14 March 1991	2 years, 0 days	João Figueiredo (PDS)
32	Aldir Passarinho	Aldir Passarinho (1921–2014)	14 March 1991	22 April 1991	39 days	João Figueiredo (PDS)
33	Sydney Sanches	Sydney Sanches (born 1933)	10 May 1991	13 May 1993	2 years, 3 days	João Figueiredo (PDS)
34	Octavio Gallotti	Octavio Gallotti (1930–2026)	13 May 1993	17 May 1995	2 years, 4 days	João Figueiredo (PDS)
35	Sepúlveda Pertence	Sepúlveda Pertence (1937–2023)	17 May 1995	20 May 1997	1 year, 307 days	José Sarney (MDB)
36	Celso de Mello	Celso de Mello (born 1945)	22 May 1997	27 May 1999	2 years, 5 days	José Sarney (MDB)
37	Carlos Velloso	Carlos Velloso (born 1936)	27 May 1999	31 May 2001	2 years, 4 days	Fernando Collor (PRN)
38	Marco Aurélio Mello	Marco Aurélio Mello (born 1946)	31 May 2001	5 June 2003	2 years, 5 days	Fernando Collor (PRN)
39	Maurício Corrêa	Maurício Corrêa (1934–2012)	5 June 2003	8 August 2004	1 year, 64 days	Itamar Franco (MDB)
40	Nelson Jobim	Nelson Jobim (born 1946)	20 August 2004	29 March 2006	1 year, 221 days	Fernando Henrique Cardoso (PSDB)
41	Ellen Gracie	Ellen Gracie (born 1948)	27 April 2006	23 April 2008	1 year, 362 days	Fernando Henrique Cardoso (PSDB)
42	Gilmar Mendes	Gilmar Mendes (born 1955)	23 April 2008	23 April 2010	2 years, 0 days	Fernando Henrique Cardoso (PSDB)
43	Cezar Peluso	Cezar Peluso (born 1942)	23 April 2010	19 April 2012	1 year, 362 days	Luiz Inácio Lula da Silva (PT)
44	Ayres Britto	Ayres Britto (born 1942)	19 April 2012	17 November 2012	212 days	Luiz Inácio Lula da Silva (PT)
45	Joaquim Barbosa	Joaquim Barbosa (born 1954)	22 November 2012	31 July 2014	1 year, 251 days	Luiz Inácio Lula da Silva (PT)
46	Ricardo Lewandowski	Ricardo Lewandowski (born 1948)	10 September 2014	12 September 2016	2 years, 2 days	Luiz Inácio Lula da Silva (PT)
47	Cármen Lúcia	Cármen Lúcia (born 1954)	12 September 2016	13 September 2018	2 years, 1 day	Luiz Inácio Lula da Silva (PT)
48	Dias Toffoli	Dias Toffoli (born 1967)	13 September 2018	10 September 2020	1 year, 363 days	Luiz Inácio Lula da Silva (PT)
49	Luiz Fux	Luiz Fux (born 1953)	10 September 2020	12 September 2022	2 years, 2 days	Dilma Rousseff (PT)
50	Rosa Weber	Rosa Weber (born 1948)	12 September 2022	28 September 2023	1 year, 16 days	Dilma Rousseff (PT)
51	Luís Roberto Barroso	Luís Roberto Barroso (born 1958)	28 September 2023	29 September 2025	2 years, 1 day	Dilma Rousseff (PT)
52	Edson Fachin	Edson Fachin (born 1958)	29 September 2025	Incumbent	301 days	Dilma Rousseff (PT)
