= Ricardo Lewandowski =

Brazilian judge and politician (born 1948)

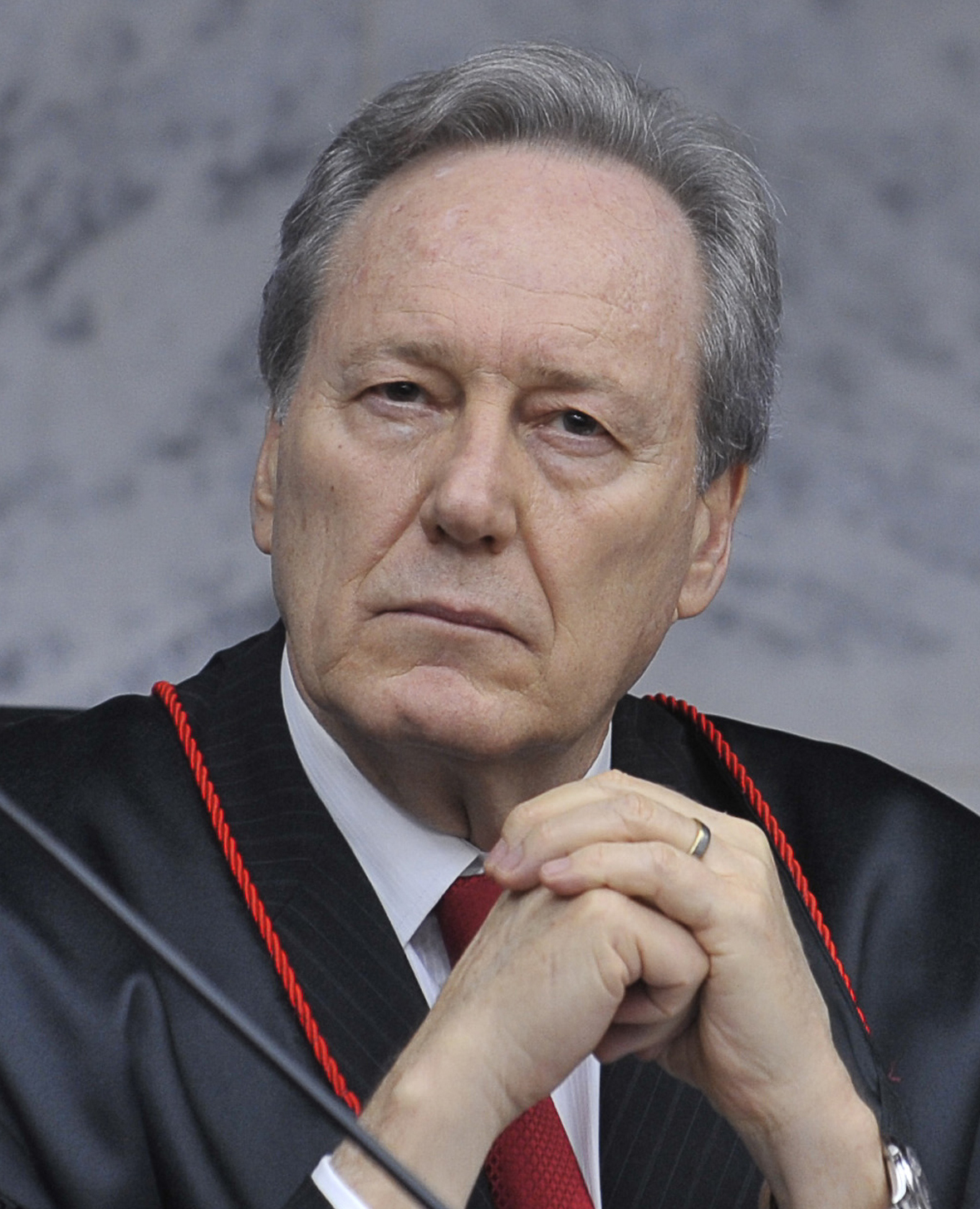
- Lewandowski in 2011

Minister of Justice and Public Security
- In office 1 February 2024 – 9 January 2026
- President: Luiz Inácio Lula da Silva
- Preceded by: Flávio Dino
- Succeeded by: Wellington Lima e Silva

Justice of the Supreme Federal Court
- In office 16 March 2006 – 11 April 2023
- Appointed by: Luiz Inácio Lula da Silva
- Preceded by: Carlos Velloso
- Succeeded by: Cristiano Zanin

President of the Supreme Federal Court
- In office 10 September 2014 – 12 September 2016
- Vice President: Cármen Lúcia
- Preceded by: Joaquim Barbosa
- Succeeded by: Cármen Lúcia

Personal details
- Born: Enrique Ricardo Lewandowski; 11 May 1948 (age 78) Rio de Janeiro, Brazil
- Spouse: Yara de Abreu
- Education: Faculty of Law of São Bernardo do Campo; University of São Paulo; Tufts University
- Other judicial positions: 2014–2016: President, National Justice Council; 2012–2014: Vice President, Supreme Federal Court; 2012–2014: Vice President, National Justice Council; 2010–2012: President, Superior Electoral Court; 2009–2010: Vice President, Superior Electoral Court; 2008–2012: Effective Justice, Superior Electoral Court; 2006–2008: Substitute Justice, Superior Electoral Court

Enrique Ricardo Lewandowski (Portuguese pronunciation: [ẽˈʁiki ʁiˈkaʁdu lɛvɐ̃ ˈdɔvski]; born 11 May 1948) is a Brazilian politician who served as the Minister of Justice under the government of President Luiz Inácio Lula da Silva. He is a former judge and retired justice of the Supreme Federal Court of Brazil.

== Career ==
He is the son of a Polish father and Swiss mother, who immigrated to Brazil after the Second World War.

Lewandowski was replaced by Cármen Lúcia who was championed by Celso de Mello, Brazil's most senior jurist. Lewandowski was known for championing a reduction in oversight of judges and an increase in their remuneration. Lucia's champion gave a speech talking about the need to remove corruption despite the presence of a number of alleged suspects.

On 10 January 2024, Lewandowski accepted president Lula da Silva's invitation to replace outgoing minister Flávio Dino in the Ministry of Justice and Public Security.

== Publications ==
- Proteção dos Direitos Humanos na Ordem Interna e Internacional. Rio de Janeiro: Forense, 1984.
- Pressupostos Materiais e Formais da Intervenção Federal no Brasil. São Paulo: Ed. Revista dos Tribunais, 1994.
- Direito Comunitário e Jurisdição Supranacional: o papel do juiz no processo de integração regional (ed.). São Paulo: Ed. Juarez de Oliveira, 2000.
- Globalização, Regionalização e Soberania. São Paulo: Juarez de Oliveira, 2004.
- A influência de Dalmo Dallari nas decisões dos tribunais (ed.). São Paulo: Saraiva, 2011.

Legal offices
Preceded by Carlos Velloso	Justice of the Supreme Federal Court; 2006–2023	Succeeded by Cristiano Zanin
Preceded by Ayres Britto	President of the Superior Electoral Court; 2010–2012	Succeeded by Cármen Lúcia
Preceded by Joaquim Barbosa	President of the Supreme Federal Court; 2014–2016	Succeeded by Cármen Lúcia
Political offices
Preceded by Flávio Dino	Minister of Justice and Public Security; 2024–2026	Succeeded by Wellington Lima e Silva
