= Cármen Lúcia =

Brazilian judge (1954)

Her Excellency Cármen Lúcia
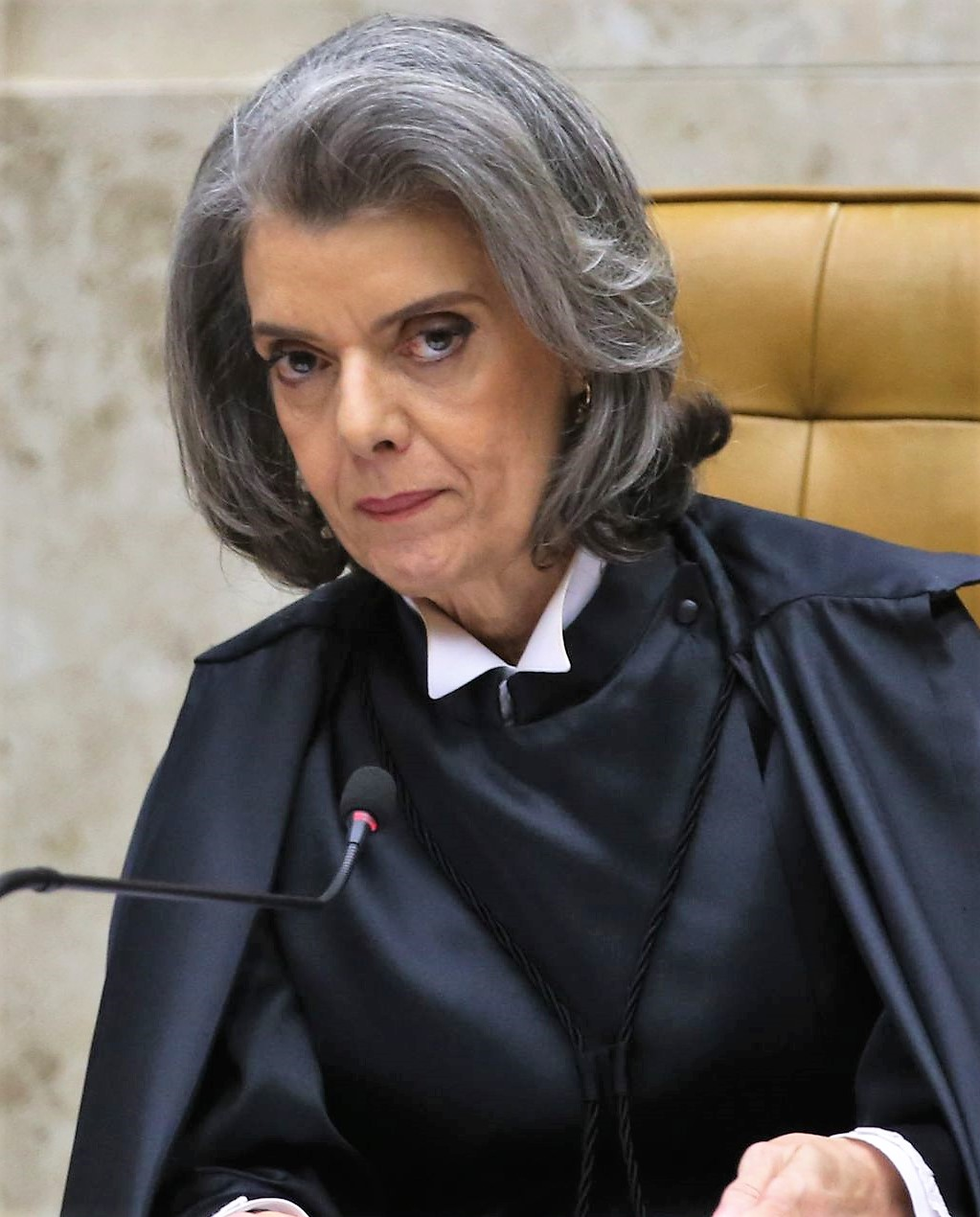

Justice of the Supreme Federal Court
- Incumbent
- Assumed office 21 June 2006
- Nominated by: Luiz Inácio Lula da Silva
- Preceded by: Nelson Jobim

President of the Supreme Federal Court
- In office 12 September 2016 – 13 September 2018
- Vice President: Dias Toffoli
- Preceded by: Ricardo Lewandowski
- Succeeded by: Dias Toffoli

President of the Superior Electoral Court
- Incumbent
- Assumed office 3 June 2024
- Vice President: Nunes Marques
- Preceded by: Alexandre de Moraes

Personal details
- Born: 19 April 1954 (age 72) Montes Claros, Minas Gerais, Brazil
- Education: Pontifical Catholic University of Minas Gerais
- Reference(s)
- Other judicial positions: 2016–2018: President, National Justice Council; 2014–2016: Vice President, Supreme Federal Court; 2014–2016: Vice President, National Justice Council; 2012–2013: President, Superior Electoral Court; 2010–2012: Vice President, Superior Electoral Court; 2008–2013: Effective Justice, Superior Electoral Court; 2006–2008: Substitute Justice, Superior Electoral Court

Cármen Lúcia Antunes Rocha (Portuguese pronunciation: [ˈkaʁmẽj ˈlusjɐ ɐ̃ˈtuniz ˈʁɔʃɐ]; 19 April 1954) is a Brazilian jurist and member of the Supreme Federal Court since 2006. She is the second woman to have been chosen as a justice for the Court and Chief Justice and a professor of Constitutional Law at Pontifical Catholic University of Minas Gerais. She was nominated by former President of Brazil Luiz Inácio Lula da Silva. Antunes Rocha's work has been marked by the rigor with which she tries corruption cases and her firm stance regarding women's rights.

She is currently the President of the Superior Electoral Court of Brazil. She was the President of the Supreme Federal Court. She became Acting President from April 13, 2018, until April 14 of the same year, as President Michel Temer attended the VIII Summit of the Americas, and the president of the Chamber of Deputies, Rodrigo Maia, and the president of the Senate, Eunício Oliveira were outside Brazil.

At her introduction to the role she was championed by José Celso de Mello Filho, the most senior justice of the court. Lucia replaced Ricardo Lewandowski who had been known for championing a reduction in oversight and an increase in remuneration for judges. Her champion gave a speech talking about the need to remove corruption, although the event had presence of a number of alleged suspects. In 2018, the minister Dias Toffoli succeeded Carmen Lúcia as president of the Court.

== Supreme Federal Court ==
She was nominated by then-President Luiz Inácio Lula da Silva for the position of Justice of the Supreme Federal Court, filling the vacancy left by Justice Nelson Jobim, who retired on May 26, 2006.

In the Federal Senate, she was considered an excellent phrase-maker. During her confirmation hearing, Lúcia stated: "When they find me, not even in death will they see me with my arms crossed, in the face of what has been my struggle for us to have a just Brazil." Her nomination was approved by the Senate by 55 votes to 1 on May 24, 2006.

=== Mensalão scandal ===
In October 2012, during the trial that convicted José Dirceu, Marcos Valério, and 23 others, Lúcia voted to acquit 13 defendants accused of conspiracy in the Mensalão scandal. Her vote for acquittal was criticized by then-Supreme Court Justice Joaquim Barbosa.

=== Prisons ===
==== Natan Donadon ====
In June 2013, Lúcia issued an arrest warrant for Congressman Natan Donadon (PMDB-RO), who was sentenced to 13 years, 4 months, and 10 days in prison, initially under a closed regime, for the crimes of conspiracy and embezzlement. Lúcia was the rapporteur for the case. With the Supreme Court's decision, Donadon was sentenced not only to prison but also to the loss of his political rights.

==== Delcídio do Amaral ====
In November 2015, Lúcia voted in favor of the arrest of then-Senator Delcídio do Amaral, at the time the leader of the government of former President Dilma Rousseff. It was the first time in history that a sitting senator was arrested in Brazil, and the reading of her vote became symbolic of the event. In it, Lúcia makes a statement in favor of do Amaral's arrest, comparing "the overcoming of hope over fear"—a motto of the Workers' Party's political campaign for the election of Luiz Inácio Lula da Silva as president of the republic—to the Mensalão scandal, and the mockery of believing that immunity is synonymous with impunity.

Legal offices
Preceded by Nelson Jobim	Justice of the Supreme Federal Court; 2006–present	Incumbent
Preceded by Ricardo Lewandowski	President of the Supreme Federal Court; 2016–2018	Succeeded by Dias Toffoli
Preceded by Ricardo Lewandowski	President of the Superior Electoral Court; 2012–2013	Succeeded by Marco Aurélio Mello
Preceded by Alexandre de Moraes	President of the Superior Electoral Court; 2024–present	Incumbent
Order of precedence
Preceded by Foreign ambassadors	Brazilian order of precedence 15th in line as President of the Superior Electoral Court	Followed by Justices of the Supreme Federal Court
