= Moreira Alves =

Brazilian magistrate (1933–2023)

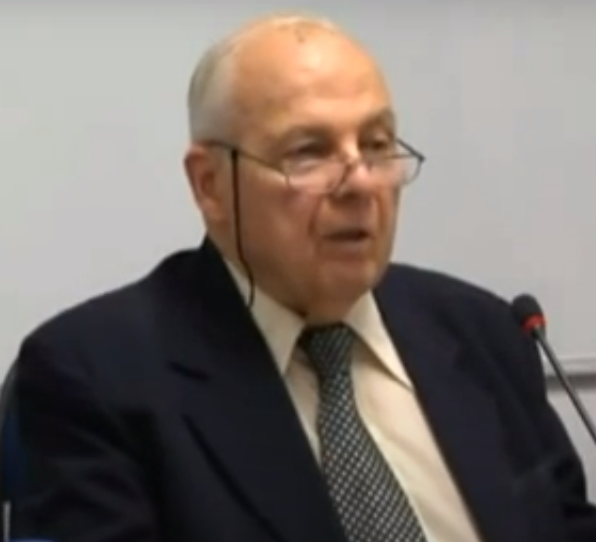
- Alves in 2012

Justice of the Supreme Federal Court
- In office 20 June 1975 – 20 April 2003
- Nominated by: Ernesto Geisel
- Preceded by: Osvaldo Trigueiro
- Succeeded by: Joaquim Barbosa

President of the Supreme Federal Court
- In office 25 February 1985 – 2 March 1987
- Preceded by: Cordeiro Guerra
- Succeeded by: Rafael Mayer

Prosecutor General of the Republic
- In office 18 April 1972 – 18 June 1975
- Nominated by: Emílio Garrastazu Médici
- Preceded by: Francisco Xavier de Albuquerque
- Succeeded by: Henrique Fonseca de Araújo

Personal details
- Born: José Carlos Moreira Alves; 19 April 1933 Taubaté, São Paulo, Brazil
- Died: 6 October 2023 (aged 90) Brasília, Federal District, Brazil
- Education: Federal University of Rio de Janeiro (LL.B.)
- Profession: Professor, magistrate

José Carlos Moreira Alves (19 April 1933 – 6 October 2023) was a Brazilian Roman Law scholar and magistrate. He served as Prosecutor General of the Republic from 1972 to 1975 and was a Minister of the Supreme Federal Court from 1975 to 2003.

Alves died in Brasília on 6 October 2023, at the age of 90.

Legal offices
Preceded by Francisco Xavier de Albuquerque	Prosecutor General of the Republic; 1972–1975	Succeeded by Henrique de Fonseca Araújo
Preceded by Osvaldo Trigueiro	Justice of the Supreme Federal Court; 1975–2003	Succeeded by Joaquim Barbosa
Preceded by Cordeiro Guerra	President of the Supreme Federal Court; 1985–1987	Succeeded by Rafael Mayer
