= Luiz Fux =

Brazilian judge (born 1953)

His Excellency Luiz Fux
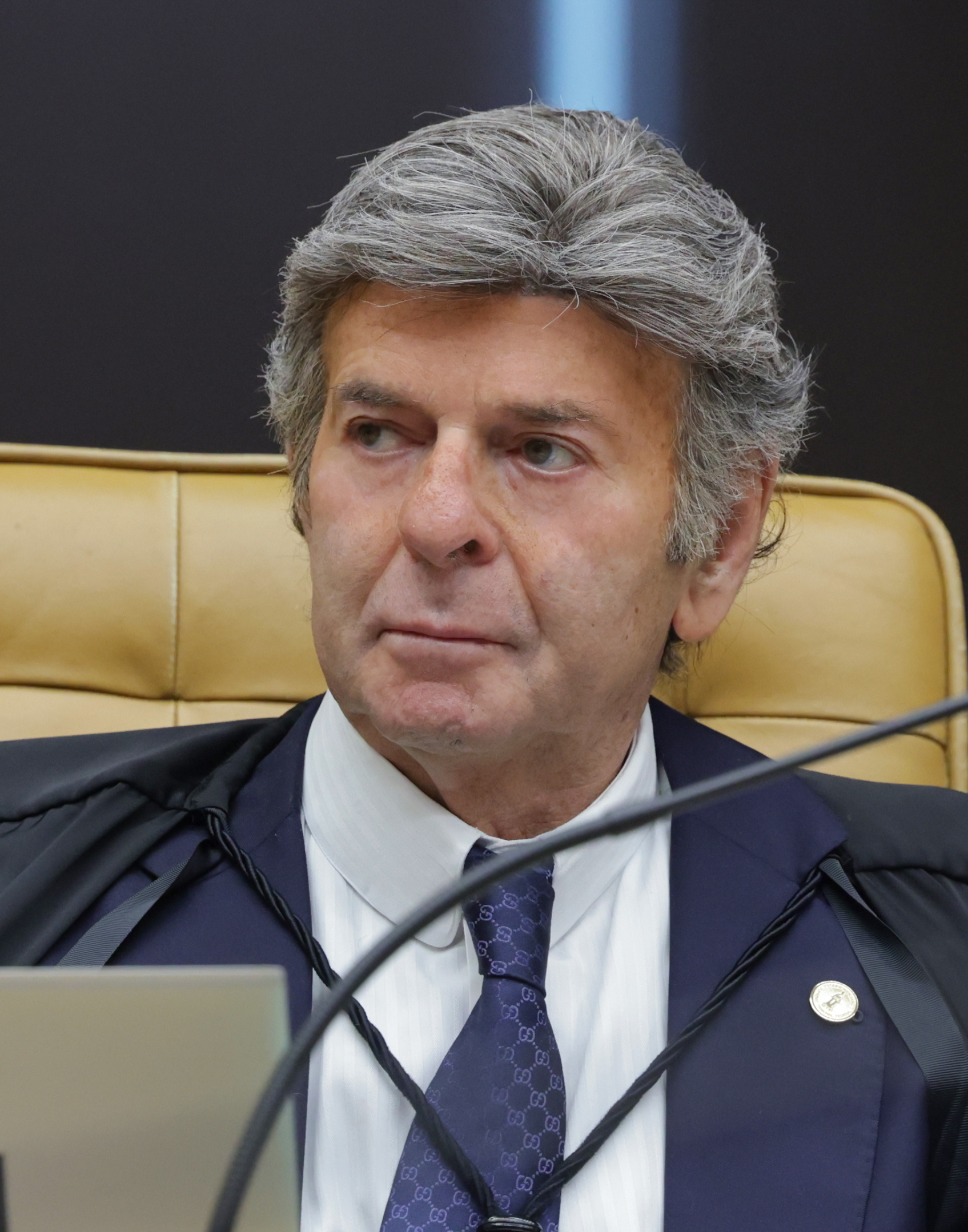
- Fux in 2025

Justice of the Supreme Federal Court
- Incumbent
- Assumed office 3 March 2011
- Appointed by: Dilma Rousseff
- Preceded by: Eros Grau

President of the Supreme Federal Court
- In office 10 September 2020 – 12 September 2022
- Vice President: Rosa Weber
- Preceded by: Dias Toffoli
- Succeeded by: Rosa Weber

Personal details
- Born: 26 April 1953 (age 73) Rio de Janeiro, Brazil
- Spouse: Eliane Fux
- Children: Marianna; Rodrigo
- Education: State University of Rio de Janeiro
- Other judicial positions: 2020–2022: President, National Justice Council; 2018–2020: Vice President, National Justice Council; 2018–2020: Vice President, Supreme Federal Court; 2018–2018: President, Superior Electoral Court; 2016–2018: Vice President, Superior Electoral Court; 2014–: Effective Justice, Superior Electoral Court; 2011–2014: Substitute Justice, Superior Electoral Court; 2001–2011: Justice, Superior Court of Justice

Luiz Fux (Portuguese pronunciation: [luˈis ˈfuks]; born 26 April 1953) is a Brazilian judge and former Chief Justice of the Supreme Federal Court. He is of Romanian Jewish descent, and the first Jewish Brazilian member of the Court. Fux was previously a justice of the Superior Court of Justice before assuming his position at the Supreme Court.

== Legal career ==
After graduating from the law school of the then-State University of Guanabara (now State University of Rio de Janeiro) in 1976, Fux first worked as an in-house counsel for oil company Shell Brasil Petróleo Ltda. until 1978. From 1978 until 1982 he served as a prosecutor for the Public Prosecutor's Office of the State of Rio de Janeiro.

In 1983, Fux started his tenure as a judge in Rio de Janeiro state, after an exam in which he achieved the best score, and was later promoted to the position of Entrância Especial judge and assigned to the 9th Civil Court of the State of Rio de Janeiro. Fux served as an electoral judge in the 13th and 25th Electoral Zones in Rio de Janeiro, and later promoted to the position of judge of the Court of Jurisdiction of the State of Rio de Janeiro.

In 1997, Fux was appointed to the Court of Justice of the State of Rio de Janeiro, where he remained until 2001.

=== Career in the STJ ===
In 2001, Fux was appointed by then-President Fernando Henrique Cardoso as a justice (ministro) of the Superior Court of Justice (STJ) as the third judge of the Courts of Justice, filling a vacancy left by justice Hélio Mosimann, who had retired. He was sworn in on 29 October 2001.

In 2003, Luiz Fux was rapporteur in the Superior Court of Justice trial that legalised Tele Sena, reversing a decision by the Federal Court of the 3rd Region. In March 2005, Fux was admitted by President Luiz Inácio Lula da Silva to the Order of Military Merit in the degree of Special Commander.

=== Career in the STF and TSE ===
Fux was appointed as a justice of the Supreme Federal Court (STF) by President Dilma Rousseff on 1 February 2011 filling a vacancy left by the retirement of justice Eros Grau in August 2010. On 10 February, his nomination was confirmed in a 68-2 vote by the Senate, and Fux started his tenure in the court on 3 March 2011. On 23 March 2011, Fux gave the decisive vote rendering the Lei da Ficha Limpa unconstitutional in its applicability to the 2010 Brazilian general election.

In an interview with Folha de S.Paulo on 2 December 2012, Fux spoke about the lobbying effort that preceded his nomination to the Supreme Court by President Dilma Rousseff. Among those he claimed requested political support was José Dirceu, Chief of Staff of President Lula, then still an influential figure in the ruling Workers Party (PT), despite his implication in the Mensalão scandal. In several meetings, they discussed the forthcoming criminal trial in the Supreme Court. José Dirceu allegedly interpreted the conversations as a promise of acquittal by the would-be justice. Once a member of the court, Justice Fux sided with the majority, voting to convict most defendants, including José Dirceu himself.

Fux has also served as a member of the Superior Electoral Court (TSE) since 2014, and has served as the TSE's vice-president from 2016 to 2017 and president in 2018.

In 2025, Fux cast a dissenting vote in the trial of former president Jair Bolsonaro in the STF and ruled to acquit him on charges of attempting a coup.

== Personal life ==
Fux has practiced Brazilian Jiu-Jitsu since the age of 26 and is currently an 8th degree white and red belt.

== Honours ==
- Medalha do Pacificador (Brazil, 2013)

Legal offices
Preceded by Hélio Mosimann	Justice of the Superior Court of Justice; 2001–2011	Succeeded by Marco Aurélio Bellizze
Preceded by Eros Grau	Justice of the Supreme Federal Court; 2011–present	Incumbent
Preceded by Gilmar Mendes	President of the Superior Electoral Court; 2018	Succeeded by Rosa Weber
Preceded by Dias Toffoli	President of the Supreme Federal Court; 2020–2022	Succeeded by Rosa Weber
