= Luís Roberto Barroso =

Brazilian professor, jurist and justice (born 1958)

His Excellency Luís Roberto Barroso
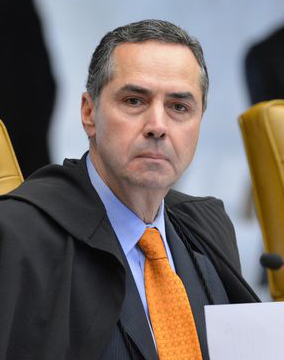
- Barroso in 2014

Justice of the Supreme Federal Court
- In office 26 June 2013 – 18 October 2025
- Appointed by: Dilma Rousseff
- Preceded by: Ayres Britto

President of the Supreme Federal Court
- In office 28 September 2023 – 29 September 2025
- Vice President: Edson Fachin
- Preceded by: Rosa Weber
- Succeeded by: Edson Fachin

Personal details
- Born: 11 March 1958 (age 68) Vassouras, Rio de Janeiro, Brazil
- Spouse: Tereza Cristina van Brussel (died 2023)
- Children: 2
- Education: Rio de Janeiro State University (LL.B., PhD); Yale University (LL.M.)
- Other judicial positions: 2022–2023: Vice President, Supreme Federal Court; 2020–2022: President, Superior Electoral Court; 2018–2020: Vice President, Superior Electoral Court; 2018–2022: Effective Justice, Superior Electoral Court; 2014–2018: Substitute Justice, Superior Electoral Court

Luís Roberto Barroso (Portuguese pronunciation: [ɫwis, ɫwiʃ ʁoˈbeɾtu baˈʁɔzu]; born 11 March 1958) is a Brazilian law professor, jurist, and retired Justice of the Supreme Federal Court of Brazil, having been nominated to the position by President Dilma Rousseff in 2013. Between 2020 and 2022, Barroso also served as President of the Superior Electoral Court.

Barroso graduated in law from the Universidade do Estado do Rio de Janeiro (UERJ), holds a Master's Degree in law from Yale University, and a PhD from UERJ. He has done post-doctoral studies at Harvard Law School and he is a professor of Constitutional Law at UERJ.

He is considered a liberal and progressive Justice, providing landmark votes on the legalization of abortion in pregnancies originated from rape and the criminalization of homophobia and transphobia in Brazil.

On 18 October 2025, Justice Barroso officially retired from the Supreme Court.

== Life and career ==
Born in the city of Vassouras, Barroso received a bachelor's degree in law from the State University of Rio de Janeiro (UERJ) in 1980, and an LL.M. from Yale Law School in 1987. He received a doctorate in public law from UERJ in 2008 and is a tenured professor of constitutional law at the university. In 2011, Barroso was a visiting scholar at Harvard Law School, and while in the United States published the paper "Here, there and everywhere: human dignity in contemporary law and in the transnational discourse".

At 2011, Barroso became nationally known for being the lawyer of the militant Cesare Battisti in Brazil. Barroso implemented a defense that argued that his client's actions were justified because the actions were part of Battisti's fight against an authoritarian Italian regime.

Barroso owned the law firm Luís Roberto Barroso & Associados in Rio de Janeiro, which specialized in public law and Supreme Court litigation. Prior to being nominated to the Supreme Federal Court by Dilma Rousseff in May 2013 to replace Justice Carlos Ayres Britto, Barroso served as a state attorney in Rio de Janeiro state. He was the fourth Supreme Court nominee of Rousseff, who had previously nominated the justices Luiz Fux, Rosa Weber and Teori Zavascki. He was confirmed by the Federal Senate in early June, and was sworn into office on 26 June 2013.

Barroso has been invited to lecture in various universities around the world, including the New York University School of Law, in the United States, and London School of Economics and Oxford University, in England.

Barroso is an advocate for drug legalization, starting with decriminalizing the possession of marijuana for private consumption. His judicial views have been described as progressive.

On 9 October 2025, Barroso announced his retirement from the Supreme Federal Court, eight years before the mandatory retirement age of 75.

== Controversies ==
On 13 November 2022, while in New York City attending a conference by Grupo LIDE near Harvard Club, Barroso was approached by Brazilian demonstrators, and in response he uttered the phrase "Perdeu mané, não amola" (Brazilian Portuguese pronunciation: [peʁˈdew maˈnɛ nɐ̃w̃ aˈmɔlɐ]), meaning: You lost, man, don't bother me. It has become a notorious expression in Brazilian politics, having been defaced into a statue at the Praça dos Três Poderes by Débora Rodrigues, a far-right bolsonarist demonstrator during the 8 January 2023 attacks.

On 13 July 2023, while attending an event at UNE, he uttered the phrase "Nós derrotamos o bolsonarismo", meaning: We defeated Bolsonarism. The phrase has been used by conservative Brazilians to accuse Barrroso of bias. He apologized for the phrase and later expressed regret.

Legal offices
Preceded by Ayres Britto	Justice of the Supreme Federal Court; 2013–2025	Vacant
Preceded by Rosa Weber	Vice President of the Superior Electoral Court; 2018–2020	Succeeded by Luiz Edson Fachin
Preceded by Rosa Weber	President of the Superior Electoral Court; 2020–2022	Succeeded by Luiz Edson Fachin
Preceded by Rosa Weber	Vice President of the Supreme Federal Court; 2022–2023	Succeeded by Luiz Edson Fachin
Preceded by Rosa Weber	President of the Supreme Federal Court; 2023–2025	Succeeded by Luiz Edson Fachin
