= Edson Fachin =

Brazilian jurist and lawyer (born 1958)

His Excellency Edson Fachin

Justice of the Supreme Federal Court
- Incumbent
- Assumed office 16 June 2015
- Nominated by: Dilma Rousseff
- Preceded by: Joaquim Barbosa

President of the Supreme Federal Court
- Incumbent
- Assumed office 29 September 2025
- Vice President: Alexandre de Moraes
- Preceded by: Luís Roberto Barroso

President of the Superior Electoral Court
- In office 22 February 2022 – 16 August 2022
- Vice President: Alexandre de Moraes
- Preceded by: Luis Roberto Barroso
- Succeeded by: Alexandre de Moraes

Personal details
- Born: Luiz Edson Fachin; February 8, 1958 (age 68) Rondinha, Rio Grande do Sul, Brazil
- Education: Federal University of Paraná (LL.B.); Pontifical Catholic University of São Paulo (LL.M., LL.D.)

Luiz Edson Fachin (born 8 February 1958) is a Brazilian jurist and lawyer. On June 16, 2015, he became a justice of the Supreme Federal Court, having been nominated by President Dilma Rousseff. Since 2025 he has served as president of the same court, having been elected by his peers for a two-year term. Before his confirmation to the high court, he had served as professor of civil law of the Federal University of Paraná (UFPR).

== Early life and education ==
Fachin was born in the town of Rondinha, Rio Grande do Sul. One of his parents was a farmer, while the other worked as a teacher. His family moved to Toledo, Paraná, when Fachin was two years old. He attended the Federal University of Paraná (UFPR). He later received a master's degree and a doctorate from the Pontifical Catholic University of São Paulo.

== Academic career ==
Fachin worked as a professor of law at the Federal University of Paraná. He completed postgraduate studies in Canada, and was also a visiting researcher at the Max Planck Institute in Germany. During a sabbatical, he stayed in London, where he worked as a professor at King's College. He additionally taught at Pablo de Olavide University in Spain.

== Political views ==
Fachin is considered a progressive on judicial issues including land reform.

== Personal life ==
Fachin is fluent in English, Spanish, French and Italian. He is married to Rosana Amara Girardi Fachin, a member of the Paraná court of justice. He is known to be a supporter of the Coritiba Foot Ball Club.

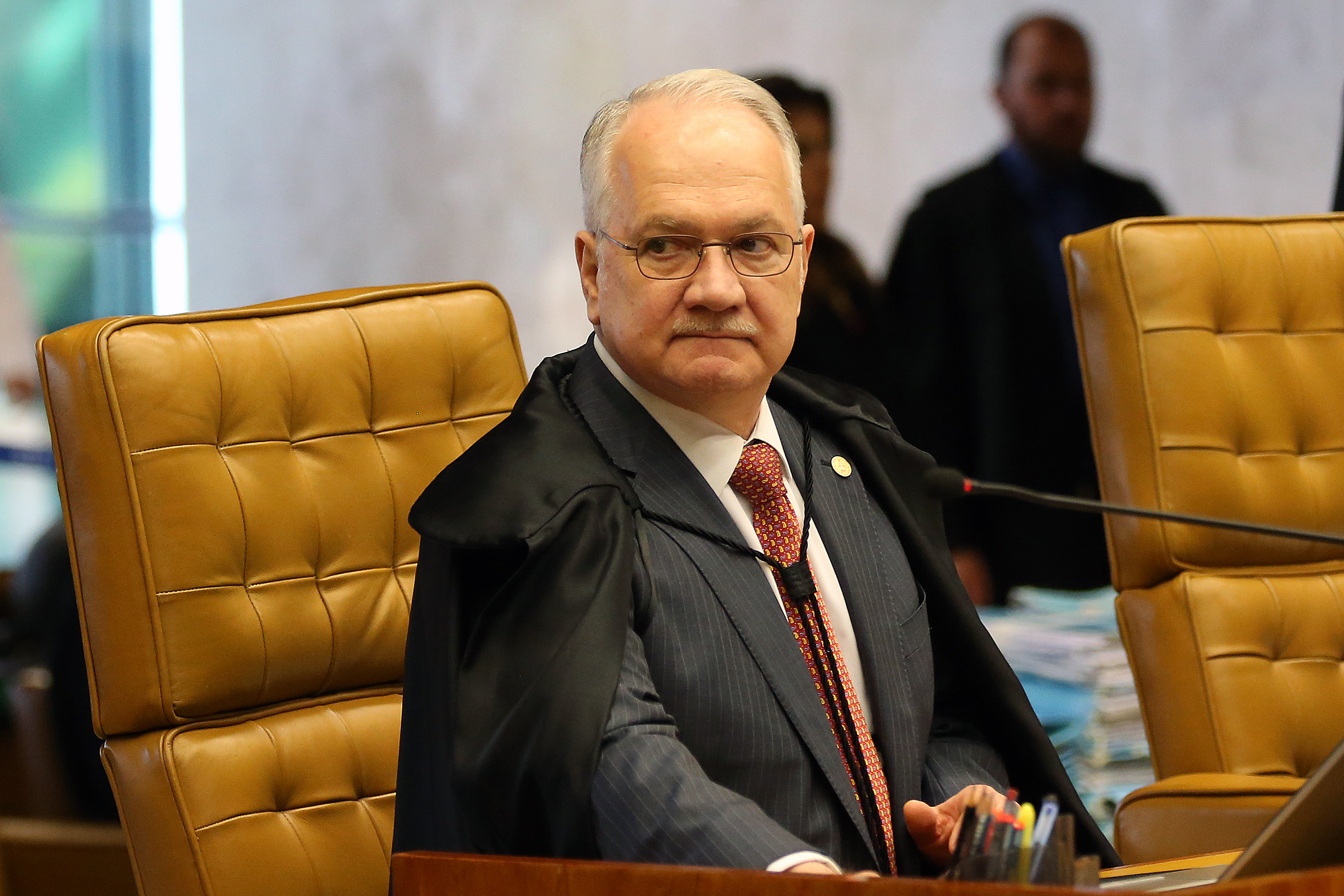
Fachin in 2018

== See also ==
- Operation Car Wash

Legal offices
Preceded by Joaquim Barbosa	Minister of the Supreme Federal Court; 2015–present	Incumbent
Preceded by Luis Roberto Barroso	Vice President of the Superior Electoral Court; 2020–2022	Succeeded by Alexandre de Moraes
Preceded by Luis Roberto Barroso	President of the Superior Electoral Court; 2022	Succeeded by Alexandre de Moraes
Preceded by Luís Roberto Barroso	President of the Supreme Federal Court; 2025–present	Incumbent
Lines of succession
Preceded by Davi Alcolumbre as President of the Federal Senate	Brazilian presidential line of succession 4th in line as President of the Supreme Federal Court	Last
Order of precedence
Preceded by Hugo Motta as President of the Chamber of Deputies	Brazilian order of precedence 7th in line as President of the Supreme Federal Court	Followed by Former Presidents of Brazil
