= Gilmar Mendes =

Brazilian jurist and politician

His Excellency Gilmar Mendes

Justice of the Supreme Federal Court
- Incumbent
- Assumed office June 20, 2002
- Appointed by: Fernando Henrique Cardoso
- Preceded by: Néri da Silveira

53rd President of the Supreme Federal Court
- In office April 23, 2008 – April 23, 2010
- Vice President: Cezar Peluso
- Preceded by: Ellen Gracie
- Succeeded by: Cezar Peluso

Attorney General of the Union
- In office January 21, 2000 – June 20, 2002
- President: Fernando Henrique Cardoso
- Preceded by: Geraldo Magela
- Succeeded by: José Bonifácio de Andrada

Personal details
- Born: December 30, 1955 (age 70) Diamantino, Mato Grosso, Brazil
- Education: University of Brasília (LL.B., LL.M.); University of Münster (LL.M., LL.D.)
- Other judicial positions: 2016–2018: President, Superior Electoral Court; 2014–2016: Vice President, Superior Electoral Court; 2013–2018: Effective Justice, Superior Electoral Court; 2010–2013: Substitute Justice, Superior Electoral Court; 2008–2010: President, National Justice Council; 2006–2008: Vice President, Supreme Federal Court; 2006–2008: Vice President, National Justice Council; 2006–2006: President, Superior Electoral Court; 2005–2005: Vice President, Superior Electoral Court; 2003–2006: Effective Justice, Superior Electoral Court

Gilmar Ferreira Mendes (Portuguese pronunciation: [ʒiwˈma(ʁ) feˈʁe(j).ɾɐ ˈmẽ.d͡ʒis]; born December 30, 1955) is a Brazilian Justice of the Supremo Tribunal Federal (Brazilian Supreme Federal Court), appointed by then President Fernando Henrique Cardoso in 2002. Mendes was the Chief Justice of the Court for the 2008–2010 term. Earlier, he had been the Attorney General from 2000 to 2002.

He has been criticised by legal scholars and journalists for the supposedly opportunistic political motivations of his rulings, and mocked for his alleged penchant for freeing powerful politicians suspected of corruption. In 2009, fellow Justice Joaquim Barbosa confronted him during a televised session of the Court, comparing him to a local criminal leader who commanded "thugs".

== Early life ==
Mendes was born in Diamantino, Mato Grosso. He graduated with a bachelor's degree in Law from University of Brasília, received his master's degree in Law from the same university, another master's degree in Law from University of Münster (Westfälische Wilhelms-Universität Münster) with the dissertation "Presupposed Admissibility of the Abstract Norm Control in the Federal Constitutional Court" (Die Zulassigkeitsvoraussetzungen der abstrakten Normenkontrolle vor dem Bundesverfassungsgericht) and a PhD in Law from the same university with the thesis "Abstract Norm Control in the Federal Constitutional Court and the Brazilian Supremo Tribunal Federal (Die abstrakte Normenkontrolle vor dem Bundesverfassungsgericht und vor dem brasilianischen Supremo Tribunal Federal).

== Career as Supreme Court Justice ==
Gilmar Mendes was assigned to the Supreme Court by presidente Fernando Henrique Cardoso. During his tenure, Mendes took the position of vice-Chief Justice (2006–2008) and then took oath as Chief Justice (2008–2010). Mendes was also president of the Nacional Justice Council (2008–2010), and implemented a national plan to modernize Brazilian Justice, which resulted in the judgement of 2.72 million old cases (dated before 2006). During his tenure, other measures were taken to enhance dynamism and efficiency in the Brazilian judicial system, such as the creation of the Electronic judicial process and the lower criminal and civil virtual courts, among others.

In addition to his role as a leading judge, Mendes has contributed to doctrine and research, having published many books, articles and participated in academic events.

== Controversies, scandals and accusations of corruption ==
Gilmar Mendes was the least supported nomination to the Supreme Court ever approved by the senate, with three times more senators voting against him than the next most rejected justice, Eros Grau.

In July 2008, Gilmar Mendes granted two habeas corpus to the Brazilian financier Daniel Dantas, investigated and arrested by the federal police in operation Satiagraha. Mr. Dantas was arrested and released by Gilmar Mendes' order twice in less than two days. Political bloggers and political personalities started to refer to him as "Gilmar Dantas" after that episode, highlighting his deep connections to the interests of Dantas. Shortly after the second habeas corpus, a group of 134 active federal judges and personalities signed a petition supporting the judge who had issued the arrest warranties against Dantas, judge Fausto Martins DeSanctis, against Mendes' decision. In the same occasion, Mendes accused the Federal Police of tapping his phone, claiming that Brazil was becoming a police state under President Lula and his appointee for the federal police, Paulo Fernando da Costa Lacerda. Gilmar Mendes was never able to show any evidence of the tapping, but the attention given the supposed scandal by the Brazilian media eventually ousted Lacerda from his position.

Around the same time in 2008, the Brazilian weekly magazine CartaCapital published a piece on the scandals surrounding Gilmar Mendes, denouncing his connection with the law school prep course among other ethically dubious conduct from the justice, particularly paying R$8 million to buy his partner's share out in the endeavor as a way to silence him about how the institute was administered. Mr. Mendes sued the publication, saying that the article was "denigrating his public image" and "hurting his credibility". In November 2010, judge Adriana Sachsida Garcia, from the Tribunal of Justice of the State of São Paulo dismissed Mr. Mendes' claims.

In August, 2012, Gilmar Mendes asked the Brazilian Federal Police to investigate Wikipedia. According to the newspaper O Estado de S. Paulo, he argues that the Portuguese language Wikipedia's article showcasing his biography uses "journalistic sources" which are not adequate for an "informative article". The sources he referred to were from a weekly magazine that gathered denunciations of corruption involving him.

In April 2013, Gilmar Mendes was again in controversy, blocking legislation that would have imposed checks and balances to the power of the Brazilian Supreme Court, claiming that the legislation would be unconstitutional. Never before in Brazilian history had the judiciary branch intervened to stop a law or constitutional amendment before it was even debated and approved by the people's representatives.

On April 23, 2026, Mendes stated that it is not appropriate to ridicule serious issues involving institutions, and questioned whether it would be offensive, for example, to portray politician Romeu Zema, who has criticized the actions of justices of the Supreme Federal Court, as homosexual. The statement was criticized by internet users, who considered it prejudiced.

On the same day, Mendes apologized for the statement. Toni Reis, in an article published on the Congresso em Foco website, condemned Mendes's statement but argued that he should not be judged solely by it, citing his rulings regarding LGBTQ rights.

On April 27, 2026, the Attorney General's Office dismissed a lawsuit against Mendes for homophobia.

Political offices
Preceded by Geraldo Magela	Attorney General of the Union; 2000–2002	Succeeded by José Bonifácio de Andrada
Legal offices
Preceded by Néri da Silveira	Justice of the Supreme Federal Court; 2002–present	Incumbent
Preceded by Carlos Velloso	President of the Superior Electoral Court; 2006	Succeeded by Marco Aurélio Mello
Preceded by Ellen Gracie	President of the Supreme Federal Court; 2008–2010	Succeeded by Cezar Peluso
Preceded by Dias Toffoli	President of the Superior Electoral Court; 2016–2018	Succeeded by Luiz Fux
