= Joaquim Barbosa =

Brazilian judge (born 1954)

His Excellency Joaquim Barbosa
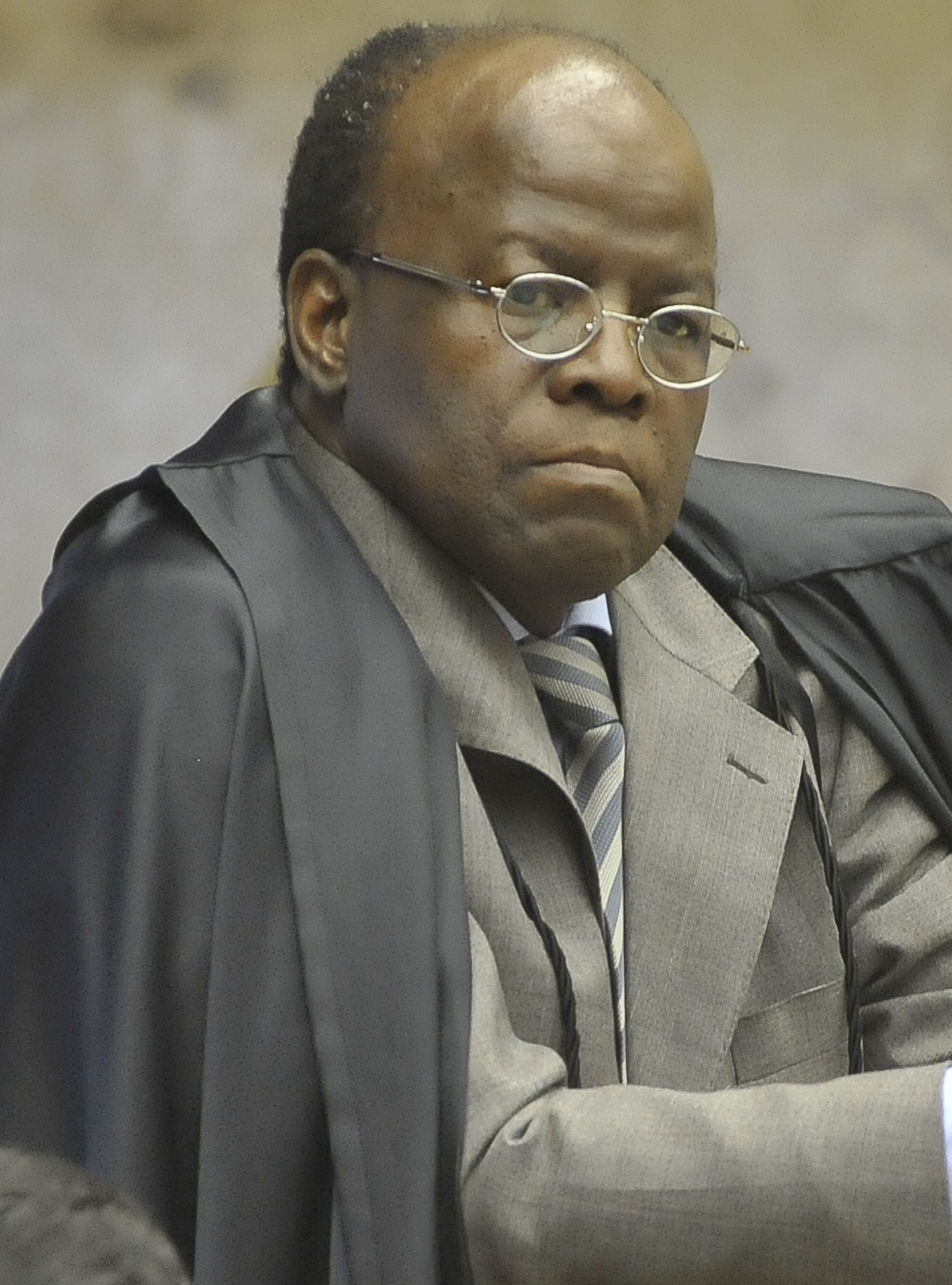
- Barbosa in 2012

Justice of the Supreme Federal Court
- In office June 25, 2003 – July 31, 2014
- Appointed by: Luiz Inácio Lula da Silva
- Preceded by: Moreira Alves
- Succeeded by: Edson Fachin

56th President of the Supreme Federal Court
- In office November 22, 2012 – July 31, 2014
- Vice President: Ricardo Lewandowski
- Preceded by: Ayres Britto
- Succeeded by: Ricardo Lewandowski

Personal details
- Born: Joaquim Benedito Barbosa Gomes; October 7, 1954 (age 71) Paracatu, Minas Gerais, Brazil
- Party: PSB (2018–present)
- Spouse: Marileuza Francisco de Andrade (m. 1980; div. 1987)
- Children: Felipe
- Education: University of Brasília; Panthéon-Assas University
- Other judicial positions: 2012–2014: President, National Justice Council; 2012–2012: Vice President, Supreme Federal Court; 2012–2012: Vice President, National Justice Council; 2008–2010: Vice President, Superior Electoral Court; 2006–2008: Effective Justice, Superior Electoral Court; 2006–2006: Substitute Justice, Superior Electoral Court

Joaquim Benedito Barbosa Gomes (Portuguese pronunciation: [ʒwɐˈkĩ beneˈdʒitu bɐʁˈbɔzɐ ˈɡomis]; born October 7, 1954) is a former Justice of the Supreme Federal Court in Brazil. He served as the president of the court (Chief Justice) between 2012 and 2014.

Barbosa studied law at University of Brasília (1979) and holds a master's degree (1990) and a doctorate (1993) from Panthéon-Assas University. He is a Doctor Honoris Causa of Hebrew University (2015).

In 2013, he was elected by Time magazine as one of the 100 most influential people in the world.

== Early life and education ==
Barbosa is the oldest son of a bricklayer father and a housewife mother. He started his education in the Brazilian public school system in his hometown, later completed in Brasília.

He worked as a cleaner and typesetter before attending law school at the University of Brasília

Barbosa studied law at University of Brasília (1979). He holds a Master (1990) and a Doctor (1993) of Laws from DEA - Droit Public Interne - Panthéon-Assas University.

== Early career ==
After graduating from the University of Brasila, Barbosa began working for the Brazilian diplomatic service, Itamaraty, as a chancery official. His first assignment was to Helsinki, Finland.

Barbosa was a member of the Federal Public Ministry and adjunct professor at Rio de Janeiro State University. He was also a visiting scholar at the Human Rights Institute at Columbia Law School, in New York City (1999 to 2000), and at UCLA School of Law (2002 to 2003).

Along with his position at Itamaraty, he served as a public servant for some Brazilian departments, and lately as a public prosecutor of the Public Ministry.

Aside from his academic achievements, Minister Barbosa also became fluent in French, Spanish, English and German.

== Supreme Federal Court ==
Barbosa was appointed to the office by President Luiz Inácio Lula da Silva on June 25, 2003, along with Ayres Britto and Cezar Peluso.

=== Justice ===
Among many other actions, he is the judge rapporteur for Criminal Action 470 (also known as Mensalão scandal) and his further development, the Criminal Action 536 (also known as Mensalão mineiro).

As of November 2012, he has 8,460 actions under his responsibility being processed by the Court.

Barbosa suffers from sacroiliitis, an inflammatory disease, which notably makes it uncomfortable for him to remain seated. Barbosa has often been noted for his practice of attending session while standing up.

=== President ===
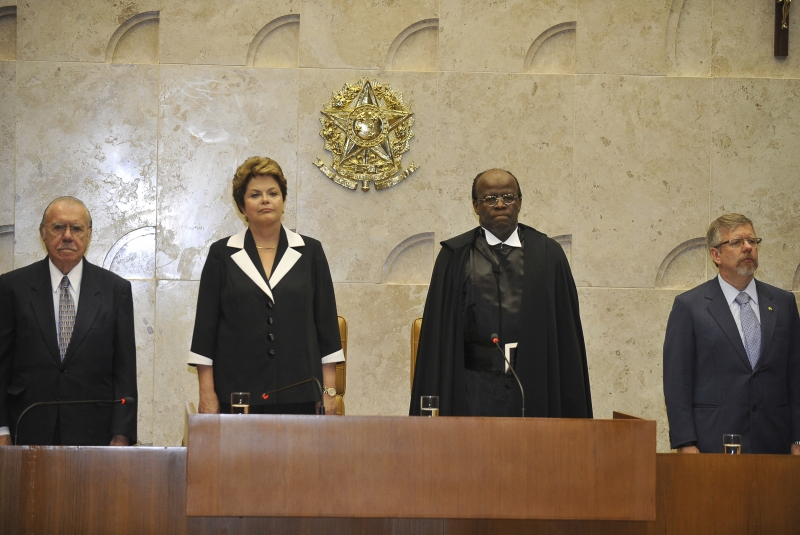
From left to right: José Sarney (then President of the Senate), Dilma Rousseff (then President of Brazil), Barbosa and Marco Maia (then President of the Chamber of Deputies) during the tenure of Barbosa as President of the Supreme Federal Court, November 22, 2012.

He took the office as the acting president of the court on November 17, 2012, because of the mandatory retirement of his colleague Ayres Britto, as he was the current vice-president of the Court. However, he was already the President Elect of the Court as chosen by his fellows in October 2012, keeping the tradition the oldest member not served yet as president to be elected to that position.

Barbosa demonstrates unconditional defense in some questions. He is against the power of prosecutors to file administrative investigations. He argues about transfer the competency to hear cases on slave labor to federal court. Barbosa opposes also the privileged forum for authorities. His tenure start on November 22, 2012 was attended by President Dilma Rousseff, Senate President José Sarney, among many other celebrities.

The welcoming speech has been delivered by Justice Luiz Fux.

== 2018 presidential election ==
In 2018, Barbosa joined the Brazilian Socialist Party (PSB) ahead of a potential candidacy in the 2018 presidential election. Polling in 2018 by Datafolha had him at 10% of the vote, placing him in third place. However, he ultimately chose not to run for president.

== Key positions ==
Demonstrates unconditional defense in certain administrative matters. It is against the power of the prosecutor to file administrative inquiries, or to preside police investigations. It argues that transfer the jurisdiction to hear cases of slave labor for the federal Justice. Takes the view that dispatching with lawyers should be an exception, and never a routine, to the ministers of the Supreme. Restricts the most of your attention to parts of lawyers, understanding that this liberality of the judge can not lead to inequality. The minister's position, however, is criticized by lawyers and the Bar Association of Brazil (OAB), on the grounds that dispatching with the magistrates is a right of lawyers, conferred by Law 8.906 / 94, whose art. 7, section VIII precepts to be right lawyers, "go directly to the magistrates in the rooms and work offices, regardless of previously scheduled time or another condition, observing the arrival order".The Minister Barbosa says is also against the alleged preferential jurisdiction providing the parties with greater purchasing power ("jump the queue"). The minister's stance has also been criticized for OAB, on the grounds that sometimes emergency situations really justify the reversal of the judgment order. Barbosa opposes also the privileged forum for authorities.

== Controversy ==
The Panama Papers revealed that the former Supreme Court judge paid $335,000 in cash for a condo in Miami. The judge denied any wrongdoing.

== Legal consultancy ==
Having presided over the nation's most significant political corruption trial as a jurist, Justice Barbosa has now retired from public service. However, he remains active in his role as a legal consultant. Joaquim Barbosa, acclaimed by a Brazilian newsweekly as "the poor boy who transformed Brazil," advocates for knowledge dissemination and education.

Legal offices
Preceded by Moreira Alves	Justice of the Supreme Federal Court; 2003–2014	Succeeded by Edson Fachin
Preceded by Ayres Britto	President of the Supreme Federal Court; 2012–2014	Succeeded by Ricardo Lewandowski
