= Rio de Janeiro State University =

Public university in Rio de Janeiro, Brazil

- Universidade do Estado do Rio de Janeiro
- Former names: University of the Federal District; University of Rio de Janeiro
- Type: Public research university
- Established: 12 October 1930 (95 years ago) (Faculty of Economics); 4 December 1950 (75 years ago) (University)
- Affiliations: CRUB; RENEX; ABRUEM
- Budget: R$1.3 billion (2020)
- Rector: Mario Carneiro
- Academic staff: ~2,800 (2020)
- Administrative staff: ~5,600 (2020)
- Students: ~43,000 (2020)
- Location: Rio de Janeiro, Rio de Janeiro, Brazil; 22°54′40″S 43°14′10″W
- Campus: Urban 40 acres (16 ha) (Main campus) 8 municipalities; Angra dos Reis; Duque de Caxias; Nova Friburgo; Petrópolis; Resende; Rio de Janeiro; São Gonçalo; Teresópolis; Cabo Frio
- Colors: Blue, Red and Golden
- Mascot: None
- Website: uerj.br

Rio de Janeiro State University (UERJ; Portuguese: Universidade do Estado do Rio de Janeiro) is a public research university in the state of Rio de Janeiro, Brazil. It is one of the largest and most prestigious universities in the country. The university's law and medical schools are among the best in the nation (according to the Exame Nacional de Desempenho de Estudantes ranking and the Order of Attorneys of Brazil). Its Biology, Social Science, Nursing and Philosophy courses are also highly praised, as stated by Guia do Estudante.

U.S. News & World Report elected UERJ as the 5th best university in Brazil, the 11th best university in Latin America and 464th in the world. Its main campus is called Francisco Negrão de Lima and is located in the Maracanã neighborhood of Rio de Janeiro city. Other campuses are located in Petrópolis, Nova Friburgo (Polytechnic Institute), Teresópolis, Duque de Caxias, Angra dos Reis, Resende, and São Gonçalo.

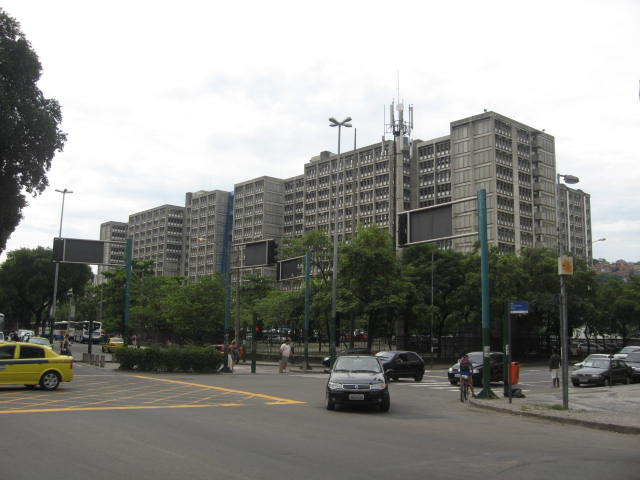
Maracanã Campus

== History ==
The university was founded on December 4, 1950, as University of the Federal District (UDF). Due to political shifts, the university experienced various name changes. In 1961, after the Federal District was moved to Brasília, it was renamed Guanabara State University (UEG). It was only in 1975 that the university received its current name, when the State of Guanabara merged with the old State of Rio de Janeiro to form a new State of Rio de Janeiro.

The university's first four schools were the Rio de Janeiro Faculty of Economic Sciences, the Rio de Janeiro Faculty of Law, the Faculty of Philosophy of the La-Fayette Institute, and the Faculty of Medical Sciences.

Some of the schools (e.g. the Faculty of Law, founded in 1935) are older than the university itself, and were joined upon the university's founding.

== Education ==
UERJ currently enrolls approximately 43,000 students. They have one of the country's biggest educational structures at their disposal, with 90 undergraduate programs, unfolded in different qualifications, education, and bachelor courses. The university also boasts 63 master's degree programs, two professional master's degree programs and 46 doctorate degree programs. The institution also offers 80 lato sensu graduate programs in Humanities and Social Sciences, Biomedical Sciences, Mathematics, Computer Science, and Natural Sciences.

In addition, the university offers primary and secondary education in the Instituto de Aplicação Fernando Rodrigues da Silveira - CAp/UERJ to approximately 1,000 students. This unit also serves as a teacher training center.

UERJ has ample infrastructure to support the academic and cultural qualification of its students, such as auditoriums, multimedia resources, computer and science laboratories, and various training centers. There is also a library network, Rede Sirius, composed of 21 libraries. The network offers more than 1,000 titles in different fields of knowledge, as well as some rare items, documents, iconography, and the university archives. As a complement to the learning process, UERJ offers training scheme scholarships, including those of scientific and teacher training.

== Health ==
This structure has been developed since the foundation of the institution, with the incorporation of already existing units, such as Pedro Ernesto University Hospital (HUPE) and Piquet Carneiro Polyclinic (PPC), along with the creation of specialized centers.

HUPE was integrated to UERJ in 1962 and has become a household name in the state of Rio de Janeiro, not only for its role of providing medical assistance to the local population, but also in terms of its teaching practice and scientific research. With 50 medical specialties, it performs about 1,000 surgeries a month and more than 30,000 monthly medical care procedures.

Besides HUPE, specialized centers have been created to support specific public demands. Some of them are pioneers, such as the Teenage Health Study Center (Nesa) and the Clinic for the Treatment of Pain, which combats chronic pain. There are also Center for Senior Citizens' Care (UNATI), Hypertension Care Clinic (Clinex), and Ricardo Montalban's Outpatient Psychiatric Hospital, among others.

Moreover, Piquet Carneiro Polyclinic, a former medical care center, integrates teaching and assistance at the university. The Polyclinic is responsible for more than 15,000 monthly ambulatory and home appointments, counting on many medical specialties. In its Center for Minor Surgery, the medical teams execute surgeries of little complexity which need no hospitalization.

The health assistance structure at UERJ still counts on other centers that offer specialized assistance to the population, such as the University Center for Cancer Control (CUCC) created in partnership with the National Institute for Cancer (INCA) and Petrobras (the Brazilian national oil company).

== See also ==
- List of state universities in Brazil
