= Ayres Britto =

Brazilian judge (born 1942)

His Excellency Ayres Britto JD-PhD
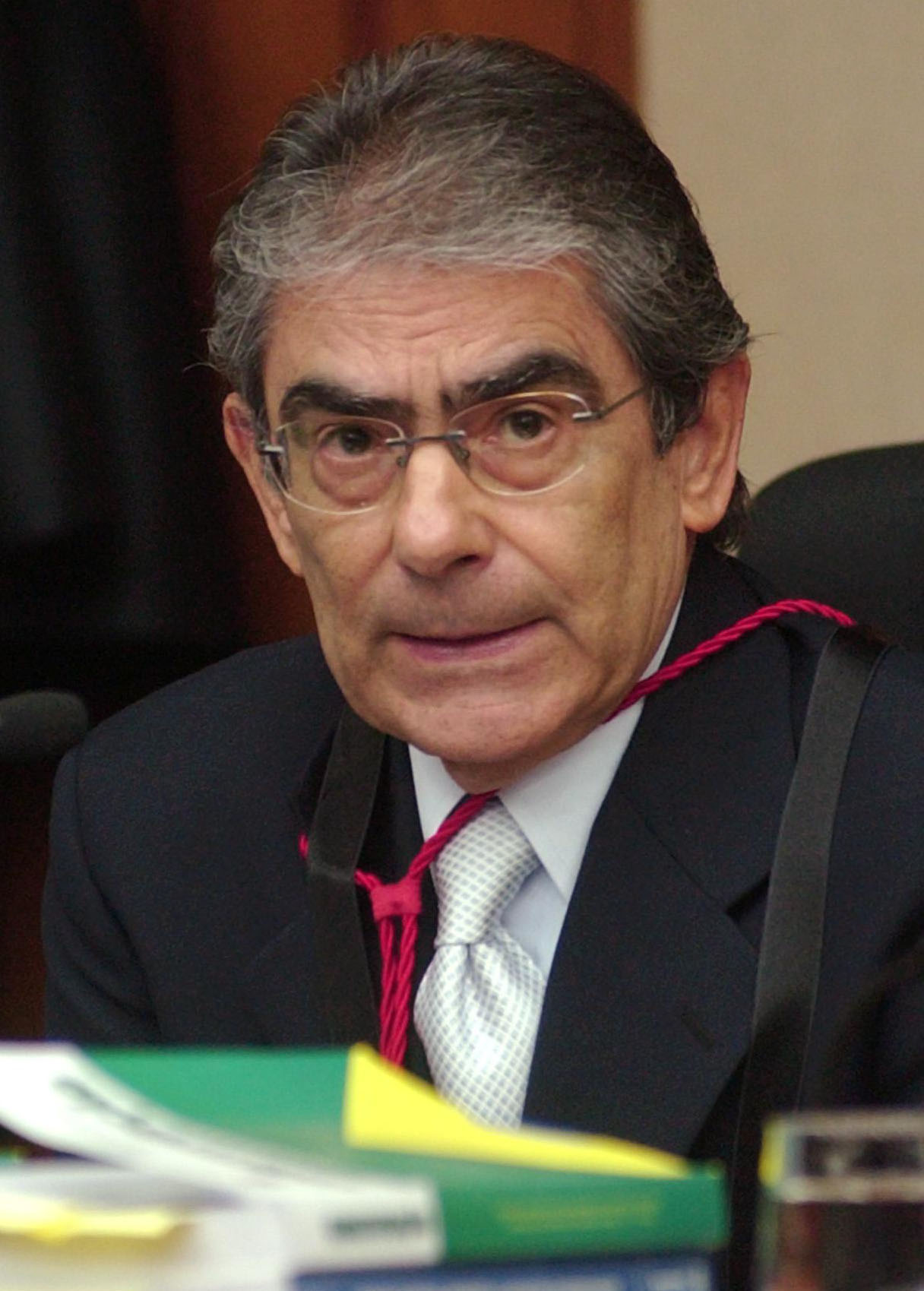

Justice of the Supreme Federal Court
- In office June 25, 2003 – November 16, 2012
- Appointed by: Luiz Inácio Lula da Silva
- Preceded by: Ilmar Galvão
- Succeeded by: Luís Roberto Barroso

55th President of the Supreme Federal Court
- In office April 19, 2012 – November 16, 2012
- Vice President: Joaquim Barbosa
- Preceded by: Cezar Peluso
- Succeeded by: Joaquim Barbosa

Personal details
- Born: November 18, 1942 (age 83) Propriá, Sergipe, Brazil
- Spouse: Rita de Cássia Pinheiro Reis de Britto
- Education: Federal University of Sergipe
- Other judicial positions: 2012–2012: President, National Justice Council; 2010–2012: Vice President, Supreme Federal Court; 2010–2012: Vice President, National Justice Council; 2008–2010: President, Superior Electoral Court; 2006–2010: Effective Justice, Superior Electoral Court; 2005–2006: Substitute Justice, Superior Electoral Court

Carlos Augusto Ayres de Freitas Britto (born November 18, 1942, in Propriá, Sergipe) is a Brazilian jurist and was a Justice of the Supreme Federal Court of Brazil. He was appointed by President Luiz Inácio Lula da Silva and served from June 25, 2003, to November 16, 2012, when he faced mandatory retirement upon reaching the age of 70.

He was the chief justice of the Supreme Court of Brazil from April 19, 2012, until his retirement.

Bachelor in Law (1966)by the Federal University of Sergipe, institution of which he would become professor, is master (1982) and doctor (1998) by the Pontifical Catholic University of São Paulo, being guided in the doctorate by Celso Ribeiro Bastos.

Despite his quite short term as Chief Justice of Brazil, he succeeded to conduct many major cases, as well start the trial of the Criminal Action 470 (popularly nicknamed Mensalão), one of the most complex cases in history to be examined by that Court.

He is currently an occasional contributor to O Estado de S. Paulo, a Brazilian newspaper.

Legal offices
Preceded by Ilmar Galvão	Justice of the Supreme Federal Court; 2003–2012	Succeeded by Luís Roberto Barroso
