= Order of Attorneys of Brazil =

- Ordem dos Advogados do Brasil
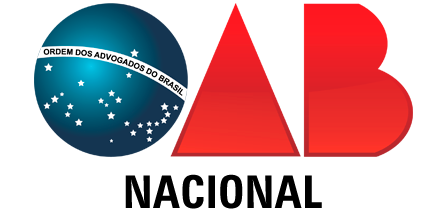
- Logo of the OAB Federal Council
- Abbreviation: OAB
- Formation: 18 November 1930; 95 years ago
- Type: Bar association
- Headquarters: Brasília, Federal District
- Location: Brazil
- Members: 1,337,651 practising, 1,413,330 total (2023)
- Official language: Portuguese
- President: José Alberto Simonetti
- Website: www.oab.org.br

The Order of Attorneys of Brazil (Portuguese: Ordem dos Advogados do Brasil, OAB) is the Brazilian Bar Association. Founded in 1930, it is responsible for the regulation of the legal profession in the country. Its national headquarters are in Brasília, Federal District. The OAB has 1,065,304 lawyers (2018). This number rose to 1,211,309 as of early 2021.

Its early origins are found on a private institution founded in 1843. Graduates in Law from university who wish to act on behalf of clients before a Court of Law must register at the Order of Attorneys of Brazil. Only those who are duly registered can provide legal consultation and appear before the Court. It is an organization independent from the government, but it has some public powers, which include disciplinary action over its members. The Federal Constitution of Brazil considered advocacy an essential activity for the maintenance of justice, and Art. 133 provides that "The lawyer is indispensable to the administration of justice and is inviolable for his acts or manifestations in the exercise of his profession, within the limits of the law." Furthermore, the institution has sui generis qualities, since it is not linked to any control by the government, nor by the courts of auditors, as understood by the Supreme Federal Court externalized in 2006.

== Bar examination ==
In Brazil, the bar examination occurs nationally in March, August and December. These examinations are unified and organized by the Order of Attorneys of Brazil. After 5 years in law school, Bachelors of Laws take the Bar exam that consists of 2 phases: the multiple choice test and the written test, without further requirements.

The Constitution of Brazil sets restrictions on the professional practice of law embodied in the fulfillment of the requirements and qualifications they require, which may include, in addition to graduation formal submission of the applicant in the proficiency tests. The Bar exam is pursuant to Law No. 8906 of July 4, 1994.

== See also ==
- Order of Attorneys of Portugal
- Bar examination
- Law of Brazil
