= National Council of Justice =

Advisory judicial body in Brazil

- Conselho Nacional de Justiça
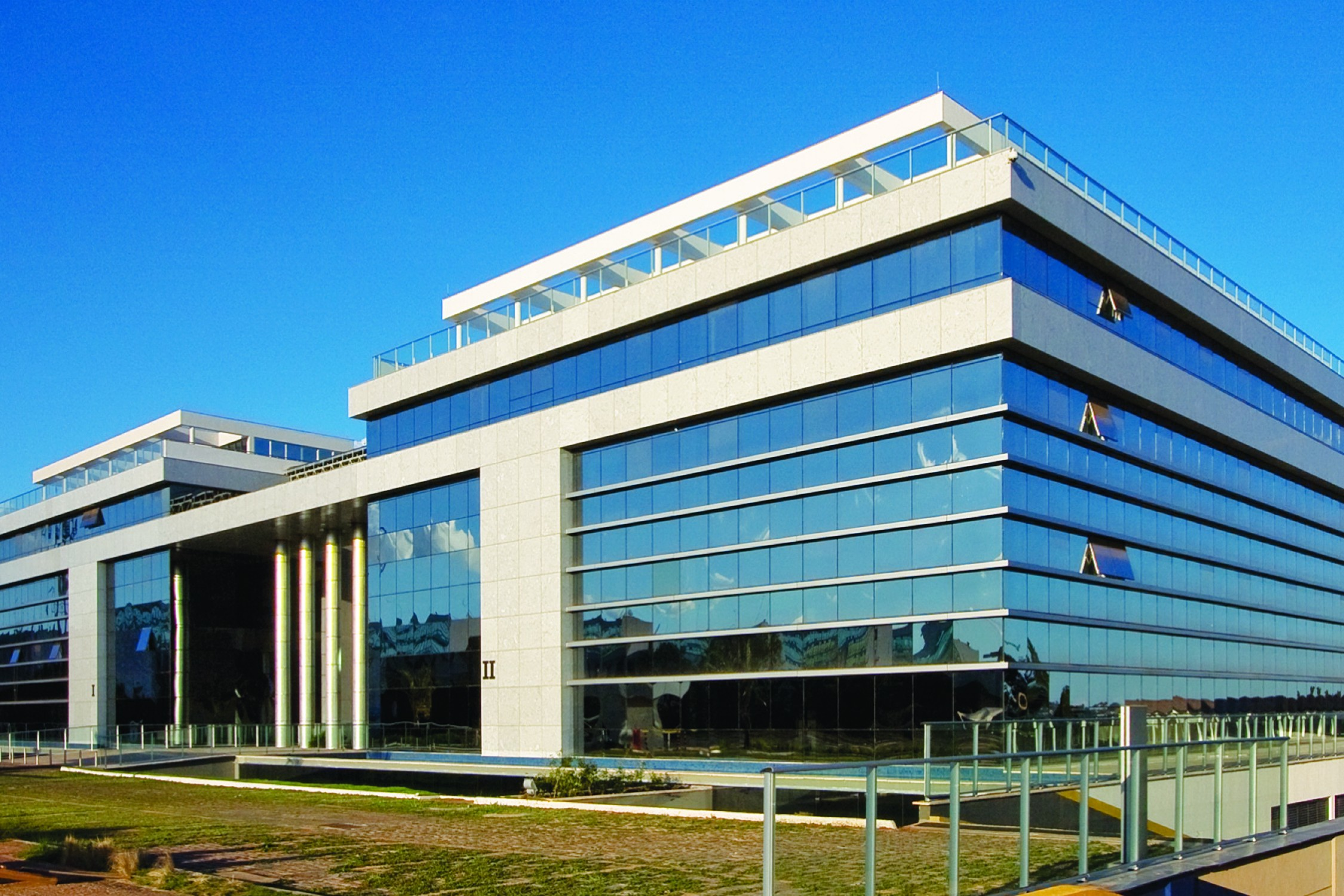
- The CNJ headquarters in Brasília

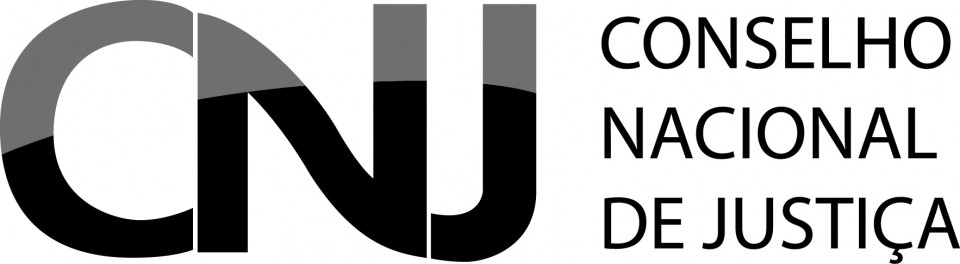
- Interactive map of National Council of Justice
- 15.803616°S 47.868997°W
- Established: December 31, 2004; 20 years ago
- Location: Brasília, Federal District, Brazil
- Coordinates: 15.803616°S 47.868997°W
- Composition method: Nomination by superior courts and the Order of Attorneys of Brazil
- Authorised by: Constitution of Brazil
- Judge term length: 2 years, renewable once
- Number of positions: 15
- Website: www.cnj.jus.br

President
- Currently: Luís Roberto Barroso
- Since: 28 September 2023

The National Council of Justice (Note: Portuguese: Conselho Nacional de Justiça [kõˈseʎu nasi.oˈnaw dʒi ʒusˈtʃisɐ, - nasjoˈnaw -].) (CNJ) is an administrative and oversight organ of the Brazilian Judiciary created by constitutional amendment in 2004 as a part of judicial reform. Among its responsibilities are ensuring that the judicial system remains autonomous, conducting disciplinary proceedings against members of the Judiciary, and compiling and publishing statistics on the Brazilian court system. The Council has nationwide jurisdiction over all courts except the Supreme Federal Court, but makes no rulings on cases and does not review judgements of other courts. Its fifteen members are chosen by the Supreme Federal Court for two-year terms.

== Founding ==
The 15-member Council was established on December 31, 2004, by the 45th Amendment to the Constitution of Brazil, and inaugurated on June 14, 2005. The President of the Council is the President of the Supreme Federal Court.

== History ==
The idea of the National Council of Justice began as an initiative of the President of the Republic in 1977 with Constitutional Amendment 7 which amended the 1967 Constitution. The initiative added the "Conselho Nacional da Magistratura" to article 112, and added a new section III, article 120 about the Conselho. It was made up of seven members of the STF, chosen by the STF itself with the participation of the Prosecutor General of the Republic for a two-year term. This was later regulated by complementary Law 35/1979 (Organic Law of the Judiciary - LOMAN). It had a disciplinary function, with national jurisdiction over complaints against members of the courts, and personnel issues such as retirement and benefits. The question of jurisdiction arose, regarding independence of the judiciary, but didn't go anywhere, and the Council was seen as only a general internal affairs office.

During the period of redemocratization in Brazil, the question arose again, with the Afonso Arinos Commission, supported by the Brazilian Bar Association, which proposed the creation of an external control "Council" with administrative and oversight duties. However, the proposal failed in the face of pressure from the national judiciary, which named fears about judicial independence, breach of the separation of powers, and absence of similar bodies in the executive or legislative branches.

In 1992, the debate was taken up once again, this time in the National Congress, at the same time as the Judiciary Reform (Reforma do Judiciário). After a lot of back-and-forth, constitutional amendment 45 was finally approved in 2004, and the CNJ was inaugurated on June 14, 2005, expanding the original disciplinary function of the Conselho, and adding administrative and planning functions. The oppositional theory that the CNJ was unconstitional because of breach of judicial independence was quashed by the STF, which ruled, in ADI 3.367, that because it does not judge any case nor have any jurisdiction over the day-to-day operation of the judiciary, there was no such issue of breach of judicial independence.

== Role and responsibility ==
The National Council of Justice is a body of the Judiciary of Brazil whose goal is to improve the work of the Brazilian judicial system, mainly with regard to control and administrative and procedural transparency. In addition, it seeks to prioritize the efficiency of judicial services, formulating and executing national judicial policies and acting in the promotion and dissemination of best practices.

=== Constitutional role ===
According to the Constitution, the CNJ is responsible for safeguarding the autonomy of the Judiciary and ensuring compliance with the Statute of the Judiciary, defining plans, goals, and institutional evaluation programs for the Judiciary, receiving complaints, electronic petitions, and representations against members or bodies of the Judiciary, judging disciplinary proceedings, and improving practices and expediency, publishing biannual statistical reports on jurisdictional activity throughout the country.

Furthermore, the CNJ develops and coordinates several national programs prioritizing areas such as the Environment, Human Rights, Technology, and Institutional Management. Among these are public judicial policies addressing violence against women, reintegrating former prison inmates, promoting of appropriate conflict resolution methods, increasing the productivity of judges and courts, late paternity recognition, adoption of children and adolescents, among others.

=== Jurisdiction and limitations ===
The role of the CNJ is purely constitutional-administrative, with financial and disciplinary control of the judiciary, but without any legislative or jurisdictional authority. It is thus forbidden to act in any way that would innovate new legal theories (ADI 3367). It is also forbidden to act as a court of cassation, or in review of any judicial decision, and in particular it is excluded from jurisdiction on questions of constitutionality.

Further, the Supreme Federal Court (STF) defined the jurisdiction of the CNJ as being below that of the STF, thus placing the STF at the top of the hierarchy of the Brazilian judiciary, and placing all acts and decisions of the Council as subject to the control of the STF. In other words, the oversight role of the Council does not include the acts and members of the STF, but does include everything else below it.

The STF confirmed (in sumula 649) that the Council has national scope, and that the states are barred from creating a local judiciary control body that is outside the framework of the national judiciary.

=== Complaints ===
Any citizen can contact the Council to file a complaint against members or bodies of the Judiciary, including auxiliary services, registry offices, and notary publics and registration services that operate under delegated or officialized public authority. No attorney is required to petition the CNJ.

== Composition ==
The council is made up of 15 members with a two-year term of office, reelection being permitted, as follows:

- the Chief Justice of the Supreme Federal Court, who presides over the Council
- one Justice of the Superior Court of Justice (STJ), who will serve as the Corregidor-Justice
- a Justice of the Superior Labour Court;
- a judge of a State Court of Justice;
- a state judge;
- a judge of a Federal Regional Court, nominated by the Superior Court of Justice;
- a federal judge;
- a judge of a Regional Labour Court;
- a labour judge;
- a member of the Federal Public Prosecutor's Office;
- a member of a state Public Prosecution;
- two lawyers, nominated by the Federal Board of the Order of Attorneys of Brazil, the Brazilian Bar Association;
- two citizens of notable juridical learning and spotless reputation, one of whom nominated by the Chamber of Deputies and the other one by the Federal Senate.

=== Presidency ===
The President of the National Council of Justice is also the Chief Justice of the Supreme Federal Court (STF), who is nominated by their peers to a two-year term.

=== Rights and duties ===
Among the rights and duties of council members established by the Constitution (art. 103-B, § 4) and the Internal Regulations (arts. 4, 17, and 18) are, among others:

- Develop projects, proposals, or studies on matters within the CNJ's competence and present them at plenary sessions or committee meetings, following the agenda set by their respective presidents;
- Request information and resources from any bodies of the Judiciary, the CNJ, or other competent authorities, which they deem useful for the exercise of their functions;
- Propose to the Presidency the creation of working groups or committees necessary for the development of studies, proposals, and projects to be presented to the Plenary;
- Propose the convening of technical experts, specialists, representatives of entities, or authorities to provide clarification deemed convenient by the CNJ;
- Request a view of case records in proceedings;
- Attend plenary sessions for which they have been regularly summoned;
- Rule on requests or documents addressed to them within the legal deadlines;
- Act as rapporteurs in cases assigned to them.

== Works cited ==
- CNJ (2006). "O que é o CNJ" [What is the CNJ?] (in Portuguese). Conselho Nacional de Justiça. Archived from the original on 2008-04-01.
- CNJ (9 November 2022) [19 January 2022], Panorama e Estrutura do Poder Judiciário Brasileiro [Overview and Structure of the Brazilian Judiciary], Brasília: Conselho Nacional de Justiça
- CNJ (24 February 2023) [3 August 2019], Quem somos - Portal CNJ [Who We are - CNJ Portal], Brasília: Conselho Nacional de Justiça
- Pansieri, Flávio (April 2022) [April 2017]. "Conselho Nacional de Justiça". In Fernandes Campilongo, Celso; de Azevedo Gonzaga, Alvaro; André Luiz Freire (eds.). Enciclopédia jurídica da PUC-SP (in Portuguese). Vol. Tomo Direito Administrativo e Constitucional (2 ed.). São Paulo: Pontifical Catholic University.
