= José Celso de Mello Filho =

Brazilian judge

His Excellency Celso de Mello
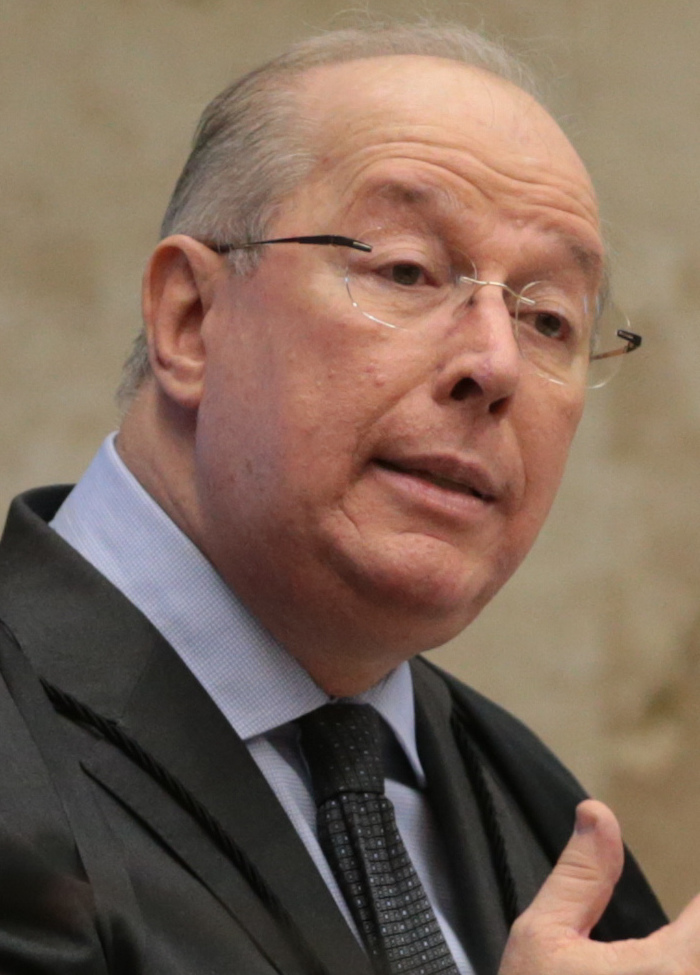

Justice of the Supreme Federal Court
- In office August 17, 1989 – October 13, 2020
- Appointed by: José Sarney
- Preceded by: Rafael Mayer
- Succeeded by: Nunes Marques

36th President of the Supreme Federal Court
- In office May 22, 1997 – May 27, 1999
- Vice President: Carlos Velloso
- Preceded by: Sepúlveda Pertence
- Succeeded by: Carlos Velloso

Personal details
- Born: November 1, 1945 (age 80) Tatuí, São Paulo, Brazil
- Spouse: Ana Maria Rangel
- Education: University of São Paulo

José Celso de Mello Filho (Tatuí, November 1, 1945), is a Brazilian jurist and professor who served as justice of the Supreme Federal Court of Brazil. He was nominated by President José Sarney in 1989.

He became the youngest President of the Court in 1997. He taught civil law at the Pontifical Catholic University of São Paulo between 1977 and 1978.

On September 25, 2020, Celso de Mello announced his early retirement to October 13, before the limit date of November 1, when the dean of the Supreme Court will turn 75.

Legal offices
Preceded by Rafael Mayer	Justice of the Supreme Federal Court; 1989–2020	Succeeded by Nunes Marques
Preceded by Sepúlveda Pertence	President of the Supreme Federal Court; 1997–1999	Succeeded by Carlos Velloso
Preceded by Sepúlveda Pertence	Vice President of the Supreme Federal Court; 1995–1997	Succeeded by Carlos Velloso
