= List of ministers of the Supreme Federal Court (Brazil) =

This is a list of ministers of the Supreme Federal Court (STF) of Brazil since its foundation as Supremo Tribunal de Justiça (Supreme Justice Court) the highest Brazilian court during the imperial period (1822–1889).

== Supremo Tribunal de Justiça – Brazilian Empire ==
Name	Provínce/State of origin
Adriano José Leal	Portugal
Adriano José Leal Filho	Bahia
Afonso Artur de Almeida Albuquerque	Portugal
Agostinho Marques Perdigão Malheiros	Portugal
Agostinho Petra de Bittencourt	Rio de Janeiro
Albino José Barbosa de Oliveira	Coimbra (Portugal)
Alexandre Bernardino dos Reis e Silva	Pernambuco
André Alves Pereira Ribeiro e Cirne	Rio de Janeiro
Antônio Augusto da Silva	Bahia
Antônio Buarque de Lima	Alagoas
Antônio Cerqueira Lima	Bahia
Antônio da Costa Pinto	Minas Gerais
Antônio da Silva Teles	Bahia
Antônio de Sousa Mendes	Piauí
Antônio Francisco de Azevedo	São Paulo
Antônio Gerardo Curado de Meneses	Ilha da Madeira (Portugal)
Antônio Inácio de Azevedo	Bahia
Antônio José da Veiga	Portugal
Antônio José de Carvalho Chaves	Portugal
Antônio José de Miranda
Antônio Luís Figueira Pereira da Cunha	Portugal
Antônio Paulino Limpo de Abreu (Visconde de Abaeté)	Lisboa (Portugal)
Antônio Pereira Barreto Pedroso	Minas Gerais
Antônio Pinto Chichorro da Gama	Bahia
Antônio Rodrigues Fernandes Braga	Rio Grande do Sul
Antônio Simões da Silva	Bahia
Caetano José da Silva Santiago	Pernambuco
Caetano Vicente de Almeida Júnior (Barão de Mucuri)	Bahia
Cândido José de Araújo Viana (Marquês de Sapucaí)	Minas Gerais
Cassiano Spiridião de Melo Matos	Bahia
Cornélio Ferreira França	Bahia
Custódio Manuel da Silva Guimarães	Ceará
Cipriano José Veloso	Bahia
Ernesto Ferreira França	Bahia
Eusébio de Queirós Coutinho da Silva	Luanda (Angola)
Firmino Pereira Monteiro	Rio de Janeiro
Francisco Alberto Teixeira de Aragão	Lisboa (Portugal)
Francisco Balthazar da Silveira	Bahia
Francisco Carneiro de Campos	Bahia
Francisco de Paula Cerqueira Leite	Minas Gerais
Francisco de Paula Pereira Duarte	Minas Gerais
Francisco Domingues da Silva	Ceará
Francisco Gomes de Campos (Barão de Campo Grande)	Rio de Janeiro
Francisco Jorge Monteiro	Bahia
Francisco José Alves Carneiro	Rio de Janeiro
Francisco José de Freitas	Bahia
Francisco Maria de Freitas e Albuquerque	Bahia
Francisco Mariani	Bahia
Francisco Soares Bernardes de Gouveia	Minas Gerais
Gustavo Adolfo d'Aguilar Pantoja	Bahia
Inácio José de Mendonça Uchoa	Alagoas
Inocêncio Marques de Araújo Góis (Barão de Araújo Góis)	Bahia
Jerônimo Martiniano Figueira de Melo	Ceará
João Antônio de Araújo Freitas Henriques	Bahia
João Antônio de Vasconcelos	Bahia
João Antônio Rodrigues de Carvalho	Rio de Janeiro
João Batista Gonçalves Campos (Visconde de Jari)	Bahia
João Carlos Leal	Bahia
João de Medeiros Gomes	Rio de Janeiro
João Evangelista de Negreiros Saião Lobato (Visconde de Sabará)	Minas Gerais
João Gomes de Campos	Rio de Janeiro
João Joaquim da Silva	Bahia
João José da Veiga	Coimbra (Portugal)
João José de Almeida Couto (Barão do Desterro)	Bahia
João José de Andrade Pinto	Rio de Janeiro
João José de Oliveira Junqueira	Bahia
João Lopes da Silva Couto	Rio de Janeiro
Joaquim Caetano da Silva Guimarães	Minas Gerais
Joaquim Francisco de Faria	Rio de Janeiro
Joaquim Francisco Gonçalves Ponce de Leão	Bahia
Joaquim José Pinheiro de Vasconcelos (Visconde de Monserrate)	Espírito Santo
Joaquim Marcelino de Brito	Bahia
Joaquim Pedro Vilaça	São Paulo
Joaquim Tibúrcio Ferreira Gomes	Bahia
Joaquim Vieira da Silva e Sousa	Maranhão
José Albano Fragoso (1º presidente)	São João Batista do Lumiar (Portugal)
José Antônio de Magalhães Castro	Bahia
José Antônio de Siqueira e Silva	Rio de Janeiro
José Ascenço da Costa Ferreira	Maranhão
José Baptista de Lisboa	Rio de Janeiro
José Bernardo de Figueiredo	Pernambuco
José da Cruz Ferreira	Rio de Janeiro
José de Assis Mascarenhas	Goiás
José Inácio Accioli de Vasconcelos	Rio de Janeiro
José Maria de Sales Gameiro de Mendonça Peçanha	Rio de Janeiro
José Mariani	Bahia
José Matoso de Andrade Câmara	Luanda (Angola)
José Paulo de Figueiroa Nabuco Araújo	Pará
José Pereira da Costa Mota	Rio de Janeiro
José Pereira da Graça (Barão de Aracati)	Ceará
José Ricardo da Costa Aguiar d'Andrada	São Paulo
José Tavares Bastos	Alagoas
José Verneque Ribeiro d'Aguilar
Lourenço José da Silva Santiago	Pernambuco
Lucas Antônio Monteiro de Barros (Visconde de Congonhas do Campo)	Minas Gerais
Luís Antônio Barbosa d'Almeida	Bahia
Luís Barbosa Accioli de Brito	Rio de Janeiro
Luís Carlos de Paiva Teixeira	Rio de Janeiro
Luís Correia de Queirós Barros	Pernambuco
Luís Gonzaga de Brito Guerra (Barão de Açu)	Rio Grande do Norte
Luís Joaquim Duque Estrada Furtado de Mendonça	Rio de Janeiro
Luís José de Sampaio	Rio Grande do Norte
Manuel Caetano d'Almeida e Albuquerque	Pernambuco
Manuel de Jesus Valdetaro (Visconde de Valdetaro)	Rio de Janeiro
Manuel dos Santos Martins Valasques	Bahia
Manuel Elisário de Castro Menezes	Ceará
Manuel Filipe Monteiro	Bahia
Manuel Inácio Cavalcanti de Lacerda (Barão de Pirapama)	Pernambuco
Manuel José de Freitas Travassos	Rio Grande do Sul
Manuel Machado Nunes	Rio de Janeiro
Manuel Messias de Leão	Bahia
Manuel Pinto Ribeiro Pereira de Sampaio	Espírito Santo
Manuel Rodrigues Vilares	São Paulo
Miguel Joaquim de Castro Mascarenhas	Bahia
Olegário Herculano d'Aquino e Castro	São Paulo
Ovídio Fernandes Trigo de Loureiro	São Paulo
Monsenhor Pedro Machado de Miranda Malheiros	Portugal
Silvério Fernandes de Araújo Jorge	Alagoas
Tomás Antônio Maciel Monteiro (Barão de Itamaracá)	Pernambuco
Tomás Xavier Garcia d'Almeida	Rio Grande do Norte
Tibúrcio Valeriano da Silva Tavares	Bahia
Tristão de Alencar Araripe	Ceará
Viriato Bandeira Duarte	Maranhão

Legenda:	Ministers who joined STF

== Supremo Tribunal Federal – Republic ==
STF, in its initial composition had fifteen ministers. Decree n.º 19.656, Provisory Government act of 1931, reduced the number of ministers to eleven. The AI-2, of 1965, raised the number of ministers to 16. In 1969, AI-6 returned the composition to eleven ministers, which stays until this day.

Justice		Seat	Replacing	Tenure	Appointed by	Prior position
1	João Negreiros Saião, Viscount of Sabará	1st	(new seat)	28 February 1891 – 4 May 1892 (Retired)	Deodoro da Fonseca	Justice of the Superior Court of Justice
2	Freitas Henriques	2nd	(new seat)	28 February 1891 – 9 February 1894 (Retired)	Deodoro da Fonseca	Justice of the Superior Court of Justice
3	Alencar Araripe	3rd	(new seat)	28 February 1891 – 25 January 1892 (Retired)	Deodoro da Fonseca	Justice of the Superior Court of Justice
4	João de Andrade Pinto	4th	(new seat)	28 February 1891 – 8 October 1894 (Retired)	Deodoro da Fonseca	Justice of the Superior Court of Justice
5	Aquino e Castro	5th	(new seat)	28 February 1891 – 10 August 1906 (Died)	Deodoro da Fonseca	Justice of the Superior Court of Justice
6	Joaquim Francisco de Faria	6th	(new seat)	28 February 1891 – 1 February 1892 (Retired)	Deodoro da Fonseca	Justice of the Superior Court of Justice
7	Mendonça Uchôa	7th	(new seat)	28 February 1891 – 25 March 1892 (Retired)	Deodoro da Fonseca	Justice of the Superior Court of Justice
8	Queiroz Barros	8th	(new seat)	28 February 1891 – 15 March 1892 (Retired)	Deodoro da Fonseca	Justice of the Superior Court of Justice
9	Sousa Mendes	9th	(new seat)	28 February 1891 – 6 May 1892 (Retired)	Deodoro da Fonseca	Justice of the Superior Court of Justice
10	Trigo de Loureiro	10th	(new seat)	28 February 1891 – 29 September 1894 (Retired)	Deodoro da Fonseca	Justice of the Superior Court of Justice
11	Costa Barradas	11th	(new seat)	28 February 1891 – 21 October 1893 (Retired)	Deodoro da Fonseca	Judge of law
12	Luís Pereira Franco, Baron of Pereira Franco	12th	(new seat)	28 February 1891 – 20 January 1902 (Died)	Deodoro da Fonseca	Desembargador of the Federal District Court of Appeals
13	Henrique Pereira de Lucena, Baron of Lucena	13th	(new seat)	28 February 1891 – 25 January 1892 (Retired)	Deodoro da Fonseca	Governor of Pernambuco
14	José Albuquerque Barros, Baron of Sobral	14th	(new seat)	28 February 1891 – 31 August 1893 (Died)	Deodoro da Fonseca	Director-general of the Secretariat of Justice Affairs
15	Piza e Almeida	15th	(new seat)	1 April 1891 – 22 April 1908 (Died)	Deodoro da Fonseca	Judge of law
16	Macedo Soares	3rd	Araripe	29 January 1892 – 14 August 1905 (Died)	Floriano Peixoto	Judge of the Federal District Court of Appeals
17	Barros Pimentel	13th	Lucena	29 January 1892 – 18 November 1893 (Retired)	Floriano Peixoto	Desembargador of the Federal District Court of Appeals
18	Anfilófio de Carvalho	6th	Faria	1 March 1892 – 3 April 1895 (Retired)	Floriano Peixoto	Federal Deputy from Bahia
19	José Higino	1st	Sabará	4 June 1897 – 7 June 1897 (Retired)	Floriano Peixoto	Minister of Justice and Interior Affairs (acting)
20	Bento Lisboa	7th	Uchôa	4 June 1892 – 18 November 1893 (Retired)	Floriano Peixoto	Judge of the Federal District Court of Appeals
21	Ferreira de Resende	9th	S. Mendes	28 June 1892 – 26 October 1893 (Died)	Floriano Peixoto	Vice Governor of Minas Gerais
22	Faria Lemos	8th	Q. Barros	4 June 1893 – 11 January 1894 (Retired)	Floriano Peixoto	President of Minas Gerais
23	Barata Ribeiro	14th	J. A. Barros	25 November 1893 – 24 September 1894 (Rejected by the Senate)	Floriano Peixoto	Mayor of the Federal District
24	Bernardino Ferreira	7th	Lisboa	4 June 1892 – 24 October 1905 (Died)	Floriano Peixoto	Justice of the Military Supreme Council
25	Sousa Martins	9th	Resende	10 October 1894 – 25 December 1896 (Died)	Floriano Peixoto	Justice of the Military Supreme Council
26	Pindaíba de Matos	11th	Barradas	10 October 1894 – 27 December 1910 (Retired)	Floriano Peixoto	Desembargador of the Federal District Court of Appeals
27	Hermínio do Espírito Santo	13th	Pimentel	17 November 1894 – 11 November 1924 (Died)	Floriano Peixoto	Federal judge
28	Américo Brasiliense	8th	Lemos	24 November 1894 – 25 March 1896 (Died)	Floriano Peixoto	President of São Paulo
29	Luís Osório	2nd	Henriques	28 November 1894 – 26 November 1896 (Died)	Floriano Peixoto	Brazilian Ambassador to Argentina
30	Américo Lobo	15th	B. Ribeiro	8 December 1894 – 1 October 1903 (Died)	Floriano Peixoto	Senator for Minas Gerais
31	Ubaldino do Amaral	10th	Loureiro	15 December 1894 – 4 May 1896 (Retired)	Prudente de Morais	Senator for Paraná
32	Lúcio de Mendonça	4th	J. A. Pinto	24 April 1895 – 26 October 1907 (Retired)	Prudente de Morais	Director-general of the Secretariat of Justice Affairs
33	Figueiredo Júnior	6th	A. de Carvalho	11 December 1895 – 23 August 1897 (Retired)	Prudente de Morais	Attorney
34	Ribeiro de Almeida	8th	Brasiliense	24 June 1896 – 30 September 1913 (Retired)	Prudente de Morais	Desembargador of the Federal District Court of Appeals
35	João Pedro Belford	2nd	Osório	20 January 1897 – 2 November 1910 (Died)	Manuel Vitorino	Senator for Maranhão
36	João Barbalho	10th	Amaral	20 January 1897 – 16 April 1906 (Retired)	Manuel Vitorino	Senator for Pernambuco
37	Manuel Murtinho	9th	Martins	23 January 1897 – 22 April 1917 (Died)	Manuel Vitorino	President of Mato Grosso
38	André Cavalcanti de Albuquerque	1st	Higino	12 June 1897 – 13 February 1927 (Died)	Prudente de Morais	Judge of the Federal District
39	Augusto Olinto	6th	F. Júnior	8 September 1897 – 12 August 1898 (Died)	Prudente de Morais	Judge of law
40	Gonçalves de Carvalho	6th	Olinto	1 September 1901 – 18 January 1901 (Died)	Prudente de Morais	Judge of the Federal District Court of Appeals
41	Alberto Torres	6th	G. de Carvalho	18 May 1901 – 18 September 1909 (Retired)	Campos Sales	President of Rio de Janeiro
42	Epitácio Pessoa	12th	Pereira Franco	28 January 1902 – 17 August 1912 (Retired)	Campos Sales	Minister of Justice and Interior Affairs
43	Oliveira Ribeiro	14th	Lobo	14 October 1903 – 29 June 1917 (Died)	Rodrigues Alves	Desembargador of the Court of Justice of São Paulo
44	Guimarães Natal	3rd	Soares	23 September 1905 – 13 April 1927 (Retired)	Rodrigues Alves	Federal judge
45	Cardoso de Castro	7th	Ferreira	11 November 1905 – 26 October 1911 (Died)	Rodrigues Alves	Chief Police of the Federal District
46	Amaro Cavalcanti	10th	Barbalho	27 June 1906 – 30 December 1914 (Retired)	Rodrigues Alves	Legal advisor to the Ministry of Foreign Affairs
47	Manuel Espíndola	5th	A. Castro	29 September 1906 – 7 October 1912 (Died)	Rodrigues Alves	Desembargador of the Federal District Court of Appeals
48	Pedro Lessa	4th	L. Mendonça	20 November 1907 – 25 July 1921 (Died)	Afonso Pena	Attorney
49	Canuto Saraiva	15th	P. Almeida	16 June 1908 – 25 May 1919 (Died)	Afonso Pena	Desembargador of the Court of Justice of São Paulo
50	Godofredo Cunha	6th^{[D-1931]}	Torres	25 September 1909 – 18 February 1931 (Retired)	Nilo Peçanha	Federal judge
51	Leoni Ramos	2nd	Belfort	22 November 1910 – 20 March 1931 (Died)	Nilo Peçanha	Chief Police of the Federal District
52	Muniz Barreto	11th^{[D-1931]}	Matos	31 December 1910 – 18 February 1931 (Retired)	Hermes da Fonseca	Desembargador of the Federal District Court of Appeals
53	Oliveira Figueiredo	7th	C. Castro	11 November 1911 – 29 October 1912 (Died)	Hermes da Fonseca	Senator for Rio de Janeiro
54	Enéas Galvão	12th	Pessoa	24 August 1912 – 24 November 1916 (Died)	Hermes da Fonseca	Desembargador of the Federal District Court of Appeals
55	Pedro Mibielli	5th^{[D-1931]}	Espíndola	13 November 1912 – 18 February 1931 (Retired)	Hermes da Fonseca	Desembargador of the Court of Justice of Rio Grande do Sul
56	Sebastião Lacerda	7th	Figueiredo	16 November 1912 – 5 July 1925 (Died)	Hermes da Fonseca	State Deputy of Rio de Janeiro
57	Coelho e Campos	8th	R. Almeida	1 November 1913 – 13 October 1919 (Died)	Hermes da Fonseca	Senate for Sergipe
58	Viveiros de Castro	10th	A. Cavalcanti	3 February 1915 – 14 April 1927 (Died)	Venceslau Brás	Minister of the Federal Court of Accounts
59	João Mendes	12th	Galvão	5 January 1917 – 24 October 1922 (Retired)	Venceslau Brás	Professor at the Law School, University of São Paulo
60	Pires e Albuquerque	9th^{[D-1931]}	Murtinho	26 May 1917 – 18 February 1931 (Retired)	Venceslau Brás	Federal judge
61	Edmundo Lins	14th	O. Ribeiro	12 September 1917 – 16 November 1937 (Retired)	Venceslau Brás	Desembargador of the Court of Justice of Minas Gerais
62	Hermenegildo de Barros	15th	Saraiva	26 July 1919 – 16 November 1937 (Retired)	Delfim Moreira	Desembargador of the Court of Justice of Minas Gerais
63	Pedro dos Santos	8th	Campos	29 November 1919 – 18 February 1931 (Retired)	Epitácio Pessoa	Desembargador of the Court of Justice of Bahia
64	Alfredo Pinto	4th	Lessa	21 September 1921 – 8 July 1923 (Died)	Epitácio Pessoa	Minister of Justice and Interior Affairs
65	Geminiano da Franca	12th	Mendes	22 November 1922 – 18 February 1931 (Retired)	Epitácio Pessoa	Chief Police of the Federal District
66	Arthur Ribeiro	4th	A. Pinto	6 August 1923 – 24 March 1936 (Died)	Artur Bernardes	Desembargador of the Court of Justice of Minas Gerais
67	João Luís Alves	13th	Espírito Santo	24 January 1925 – 15 November 1925 (Died)	Artur Bernardes	Minister of Justice and Interior Affairs
68	Bento de Faria	7th	Lacerda	19 August 1925 – 25 May 1945 (Retired)	Artur Bernardes	Attorney
69	Herculano de Freitas	13th	J. Alves	28 January 1926 – 14 May 1926 (Died)	Artur Bernardes	Federal Deputy from São Paulo
70	Heitor de Sousa	13th	Freitas	2 July 1926 – 11 January 1929 (Died)	Artur Bernardes	Federal Deputy from Espírito Santo
71	Soriano Sousa	1st	A. C. Albuquerque	25 February 1927 – 20 July 1933 (Retired)	Washington Luís	Desembargador of the Court of Justice of São Paulo
72	Cardoso Ribeiro	3rd	Natal	25 May 1927 – 16 May 1932 (Died)	Washington Luís	Desembargador of the Court of Justice of São Paulo
73	Firmino Whitaker	10th	V. Castro	6 June 1927 – 5 March 1934 (Died)	Washington Luís	Desembargador of the Court of Justice of São Paulo
74	Rodrigo Otávio	13th	H. Sousa	8 February 1929 – 7 February 1934 (Retired)	Washington Luís	Consultant General of the Republic
75	Eduardo Espínola	8th	P. Santos	13 May 1931 – 25 May 1945 (Retired)	Getúlio Vargas	Attorney
76	Plínio Casado	12th	Franca	4 June 1931 – 1 October 1938 (Retired)	Getúlio Vargas	Federal Interventor of Rio de Janeiro
77	Carvalho Mourão	2nd	Ramos	8 June 1931 – 10 December 1940 (Retired)	Getúlio Vargas	Dean of the Federal University of Rio de Janeiro
78	Laudo de Camargo	3rd	C. Ribeiro	9 June 1932 – 25 April 1951 (Retired)	Getúlio Vargas	Desembargador of the Court of Justice of São Paulo
79	Costa Manso	1st	S. Sousa	28 August 1933 – 3 May 1939 (Retired)	Getúlio Vargas	Desembargador of the Court of Justice of São Paulo
80	Otávio Kelly	13th	Otávio	14 February 1934 – 30 July 1942 (Retired)	Getúlio Vargas	Federal judge
81	Ataulfo de Paiva	10th	Whitaker	20 March 1934 – 16 December 1937 (Retired)	Getúlio Vargas	Desembargador of the Federal District Court of Appeals
82	Carlos Maximiliano	4th	A. Ribeiro	4 May 1936 – 13 June 1941 (Retired)	Getúlio Vargas	Prosecutor General of the Republic
83	Armando de Alencar	14th	Lins	22 November 1937 – 6 May 1941 (Retired)	Getúlio Vargas	Desembargador of the Federal District Court of Appeals
84	Francisco Cunha Melo	15th	Barros	24 November 1937 – 1 April 1942 (Retired)	Getúlio Vargas	Federal judge
85	José Linhares	10th	A. Paiva	24 December 1937 – 29 January 1956 (Retired)	Getúlio Vargas	Desembargador of the Federal District Court of Appeals
86	Washington de Oliveira	12th	Casado	12 October 1938 – 17 June 1940 (Retired)	Getúlio Vargas	Federal judge
87	Barros Barreto	1st	Manso	17 May 1939 – 20 May 1963 (Retired)	Getúlio Vargas	Desembargador of the Federal District Court of Appeals
88	Aníbal Freire	12th	W. Oliveira	26 June 1940 – 17 May 1951 (Retired)	Getúlio Vargas	Consultant General of the Republic
89	Castro Nunes	2nd	Mourão	18 December 1940 – 2 September 1949 (Retired)	Getúlio Vargas	Minister of the Federal Court of Accounts
90	Orozimbo Nonato	14th	Alencar	21 May 1941 – 27 January 1960 (Retired)	Getúlio Vargas	Consultant General of the Republic
91	Waldemar Falcão	4th	Maximiliano	18 June 1941 – 2 October 1946 (Died)	Getúlio Vargas	Minister of Labour
92	Goulart de Oliveira	15th	C. Melo	15 April 1942 – 28 May 1950 (Died)	Getúlio Vargas	Desembargador of the Federal District Court of Appeals
93	Filadelfo e Azevedo	13th	O. Kelly	16 August 1942 – 26 January 1946 (Retired)	Getúlio Vargas	Professor at the National Law School
94	Edgard Costa	7th	B. Faria	8 November 1945 – 19 January 1957 (Retired)	José Linhares	Desembargador of the Federal District Court of Appeals
95	Lafayette de Andrada	8th^{[AI-6]}	Espínola	8 November 1945 – 3 February 1969 (Retired)	José Linhares	Desembargador of the Federal District Court of Appeals
96	Ribeiro da Costa	13th	F. Azevedo	30 January 1946 – 5 December 1966 (Retired)	José Linhares	Chief of Police of the Federal District
97	Hahnemann Guimarães	4th	W. Falcão	30 October 1946 – 3 October 1967 (Retired)	Gaspar Dutra	Prosecutor General of the Republic
98	Luís Gallotti	2nd	Nunes	22 September 1949 – 16 August 1974 (Retired)	Gaspar Dutra	Prosecutor General of the Republic
99	Rocha Lagoa	15th	G. Oliveira	16 June 1950 – 19 November 1960 (Retired)	Gaspar Dutra	Justice of the Federal Court of Appeals
100	Mário Guimarães	3rd	Camargo	28 May 1951 – 10 April 1956 (Retired)	Getúlio Vargas	Desembargador of the Court of Justice of São Paulo
101	Nelson Hungria	12th	Freire	4 June 1951 – 11 April 1961 (Retired)	Getúlio Vargas	Desembargador of the Federal District Court of Appeals
102	Ary Franco	10th	Linhares	1 February 1956 – 17 July 1963 (Died)	Nereu Ramos	Desembargador of the Court of Justice of Rio de Janeiro
103	Cândido Mota	3rd	M. Guimarães	2 May 1956 – 18 September 1967 (Retired)	Juscelino Kubitschek	President of the Republican Party
104	Antonio Vilas Boas	7th	E. Costa	20 February 1957 – 25 November 1966 (Retired)	Juscelino Kubitschek	Desembargador of the Court of Justice of Minas Gerais
105	Antônio Gonçalves de Oliveira	14th^{[AI-6]}	Nonato	15 February 1960 – 3 February 1969 (Retired)	Juscelino Kubitschek	Consultant General of the Republic
106	Victor Nunes Leal	15th^{[AI-6]}	Lagoa	7 December 1960 – 16 January 1969 (Retired)	Juscelino Kubitschek	Chief of Staff of the Presidency
107	Pedro Chaves	12th	Hungria	26 April 1961 – 5 June 1967 (Retired)	Jânio Quadros	Desembargador of the Court of Justice of São Paulo
108	Hermes Lima	1st^{[AI-6]}	Barreto	26 June 1963 – 19 January 1969 (Retired)	João Goulart	Prime Minister of Brazil
109	Evandro Lins e Silva	10th^{[AI-6]}	A. Franco	4 September 1963 – 16 January 1969 (Retired)	João Goulart	Minister of Foreign Affairs
110	Adalício Nogueira	16th^{[AI-2]}	(new seat)	25 November 1965 – 24 February 1972 (Retired)	Castelo Branco	Desembargador of the Court of Justice of Bahia
111	Prado Kelly	17th^{[AI-2]}	(new seat)	25 November 1965 – 18 January 1968 (Retired)	Castelo Branco	President of the Order of Attorneys of Brazil Federal Council
112	Osvaldo Trigueiro	18th^{[AI-2]}	(new seat)	25 November 1965 – 3 January 1975 (Retired)	Castelo Branco	Prosecutor General of the Republic
113	Aliomar Baleeiro	19th^{[AI-2]}	(new seat)	25 November 1965 – 2 May 1975 (Retired)	Castelo Branco	Federal Deputy from Guanabara
114	Carlos Medeiros	20th^{[AI-2]}	(new seat)	25 November 1965 – 18 July 1966 (Resigned)	Castelo Branco	Federal Councillor of the Order of Attorneys of Brazil
115	Elói Rocha	20th	Medeiros	15 September 1966 – 3 June 1977 (Retired)	Castelo Branco	Desembargador of the Court of Justice of Rio Grande do Sul
116	Djaci Falcão	7th	Vilas Boas	21 February 1967 – 26 January 1989 (Retired)	Castelo Branco	Desembargador of the Court of Justice of Pernambuco
117	Adauto Cardoso	13th	R. Costa	2 March 1967 – 18 March 1971 (Retired)	Castelo Branco	Federal Deputy from Guanabara
118	Barros Monteiro	12th	Chaves	7 July 1967 – 3 May 1974 (Died)	Costa e Silva	Desembargador of the Court of Justice of São Paulo
119	Amaral Santos	3rd	Mota	18 October 1967 – 25 July 1972 (Retired)	Costa e Silva	Professor at the University of São Paulo
120	Themístocles Cavalcanti	4th	H. Guimarães	18 October 1967 – 14 October 1969 (Retired)	Costa e Silva	Deputy of the Constituent Assembly of Guanabara
121	Thompson Flores	17th	P. Kelly	14 March 1968 – 26 January 1981 (Retired)	Costa e Silva	Desembargador of the Court of Justice of Rio Grande do Sul
122	Bilac Pinto	4th	T. Cavalcanti	17 June 1970 – 9 February 1978 (Retired)	Emílio Médici	Brazilian Ambassador to France
123	Antônio Neder	13th	A. Cardoso	28 April 1971 – 10 June 1981 (Retired)	Emílio Médici	Justice of the Federal Court of Appeals
124	Xavier de Albuquerque	16th	Nogueira	19 April 1972 – 21 February 1983 (Retired)	Emílio Médici	Prosecutor General of the Republic
125	Rodrigues Alckmin	3rd	A. Santos	11 October 1972 – 6 November 1978 (Died)	Emílio Médici	Desembargador of the Court of Justice of São Paulo
126	Leitão de Abreu	12th	B. Monteiro	17 June 1974 – 11 August 1981 (Retired)	Ernesto Geisel	Chief of Staff of the Presidency
127	Cordeiro Guerra	2nd	L. Gallotti	26 September 1974 – 18 March 1986 (Retired)	Ernesto Geisel	Prosecutor of Guanabara
128	Moreira Alves	18th	Trigueiro	20 June 1975 – 20 April 2003 (Retired)	Ernesto Geisel	Prosecutor General of the Republic
129	Cunha Peixoto	19th	Baleeiro	4 July 1975 – 9 December 1981 (Retired)	Ernesto Geisel	Desembargador of the Court of Justice of Minas Gerais
130	Pedro Soares Muñoz	20th	E. Rocha	8 August 1977 – 5 November 1984 (Retired)	Ernesto Geisel	Desembargador of the Court of Justice of Rio Grande do Sul
131	Décio Miranda	4th	B. Pinto	27 June 1978 – 2 September 1985 (Retired)	Ernesto Geisel	Justice of the Federal Court of Appeals
132	Rafael Mayer	3rd	Alckmin	15 December 1978 – 14 March 1989 (Retired)	Ernesto Geisel	Consultant General of the Republic
133	Clóvis Ramalhete	17th	Flores	8 April 1981 – 25 February 1982 (Retired)	João Figueiredo	Consultant General of the Republic
134	Firmino Paz	13th	Neder	24 June 1981 – 17 July 1982 (Retired)	João Figueiredo	Prosecutor General of the Republic
135	Néri da Silveira	12th	L. Abreu	1 September 1981 – 24 April 2002 (Retired)	João Figueiredo	Justice of the Federal Court of Appeals
136	Alfredo Buzaid	19th	C. Peixoto	30 March 1982 – 20 July 1984 (Retired)	João Figueiredo	Minister of Justice
137	Oscar Correia	17th	Ramalhete	26 April 1982 – 17 January 1989 (Resigned)	João Figueiredo	Federal Councillor of the Order of Attorneys of Brazil
138	Aldir Passarinho	13th	Paz	2 September 1982 – 22 April 1991 (Retired)	João Figueiredo	Justice of the Federal Court of Appeals
139	Francisco Rezek	16th	X. Albuquerque	24 March 1983 – 15 March 1990 (Resigned)	João Figueiredo	Prosecutor of the Republic
140	Sydney Sanches	19th	Buzaid	31 August 1984 – 27 April 2003 (Retired)	João Figueiredo	Desembargador of the Court of Justice of São Paulo
141	Octavio Gallotti	20th	Muñoz	20 November 1984 – 28 October 2000 (Retired)	João Figueiredo	Minister of the Federal Court of Accounts
142	Carlos Madeira	4th	Miranda	19 September 1985 – 17 March 2000 (Retired)	José Sarney	Justice of the Federal Court of Appeals
143	Célio Borja	2nd	C. Guerra	14 April 1986 – 31 March 1992 (Resigned)	José Sarney	Special advisor to the Presidency
144	Paulo Brossard	7th	D. Falcão	5 April 1989 – 24 October 1994 (Retired)	José Sarney	Minister of Justice
145	Sepúlveda Pertence	17th	O. Correia	17 May 1989 – 17 August 2007 (Retired)	José Sarney	Prosecutor General of the Republic
146	Celso de Mello	3rd	Mayer	17 August 1989 – 13 October 2020 (Retired)	José Sarney	Prosecutor of São Paulo
147	Marco Aurélio Mello	4th	Madeira	13 June 1990 – 12 July 2021 (Retired)	José Sarney	Justice of the Superior Labour Court
148	Carlos Velloso	16th	Rezek	13 June 1990 – 19 January 2006 (Retired)	Fernando Collor	Justice of the Superior Court of Justice
149	Ilmar Galvão	13th	Passarinho	26 June 1991 – 3 May 2003 (Retired)	Fernando Collor	Justice of the Superior Court of Justice
150	Francisco Rezek	2nd	Borja	21 May 1992 – 5 February 1997 (Retired)	Fernando Collor	Minister of Foreign Affairs
151	Maurício Corrêa	7th	Brossard	15 December 1994 – 8 May 2004 (Retired)	Itamar Franco	Minister of Justice
152	Nelson Jobim	2nd	Rezek	15 April 1997 – 29 March 2006 (Retired)	Fernando Henrique Cardoso	Minister of Justice
153	Ellen Gracie	20th	O. Gallotti	14 December 2000 – 8 August 2011 (Retired)	Fernando Henrique Cardoso	Desembargadora of the Reginal Federal Court of the 4th Region
154	Gilmar Mendes	12th	Silveira	20 June 2002 – Incumbent	Fernando Henrique Cardoso	Attorney General of the Union
155	Ayres Britto	13th	Galvão	25 June 2003 – 18 November 2012 (Retired)	Luiz Inácio Lula da Silva	Professor at the Federal University of Sergipe
156	Joaquim Barbosa	18th	M. Alves	25 June 2003 – 31 July 2014 (Retired)	Luiz Inácio Lula da Silva	Prosecutor of the Republic
157	Cezar Peluso	19th	Sanches	25 June 2003 – 3 September 2012 (Retired)	Luiz Inácio Lula da Silva	Desembargador of the Court of Justice of São Paulo
158	Eros Grau	7th	M. Corrêa	30 June 2004 – 2 August 2010 (Retired)	Luiz Inácio Lula da Silva	Professor at the University of São Paulo
159	Ricardo Lewandowski	16th	Velloso	16 March 2006 – 11 April 2023 (Retired)	Luiz Inácio Lula da Silva	Desembargador of the Court of Justice of São Paulo
160	Cármen Lúcia	2nd	Jobim	21 June 2006 – Incumbent	Luiz Inácio Lula da Silva	Prosecutor of Minas Gerais
161	Menezes Direito	17th	Pertence	5 September 2007 – 1 September 2009 (Died)	Luiz Inácio Lula da Silva	Justice of the Superior Court of Justice
162	Dias Toffoli	17th	Direito	23 October 2009 – Incumbent	Luiz Inácio Lula da Silva	Attorney General of the Union
163	Luiz Fux	7th	Grau	2 March 2011 – Incumbent	Dilma Rousseff	Justice of the Superior Court of Justice
164	Rosa Weber	20th	Gracie	19 December 2011 – 30 September 2023 (Retired)	Dilma Rousseff	Justice of the Superior Labour Court
165	Teori Zavascki	19th	Peluso	29 November 2012 – 19 January 2017 (Died)	Dilma Rousseff	Justice of the Superior Court of Justice
166	Luís Roberto Barroso	13th	Britto	26 June 2013 – 18 October 2025 (Retired)	Dilma Rousseff	Prosecutor of Rio de Janeiro
167	Edson Fachin	18th	Barbosa	16 June 2015 – Incumbent	Dilma Rousseff	Professor at the Federal University of Paraná
168	Alexandre de Moraes	19th	Zavascki	22 March 2017 – Incumbent	Michel Temer	Minister of Justice
169	Nunes Marques	3rd	C. Mello	5 November 2020 – Incumbent	Jair Bolsonaro	Desembargador of the Regional Federal Court of the 1st Region
170	André Mendonça	4th	M. A. Mello	16 December 2021 – Incumbent	Jair Bolsonaro	Attorney General of the Union
171	Cristiano Zanin	16th	Lewandowski	3 August 2023 – Incumbent	Luiz Inácio Lula da Silva	Attorney
172	Flávio Dino	20th	Weber	22 February 2024 – Incumbent	Luiz Inácio Lula da Silva	Minister of Justice

Legend

Ministers who were also STF presidents	Current member and former president of STF	Member and current president of STF
Current STF member	Member and current vice-president of STF

- AI-6. Seat closed by AI-6 in 1969.
- D-1931. Seat closed by decree nº 19.711 in 1931.
- AI-2. Seat created by AI-2 in 1965.
