= Octavio Gallotti =

Brazilian judge (1930–2026)

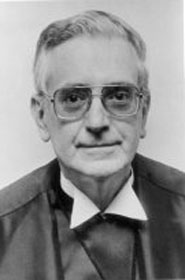

President of the Supreme Federal Court
- In office 13 May 1993 – 16 May 1995
- Preceded by: Sydney Sanches
- Succeeded by: Sepúlveda Pertence
- In office 21 March 1991 – 9 May 1991
- Preceded by: Sydney Sanches
- Succeeded by: Célio Borja

Minister of the Supreme Federal Court
- In office 20 November 1984 – 28 October 2000
- Appointed by: João Figueiredo
- Preceded by: Pedro Soares Muñoz
- Succeeded by: Ellen Gracie Northfleet

Personal details
- Born: Luiz Octavio Pires e Albuquerque Gallotti; 27 October 1930 Rio de Janeiro, Brazil
- Died: 26 July 2026 (aged 95) Brasília, Brazil
- Education: Federal University of Rio de Janeiro Faculty of Law
- Occupation: Judge

Luiz Octavio Pires e Albuquerque Gallotti (27 October 1930 – 26 July 2026) was a Brazilian judge. He served as a Minister of the Supreme Federal Court from 1984 to 2000 and served as its President from March to May 1991 and from 1993 to 1995.

Gallotti died in Brasília on 26 July 2026, at the age of 95.
