= RE 1224374 =

Supreme Court of Brazil case on the legality of refusing breathalyzer

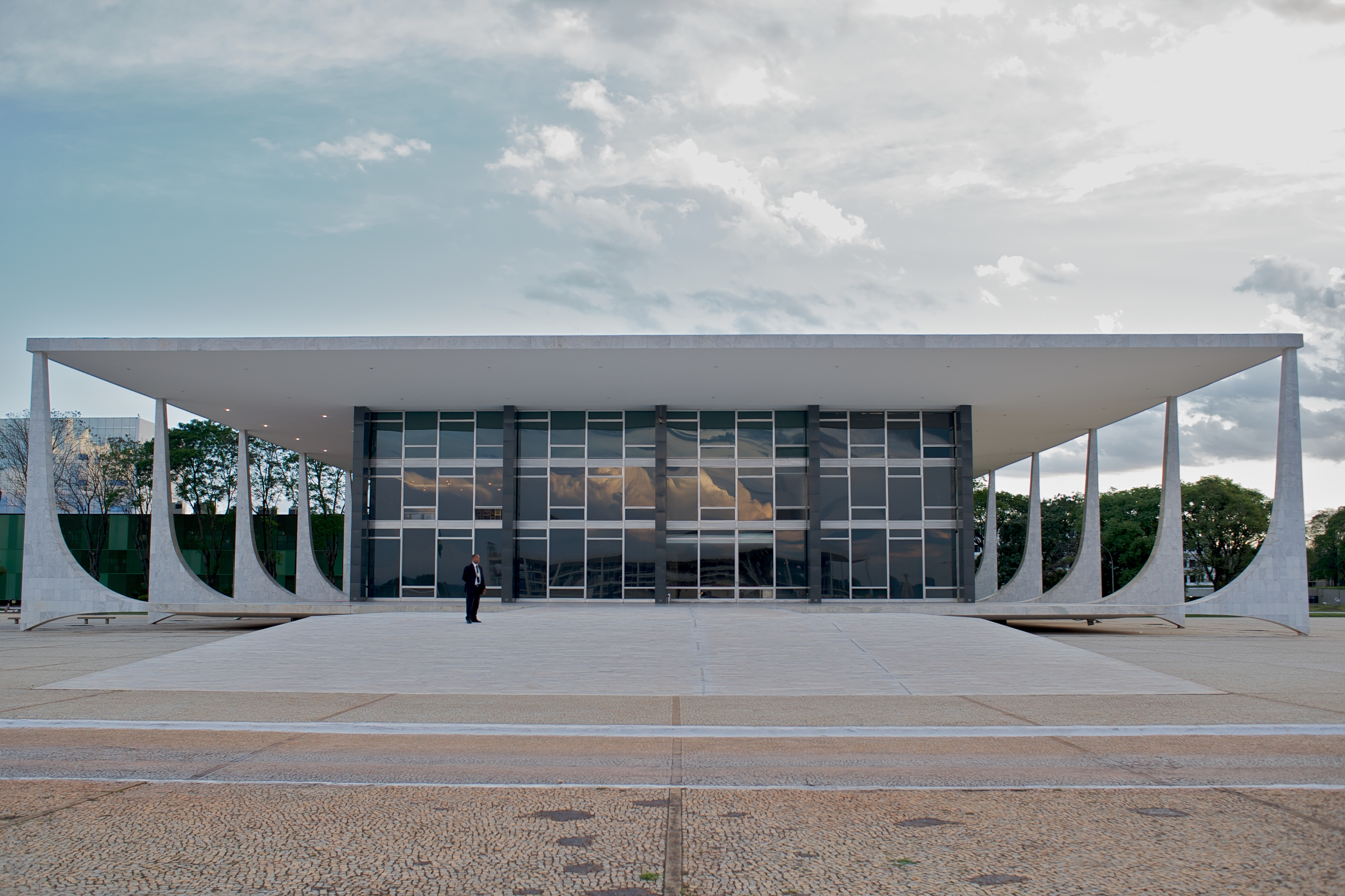
- Court: Supreme Federal Court
- Full case name: Recurso Extraordinário 1.224.374 (Transit State Department-RS v. Joel Porn de Freitas)
- Started: 14 August 2019
- Decided: 19 May 2022

Court membership
- Judges sitting: President Luiz Fux Justices: Luís Roberto Barroso; Edson Fachin; Ricardo Lewandowski; Cármen Lúcia; Nunes Marques; Gilmar Mendes; André Mendonça; Alexandre de Moraes; Dias Toffoli; Rosa Weber

Case opinions
- Decision by: Fux
- Concurrence: Barroso, Fachin, Lewandowski, Lúcia, Marques, Mendes, Mendonça, de Moraes, Toffoli, Weber

Keywords
- Drunk driving; Sobriety testing

RE 1.224.374 was a case of the Supreme Court of Brazil concerning the constitutionality of penalizing refusal to submit oneself to drug influence tests on traffic stops, such as a breathalyzer. The case's rapporteur, minister Luiz Fux, cast the initial vote and the Court unanimously agreed, upholding the constitutionality of such penalties.

The case was judged alongside ADI 4017 and ADI 4103, both regarding the constitutionality of prohibiting the sale of alcoholic beverages alongside highways and its inspection by the Highway Police.

== Background ==
The case was brought to the Supreme Court after the Transit State Department of Rio Grande do Sul challenged a decision by the state's Court of Justice (TJ-RS) to reverse penalties imposed upon a driver that refused a breathalyzer test.

Specifically, the case put into question the constitutionality of Article 165-A of the Brazilian Transit Code:

Art. 165-A. Recusar-se a ser submetido a teste, exame clínico, perícia ou outro procedimento que permita certificar influência de álcool ou outra substância psicoativa, na forma estabelecida pelo art. 277:

Infração - gravíssima;

Penalidade - multa (dez vezes) e suspensão do direito de dirigir por 12 (doze) meses;

Medida administrativa - recolhimento do documento de habilitação e retenção do veículo, observado o disposto no § 4º do art. 270.

Parágrafo único. Aplica-se em dobro a multa prevista no caput em caso de reincidência no período de até 12 (doze) meses.

Art. 165-A. Refusing to submit to a test, clinical exam, investigation or other procedure that certifies influence of alcohol or other psychoactive substance, as established by art. 277:

Infraction - very grave;

Penalty - fine (ten times) and suspension of the right to drive for 12 (twelve) months;

Administrative measure - withdrawal of driver's license and seizure of vehicle, following § 4 of art. 270.

Single paragraph. The fine prescribed on the caput is doubled in case of reincidence in the period of up to 12 (twelve) months.

— Law 9.503/1997 (Brazilian Transit Code)

The argument against the constitutionality of the article was that penalizing the refusal to test for inebriation would restrict the accused's defense, and could lead to self-incrimination.

== High Court decision ==
The Court unanimously ruled that, since the refusal does not constitute a crime and is instead only penalized by administrative sanctions, there is no violation of the principle of no self-incrimination. Additionally, it was decided that sanctioning test refusal is an effective means of enforcing the law.

=== Judiciary representation ===
Supreme Court members	Ministers	Yes	No
Luiz Fux	1	1	
Luís Roberto Barroso	1	1	
Edson Fachin	1	1	
Ricardo Lewandowski	1	1	
Cármen Lúcia	1	1	
Nunes Marques	1	1	
Gilmar Mendes	1	1	
André Mendonça	1	1	
Alexandre de Moraes	1	1	
Dias Toffoli	1	1	
Rosa Weber	1	1	
Total	11	11	00

== See also ==
- Driving under the influence
