= Noites do Terror =

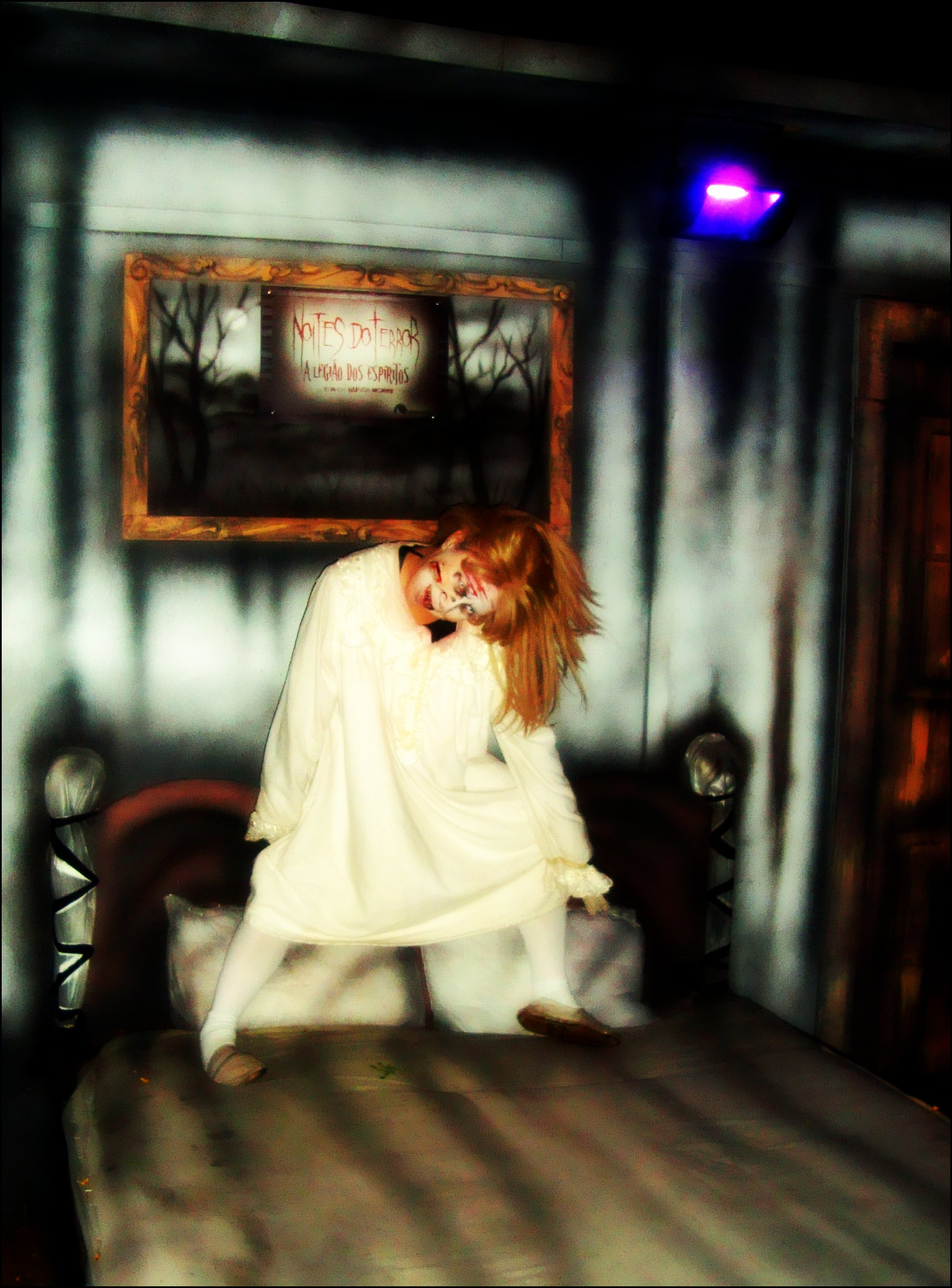
- a Actress dressed as a ghost
- Status: Ended
- Genre: Horror Fiction
- Begins: 1988
- Ends: 2012
- Location: Playcenter
- Country: Brazil
- Organizer: Grupo Playcenter

"Noites do Terror" (Nights of Terror) was one of the major themed events in the Brazilian city of São Paulo, held at the now-defunct amusement park Playcenter starting in 1988.

== Origin ==
Its final edition took place in 2012. At the time it was discontinued, the event accounted for more than 30% of the park's total annual visits. The event featured various special guests, such as Zé do Caixão, who hosted the inaugural edition in 1988. For fifteen years, the event was helmed by Nilldo Jaffer.

In 2001, the park invested 3 million reais in the attraction, and in its most recent edition, that figure reached 4 million reais.

== Brand Issues ==
In 2023, the Tribunal de Justiça de São Paulo ordered Hopi Hari to pay R$ 1.5 million to the company Play One Empreendimentos for its use of the registered trademark "Noites do Terror."
