= Carlos Alberto Menezes Direito =

Brazilian judge

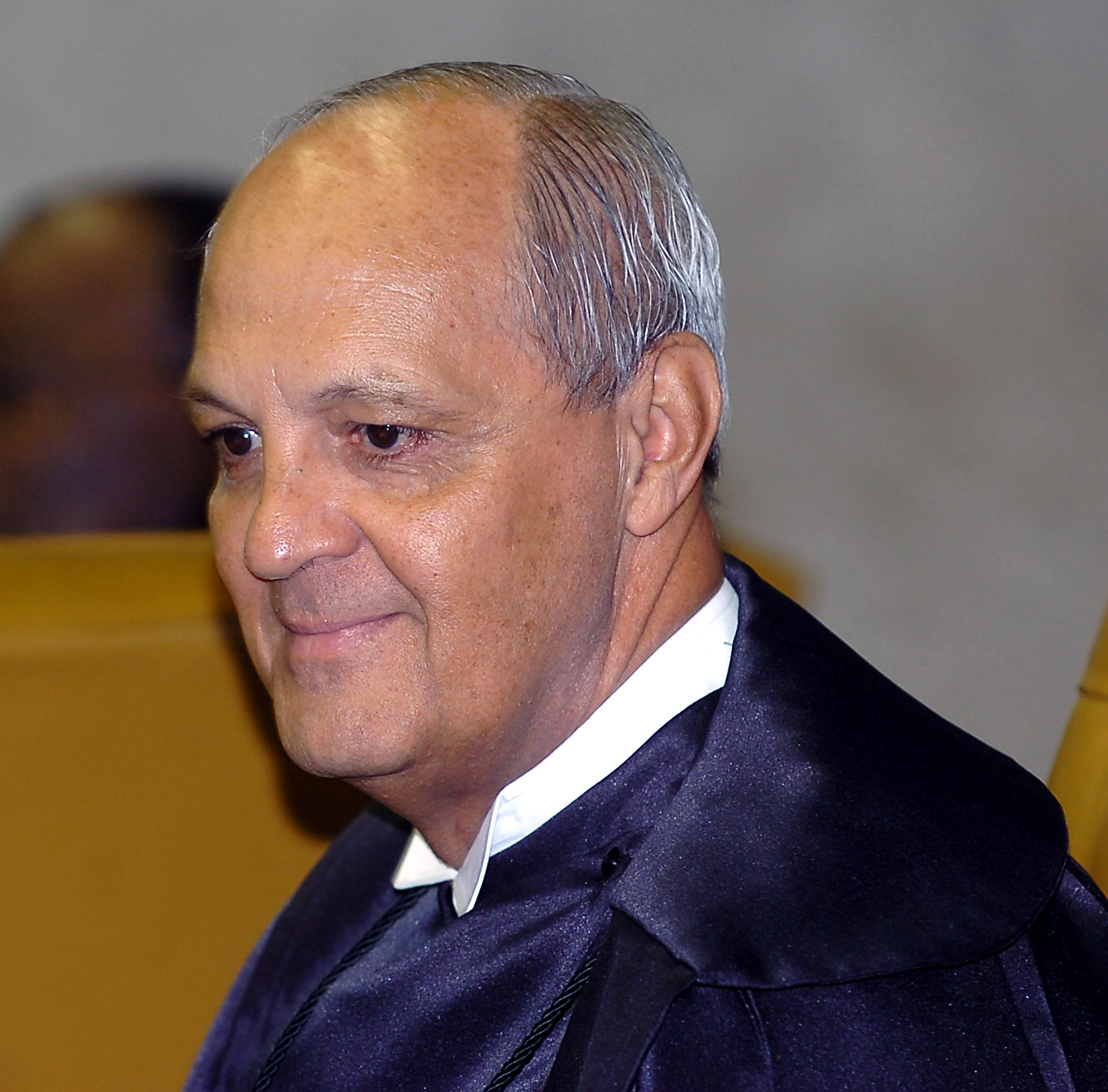
- Justice Carlos Alberto Menezes Direito in 2007

Supreme Federal Court Justice
- In office September 5, 2007 – September 1, 2009
- Appointed by: Luiz Inácio Lula da Silva
- Preceded by: Sepúlveda Pertence
- Succeeded by: Dias Toffoli

Personal details
- Born: September 8, 1942 Belém, Brazil
- Died: September 1, 2009 (aged 66) Rio de Janeiro, Brazil
- Spouse: Wanda Vianna Direito
- Children: Luciana Maria, Carlos Alberto and Carlos Gustavo

Carlos Alberto Menezes Direito (September 8, 1942 – September 1, 2009) was a Brazilian judge who sat on the Supreme Federal Court, the highest court of law in Brazil, from his appointment in 2007 until his death in 2009.

Direito received his law degree from the Pontifical Catholic University of Rio de Janeiro in 1965. He served as a judge on the Superior Court of Justice (STJ) until 2007.

Carlos Alberto Menezes Direito was nominated to the Supreme Federal Court, the highest court in Brazil, by President Luiz Inácio Lula da Silva in 2007. Direito replaced former Supreme Federal Court Justice Sepúlveda Pertence.

Direito was hospitalized in 2009 and underwent surgery to remove a tumor from his pancreas at Hospital Samaritano in Rio de Janeiro. The surgery was reported to be successful. However, he was re-admitted to the Hospital Samaritano's intensive-care unit on Saturday, August 29, 2009, and placed on a ventilator.

Judge Carlos Alberto Menezes Direito died of pancreatic cancer at the Hospital Samaritana in Rio de Janeiro on September 1, 2009, at the age of 66. His death created a vacancy on the Supreme Federal Court. The Brazilian flags around the country stayed at half mast for three days following his death.

Legal offices
| Preceded by Sepúlveda Pertence | Judge of the Supreme Federal Court of Brazil; 2007–2009 | Succeeded by Dias Toffoli |
