= Heleno Fragoso =

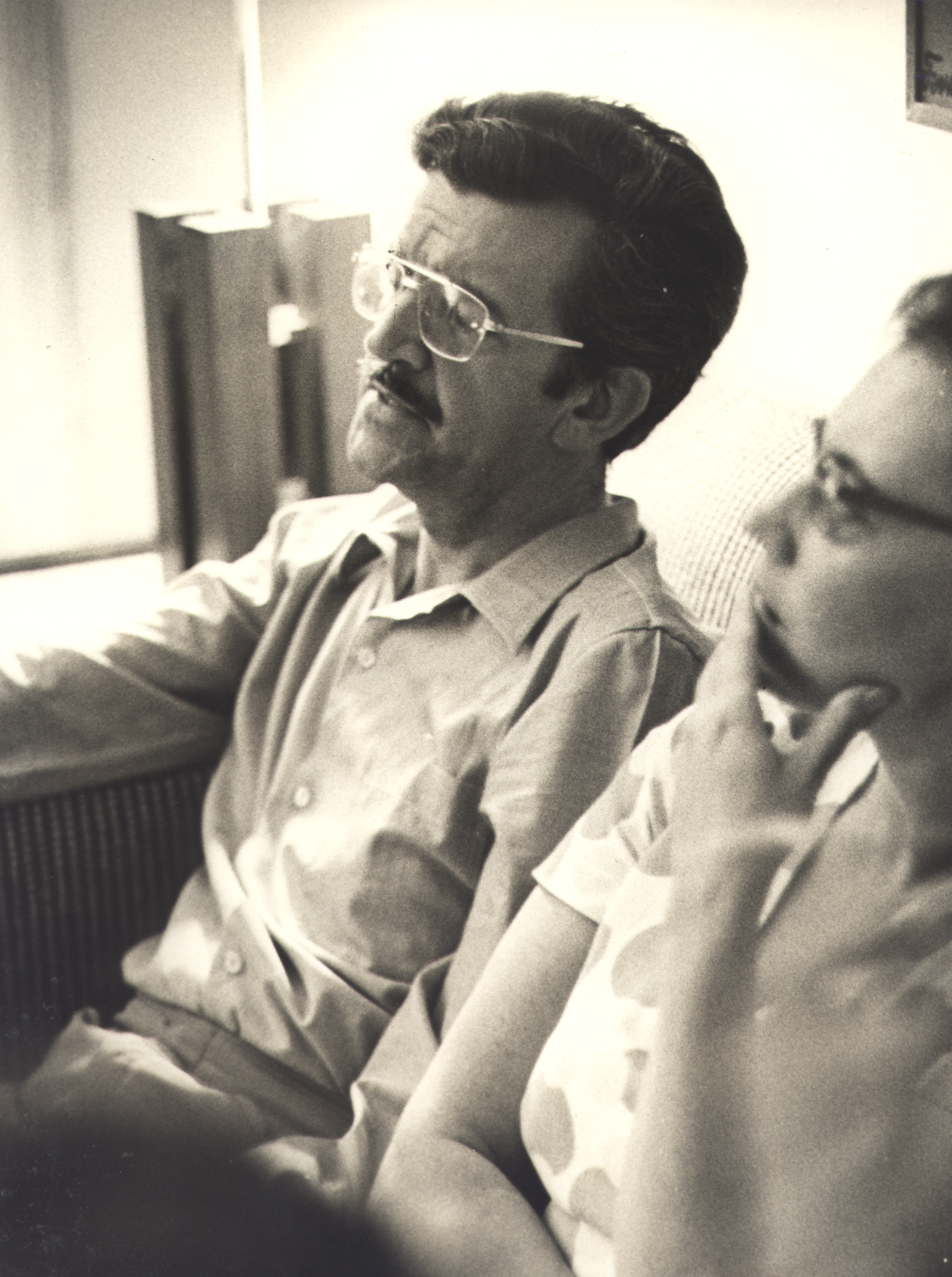
Heleno Fragoso (1970)

Heleno Cláudio Fragoso (February 5, 1926 – May 18, 1985) was a Brazilian professor of Criminal Law and Criminology.

== Biography ==
Heleno Cláudio Fragoso was born in Nova Iguaçú. He lectured at the University of the State of Rio de Janeiro. He served as the Vice President of the International Association of Penal Law and of the International Commission of Jurists. In 1966, he was a visiting instructor at the John Jay College of Criminal Justice (City University of New York).

He was a notable penal lawyer in Brazil, representing many political adversaries imprisoned or murdered during the Brazilian military dictatorship between 1964–1985, including Stuart Angel, Francisco José Pinto dos Santos, and Ênio Silveira, among others. Fragoso was an influential supporter of human rights at that period, denouncing torture applied by the political police even after having been arrested himself by the agents of the regime.

He wrote several books, articles and essays published in specialized reviews. He died in Rio de Janeiro.

== Bibliography (all in Portuguese) ==
- (1958) Criminal Law, Special Part, two volumes, last edition: 1988 (Lições de Direito Penal, Parte Especial, 2 volumes)
- (1961) Punishable Conduct (Conduta Punível)
- (1965) The penal justice and the Revolution (A justiça penal e a revolução)
- (1975) First lines in Criminal Law and Criminal Procedure (Primeiras Linhas sobre o Direito Penal e o Processo Penal)
- (1976) Criminal Law, General Principles, last edition: 2006 (Lições de Direito Penal, Parte Geral)
- (1976) The abuse of drugs in the Brazilian legislation (Abuso de Drogas na Legislação Brasileira)
- (1977) Criminal Law and Human Rights (Direito Penal e Direitos Humanos)
- (1978–81) Penal Code - Commentaries, actualization of the work of Nelson Hungria (Comentários ao Código Penal)
- (1980) Prisoner's Rights (Direitos dos Presos, with prof. Yolanda Catão).
- (1980) Homeland Security Law: an undemocratic experience (Lei de Segurança Nacional: uma experiência antidemocrática)
- (1981) Terrorism and Political Criminality (Terrorismo e Criminalidade Politica, 1981)
- (1982) Criminal Jurisprudence (Jurisprudência Criminal, 1982)
- (1984) Advocacy of Freedom (Advocacia da liberdade)
