= Victor Nunes Leal =

Brazilian politician (1914–1985)

- Leal in 1958

Justice of the Supreme Federal Court
- In office 7 December 1960 – 16 January 1969
- President: Juscelino Kubitschek
- Preceded by: Francisco de Paula Rocha Lagoa
- Succeeded by: Seat abolished

Chief of Staff to the Presidency
- In office 5 November 1956 – 10 August 1959
- President: Juscelino Kubitschek
- Preceded by: Álvaro Lins
- Succeeded by: [José Sette Câmara Filho

Personal details
- Born: 11 November 1914 Carangola, Minas Gerais, Brazil
- Died: 17 May 1985 (aged 70) Rio de Janeiro, Rio de Janeiro, Brazil
- Education: National Faculty of Law

Victor Nunes Leal (11 November 1914 – 17 May 1985) was a Brazilian jurist, Minister of the Supreme Federal Court and professor at the Federal University of Rio de Janeiro (UFRJ).

He graduated from the National Faculty of Law of the Federal University of Rio de Janeiro, then known as the University of Brazil, in 1936.

He helped draft the Brazilian Code of Civil Procedure (Portuguese:Código de Processo Civil) of 1939.

== Early life ==
Leal was born on 11 November 1914 in the Brazilian municipality of Carangola, Minas Gerais, to Nascimento Nunes Leal and Angelina de Oliveira Leal.

He completed his secondary education in Carangola and Juiz de Fora, after which he moved to Rio de Janeiro to attend the National Faculty of Law. While still a university student, he worked on the team which helped draft the 1939 Brazilian Code of Civil Procedure, was chief editor of Rádio Tupi and edited the newspapers Diário da Noite, Diário de Notícias and O Jornal.

== Family ==
No less important, regarding family and legacy, Victor, who is of Portuguese origin, had brothers such as Paulo Nunes Leal, who was an Army colonel, military engineer and important Brazilian politician, becoming a Federal Deputy and Governor of the state of Rondônia.

And his grandson André Costa Leal, businessman and multimillionaire, computer engineer in the market of software engineering, digital marketing, advertising and mainly in the financial market.

Political offices
Preceded by Álvaro Lins	Chief of Staff of the Presidency; 1956–59	Succeeded by José Sette Câmara Filho
Legal offices
Preceded by Francisco de Paula Rocha Lagoa	Justice of the Supreme Federal Court; 1960–69	Seat abolished by AI-5
