= Ellen Gracie Northfleet =

Brazilian judge

Her Excellency Ellen Gracie Northfleet
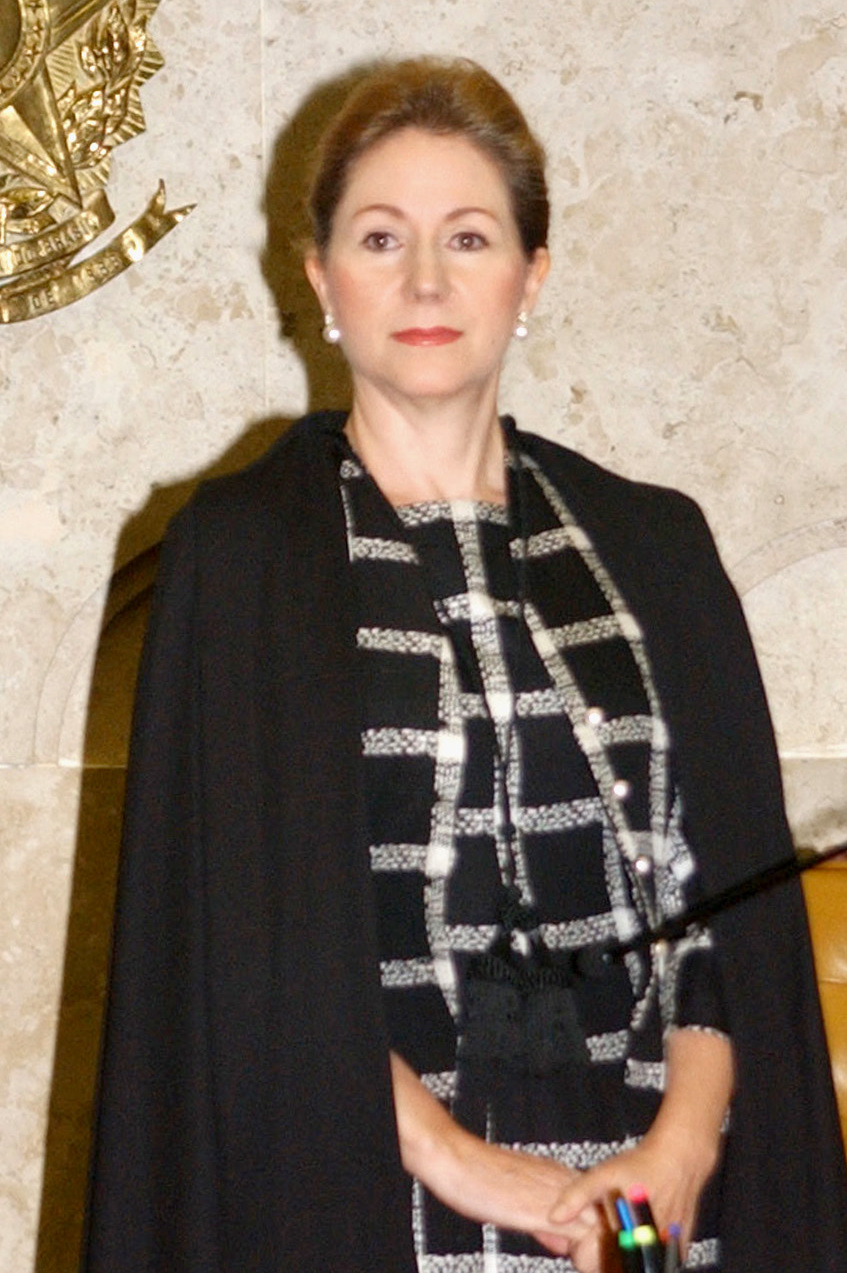

Justice of the Supreme Federal Court
- In office 14 December 2000 – 8 August 2011
- Appointed by: Fernando Henrique Cardoso
- Preceded by: Octavio Gallotti
- Succeeded by: Rosa Weber

52nd President of the Supreme Federal Court
- In office 30 March 2006 – 24 April 2008
- Vice President: Gilmar Mendes
- Preceded by: Nelson Jobim
- Succeeded by: Gilmar Mendes

Personal details
- Born: 16 February 1948 (age 78) Rio de Janeiro, Brazil
- Education: Federal University of Rio Grande do Sul
- Other judicial positions: 2008–2011: Substitute Justice, Superior Electoral Court; 2006–2008: President, National Justice Council; 2004–2006: Vice President, National Justice Council; 2004–2006: Vice President, Supreme Federal Court; 2003–2005: Vice President, Superior Electoral Court; 2001–2005: Effective Justice, Superior Electoral Court; 2000–2001: Substitute Justice, Superior Electoral Court

Ellen Gracie Northfleet (Portuguese: [ˈɛlẽj ˈɡɾejsi nɔʁtʃˈflitʃ]; born 16 February 1948) is a Brazilian judge. She is the first woman to be appointed to the Supreme Court of Brazil and the Court's first female president.

On 8 August 2011, she retired from the Court, 7 years before the full extension that would go until 70 years old.

== Education ==
She earned her LL.B from the Faculty of Law of the Federal University of Rio Grande do Sul in 1970, and later pursued a graduate degree in Social Anthropology at the same university. Northfleet was also a Fulbright Scholar and assisted in the development of the United States Law Library of Congress Global legal information network project.

Her public career began in 1971, clerking for the Rio Grande do Sul State General Counsel. On 7 November 1973, she joined the Ministério Público Federal, where she remained in the capacity of Federal Prosecutor until 1989, when she first joined the Judiciary, becoming a judge in the Regional Federal Court of the 4th Region, an appeal Court.

Northfleet was appointed to the Supreme Federal Court on 23 November 2000, by then president of Brazil Fernando Henrique Cardoso. She was the first woman to be named to the court. On 15 March 2006, after her appointment by the president, she was confirmed to head this court by a vote of its justices. She replaced Nelson Jobim, who retired on 30 March 2006, presumably to run for office. She was 58 years of age at the time she was appointed by Fernando Henrique Cardoso.

In May 2006, she came very close to becoming the first acting female president, when Luiz Inácio Lula da Silva was travelling abroad. According to Brazilian law, when the President is away from the country the next in succession becomes interim president. However, since elections were drawing near, anyone who occupied the post would be disqualified from running for office, so the vice-president, José Alencar, and the speaker of the house, Aldo Rebelo, the next in succession and who were considering running, also left Brazil. This would have made her the interim president for at least 10 hours. However, President of the Senate Renan Calheiros, who was not up for re-election and preceded her in the order of succession, stayed behind.

There was no formal announcement of her decision to retire and no formal ceremony at her departure.

After her departure the Brazilian Association of Federal Judges published a public statement requesting that a representative of the Federal Magistrature be appointed for her position. Ellen Gracie was not a career magistrate since she did not write the exams to become a Federal Judge, as is the case for members of the Federal Magistrature. She was nominated for the position by then Brazilian president Fernando Henrique Cardoso.

=== World Justice Project ===
Northfleet is on the board of directors of the World Justice Project. The World Justice Project works to lead a global, multidisciplinary effort to strengthen the Rule of Law for the development of communities of opportunity and equity. She is also a member of the Inter-American Dialogue.

Legal offices
Preceded by Octavio Gallotti	Justice of the Supreme Federal Court; 2000–2011	Succeeded by Rosa Weber
