= Francisco Rezek =

Brazilian judge (born 1944)

His Excellency Francisco Rezek
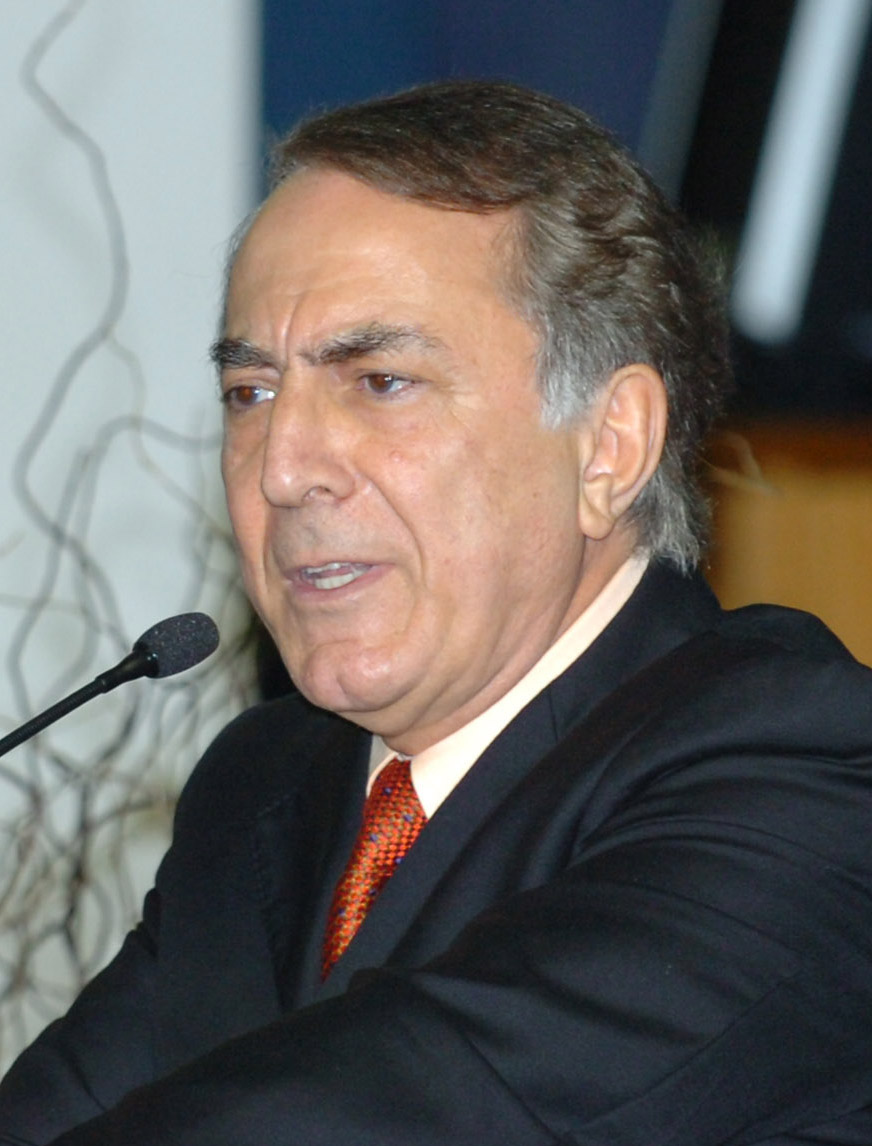

Judge of the International Court of Justice
- In office 6 February 1997 – 5 February 2006
- Preceded by: Mohamed Shahabuddeen
- Succeeded by: Bernardo Sepúlveda Amor

Justice of the Supreme Federal Court
- In office 21 May 1992 – 5 February 1997
- Nominated by: Fernando Collor de Mello
- Preceded by: Célio Borja
- Succeeded by: Nelson Jobim
- In office 24 March 1983 – 15 March 1990
- Nominated by: João Figueiredo
- Preceded by: Xavier de Albuquerque
- Succeeded by: Carlos Velloso

Minister of Foreign Affairs
- In office 15 March 1990 – 13 April 1992
- President: Fernando Collor de Mello
- Preceded by: Abreu Sodré
- Succeeded by: Celso Lafer

President of the Supreme Federal Court
- In office 4 April 1989 – 15 March 1990
- Vice President: Sydney Sanches
- Preceded by: Aldir Passarinho
- Succeeded by: Sydney Sanches

Personal details
- Born: January 18, 1944 (age 82) Cristina, Minas Gerais, Brazil
- Parents: Elias Rezek (father); Baget Baracat (mother)
- Education: Federal University of Minas Gerais; Paris-Sorbonne University; Wolfson College, Oxford

José Francisco Rezek (born January 18, 1944, in Cristina) is a Brazilian judge who served as a member of the International Court of Justice, based in The Hague, Netherlands, from 1996 to 2006. His surname "Rezek" comes from Lebanon.

He earned his LL.B and D.E.S degrees from the Federal University of Minas Gerais (Belo Horizonte) and practised as a lawyer for a few years. He then obtained his PhD degree from Paris-Sorbonne University in the 1970s. He followed his academic career on to England, earning a Diploma in Law at Oxford University in 1979 (Wolfson College), after undertaking extension courses and research at Harvard University (1965) and at The Hague Academy of International Law (1968).

He was a Professor of International Law and Constitutional Law at the University of Brasília from 1971 to 1997 and later became Chair of the Department of Law, serving from 1974 to 1976 and Dean of the Faculty of Social Studies from 1978 to 1979. He moved to Rio de Janeiro and held Professorships in International Law at Rio Branco Institute (the official diplomatic school of Brazil) from 1976 to 1997. Rezek was a Lecturer at The Hague Academy of International Law in 1986 and at the Institute of International Public Law and International Relations in Thessaloniki, Greece in 1989.

Rezek is also the president of several conferences, a lecturer and an examiner for professorship contests in the leading Brazilian universities (since 1971). He is currently professor of International Law Theory at University Center of Brasília (UniCEUB). He became Attorney of the Republic in 1972; and Deputy Attorney-General of the Republic from 1979 to 1983. He then became Justice of the Supreme Court of Brazil, appointed by the President with the approval of the Senate, in March, 1983, at the age of 39. He resigned in March 1990 and was appointed again in April, 1992, but retired in 1997.

He was Foreign Minister of Brazil from March 1990 to April 1992 and has been a Member of the Permanent Court of Arbitration since 1987.

Legal offices
Preceded by Xavier de Albuquerque	Justice of the Supreme Federal Court; 1983–1990	Succeeded by Carlos Velloso
Preceded by Célio Borja	Justice of the Supreme Federal Court; 1992–1997	Succeeded by Nelson Jobim
