= Federal University of Rio de Janeiro Faculty of Law =

Brazilian law school

University of Rio de Janeiro School of Law
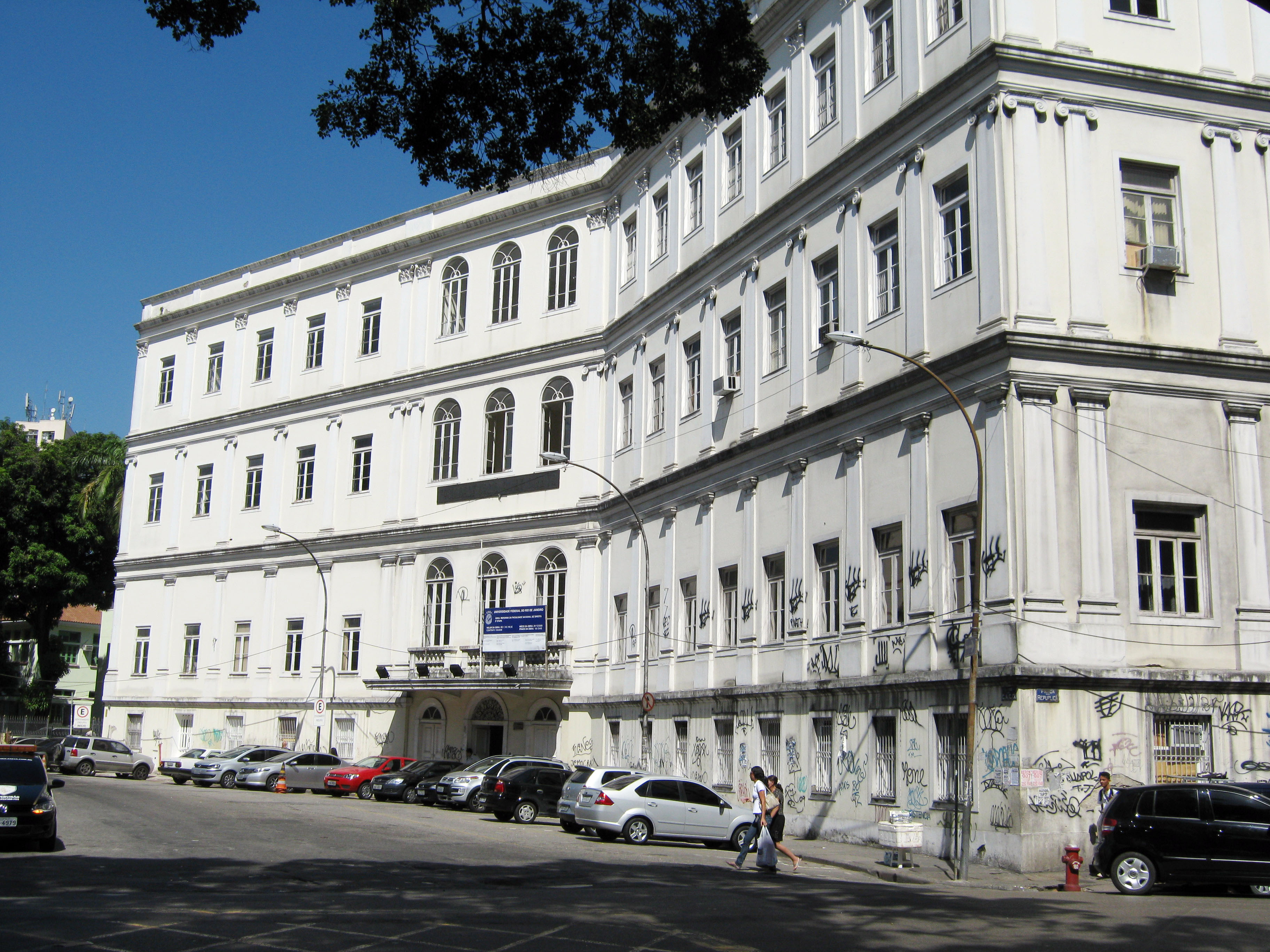
- Former name: National Faculty of Law
- Type: Law school
- Established: 1891; 135 years ago
- Parent institution: Federal University of Rio de Janeiro
- Dean: Carlos Alberto Pereira das Neves Bolonha
- Academic staff: 100-150
- Students: 3,018
- Undergraduates: 2,981
- Postgraduates: 57
- Location: Rio de Janeiro, Rio de Janeiro, Brazil; 22°54′26″S 43°11′26″W
- Website: www.direito.ufrj.br

The Federal University of Rio de Janeiro Faculty of Law (Portuguese: Faculdade de Direito da Universidade Federal do Rio de Janeiro (UFRJ)), also known as the National Faculty of Law (Portuguese: Faculdade Nacional de Direito), is a law school located in downtown Rio de Janeiro, Brazil.

Founded in 1920 through the merger of two private law schools dating from the 1880s, it is the third oldest law school in Brazil, after the University of São Paulo Faculty of Law and the Federal University of Pernambuco Faculty of Law, both founded in 1827. It is also the largest public law school in Brazil, with an enrollment of around three thousand students.

Its alumni include some of the most distinguished legal scholars and public officials of Brazil, and members of the Supreme Court like Lafayette de Andrada (1945–1969), Assunção Galotti (1949–1974), Nélson Hungria (1951–1961), Nunes Leal (1960–1969), Cordeiro Guerra (1974–1986), Moreira Alves (1975–2003), and Marco Aurélio Mello (1990–present).

The Faculty is located in the palace once dedicated to the Count of Arcos, in which the Brazilian Senate met from 1826 to 1924.

== History ==
The National Faculty of Law of UFRJ is the result of the merger in 1920 of two private schools, the Free Faculty of Law and Social Sciences of Rio de Janeiro and the Free School of Law. It was a long-held dream of prominent citizens such as Fernando Mendes de Almeida and others, who dreamed of creating a private law school. With the establishment of the republic and the creation of a free educational system, Mendes de Almeida called on former supporters of the idea and, with new members, worked for the establishment of Free School of Law and Social Sciences of Rio de Janeiro, which eventually became the National Faculty of Law.

The creation of the National Faculty of Law, through the merger of the two private colleges, represented an end to the monopoly of legal education, which until then was the nearly exclusive province of the Faculdade de Direito do Recife in Olinda, and the Faculdade de Direito da Universidade de São Paulo. The founding of the National Faculty of Law added much–needed diversity to the nation's legal education.

The National Faculty of Law, together with the UFRJ Polytechnical School and the UFRJ Medical School, became in 1945 the basis for a new university, the University of Brazil. During that period the faculty's library was created, the college's magazine "A Época" was launched, the Literary Guild and the Law Journal were created, under a committee formed by Cândido de Oliveira Filho, Luiz Carpenter Raul Pederneiras, Virgílio de Sá Pereira, Gilberto Amado and Afrânio Peixoto.

In the 1930s, the National Faculty of Law experienced memorable public contests for remarkable teachers, such as Joaquim Pimenta (sociology). The class of 1937 was especially noted for graduates such as José Honorio Rodrigues, and Evaristo de Moraes Filho, who became professor in labor law and sociology with his thesis on Auguste Comte.

In the 1940s the National Faculty of Law transferred to its current building, during a period marked by strong student mobilization (especially as resistance to the Estado Novo). Notable recruiting drives continued, bringing young lawyers to the Chairs of the Faculty, such as San Tiago Dantas and Hélio Tornaghi.

The 1950s consolidated the reputation of the National Faculty of Law. In 1955, the inaugural class of San Tiago Dantas, entitled "Legal Education and the Brazilian crisis", attracted much attention. At that time, San Tiago presented new guidelines for the legal education and criticized legal teaching methods of the time, defending the case system as opposed to the text system, and also argued that an interdisciplinary approach to Law was more suitable to modern times.

In 1960, the Brazilian capital moved to Brasília, and the process of federalisation of higher education began, with UFRJ as a part of it. With the coup of 1964, the National Faculty of Law faced some consequences, but the CACO – Centro Acadêmico Cândido de Oliveira (the faculty's students' union) fought against the military regime.

In the 1970s, the National Faculty of Law went through a deep crisis, characterized by the carrying out of only a few entrance examinations and a gradual reduction of faculty staff. The 1980s were also marked by crises and obstacles in entrance drives.

In the 1990s, there were some initiatives, such as curriculum changes, the rearrangement of departmental structure and the creation of a center for community outreach, including a Special Court, an office of the Ombudsman, and a center for legal practice.

Since the end of 2009, following the election of a new directing board, the National Faculty of Law has been going through deep changes in academic and structural matters, aimed at improving the school's quality and reputation.

== Notable alumni ==
=== Members of the Supreme Court ===
- Lafayette de Andrada (1945–1969)
- Luís d'Assunção Gallotti (1949–1974)
- Nélson Hungria (1951–1961)
- Victor Nunes Leal (1960–1969)
- João Baptista Cordeiro Guerra (1974–1986)
- José Carlos Moreira Alves (1975–2003)
- Ilmar Nascimento Galvão (1991–2003)
- Marco Aurélio Mello (1990–present)

=== Arts ===
- Jorge Amado, writer
- Clarice Lispector, writer
- Gustavo Barroso, writer, member of the Brazilian Academy of Letters
- Oscar Arararipe, writer and painter
- Rubem Fonseca, writer and screenwriter
- Ary Barroso, songwriter
- Geraldo Vandré, singer-songwriter
- Lamartine Babo, songwriter
- Alceu Amoroso Lima, writer, member of the Brazilian Academy of Letters
- Mário Reis, singer
- Humberto Teixeira, songwriter
- Marcos Barbosa, writer, member of the Brazilian Academy of Letters
- José Eduardo Pizarro Drummond, writer, member of the Brazilian Academy of Letters
- Ronald de Carvalho, poet

=== Scholars ===
- San Tiago Dantas, legal scholar
- Heleno Fragoso, criminal lawyer and legal scholar
- Sérgio Buarque de Holanda, historian, literary critic and journalist
- Pedro Calmon, chancellor of the University of Brazil, member of the Brazilian Academy of Letters
- Afonso Arinos de Melo Franco, legal scholar, historian, literary critic, member of the Brazilian Academy of Letters
- Francisco José de Oliveira Viana, legal scholar, historian, sociologist, member of the Brazilian Academy of Letters
- Levi Carneiro, legal scholar, writer, member of the Brazilian Academy of Letters
- Celso Furtado, economist, member of the Brazilian Academy of Letters

=== Politics and diplomacy ===
- Chagas Freitas, governor of the State of Guanabara (1971–1975) and the State of Rio de Janeiro (1979–1983)
- Carlos Lacerda, governor of the State of Guanabara (1960–1965)
- Osvaldo Aranha, diplomat, politician, governor of the State of Rio Grande do Sul (1930), ambassador to U.S. (1934)
- Ronaldo Sardenberg, diplomat, politician, ambassador to the United Nations (2003–2007), minister of Science and Technology (1999–2002)
- Arthur Virgílio, diplomat, politician, Senator for the State of Amazonas (2003–2011)
- Abraão Ribeiro, mayor of São Paulo (1945–1947)
- José Hosken de Novaes, governor of Paraná (1982–1983)
- Antônio Balbino, governor of Bahia (1955–1959)
- Petrônio Portella, governor of Piauí (1963–1966)
- Guilherme Palmeira, governor of Alagoas (1979–1982), mayor of Maceió (1989–1990)
- Pedro Calmon, Minister of Education (1950–1951) and (1959–1960), member of the Brazilian Academy of Letters
- Afonso Arinos de Melo Franco, Minister of External Relations, member of the Brazilian Academy of Letters
- Alberto Maria José de Orléans e Bragança, member of the Brazilian Imperial Family
- Roberto Mangabeira Unger, Minister of Strategic Affairs (2007-2015)
- Alberto Ninio, General Council of the Asian Infrastructure Investment Bank

=== Sports ===
- Heleno de Freitas, football player
- João Saldanha, football player and coach
