= Civil procedure in Brazil =

Civil procedure in Brazil consists of the rules of civil procedure detailed in the Civil Procedure Code (Portuguese: Código de Processo Civil, commonly referred to as CPC), which has been approved in March, 2015, and being in application since March, 2016, in substitution to the old code from 1973. As a civil law system, it is heavily influenced by Roman and German concepts of civil procedure. In Brazil, civil procedure regulates the hearings of conflicts based in various sectors of law, such as private law, social law, and public law.

== History ==
=== The Philippine Ordinances ===
The early origins of Brazilian civil procedure can be found in the Portuguese Philippine Ordinances (Ordenações Filipinas), which were prepared during the reign of Philip I of Portugal in 1595, but not promulgated until the reign of Philip II in 1603. These ordinances were applied to Colonial Brazil and continued to be in force in the country after its independence from Portugal in 1822. Book III of the Ordinances contained basic rules for bringing an issue before a court, such as requiring the complaint to be written and authorizing "secret acts" where both the plaintiff and defendant were barred from participating (parties did not participate in the examination of witnesses, for example). These procedures were heavily influenced by Roman and canon law, signaling Brazil´s long-standing preference for civil law systems. The Philippine Ordinances remained valid in Brazil for centuries, and even with the publishing of the 1850 Commercial Code, civil cases continued to follow the rules of procedure delineated by the ordinances. With the 1891 Constitution, states were authorized to create their own rules for civil procedure. Most continued to embrace the Roman influences of the previous system. Most states also failed to properly revitalize and modernize the process. This failure influenced the 1934 Constitution to grant authority over the civil procedure to the Brazilian Federal Government.

=== The 1939 Civil Procedure Code ===
The 1939 Code of Civil Procedure (Portuguese:Código de Processo Civil) was a direct result of the 1934 Constitution. The 1939 code was viewed as an improvement, as it introduced oral proceedings, concentrated proceedings, and authorized the judge to play a greater role. However, Brazilian legal scholar Sérgio Bermudes observed that the code represented the uncomfortable coexistence of two different influences: "a generalized modern element, heavily inspired by German, Austrian and Portuguese law, as well as the work of legislative review of Italy; and a specialized anachronistic element, sometimes too faithful to the old Lusitanian process, sometimes completely unsystematic."

=== The 1973 Civil Procedure Code ===
After a decade of observation and debate, the Federal Government authorized a major reform to the 1939 Code of Civil Procedure that ran from 1969 until 1972. The new code was drafted by law scholar Alfredo Buzaid, who would later serve as a judge on the Brazilian Federal Supreme Court, and was reviewed by a commission consisting of judges José Frederico Marques, Luiz Machado Guimarães, and Luíz Antônio de Andrade. The new Código de Processo Civil (CPC), which became law in 1973, aimed to hasten the litigation process, move away from an over-reliance on written documents and pleadings, and broaden the powers of the judge. After 37 years and 65 amendments since its ratification, it was entirely substituted for a new code in 2015.

== Types of processes ==
The 1973 CPC recognizes three different types of processes: cognitive (cognição), executory (execução), and provisional (cautelar). The attention given to the latter two is relatively minor, as executory processes merely deal with the enforcement of a right or entitlement previously (and specifically) declared by law, and provisional processes are a procedural function provided by the CPC to maintain equilibrium between the plaintiff and defendant during litigation. Thus, the majority of the CPC focuses on cognitive processes. These processes deal with contested claims where there is a need to define the concrete will of the law. Accordingly, cognition processes should culminate in a sentence based upon the merits of the case, and provide a definitive answer to the initial complaint filed by the plaintiff.

Among cognitive processes, the CPC makes a further distinction between those of special procedure (procedimento especial) and common procedure (procedimento comum). Special procedure is reserved by certain issues or disputes by Book IV of the CPC and other statutes, notably the special courts (juizados especiais) found in law no. 9,099. These special procedures tend to focus on issues of minor complexity, and can be properly characterized as “highly summarized proceedings.”

Additionally, common cognitive procedures themselves can be broken into two categories: those that receive the full, traditional treatment from the legal system (procedimento comum ordinário) and those that receive summary proceedings (procedimento sumário). Summary proceedings are entirely abridged from beginning to end (as opposed to a conclusion reached early in the process of traditional procedure, as with summary judgment). Summary proceedings in Brazilian law are triggered primarily by factors that deal with the inherent subject matter of their corresponding litigation, such as low-cost disputes or minor damages from automobile accidents.

Thus, a fully litigated, non-summarized case will receive common ordinary procedure (procedimento comum ordinário).

== Stages of process ==
The common ordinary procedure is often broken down into four phases: a pleading stage (fase postulatória), a conclusive opening order (despacho saneador), an evidentiary stage (fase probatória), and a decision-making stage.

=== Pleading stage ===
A plaintiff begins the civil process by submitting a complaint, referred to as an initial petition (petição initial). The initial petition must include the name of the judge or court to which it is addressed, as well the names and additional identifiers of the plaintiff and defendant. Traditionally, it then is separated into three parts: statement of facts (a recital of the events that occurred that provoked the petition), considerations of law (a collection of statutes and legal authorities supporting the position of the plaintiff), and a request for relief (where the desired legal action to be taken by the court is specified by the plaintiff). The initial petition must also include a specification of what evidence the plaintiff intends to prove his allegations, and all documents supporting the alleged facts. The petition is then given to the judge, who may either reject it (the rejection can be appealed, however), request modifications, or accept is as it is. Upon acceptance, the defendant usually has 15 days to offer his answer, under penalty of default.

The defendant can answer the initial petition with one of three different responses: a tradition answer (contestação), a counterclaim (recovenção) or an exception (exceção). The contestação acts as an inverse of the initial petition: it includes the defendant´s own factual allegations and legal citations that contend against the plaintiff's charges, as well as supporting documentation and evidence. A failure to allege certain arguments results in a forfeiture of those positions. A counterclaim, where the defendant asserts his own complaint against the defendant, must be based upon the controversy in question or arise from a defense to the complaint. An exception is an assertion that attempts to end the litigation before it arrives to a judgment upon the merits (such as lack of jurisdiction).

=== Conclusive opening order ===
After the judge has reviewed the initial petition and the answer, the judge and parties meet to reduce the focus of the litigation to the issues in contention. If the review produces the realization that there are no disputed facts and that the issue of contention is a matter of law, he may offer summary judgment before the trial. If not, the conclusive opening order verifies that the issue of contention is deserving of an answer based upon the merits of the case, and defines what issues will be brought before the court.

=== Evidentiary stage ===
During the evidentiary stage, the judge is presented with the evidence that will inform his final decision. Evidence is gathered over a prolonged period of time, often enduring several months. Oral testimonies of parties other than the plaintiff and defendant are heard outside of court, with the judge acting as the examiner. The judge receives, prior to the questioning period, a series of questions from both sides of the litigation, and asks the questions in their stead. Upon conclusion of the testimony, the opposing side may submit a series of "cross-examination" questions in order to clarify elements of the witness's testimony. Expert witnesses are also permitted, although the judge generally consults an additional expert witness of his choosing. Requests for documents and other evidence to be produced by the opposing party may be submitted to the court; however, these requests must be fairly specific in what they wish to produce.

=== Decision-making phase ===
Upon conclusion of the evidentiary stage, the court is brought to trial (audiência). The initial purpose of the trial is to make one final attempt to resolve the case between the parties. Should the two parties fail to reach an agreement, the trial proceeds until the judge enters a decision based upon the merits. While the judge is permitted to evaluate evidence freely, he is required to decide in accordance with the common rules of experience, written law of the land and knowledge of former decisions (a tendency that is approaching Brazilian civil procedure law to English Common Law) and must express his conclusion in a formal sentence, where the decision is expressed and then published in government kept diaries (diários oficiais), similar to newspapers. A judgment supposedly is offered within 10 days after the final hearing, but often it takes a longer lapse of time to reach a final decision, due to the large number of civil actions at trial in Brazil.

== See also ==
- Law of Brazil
- Civil procedure
- Law of Portugal
