= Sepúlveda Pertence =

Brazilian jurist and lawyer (1937–2023)

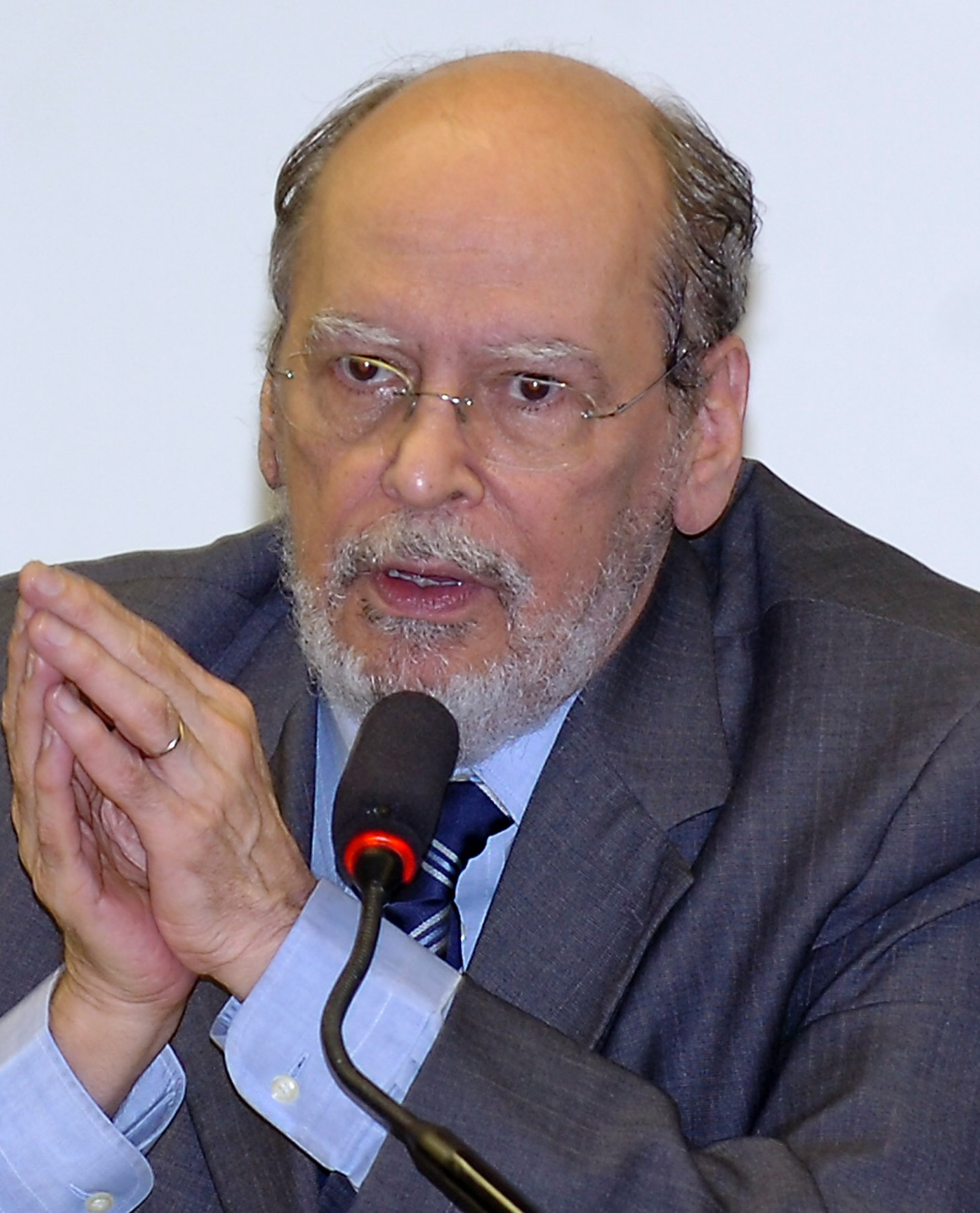
- Pertence in 2008

President of the Superior Electoral Court
- In office 20 November 2003 – 21 February 2005
- Preceded by: Nelson Jobim
- Succeeded by: Carlos Velloso
- In office 15 June 1993 – 22 November 1994
- Preceded by: Paulo Brossard
- Succeeded by: Carlos Velloso

Prosecutor General of the Republic of Brazil
- In office 15 March 1985 – 17 May 1989
- Preceded by: Inocêncio Mártires Coelho
- Succeeded by: Aristides Junqueira

Personal details
- Born: José Paulo Sepúlveda Pertence; 21 November 1937 Sabará, Minas Gerais, Brazil
- Died: 2 July 2023 (aged 85) Brasília, Brazil
- Education: Federal University of Minas Gerais
- Occupation: Jurist; Politician

José Paulo Sepúlveda Pertence (Sabará, November 21, 1937 – Brasília, July 2, 2023) was a Brazilian jurist, professor, lawyer, and judge. He held numerous positions, including Prosecutor General of the Republic, minister and president of the Federal Supreme Court (STF), and president of the Public Ethics Commission of the Presidency of the Republic.

== Education and career ==
Pertence graduated in law from the Federal University of Minas Gerais in 1960. During his secondary education, he was actively involved in the student movement, holding various representation and leadership roles in several organizations. He served as the 1st Vice-President of the National Union of Students (UNE) for the 1959/1960 term.

Pertence moved to Brasília in 1961, where he became a legal assistant for the Federal District city hall. He began a master’s program at the University of Brasília, where he was also an instructor and assistant professor from April 1962 until his dismissal in October 1965.

In 1963, Pertence passed a public exam to become a prosecutor for the Federal District and Territories. Between 1965 and 1967, he served as an advisor to Minister Evandro Lins e Silva at the STF. He was dismissed from the Public Ministry in October 1969 by the 1969 Military Junta under the AI-5 decree.

Subsequently, Pertence focused entirely on practicing law, partnering with former STF Minister Victor Nunes Leal, who had also been dismissed by the military government. Pertence practiced in Brasília, Minas Gerais, São Paulo, and Rio de Janeiro, and held various positions within the Brazilian Bar Association (OAB).

Chosen by Tancredo Neves for the role of Attorney General, Pertence was appointed by President José Sarney and took office on March 15, 1985. He simultaneously served as the Electoral Attorney General and a member of the Human Rights Defense Council. His tenure as Attorney General was marked by controversy, particularly regarding Representação 1349, where he opposed the constitutionality of the Informatics Law, leading to accusations of disloyalty and legal innovation.

Pertence was a member of the Affonso Arinos Commission, responsible for drafting the preliminary proposal for the 1988 Brazilian Constitution. His suggestion to grant autonomy to the Public Ministry was a decision he later regretted.

=== Federal Supreme Court ===
In 1989, President José Sarney appointed Pertence to the STF, filling the vacancy left by Minister Oscar Dias Correia. He assumed office on May 17.

Pertence was appointed by the STF to the Superior Electoral Court (TSE) from 1990 to 1992 and served as its president from June 15, 1993, to November 15, 1994. He returned as a minister and president of the TSE from 1999 to 2004.

On November 9, 1994, Pertence was elected vice-president of the STF and became president on April 19, 1995. He served as president until May 20, 1997. During his presidency, Pertence delivered numerous lectures on judicial reform, particularly advocating for the “binding summary” proposal, and addressed the challenges of the concentrated and diffuse systems of constitutional control in Brazil. He retired from the STF on August 17, 2007.

On December 7, 2009, Pertence was awarded the Grand Cross of the Order of Ipiranga by the São Paulo State Government, represented by then-Governor José Serra.

=== Public Ethics Commission of the Presidency ===
After his departure from the STF, Pertence became a member of the Public Ethics Commission of the Presidency of the Republic in December 2007. On September 24, 2012, while serving as the commission's president, he resigned after President Dilma Rousseff deviated from established practice by not renewing the terms of two councilors.

=== Defense of Luiz Inácio Lula da Silva ===
In February 2018, Pertence joined the defense team for former President Luiz Inácio Lula da Silva, who was convicted by the Regional Federal Court of the 4th Region for passive corruption and money laundering. Pertence believed that Lula was the target of unprecedented persecution.

== Death ==
Pertence died in the early hours of July 2, 2023, at the age of 85, at the Sírio-Libanês Hospital in Brasília due to multiple organ failure, after a week of hospitalization.

== Legal works ==
- “Da Competência na Teoria do Ordenamento Jurídico,” mimeo, UNE, 1965
- “Contribuição à Teoria do Distrito Federal,” Rev. do TJDF, nº 2/17; Rev. Forense
- “Liberdade de Direito e Asilo” (Proceedings of the VIII National OAB Conference)
- “A OAB e a Anistia” (OAB Opinion, 1979, in Anistia, Federal Senate, 1980, 2nd vol.)
- “Victor Nunes Leal” - Posthumous tribute at the STF — Public Law Review
- “A Crise Institucional Brasileira” (panel with Professors J. J. Calmon de Passos and Celso Antônio Bandeira de Mello, OAB-RJ, 1984)
- “Princípio da maioria absoluta” (Art. 75, CF) “Eleições de Governadores e Prefeitos” (opinion, Constitutional and Electoral Law Notebooks, v. 1/115)
- “Inelegibilidade — Crime contra a Administração Pública — Prescrição retroativa” (Constitutional and Electoral Law Notebooks, v. 1/115)
- “Propaganda Eleitoral — Isonomia” (opinion, Constitutional and Electoral Law Notebooks, v. 3/48)
- “Eleitoral — Possibilidade de os meios de comunicação divulgarem, a qualquer tempo, pesquisas eleitorais. Constituição de 1988” — Opinion, October 26, 1988
- Opinions of the Attorney General of the Republic (1985/1987), Ministry of Justice — DIN, Brasília, 1988, 601 pages

== Notes ==
- https://veja.abril.com.br/politica/regime-militar-fez-75-relatorios-de-inteligencia-sobre-sepulveda-pertence
- Fernando de Castro Fontainha, Angela Moreira Domingues da Silva, Izabel Saenger Nuñez (orgs.) História oral do Supremo (1988-2013), v.3: Sepúlveda Pertence, / Escola de Direito do Rio de Janeiro da Fundação Getulio Vargas. - Rio de Janeiro : Escola de Direito do Rio de Janeiro da Fundação Getulio Vargas, 2015
- In the Supreme Federal Court of Brazil, the presidency and vice-presidency are held for a two-year term by the Court's members, who are elected to these roles based on their longevity at the Court.
