= Dias Toffoli =

Brazilian lawyer

His Excellency Dias Toffoli
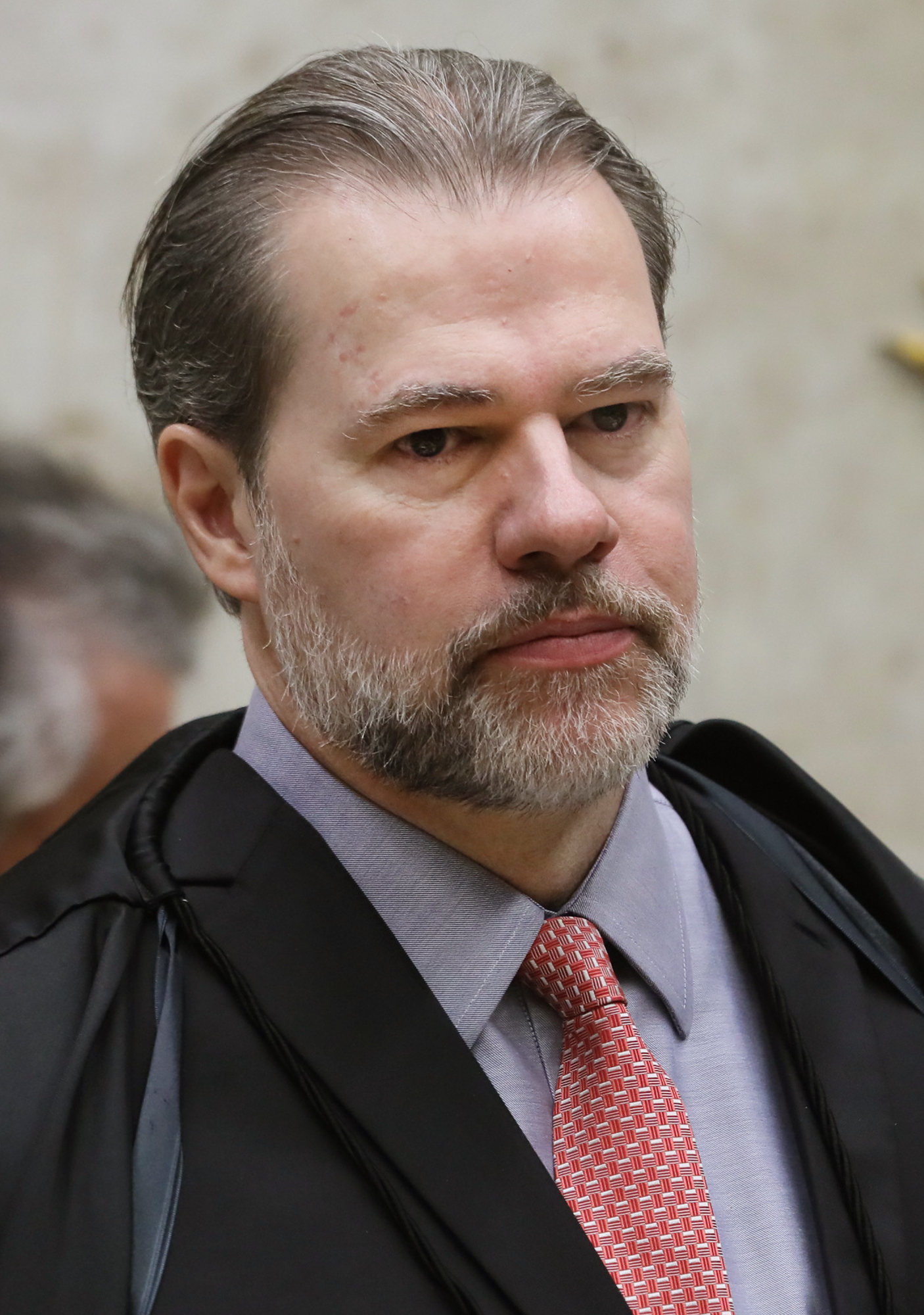

59th President of the Supreme Federal Court
- In office 13 September 2018 – 10 September 2020
- Vice President: Luiz Fux
- Preceded by: Cármen Lúcia
- Succeeded by: Luiz Fux

Justice of the Supreme Federal Court
- Incumbent
- Assumed office 23 October 2009
- Appointed by: Luiz Inácio Lula da Silva
- Preceded by: Menezes Direito

Attorney General of the Union
- In office 12 March 2007 – 23 October 2009
- President: Luiz Inácio Lula da Silva
- Preceded by: Álvaro Augusto Ribeiro Costa
- Succeeded by: Luís Inácio Adams

Personal details
- Born: José Antonio Dias Toffoli; 15 November 1967 (age 58) Marília, São Paulo, Brazil
- Education: Law School, University of São Paulo (LL.B.)
- Other judicial positions: 2018–2020: President, National Justice Council; 2016–2018: Vice President, Supreme Federal Court; 2014–2016: President, Superior Electoral Court; 2013–2014: Vice President, Superior Electoral Court; 2012–2016: Justice, Superior Electoral Court; 2009–2012: Substitute Justice, Superior Electoral Court

José Antonio Dias Toffoli (born November 15, 1967) is a Brazilian lawyer who has been a member of the Supreme Federal Court of Brazil since 2009, nominated by President Luiz Inácio Lula da Silva. Toffoli was the president of the Supreme Federal Court for the 2018–20 term.

== Biography ==
José Dias Toffoli was born in Marília, São Paulo, in 1967, the son of Luiz Toffoli and Sebastiana Seixas Dias Toffoli. He completed his secondary education at the Colégio Pedro II before enrolling at the University of São Paulo law school, graduating with a bachelor's degree in 1990. While in college, Toffoli presided over the student union. From 1996 to 2002, he was a constitutional and family law professor at Centro Universitário de Brasília.

In 1994 and 1995, Toffoli took examinations for a position as a judge in the state of São Paulo, but was twice rejected. Toffoli was then the legal representative for the Workers' Party (PT) in the presidential campaigns of Luiz Inácio Lula da Silva in 1998, 2002 and 2006.

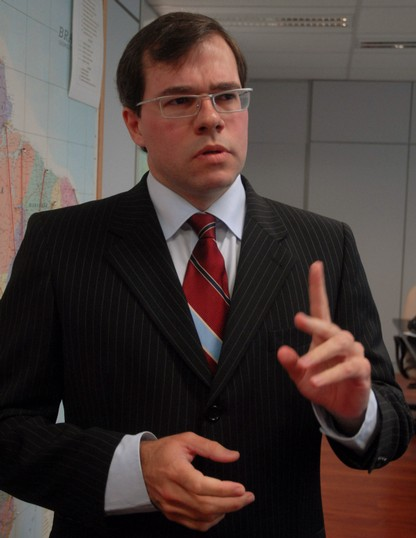
Toffoli in 2008, during his term as Attorney General of Brazil

From March 2001 to December 2002, Toffoli was a co-owner of the law firm Toffoli & Telesca Advogados, and from 2005 to 2007 co-owned the firm Toffoli & Rangel Advogados. In 2007, President Lula appointed Toffoli as Attorney General of Brazil.

=== Supreme Court nomination ===
On 17 September 2009, President Lula nominated Dias Toffoli, then his Attorney General of Brazil, for the Supreme Federal Court seat vacated by the death of Justice Carlos Alberto Menezes Direito two weeks prior. Upon his nomination, Toffoli resigned as Attorney General and was replaced by Evandro Costa Gama.

After being confirmed by the Senate to the Supreme Court, Toffoli took his seat as Justice on 23 October 2009, aged 41. At the time, he was the youngest to become a Supreme Court justice since 1988, and remains one of the youngest to enter the court. He was the eighth Supreme Court nominee by President Lula.

=== Presidency of the Supreme Federal Court ===
On 13 September 2018, Toffoli succeeded Justice Carmen Lúcia as the president of the Supreme Federal Court. The court's vice president for this term is Luiz Fux.

=== Odebrecht report ===
In April 2019, the Crusoé magazine reported that a document from Operation Car Wash reveals that then-Solicitor General Toffoli was involved in the Odebrecht scandal, according to the company's former chairman Marcelo Odebrecht. On 15 April, STF justice Alexandre de Moraes ordered that Crusoé take down the article from their website. Toffoli himself later requested a probe into whether Crusoé illegally leaked the document. The Court's decision on the matter was criticized by outlets such as The Intercept based on censorship and an attack on the freedom of the press.

Political offices
Preceded by Álvaro Augusto Ribeiro Costa	Attorney General of the Union; 2007–2009	Succeeded by Luís Inácio Adams
Legal offices
Preceded by Carlos Alberto Menezes Direito	Justice of the Supreme Federal Court; 2009–present	Incumbent
Preceded by Cármen Lúcia	President of the Supreme Federal Court; 2018–2020	Succeeded by Luiz Fux
Preceded by Cármen Lúcia	Vice President of the Supreme Federal Court; 2016–2018	Succeeded by Luiz Fux
Preceded by Marco Aurélio Mello	President of the Superior Electoral Court; 2014–2016	Succeeded by Gilmar Mendes
