= Pedro Soares Muñoz =

Brazilian politician, jurist, lawyer and magistrate

Pedro Soares Muñoz (Rio de Janeiro, March 31, 1916 – Porto Alegre, October 26, 1991) was a Brazilian politician, jurist, lawyer and magistrate. He was a Supreme Federal Court and Superior Electoral Court minister and desembargador, a law judge, an electoral judge, and a professor at Pontifical Catholic University of Rio Grande do Sul and at the Course for Preparation for Entry to the Public Ministry.
