= Nelson Hungria =

20th century Brazilian lawyer and magistrate

- Nelson Hungria Hoffbauer
- Born: 16 May 1891; Além Paraíba, Minas Gerais, Brazil
- Died: 26 March 1969 (aged 77); Rio de Janeiro, Rio de Janeiro, Brazil
- Education: Federal University of Rio de Janeiro
- Occupations: Lawyer, writer, and magistrate
- Known for: Member of authors' board of 1940 Brazilian Penal Code and the 1941 Brazilian Criminal Procedure Code.
- Notable work: Comentários ao Código Penal

Nelson Hungria Hoffbauer (Além Paraíba, May 16, 1891 – March 26, 1969) was a Brazilian professor of Criminal Law and Criminology. He published important books in Portuguese language about Brazilian Criminal Law, and he lectured Criminal Law at the Federal University of Rio de Janeiro.

Nelson Hungria was justice of Brazilian Supremo Tribunal Federal between 1951 and 1961.

Hungria was part of authors' board of the Penal Code of Brazil of 1940 and the Brazilian Criminal Procedure Code of 1941.

He wrote several books, articles and essays published in specialized reviews. He died in Rio de Janeiro.

== Bibliography (Original Title in Italic) ==
- (1932) Criminal Fraud (Fraude penal)
- (1933) About the Crimes Against the Popular Economy and Hire-Purchase With Domain Reservation (Dos crimes contra a economia popular e das vendas a prestações com reserva de dominio)
- (1936) The Putative Self-defense (A legitima defesa putativa)
- (1940) Criminal Legal Questions (Questões Jurídico-Penais)
- (1945) New Criminal Legal Questions (Novas Questões Jurídico-Penais)
- (1947-1958) Commentaries on Penal Code, nine volumes (Comentários ao Código Penal, 9 volumes)
- (1962) Studies about Criminal Procedure and Law (Estudos de Direito e Processo Penal)

Legal offices
Preceded by Aníbal Freire	Justice of the Supreme Federal Court; 1951–61	Succeeded by Pedro Chaves
