= Court of Justice of São Paulo =

- Tribunal de Justiça de São Paulo
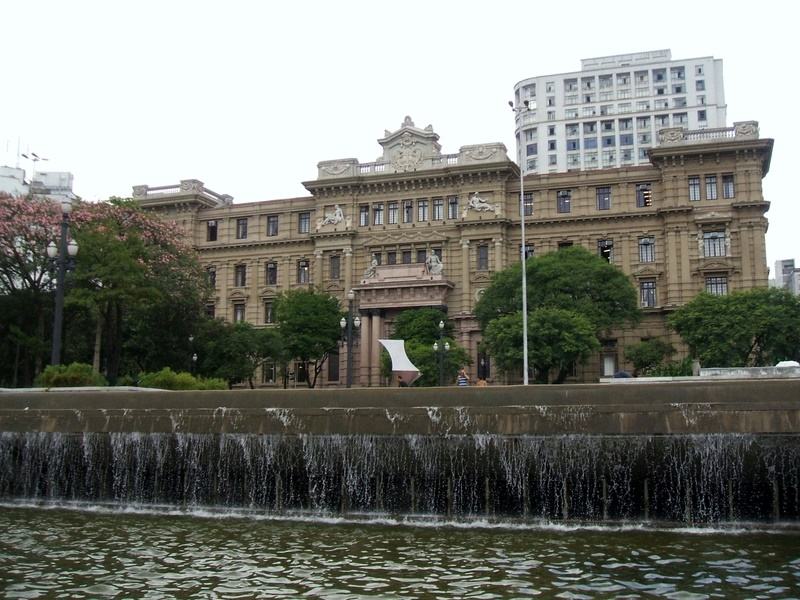
- Established: 3 February 1874; 152 years ago
- Jurisdiction: São Paulo
- Authorised by: 1989 State Constitution of São Paulo
- Appeals to: Superior Court of Justice
- Website: www.tjsp.jus.br

President
- Currently: Francisco Loureiro
- Since: 7 January 2026

The Court of Justice of São Paulo (Portuguese: Tribunal de Justiça de São Paulo (TJSP)) is the judicial branch of the Government of São Paulo. Its head office is in the capital and it has jurisdiction across the state.

It is constituted of 56 Judiciary Districts and has 360 desembargadores, considered the largest court in the world. It includes substitute judges of second degree and summoned judges, 729 in total. In January 2009, the number of cases in progress reached 18.21 million. In early 2025, the court reported about 18 million cases in progress, with more than 5 million new cases filed in 2024.

The president elect for the 2026/2027 biennium is desembargador Francisco Loureiro.

== Assignments ==
The TJSP is the head of the Judiciary. It considers the final appeals of sentences given in the state districts. Its assignments are defined by the Article 74 of the São Paulo State Constitution.

- Prosecute and judge originally:
1. in common criminal offenses: the Vice Governor, the State Secretaries, the State Deputies, the Prosecutor-General of Justice, the Attorney-General of the State, the Public Defender-General and the Mayors.
2. in common criminal offenses and responsibility crimes: the judges of the Military Justice Court, the Judges of Law and Judges of Military Law (first instance), the members of the Public Prosecutor's Office (except the Prosecutor-General of Justice), the Delegate-General of the Civil Police and the Commanders of the Military Police of the State of São Paulo and of the Military Firefighters Corps of the State of São Paulo.
3. the writs of security and the habeas data against the Governor's acts, of the Board and Presidency of the Legislative Assembly, the Court itself or any of its members, the Presidents of the State and City Court of Accounts, the Prosecutor-General of Justice, the Mayor and the President of the Municipal Chamber of São Paulo.
4. the habeas corpus in the cases which appeals are from within its competence or when the coercion or patient is an authority directly subject to its jurisdiction, except for the jurisdiction of the Military Justice Court, in cases which appeals are from its jurisdiction.
5. the writs of injunction, when the inexistence of a state of municipal regulatory rule, from any of the Powers, include from indirect administration, becomes impossible the exercise of rights secured in this Constitution.
6. the representation of unconstitutionality of the law or state or municipal normative act, contested before the State Constitution, the request of intervention in the cities and acts of unconstitutionality by omissão, in view of the precept in the State Constitution.
7. the rescission acts of its judged and criminal appeals of cases in its jurisdiction.
8. the attribution conflicts between the administrative and judiciary authorities of the state.
9. the complaint for the guarantee of authority of its decision.
10. the representation of unconstitutionality of law or municipal normative act, contested before the Federal Constitution.
- Invoke the intervention of the Union in the state to guarantee the free exercise of the Judiciary, in the terms of the State and Federal Constitutions.
- Request the intervention of the state in a city, according to terms provided by law.

== Directors ==
- Francisco Eduardo Loureiro - President
- Luís Francisco Aguilar Cortez - Vice-President
- Silvia Rocha - Inspector-General
- Roberto Nussinkis Mac Cracken - President of the Private Law Section
- Luciana Almeida Prado Bresciani - President of Public Law Section
- Roberto Caruso Costabile e Solimene - President of Criminal Law Section
- José Carlos Gonçalves Xavier de Aquino - Dean

== See also ==
- Court of Justice
- Superior Court of Justice
- Supreme Federal Court
- Palace of Justice of São Paulo
