= Nelson Jobim =

Brazilian jurist, politician and businessman

His Excellency Nelson Jobim
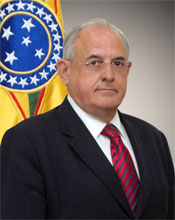

Minister of Defence
- In office 25 July 2007 – 4 August 2011
- President: Luiz Inácio Lula da Silva; Dilma Rousseff
- Preceded by: Waldir Pires
- Succeeded by: Celso Amorim

Justice of the Supreme Federal Court
- In office 15 April 1997 – 29 March 2006
- Appointed by: Fernando Henrique Cardoso
- Preceded by: Francisco Rezek
- Succeeded by: Cármen Lúcia

51st President of the Supreme Federal Court
- In office 3 June 2004 – 29 March 2006
- Vice President: Ellen Gracie
- Preceded by: Maurício Corrêa
- Succeeded by: Ellen Gracie

Minister of Justice
- In office 1 January 1995 – 1 April 1997
- President: Fernando Henrique Cardoso
- Preceded by: Alexandre Dupeyrat Martins
- Succeeded by: Iris Rezende

Member of the Chamber of Deputies
- In office 1 February 1987 – 1 January 1995
- Constituency: Rio Grande do Sul

Personal details
- Born: Nelson Azevedo Jobim; 12 April 1946 (age 80) Santa Maria, Rio Grande do Sul, Brazil
- Party: MDB
- Spouse: Adrienne Nelson de Senna
- Children: 3
- Education: Federal University of Rio Grande do Sul
- Occupation: Partner of BTG Pactual and in charge of Institutional Relations and Compliance Policies
- Other judicial positions: 2004–2006: President, National Justice Council; 2003–2004: Vice President, Supreme Federal Court; 2001–2003: President, Superior Electoral Court; 2001–2001: Vice President, Superior Electoral Court; 1999–2003: Effective Minister, Superior Electoral Court; 1997–1999: Substitute Minister, Superior Electoral Court

Nelson Azevedo Jobim (born 12 April 1946) is a Brazilian jurist, politician and businessman. He held the positions as congressman, Minister of Justice, Minister of Defense, Justice of the Supreme Federal Court (STF), where he was also president from 2004 to 2006. He is a member of the board of directors and responsible for institutional relations and compliance policies at BTG Pactual Bank.

== Biography ==
Jobim was born in Santa Maria, Rio Grande do Sul, he is a distant relative of the musician Tom Jobim, having in common the same great-great-great-uncle, José Martins da Cruz Jobim. He is the son of the lawyer and former state deputy of Rio Grande do Sul Hélvio Jobim and Nami Azevedo Jobim. He has two brothers, Walter Jobim Neto and Hélvio Jobim Filho. His paternal grandfather, lawyer Walter Só Jobim, has been active in politics in Rio Grande do Sul since the 1920s and, in 1947, he was governor of the state. He was married to Edmea Kruel Jobim, with whom he had three children. Later, he married Adrienne Nelson de Senna.

He attended the Universidade Federal do Rio Grande do Sul in Porto Alegre from 1964 to 1968, and graduated with a bachelor's degree in Social and Legal Sciences. He taught philosophy of law and procedural law at the Universidade Federal de Santa Maria.

== Law and teaching career ==
After graduation, he began practicing as a lawyer. He was chairman of the sub-section of the Order of Attorneys of Brazil in Santa Maria from 1977 to 1978, and was vice president of the Rio Grande do Sul section of the Brazilian Bar Association from 1985 to 1986. He was also a member of the Office of Lawyers of Rio Grande do Sul and the Institute of Brazilian Lawyers, based in Rio de Janeiro.

Jobim was an adjunct professor of the Department of Law for the Universidade Federal de Santa Maria from 1980 to 1986. In 2013 he was nominated director of the Center for Technology & Society at Fundação Getulio Vargas. Jobim also is Adjunct Professor of the Department of Law of the Universidade de Brasília in the early 1990s.

== Political career ==
Jobim served in Chamber of Deputies, from 1987 to 1995. During this time, he became the leader of the Brazilian Democratic Movement Party (PMDB) and chaired the Commission on Constitution and Justice and the Editorial Board of Deputies in 1989.

He served as Minister of Justice, from 1 January 1995 to 7 April 1997, under the government of President Fernando Henrique Cardoso. Jobim lobbied for the decriminalization of the use of marijuana, saying: "The drug user must be helped and not persecuted as a criminal; and also was responsible for the demarcation of Indian lands.

== Supreme Court nomination ==
He was nominated to join the Supreme Federal Court in February 1997. After, he was appointed to the post of Minister of the Federal Supreme Court, on 7 April 1997, and took office on the 15th, filling the vacancy caused by the retirement of Francisco Rezek. During his time as Supreme Court Justice, Jobim chaired the elections of October 2002; and was elected Vice-President of the Supreme Court, on 9 April 2003.

=== Presidency of the Supreme Federal Court ===
He was elected to Presidency of the Supreme Court on 19 May 2004, and assumed on 3 June 2004. He voluntarily retired from the Court shortly before the end of his term, on 6 March 2006.

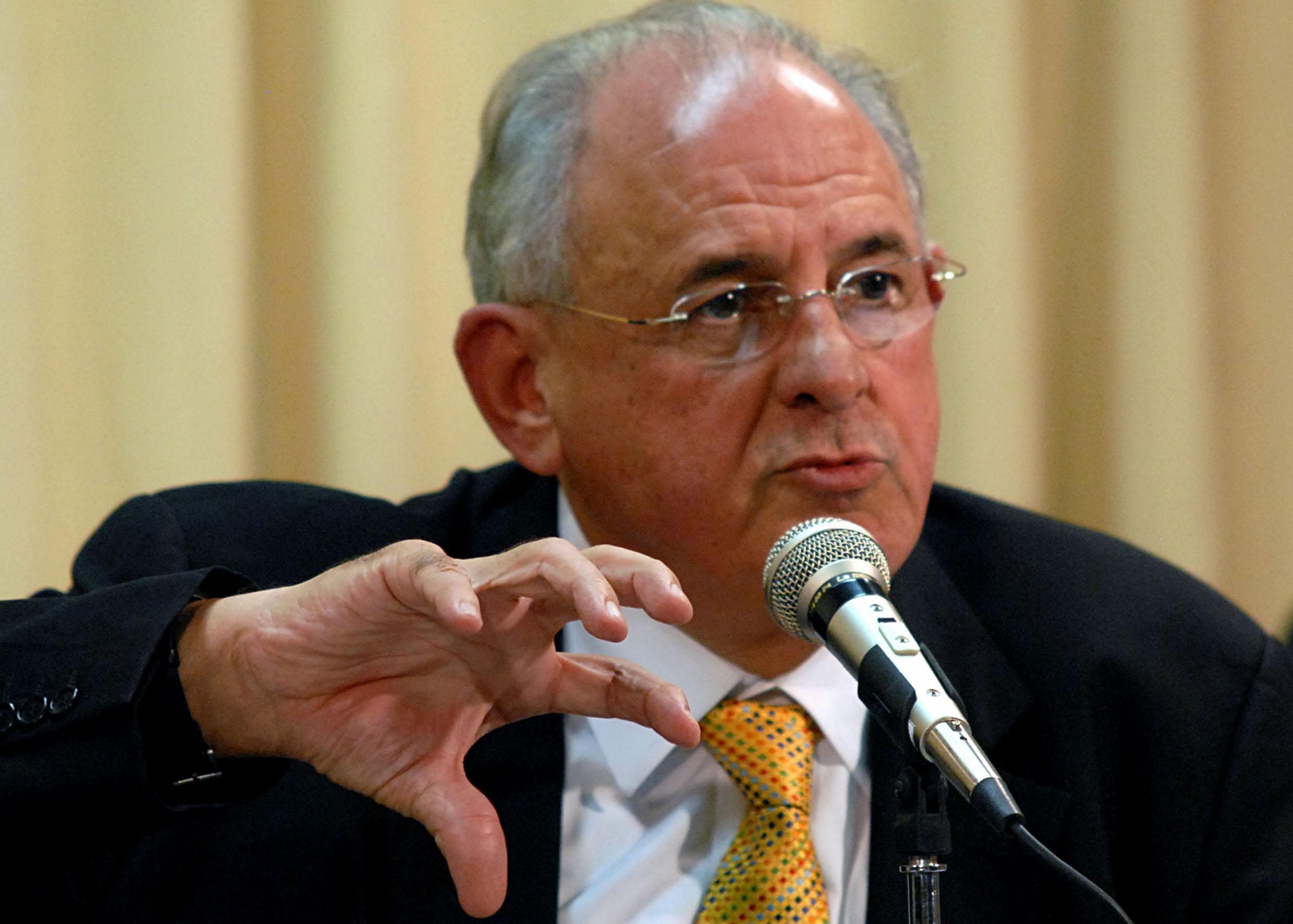
Ministry of Defense, 2008

== Ministry of Defense ==
He was the Defense Minister of Brazil from July 2007 until August 2011. President Luiz Inácio Lula da Silva appointed him to the position after the aviation crisis of 2006–2007. In 2009, after the flight disappearance Air France Flight 447, Jobim worked with French Government to rescue the casualties.

== BTG Pactual ==
Since July 2016, he is a member of the Board of Directors of BTG Pactual bank. In April 2018, he became president of the bank's Board of Directors, remaining as Chairman until April 2022, when he was replaced by André Esteves. Jobim continued to be part of the Board of Directors in addition to being responsible for Institutional Relations and Compliance Policies.

Persio Arida announced the join of former Minister Jobim and stated: "The arrival of ex-Minister Nelson Jobim is another important step towards improving management standards and practices at BTG Pactual. His outstanding track record, experience and knowledge will help to further enhance the Bank's governance".

Political offices
Preceded by Alexandre Dupeyrat Martins	Minister of Justice; 1995–1997	Succeeded by Iris Rezende
Preceded by Waldir Pires	Minister of Defence; 2007–2011	Succeeded by Celso Amorim
Legal offices
Preceded by Francisco Rezek	Justice of the Supreme Federal Court; 1997–2006	Succeeded by Cármen Lúcia
Preceded by Maurício Corrêa	President of the Superior Electoral Court; 2001–2003	Succeeded by Sepúlveda Pertence
Preceded by Maurício Corrêa	President of the Supreme Federal Court; 2004–2006	Succeeded by Ellen Gracie
