= Marco Aurélio Mello =

Brazilian justice

His Excellency Marco Aurélio Mello
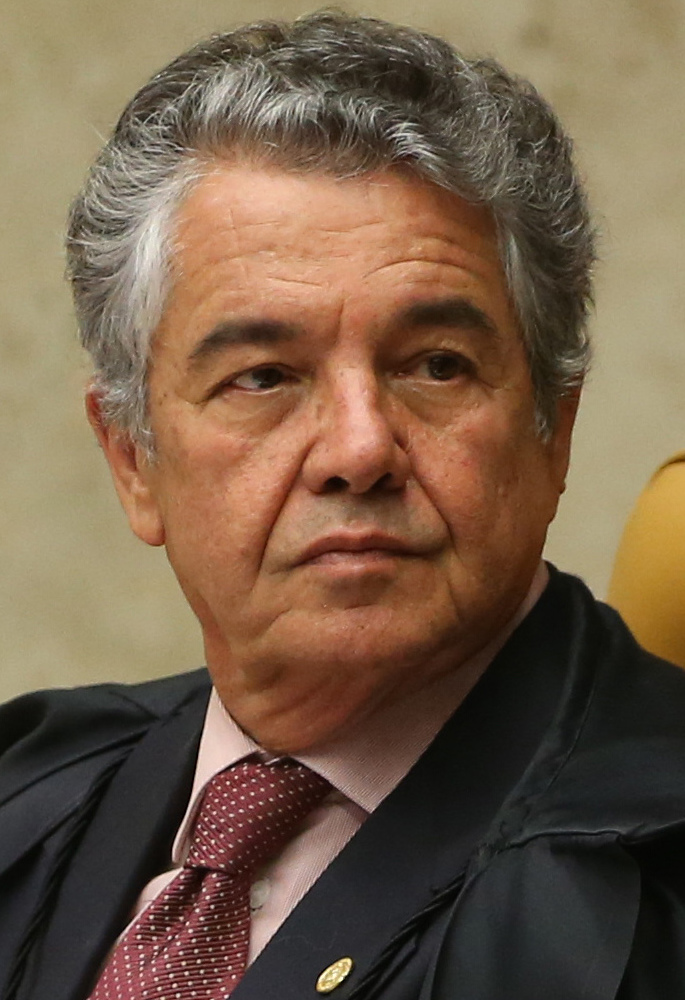
- Mello in 2017

Justice of the Supreme Federal Court
- In office 13 June 1990 – 9 July 2021
- Nominated by: Fernando Collor de Mello
- Preceded by: Carlos Madeira
- Succeeded by: André Mendonça

49th President of the Supreme Federal Court
- In office 27 May 2001 – 5 June 2003
- Vice President: Maurício Corrêa
- Preceded by: Carlos Velloso
- Succeeded by: Maurício Corrêa

Justice of the Superior Labor Court
- In office 10 September 1981 – 11 June 1990
- Nominated by: João Figueiredo
- Preceded by: Hildebrando Bisaglia
- Succeeded by: Manoel Mendes de Freitas

Personal details
- Born: 12 July 1946 (age 80) Rio de Janeiro, Brazil
- Spouse: Sandra De Santis Mendes
- Education: Federal University of Rio de Janeiro (UFRJ)

Marco Aurélio Mendes de Farias Mello (born 12 July 1946, Rio de Janeiro) is a Brazilian former justice of the Supreme Federal Court of Brazil, appointed to the position by his cousin, former President of Brazil Fernando Collor de Mello.

In a controversial decision in October 2012, Marco Aurélio Mello released from jail Luiz André Ferreira da Silva, a politician of the city of Rio de Janeiro who had been arrested for involvement with the Milícia Mafia in Rio de Janeiro.

In 2020, Marco Aurélio Mello released Brazilian drug warlord André do Rap. The decision was reversed just a few hours later by the President of the Brazilian Supreme Court who ordered that the drug warlord be put back in jail, but by then he had become a fugitive.

Marco Aurélio retired from the STF on 9 July 2021.

Legal offices
Preceded by Hildebrando Bisaglia	Justice of the Superior Labour Court; 1981–1990	Succeeded by Manoel Mendes de Freitas
Preceded by Carlos Madeira	Justice of the Supreme Federal Court; 1990–2021	Succeeded by André Mendonça
Preceded by Carlos Velloso	President of the Supreme Federal Court; 2001–2003	Succeeded by Maurício Corrêa
