= Rosa Weber =

Brazilian judge and former Minister of the Supreme Court (born 1948)

Her Excellency Rosa Weber
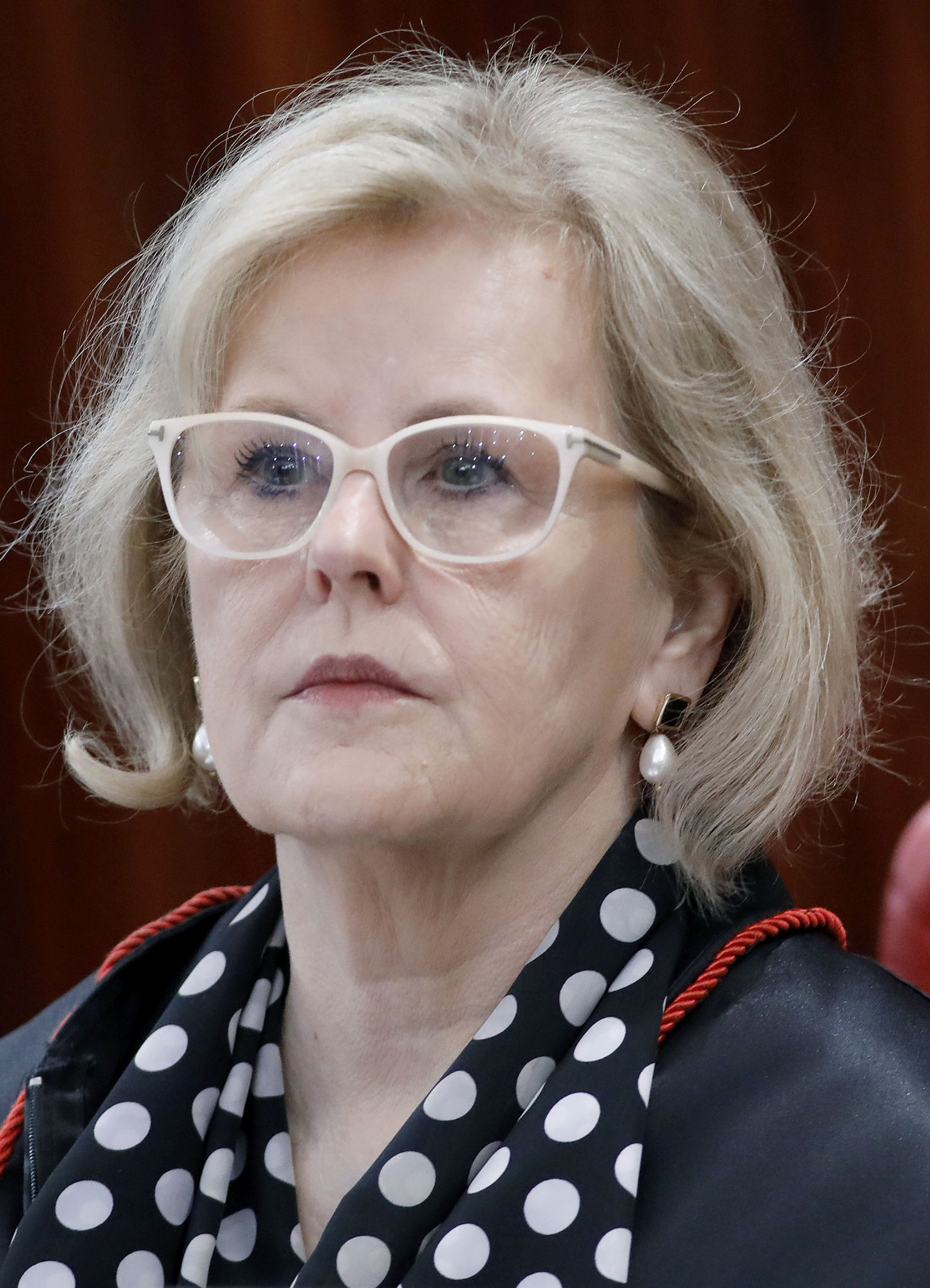
- Weber in October 2019

President of the Supreme Federal Court
- In office 12 September 2022 – 28 September 2023
- Vice President: Luís Roberto Barroso
- Preceded by: Luiz Fux
- Succeeded by: Luís Roberto Barroso

Justice of the Supreme Federal Court
- In office 19 December 2011 – 29 September 2023
- Nominated by: Dilma Rousseff
- Preceded by: Ellen Gracie
- Succeeded by: Flávio Dino

Personal details
- Born: Rosa Maria Pires Weber; 2 October 1948 (age 78) Porto Alegre, Rio Grande do Sul, Brazil
- Spouse: Telmo Candiota da Rosa Filho
- Children: 2
- Education: Federal University of Rio Grande do Sul (LL.B.)
- Other judicial positions: 2020–2022: Vice President, Supreme Federal Court; 2018–2020: President, Superior Electoral Court; 2018: Vice President, Superior Electoral Court; 2016–2020: Effective Justice, Superior Electoral Court; 2012–2016: Substitute Justice, Superior Electoral Court; 2006–2011: Justice, Superior Labour Court

Rosa Maria Pires Weber (Note: Previously known by her married name, Rosa Maria Weber Candiota da Rosa.) [ˈʁɔ.zɐ ˈve.beɾ](born 2 October 1948) is a Brazilian magistrate, former justice and former president of the Supreme Federal Court, former president of the Superior Electoral Court and former justice of the Superior Labor Court.

== Academic career ==
Rosa Weber was approved in first place in a vestibular exam to course Law at the Law School of Federal University of Rio Grande do Sul. She graduated in 1971, also in first place, and received an "academic laureate Prof. Brochado da Rocha". At the same university, she took a university extension course on Preparation for the Judiciary in 1972 and for Labour Procedure in 1974. She was a professor at the Law School of the Pontifical Catholic University of Rio Grande do Sul between 1989 and 1990.

== Judiciary career ==
She had served as protocol assistant at the Sectional Inspectorate of the Ministry of Education, in Porto Alegre, in 1968; superior assistant of the State Department of Administration of Rio Grande do Sul, from 1974 to 1975; and labour auditor at the Regional Labour Police Station of Rio Grande do Sul, from 1975 to 1976.

=== Labour Justice ===
She joined the judiciary in 1976, through a civil service examination, as a substitute labour judge. In 1991, Weber was promoted to the second degree of jurisdiction, becoming desembargadora of the Regional Labour Court of the 4th Region. She held many administrative positions before reaching the court's presidency, serving from 2001 to 2003.

In 2006, she was appointed by president Luiz Inácio Lula da Silva for the position of justice of the Superior Labour Court, from a triple list voted by the court's members, for a position for career judges. After hearing in the Senate, her nomination was approved by a vote of 44–7. She was sworn in on 21 February 2006.

=== Supreme Federal Court ===
On 8 November 2011, Weber was officially appointed by president Dilma Rousseff for a position left by the retirement of justice Ellen Gracie Northfleet in the Supreme Federal Court.

After a hearing at the Constitution and Justice Committee, her nomination was approved in a vote of 19–3. On 13 December, the Senate floor ratified the approval in a voting of 57–14 and 1 abstention. During the session, two senators voiced against her nomination: Demóstenes Torres (DEM-GO) - who would later be removed from office - and Pedro Taques (PDT-MS). They stated that Rosa Weber did not demonstrate that she had the constitutional requirement of "remarkable legal knowledge" during the hearing, as she didn't answer many questions posed by the senators. Among the supporting senators, senator Marcelo Crivella (PRB-RJ) said he saw in the justice a keen understanding of the "spirit of the law", senator Pedro Simon (PMDB-RS) stated that Weber was shy and tense during the hearing, but praised her history, and senator José Pimentel (PT-CE) affirmed that her legal knowledge had been verified in a previous hearing, when Weber was approved for justice of the Superior Labour Court, position that also demand this requirement.

Sworn in on the morning of 19 December 2011, she is the third woman to serve on the Supreme Court, following Ellen Gracie, who Weber replaced, and Cármen Lúcia, who's still in office. Among them, Weber is the only career judge.

She had served as a justice of the Superior Electoral Court from May 2016 to May 2020, in a position equivalent to that of Supreme Court members, and as the court's president from 14 August 2018 to 25 May 2020. On 10 August 2022, she was elected president of the Supreme Court, taking office later on 12 September. After September 30, 2023, she retired from her position as Minister of the Supreme Court, before her compulsory retirement upon reaching the age of 75.

== Personal life ==
Daughter of physician José Júlio Martins Weber and rancher Zilah Bastos Pires, she is married to Telmo Candiota da Rosa Filho, retired prosecutor of Rio Grande do Sul, with whom she has two children.

Weber is a fan of the football team Sport Club Internacional.

== Notes ==
Legal offices
New seat	Justice of the Superior Labour Court; 2006–2011	Succeeded by Hugo Carlos Scheuermann
Preceded by Ellen Gracie	Justice of the Supreme Federal Court; 2011–2023	Succeeded by Flávio Dino
Preceded by Luiz Fux	President of the Superior Electoral Court; 2018–2020	Succeeded by Luís Roberto Barroso
Preceded by Luiz Fux	Vice President of the Superior Electoral Court; 2018	Succeeded by Luís Roberto Barroso
Preceded by Luiz Fux	Vice President of the Supreme Federal Court; 2020–2022	Succeeded by Luís Roberto Barroso
Preceded by Luiz Fux	President of the Supreme Federal Court; 2022–2023	Succeeded by Luís Roberto Barroso
