= Mansueto Almeida =

Brazilian economist (born 1967)

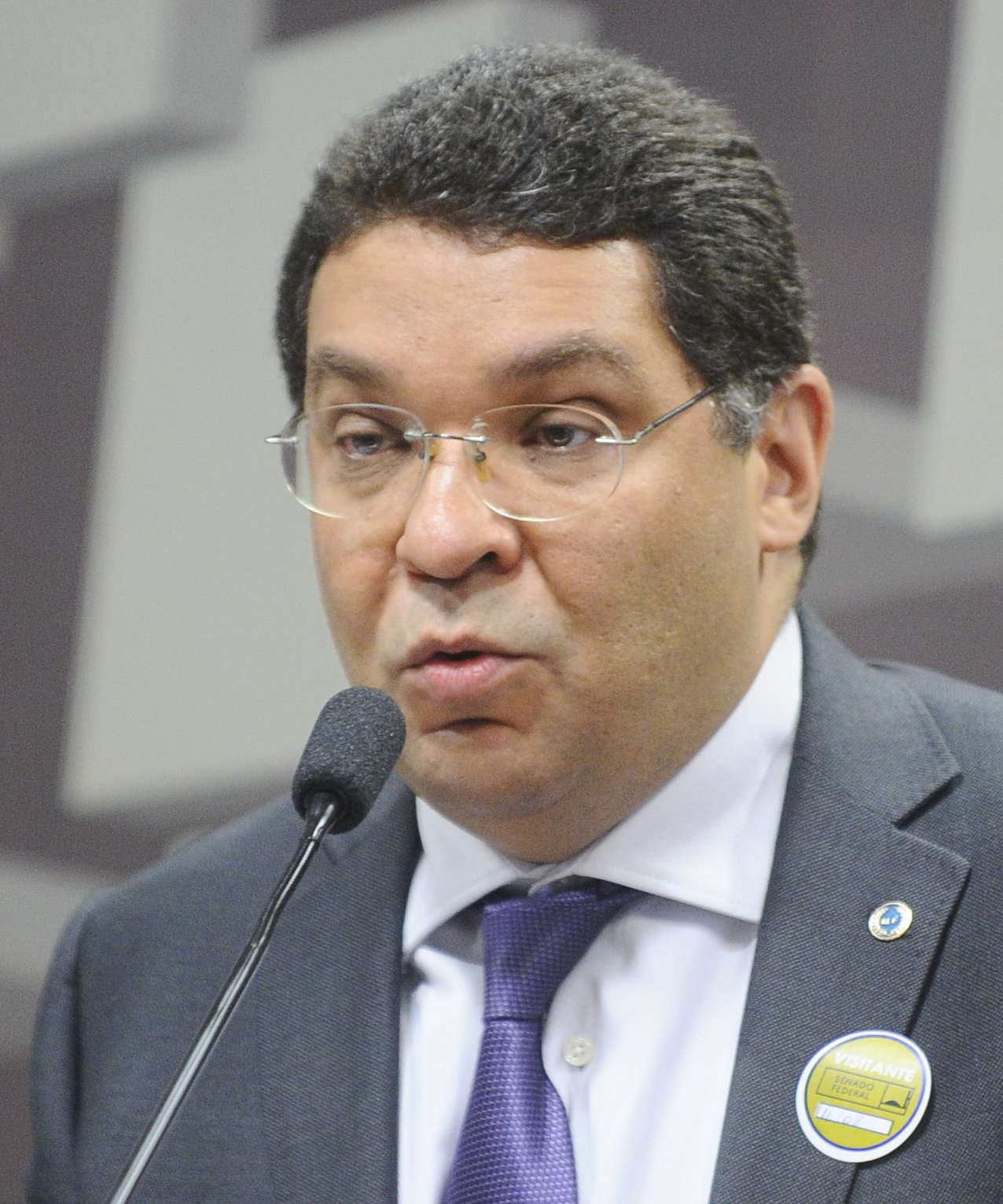
- Mansueto in 2016

Secretary of the National Treasury
- In office 15 April 2018 – 15 July 2020
- Minister: Eduardo Guardia; Paulo Guedes
- Preceded by: Ana Paula Vescovi
- Succeeded by: Bruno Funchal

Secretary of Economic Monitoring of the Ministry of Finance
- In office 17 May 2016 – 15 April 2018
- Minister: Henrique Meirelles; Eduardo Guardia
- Succeeded by: Alexandre Manoel Angelo da Silva

Personal details
- Born: Mansueto Facundo de Almeida Júnior; 20 September 1967 (age 59) Fortaleza, Ceará, Brazil
- Education: Federal University of Ceará (B.Ec); University of São Paulo (M.Ec)
- Profession: Economist

Mansueto Facundo de Almeida Júnior (born 20 September 1967) is a Brazilian economist and businessman.

In May 2016, the then-researcher at IPEA was invited by Minister Henrique Meirelles to join the economic team of the Ministry of Finance, initially taking on the position of Secretary of Economic Monitoring. In that Secretariat, he oversaw fiscal policy, a former responsibility of the National Treasury, in addition to handling the economic reform plans of Michel Temer's government. In January 2018, he became head of the Secretariat of Fiscal Monitoring. In April of the same year, he was appointed Secretary of the National Treasury, a position he held until July 2020. He is considered one of the country's leading experts on public accounts. He is currently a partner and chief economist at BTG Pactual.
