= Ilan Goldfajn =

Brazilian economist (born 1966)

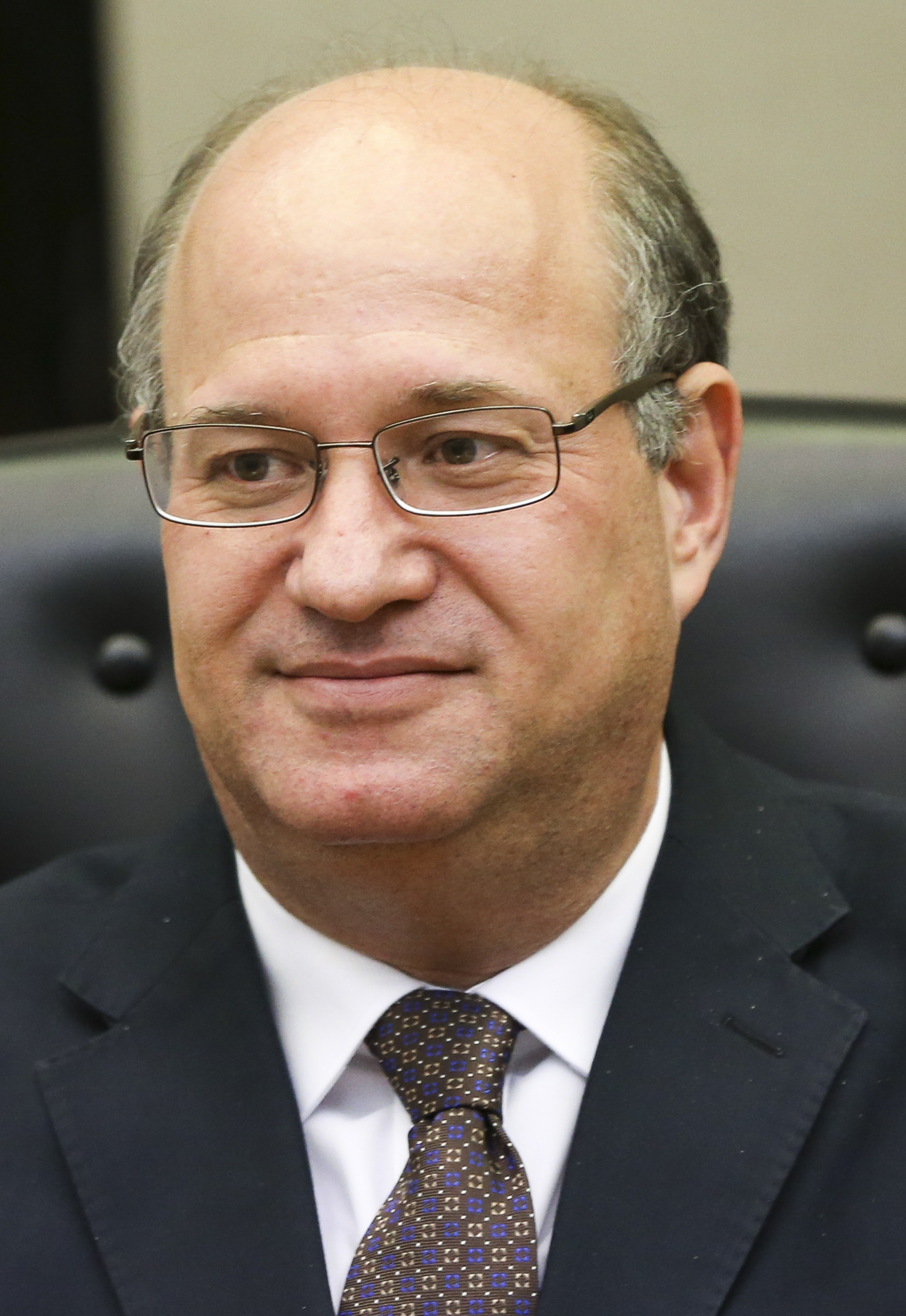

President of the Inter-American Development Bank
- Incumbent
- Assumed office 19 December 2022
- Preceded by: Reina Mejía (Acting)

President of the Central Bank of Brazil
- In office 9 June 2016 – 28 February 2019
- Appointed by: Michel Temer
- Preceded by: Alexandre Tombini
- Succeeded by: Roberto Campos Neto

Personal details
- Born: 12 March 1966 (age 60) Haifa, Israel
- Citizenship: Brazilian; Israeli
- Education: Federal University of Rio de Janeiro (BA); Pontifical Catholic University of Rio de Janeiro (MA); Massachusetts Institute of Technology (PhD)
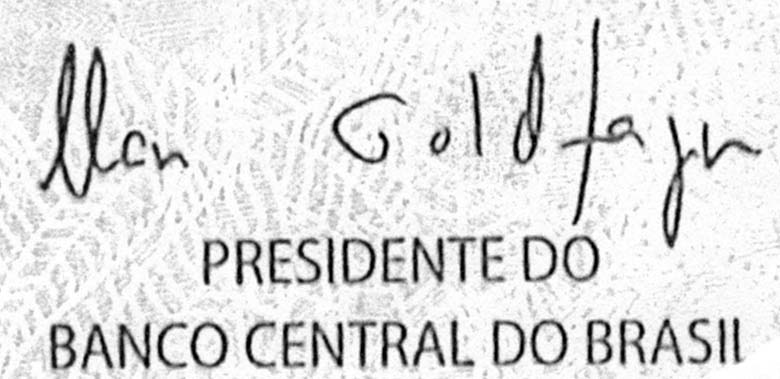
- Signature

Academic background
- Doctoral advisor: Rudiger Dornbusch; Stanley Fischer

Ilan Goldfajn ( Hebrew: אילן גולדפיין; born 12 March 1966) is an Israeli-Brazilian economist, former governor of the Central Bank of Brazil and former director of the International Monetary Fund's Western Hemisphere Department. In December 2022, he became president of the Inter-American Development Bank.

Ilan Goldfajn has served as president of the IDB Group since December 2022. During his presidency, the IDB Group launched a series of institutional reforms known as IDBImpact+, including a new institutional strategy, reforms to IDB Invest, and a new framework for IDB Lab. The reforms were intended to expand the institution's financing capacity, increase private-sector mobilization, and deliver greater development impact across Latin America and the Caribbean. Under his leadership, the IDB Group also expanded regional programs and thematic initiatives and increased its focus on private-sector-led development.

== Biography ==
Goldfajn was born in Haifa, Israel. He is Jewish. He graduated in economics from the Federal University of Rio de Janeiro, received a master's degree from the Pontifical Catholic University of Rio de Janeiro and a doctorate from MIT where he completed his dissertation under the advisory of Stanley Fischer and Rudi Dornbusch.

He was appointed to the position of governor of the Central Bank of Brazil by Minister of Finance Henrique Meirelles on 12 May 2016. He oversaw the implementation of significant regulatory changes that opened the door to new players in the financial services industry, spurred innovation and digitalization, and fostered the growth of fintech companies, all of which bolstered Brazil's financial sector. This included the development of the public instant payment system Pix.

Goldfajn was chosen central banker of the year by The Banker magazine in 2017, and best central banker by Global Finance magazine in 2018.

On 13 September 2021, he was appointed Director of the IMF's Western Hemisphere Department by Director-General Kristalina Georgieva, to assume office on 3 January 2022. He helped countries implement IMF-supported programs to address an array of challenges and also contributed to shaping the region's policy dialogue on climate change, which led to the IMF's first Resilience and Sustainability Facility.

On 20 November 2022, he was elected president of the Inter-American Development Bank, assuming office on 19 December of the same year.

Goldfajn's private-sector experience includes key positions at three of Brazil's leading financial institutions: chief economist and partner at Itaú Unibanco, founding partner at Ciano Investimentos, and partner and economist at Gávea Investimentos. He also served as chairman of Credit Suisse Brazil's Advisory Board.

Goldfajn has also held several consultant roles at top international finance and governance institutions, including the World Bank, the United Nations and the IMF.

He has taught economics at various universities in Brazil (including the Pontifical Catholic University of Rio de Janeiro) and the United States, has been an editor of several publications and has published numerous articles and books.

Goldfajn speaks English, Portuguese, Spanish and Hebrew.

== Bibliography ==
- Francesco Giavazzi; Ilan Goldfajn; Santiago Herrera (2005). Inflation Targeting, Debt, and the Brazilian Experience, 1999 to 2003. MIT Press. ISBN 978-0-262-07259-5.
- Ilan Goldfajn; André Minella (2005). Capital Flows and Controls in Brazil: What Have We Learned?. National Bureau of Economic Research.

Government offices
| Preceded by Alexandre Tombini | President of the Central Bank of Brazil; 2016–2019 | Succeeded by Roberto Campos Neto |
Diplomatic posts
| Preceded by Reina Mejía; Acting | President of the Inter-American Development Bank; 2022–present | Incumbent |
