= Ethswitch =

EthSwitch
- Developer: Ethswitch S.C
- Website: ethswitch.com

EthSwitch S.C. is the national switch of Ethiopia, established in 2011.It is a share company owned by all banks (both private and public) and the National Bank of Ethiopia.

EthSwitch is mandated to provide simple, affordable, secure, and efficient e-payment infrastructure services to users in Ethiopia.

== History ==
EthSwitch was founded in 2011 and became active in 2016. It was established with the support of the Ethiopian Bankers' Association and the National Bank of Ethiopia. Since 2016, EthSwitch has enabled interoperability of ATMs and POS terminals operated by all banks. EthSwitch has also been assigned major responsibilities by the central bank to realize financial inclusivity targets.

In November 2023, EthSwitch signed a memorandum of understanding with the National Payments Corporation of India (NPCI) to streamline a national payment system.

== Services ==
EthSwitch provides a range of services aimed at modernizing and streamlining the payment ecosystem in Ethiopia:

- ATM Interoperability: EthSwitch connected ATM's from all banks to be interoperable with each other.
- POS Interoperability: Like ATM's this enables POS machines accept all bank's cards
- Interoperable QR code: Through Ethswitch, Banks can now offer individual merchants interoperable physical QR code that lets customers pay for goods and services from any bank to any bank.
- National Payment Gateway: EthSwitch provides a national payment gateway,enabling online payment services for eCommerce merchants.
- Card Services: EthSwitch provides domestic card scheme with Ethiopay ATM card services co-branded with banks.
- Dispute Management and Fraud Monitoring: As a national payment gateway provider, EthSwitch provides dispute management and fraud monitoring services for all interoperability transactions.
- Shared Infrastructure: EthSwitch provides shared platform and infrastructure services for all banks to use. a few banks already use ethswitch's system

=== Security ===
To enhance its security posture, EthSwitch has implemented several measures:

- Next-Generation Firewalls (NGFW): Redundant NGFWs are deployed to secure the network perimeter and internal server farm segments.
- Web Application Firewall (WAF): A WAF protects web-based e-commerce applications from common and sophisticated attacks, including the OWASP Top 10 web application threats.
- Multi-Factor Authentication (MFA): A robust MFA solution strengthens user verification processes and access controls.
- Shared Security Operation Center: EthSwitch is implementing a shared security operation center in collaboration with the Information Network Security Administration (INSA).

Ethswitch is compliant to the PCI DSS specification, allowing it to process mastercard and visa card payments directly.

== Threats to payment processors ==
Local payment processing intermediaries could face disruption due to the National Payment Gateway (NPG) by EthSwitch. some are :

Disintermediation : The NPG potentially enables integration between banks and merchants directly, bypassing third-party payment processors and proprietary gateways. However, due to pressures, EthSwitch has opted to preserve intermediaries, and will not let individual eCommerce merchants access to its APIs directly.

Banks Integrating Payment Processing : Direct access to EthSwitch via the National Payment Gateway (NPG) now allows traditional banks to function as payment processors. They can also offer innovative digital services directly to their e-commerce merchants at lower fees to acquire customers into their main banking operation.

Some fintech executives have countered that banks possess weak technological expertise and capabilities in the realm of online payments, which require specialized skills banks do not have.

== Comparison with similar systems ==
EthSwitch is largely modeled after India's UPI, similar services include brazil's Pix and US's FedNow.

The following table presents a comparison between Ethswitch and its highly similar counterparts

Feature	EthSwitch	UPI (India)	Pix (Brazil)
Country	Ethiopia	India	Brazil
Launch Year	2011 (Active since 2016)	2016	2020
Owner	Share company (all banks)	NPCI (Nonprofit)	Central Bank of Brazil
ATM Interoperability	Fully Supported	Fully Supported	Fully Supported
POS Interoperability	Fully Supported	Fully Supported	Fully Supported
QR Interoperability	Partially Supported	Fully Supported	Fully Supported
Fees for P2P	0.4%/100ETB	free	free
Fees for merchants	similar to P2P	free	0.2% maximum (may be waived)
Profitability	for profit	non-profit	cost recovery
Access	Through member financial institutions	Through UPI-enabled mobile applications	Through bank accounts or digital wallets

== See also ==
- National Bank of Ethiopia
- Payment system
- Pix
- Unified Payments Interface (UPI)
