= Ana Paula Vescovi =

Brazilian economist (born 1969)

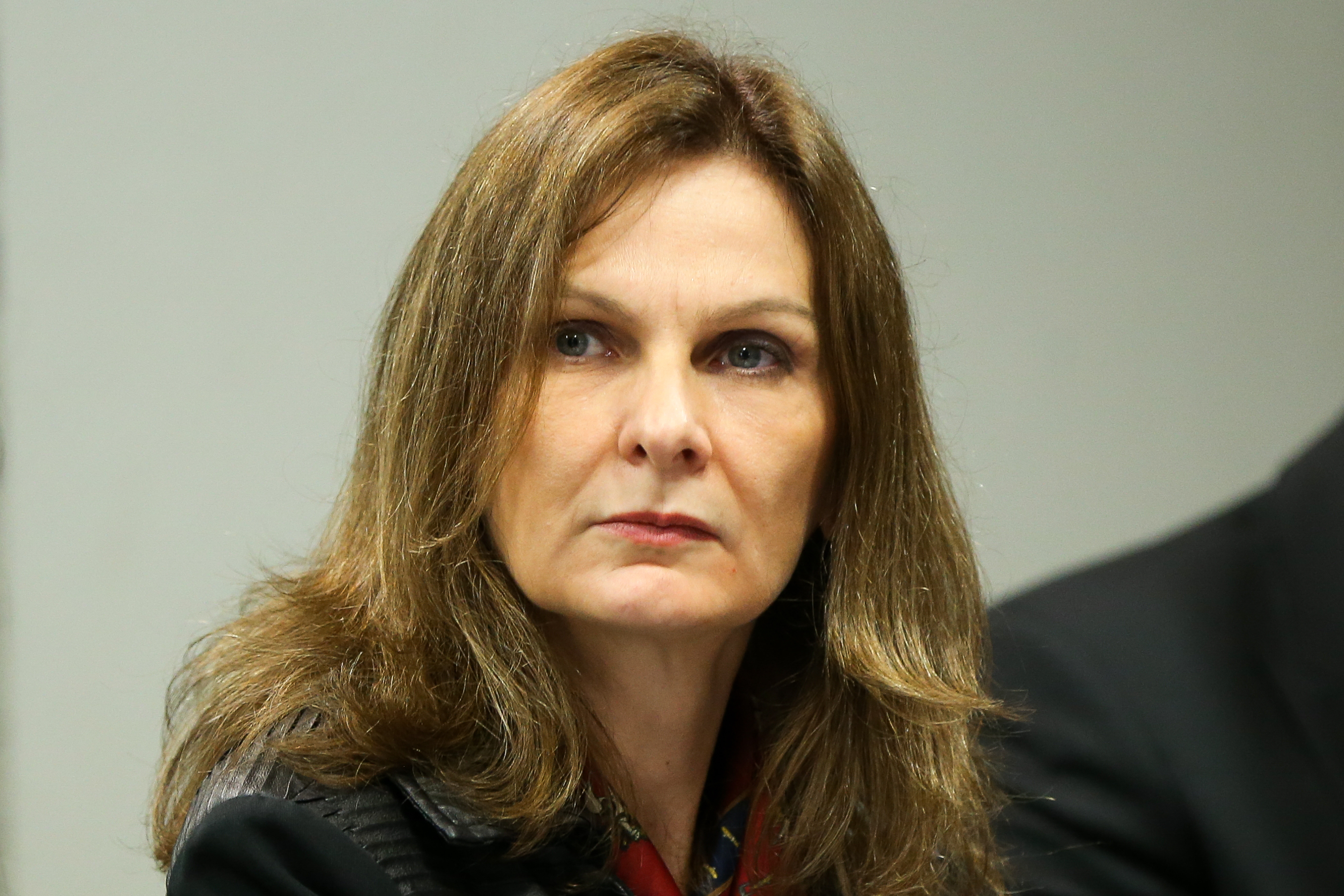
- Vescovi in 2017

Executive-Secretary of the Ministry of Finance
- In office 11 April 2018 – 1 January 2019
- Minister: Eduardo Guardia
- Preceded by: Eduardo Guardia
- Succeeded by: Marcelo Guaranys

Secretary of the National Treasury
- In office 6 June 2016 – 11 April 2018
- Minister: Henrique Meirelles
- Preceded by: Otávio Ladeira
- Succeeded by: Mansueto Almeida

Secretary of Finance of Espírito Santo
- In office 1 January 2015 – 2 June 2016
- Governor: Paulo Hartung
- Preceded by: Maurício Cézar Duque
- Succeeded by: Cristiane Mendonça (acting)

Personal details
- Born: Ana Paula Vescovi; 8 April 1969 (age 57) Colatina, Espírito Santo, Brazil
- Education: University of Brasília (M.Ec)
- Profession: Economist

Ana Paula Vitali Janes Vescovi (born 8 April 1969) is a Brazilian economist who served as Secretary of the National Treasury and Executive Secretary of the Ministry of Finance under president Michel Temer, from 2016 to 2018. She also served as chief economist and Director of Macroeconomics at Banco Santander in Brazil from 2019 to 2026, and as a member of the Board of Directors and the Audit and Risk Committee of Ultrapar.
