= Teori Zavascki =

Brazilian judge

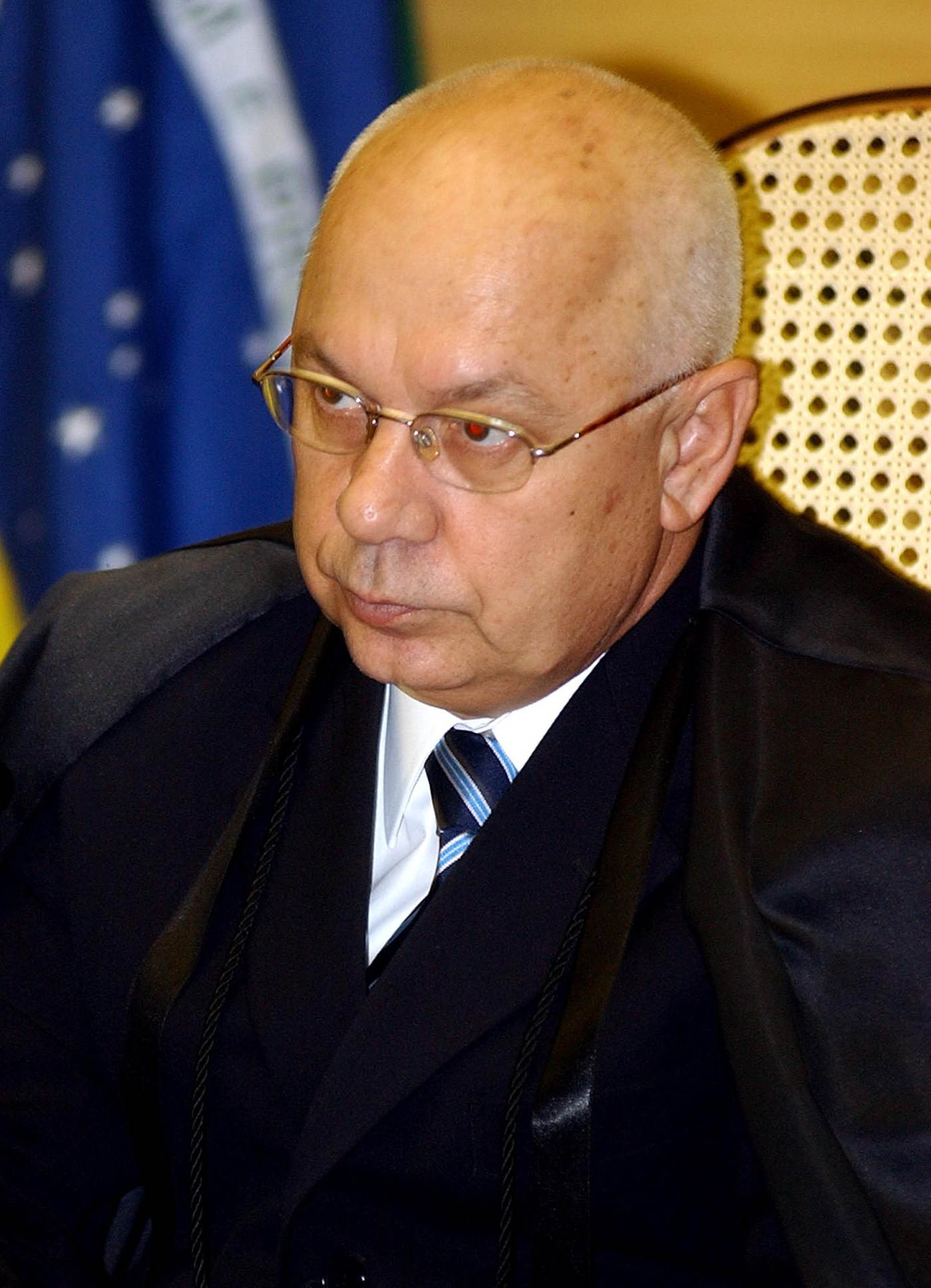

Justice of the Supreme Federal Court
- In office 29 November 2012 – 19 January 2017
- Appointed by: Dilma Rousseff
- Preceded by: Cezar Peluso
- Succeeded by: Alexandre de Moraes

Justice of the Superior Court of Justice
- In office 8 May 2003 – 29 November 2012
- Appointed by: Luiz Inácio Lula da Silva
- Preceded by: Jacy Garcia Vieira
- Succeeded by: Regina Helena Costa

Personal details
- Born: Teori Albino Zavascki; 15 August 1948 Faxinal dos Guedes, Santa Catarina, Brazil
- Died: 19 January 2017 (aged 68) Paraty, Rio de Janeiro, Brazil
- Cause of death: Plane crash
- Resting place: Jardim da Paz Cemitery; Porto Alegre, Rio Grande do Sul, Brazil
- Spouse(s): Liana Maria Prehn (m. 1972; div. 2004) Maria Helena Marques de Castro (m. 2004; died 2013)
- Children: Alexandre Prehn Zavascki; Liliana Maria Prehn Zavascki; Francisco Prehn Zavascki
- Parents: Severino Zavascki (father); Pia Maria Fontana (mother)
- Education: Law School, Federal University of Rio Grande do Sul (UFRGS)
- Occupation: Judge

Teori Albino Zavascki (15 August 1948 – 19 January 2017) was a Brazilian judge who served as Justice of the Superior Court of Justice from 8 May 2003 until 29 November 2012, appointed by President Luiz Inácio Lula da Silva, and as Justice of the Supreme Federal Court of Brazil from 29 November 2012 until his death on 19 January 2017, having been appointed to the position by President Dilma Rousseff. At the time of his death he was the justice in charge of the trials resulting from Operation Car Wash.

== Death ==
Zavascki was killed in an airplane crash in Paraty, Rio de Janeiro around 2:00 PM (16:00 GMT) on Thursday, 19 January 2017. Official enquiries into the crash began on 20 January and the cockpit voice recorder was recovered. Also killed were four other people on board, including the pilot, and Carlos Alberto Fernandes Filgueiras, a partner in BTG Pactual, whose president, André Esteves, had been arrested in the Operation Car Wash investigation. More than 200 politicians and business people were possibly implicated in a graft scheme that Zavascki was investigating.

=== Final investigation results ===
On 22 January 2018, the Aeronautical Accidents Investigation and Prevention Center (Centro de Investigação e Prevenção de Accidentes Aeronáuticos, CENIPA) presented their final report. The conclusion was that there was no shortage of kerosene. The crash was attributed to three major factors:

- Bad visual climate conditions. At the time of the crash, the horizontal visibility was 1500 meters and the rainfall was 25 mm/h.
- Cultural practices of the pilots: the investigations found that several pilots who fly in the region relied heavily on their experience and do not follow strict security procedures, including informal practices which inhibit an adequate analysis of the risks involved in this specific landing procedure.
- Spatial disorientation: as a consequence of the bad visibility, the flight curve executed, the low level above the sea and the stress of the pilot, he probably lost control of the plane.

Legal offices
Preceded by Jacy Garcia Vieira	Justice of the Superior Court of Justice; 2003–12	Succeeded by Regina Helena Costa
Preceded by Cezar Peluso	Justice of the Supreme Federal Court; 2012–17	Succeeded by Alexandre de Moraes
