= BSI Ltd =

Ticino-based Swiss bank

Coordinates: 46.0041°N 8.9525°E

- Company type: Aktiengesellschaft
- Industry: Financial services
- Founded: 1873; 153 years ago
- Headquarters: Via Magatti 2 Lugano, Switzerland
- Key people: Joachim H. Straehle (Chairman); Thomas A. Mueller (CEO)
- Products: private banking, asset management
- AUM: CHF 84.3 billion (2015)
- Website: www.bsibank.com

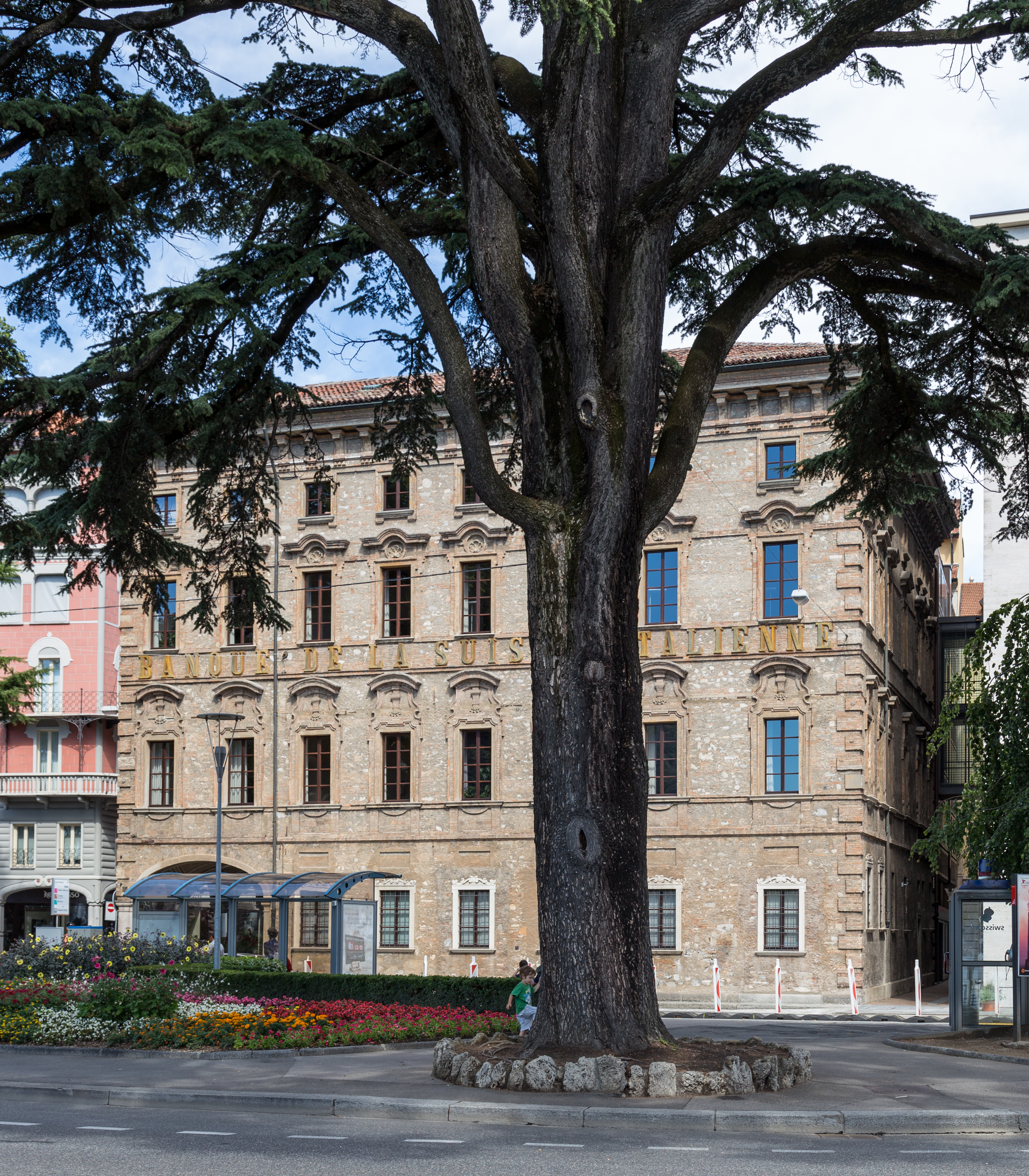
BSI in Lugano

BSI had been the oldest bank in the Swiss canton of Ticino until its integration into EFG Bank and the following renaming into EFG, which took place in 2017. Founded in 1873 in Lugano as the Banca della Svizzera Italiana, BSI was an institution that specialises in asset management and related services for private and institutional clients. In 1998, the bank became part of the Italian Generali group, one of the world's biggest insurance companies. In July 2014, Generali sold BSI to BTG Pactual for US$1.7 billion, a deal that CEO of the bank, André Esteves stated would make BTG Pactual a “global player in the asset management arena.”

In February 2016, EFG International (SIX:EFGN), the global private banking group based in Zurich, announced the acquisition of the Lugano-based private bank, according to an agreement signed on 21 February 2016 with BSI's sole shareholder BTG Pactual. The transaction was finalized on November 1, 2016. Following the closing, BSI's activities have been integrated into EFG, market by market, in Singapore, Hong Kong, the Bahamas, Switzerland, and Luxembourg. The integration of Monaco's activities is expected to take place by the end of the second quarter of 2017. With the integration of the Swiss business, which took place in April 2017, the rollout of the renewed EFG brand has started in all locations where the legal integration of BSI has been completed, and those businesses will operate solely under the EFG name.

== History ==
In 1873, BSI opened its main office on Piazza della Riforma in Lugano. The next year, the bank opened its first branch, this in Locarno. Branches in Bellinzona (1879) and Chiasso (1906) followed. In 1880, BSI relocated its headquarters to the historic Palazzo dei Marchesi Riva, which dates back to 1747, where the headquarters of the Bank are located to this day.

- 1881: BSI is the only bank in Ticino authorised to issue banknotes until 1907
- 1935: BSI opens a branch office in Zurich
- 1969: The start of international expansion
- 1973: One hundredth anniversary of BSI. BSI opens the St.Moritz branch
- 1975: BSI extends its reach to the French-speaking part of Switzerland.
- 1976: BSI opens its first representation in South America, in Caracas, Venezuela.
- 1981: Opening of the Hong Kong office.
- 1988: BSI extends its activities to the Principality of Monaco.
- 1998: Assicurazioni Generali, Trieste, becomes the sole shareholder
- 2000: As of 1 January, Banca della Svizzera Italiana is officially renamed BSI SA. In November, it opened new offices in Lausanne.
- 2005: Opens BSI Bank Ltd in Singapore
- 2005: September - The new BSI building opens at Via Canova 6, Lugano.
- 2006: BSI acquires Banca Unione di Credito.
- 2008: BSI acquires Banca del Gottardo and opens a representative office in Bahrain
- 2011: BSI expands in Asia and obtains a banking license to open a branch in Hong Kong
- 2013: BSI expands into Italy and obtains a banking licence to open the Italian branch of BSI Europe in Milan.
- 2014: BSI opens a branch in Panama
- 2015:
  - After the launch of the branch in Milan, BSI opens a second Italian branch in Como
  - On 14 July 2014, the Brazilian group BTG Pactual purchased BSI, subject to approval by the Swiss Financial Market Supervisory Authority (FINMA).
  - From 15 September BSI is a subsidiary of BTG Pactual.
- 2016: In February, EFG International (SIX:EFGN), the global private banking group based in Zurich, announced that it is to acquire BSI, according to an agreement signed on 21 February 2016 with BSI's sole shareholder BTG Pactual. The transaction was finalized on 1 November.
- 2016: In May, the Monetary Authority of Singapore (MAS) announced that it had served BSI Bank (Singapore) Limited notice of intention to withdraw its status as a merchant bank in Singapore for serious breaches of anti-money laundering requirements, poor management oversight of the bank's operations, and gross misconduct by some of the bank's staff.
- November 2016 - BSI Singapore is fully integrated into EFG under an accelerated asset deal
- March 2017 - BSI Hong Kong is fully integrated into EFG
- April 2017 - BSI Switzerland integration is completed. The roll-out of the new EFG brand beings in locations where the legal integration of BSI is completed
- May 2017: BSI's entity in Luxembourg has been migrated to EFG Bank in Luxembourg

== Product and Services ==
=== Private banking ===
- Management mandate
- Personalised mandate
- Advisory services
- Fund-based accumulation plans
- BSI investment funds
- Selection of third-party funds
- Alternative investments
- Structured products
- Securities trading and currencies
- Custodian services

=== Wealth management ===
- Financial Planning
- Corporate Finance
- Lending Activities
- BSI Art Advisory

== Initiatives and Events ==
BSI promotes and hosts events such as research, foundations, conferences, personal and collective exhibitions, publications, expositions of art and exclusive collections, concerts, and a number of other endeavours. The bank maintains a commitment to art, music, and culture.

== BSI Art Foundation ==
The BSI Art Foundation promotes the arts and culture in all of their forms. It organises events, exhibitions, and displays in collaboration with other institutions, associations of individual artists, and world-class national museums. It publishes brochures, books, and catalogues about art and artistic endeavours. The Foundation grants scholarships to talented young artists. For established artists, it sets up funds and contributes to developing the artists' potential.

== BSI Gamma Foundation ==
Established on the 125th anniversary of BSI, the BSI Gamma Foundation promotes research in the area of asset management and cooperation between the world of research and practical applications, assigns research mandates to people or institutions with recognized experience in the sector, organises conferences, and publishes the research results.

== Centenario Foundation ==
The Centenario Foundation began in 1973 on the occasion of BSI's first one hundred years. Its scope is to bestow monetary recognition to persons or institutions that have furthered the development of Italian-Swiss relations, contributed to the betterment of understanding between the Swiss and Italian people, or expanded the common cultural heritage.

== BSI Architectural Foundation ==
The BSI Architectural Foundation promotes understanding, education, and research within the field of architecture, in particular by presenting a biennial architectural award, the BSI Architectural Award, the purpose of which is to recognize and bring to public and media attention architects who have made an important contribution to contemporary architecture and who have shown particular sensitivity to the landscape and environment.

== Controversy ==
In 2015, BSI was one of the first banks that paid a penalty of US$211mio to the US government under a non-prosecution agreement for over 3500 declared and undeclared accounts of US Citizens that were opened and operational within BSI Bank.

In 2016, the Financial Times obtained numerous files from BSI that confirmed that an insider had warned the Financial supervisory bodies that the bankers in its UK offices were offering services that could facilitate tax evasion and money laundering. As confirmed by the same article, "the regulators deemed that the bank had done nothing wrong".

In 2017, Regulators in Europe and Asia investigated and punished BSI for its involvement in 1Malaysia Development Berhad scandal. Singapore regulator ordered the branch in Singapore to close down its operation, whilst the Swiss regulator launched a criminal probe against some of the BSI's bankers in Singapore.
