= Vescovi =

Vescovi may refer to:

People

- Ana Paula Vescovi (born 1969), Brazilian economist
- Giovanni Vescovi (born 1978), Brazilian chess player
- Joe Vescovi (1949–2014), Italian keyboardist
- Santiago Véscovi (born 2001), Uruguayan basketball player

Geography

- Punta Tre Vescovi, mountain in Italy
- Rocca dei Tre Vescovi, mountain bordering France and Italy
