= Alexandre Tombini =

Brazilian economist

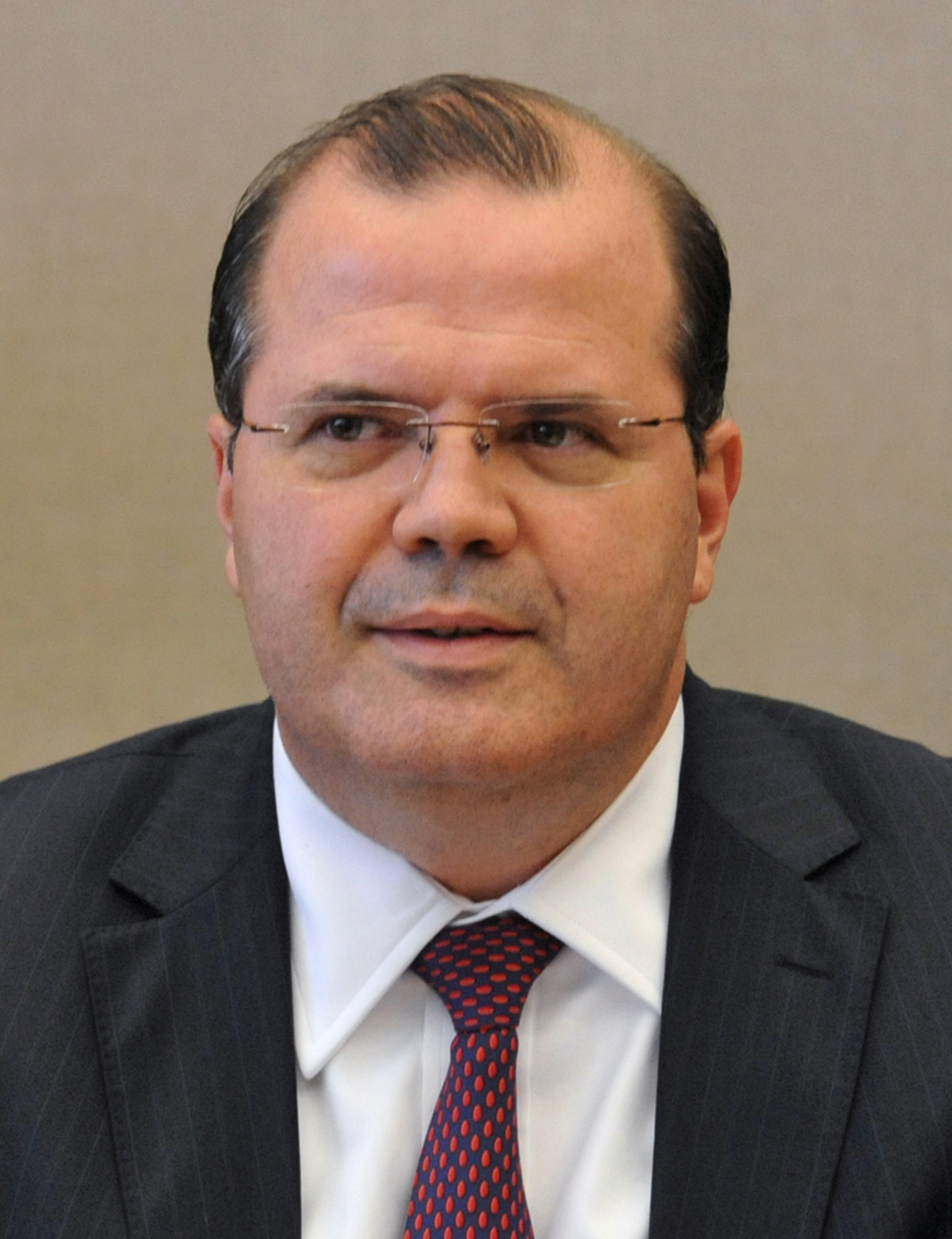

President of the Central Bank
- In office January 1, 2011 – June 9, 2016
- President: Dilma Rousseff
- Preceded by: Henrique Meirelles
- Succeeded by: Ilan Goldfajn

Personal details
- Born: December 9, 1963 (age 62) Porto Alegre, Rio Grande do Sul, Brazil
- Education: University of Brasília, B.Sc. (1984); University of Illinois, Urbana-Champaign, Ph.D. (1991)
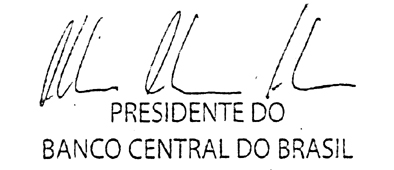
- Signature

Alexandre Antônio Tombini (born December 9, 1963) is a Brazilian economist. He was President of the Central Bank of Brazil until June 9, 2016, when he was replaced by Ilan Goldfajn. Since September 2019 he is Chief Representative for the Americas, based in Mexico City, of the Bank for International Settlements (BIS).

== Academic life ==
Tombini graduated in Economics from the University of Brasília (1984), and has a Ph.D. in Economics from the University of Illinois, Urbana-Champaign (1991).

== Career ==
Tombini made a career in the federal public sector. He worked in the Ministry of Finance between 1991 and 1995, where he headed the technical team negotiating the Common External Tariff (CET) of Mercosur. Between 1995 and 1998, he was special advisor to the Board of Foreign Trade, Chief of Staff of the Presidency of the Republic. He was credited for his role in devising a strategy to reduce inflation in 1999. He is an official of the Central Bank since 1998, where he was Director of International Affairs (2006) and Director of Special Studies (2006). Between 2001 and 2005, he worked in the office of the Brazilian representation in the International Monetary Fund. He was also Senior Advisor to the executive director and Member of the executive board of Directors, Brazilian Representative Office, International Monetary Fund (IMF), Washington, D.C., USA, from July 2001 to May 2005; Head of the Research Department, Central Bank of Brazil, Brasília, Federal District, Brazil, from March 1999 to June 2001; Senior Advisor to the Board, Central Bank of Brazil, Brasília, Federal District, Brazil, from May 1998 to March 1999; Special advisor to the Foreign Trade Chamber, Presidential Staff Office, Presidency of the Republic, Brasília, Federal District, Brazil, from February 1995 to May 1998; General Coordinator of Foreign Affairs, Secretariat of Economic Policy, Ministry of Finance, Brasília, Federal District, Brazil, from December 1992 to January 1995; Visiting professor, Department of Economics, University of Brasília, Brasília, Federal District, Brazil. from March 1993 to December 1994; and Coordinator of International Analysis, Department of International Affairs, Secretariat of Planning, Ministry of Economics, Finance and Planning, Brasília, Federal District, Brazil, from September 1991 to December 1992. He was in charge of operating the Global Econometric Model (GEM) developed by the London Business School, Head of the technical group in charge of negotiating the Mercosul Common External Tariff (TEC) and Editor of Boletim de Economia Internacional, the International Economics Bulletin, published quarterly by the Ministry. Mr. Tombini holds a Ph.D. in economics, University of Illinois, Urbana Champaign, USA, August 1991 and Bachelor in Economics, University of Brasília, December 1984. He was also a Visiting Professor at the University of Brasília (UNB).

On November 24, 2010, Tombini was chosen by President Dilma Rousseff for the post of president of the Central Bank by his government, from 2011, replacing Henrique Meirelles and as a means of continuing the economic policy of the Lula government. In his first address, he said he would have full operational autonomy and that his goal is inflation control, which shall not exceed the target of 4.5 percent per year. He also said that the Central Bank's mission will be to ensure the purchasing power of the Brazilian real. He began his term in office by cutting interest rates from 12.5% to 7.5% however, his term coincided with economic decline in Brazil.

Government offices
Preceded by Henrique Meirelles	President of the Central Bank of Brazil; 2011–2016	Succeeded by Ilan Goldfajn
