= Boleto =

Brazilian payment method

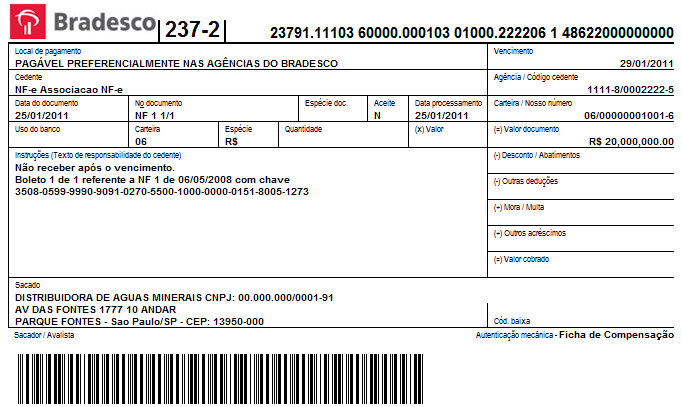

Boleto bancário, simply referred to as boleto (English: bank ticket) is a payment method in Brazil regulated by Febraban (Brazilian Banks Federation).

A boleto, which can be considered a proforma invoice, can be paid at ATMs, branch facilities, and internet banking of any bank, post office, lottery agent and some supermarkets until its due date. After the due date it can only be paid at the issuer bank facilities. A boleto can only be collected by an authorized collector agent in the Brazilian territory.

Open source projects like BoletoPHP allow the merchandisers to generate unregistered boletos bancários without communicating with a bank.

Initially, boletos could only be paid at bank branches, but nowadays it is possible to pay them through ATMs, lottery shops, supermarkets, or with the help of a computer or smartphone via internet banking. Some boletos may contain instructions from the issuer that allow payment even after the set due date, with possible penalty or interest charges for late payment, but these conditions are specific to each issued boleto.

== See also ==
- Brazilian Central Bank
- Giro (banking)
- Pix (electronic payment system)
