= Cezar Peluso =

Brazilian jurist

His Excellency Cezar Peluso
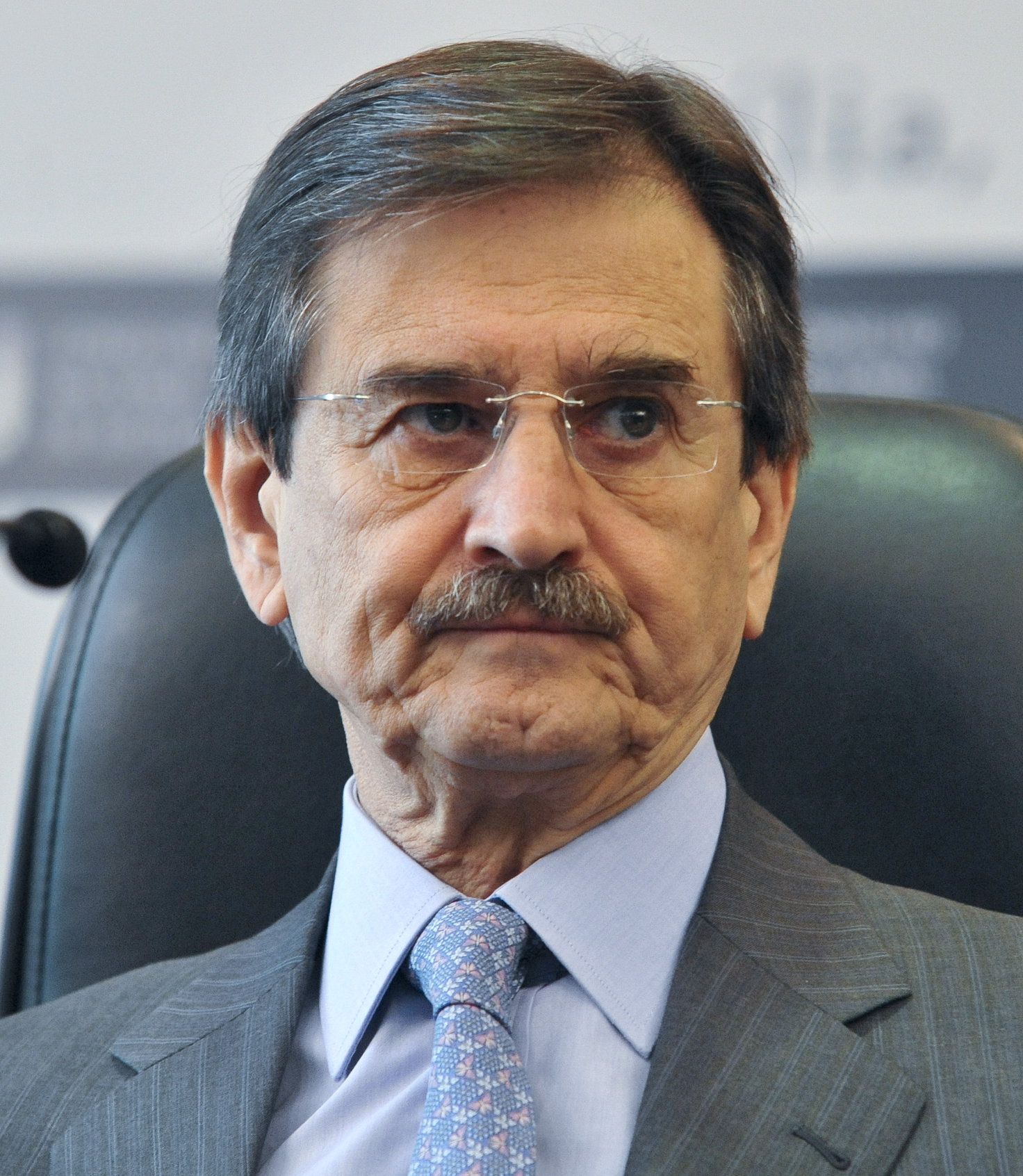

Justice of the Supreme Federal Court
- In office 25 June 2003 – 3 September 2012
- Appointed by: Luiz Inácio Lula da Silva
- Preceded by: Sydney Sanches
- Succeeded by: Teori Zavascki

54th President of the Supreme Federal Court
- In office 23 April 2010 – 18 April 2012
- Vice President: Ayres Britto
- Preceded by: Gilmar Mendes
- Succeeded by: Ayres Britto

Personal details
- Born: 3 September 1942 (age 84) Bragança Paulista, São Paulo, Brazil
- Education: University of São Paulo; Catholic University of Santos
- Other judicial positions: 2010–2012: President, National Justice Council; 2008–2010: Vice President, Supreme Federal Court; 2008–2010: Vice President, National Justice Council; 2006–2008: Vice President, Superior Electoral Court; 2006–2008: Effective Justice, Superior Electoral Court; 2003–2005: Substitute Justice, Superior Electoral Court

Antonio Cezar Peluso (born 3 September 1942) is a Brazilian jurist and professor. He was a member of the Supreme Federal Court (in Portuguese: Supremo Tribunal Federal (STF)) and has been the Court's Chief Justice from April 2010 to April 2012 (in Portuguese: Presidente do Supremo Tribunal Federal).

Peluzo was born in Bragança Paulista, São Paulo. At the time of his retirement, he was one of the two members of the Court with a prior career as a judge (beside Luiz Fux). He is known for his collected demeanor and his ample juridical knowledge, even among Brazil's most important jurists. When Peluso became the President of the STF, analysts such as journalist Elio Gaspari pointed out that his reserved style is a contrast to that of Gilmar Mendes, Peluso's predecessor, who is regarded as a more outspoken figure. However, both judges often agree on juridical decisions; they generally stand on the Court's conservative and textualist wing. On December 16, 2010, he stated that the Supreme Court of Brazil would not review the Amnesty Law on the part which grants immunity to prosecution for former torturers of the oppressive military regime that, after the 1964 coup, installed a 20-year-long dictatorship in Brazil. He taught at the Pontifical Catholic University of São Paulo.

As the Chief Justice of the Supreme Federal Tribunal, Peluso also headed the National Justice Council.

He experienced his mandatory retirement on September 3, 2012.

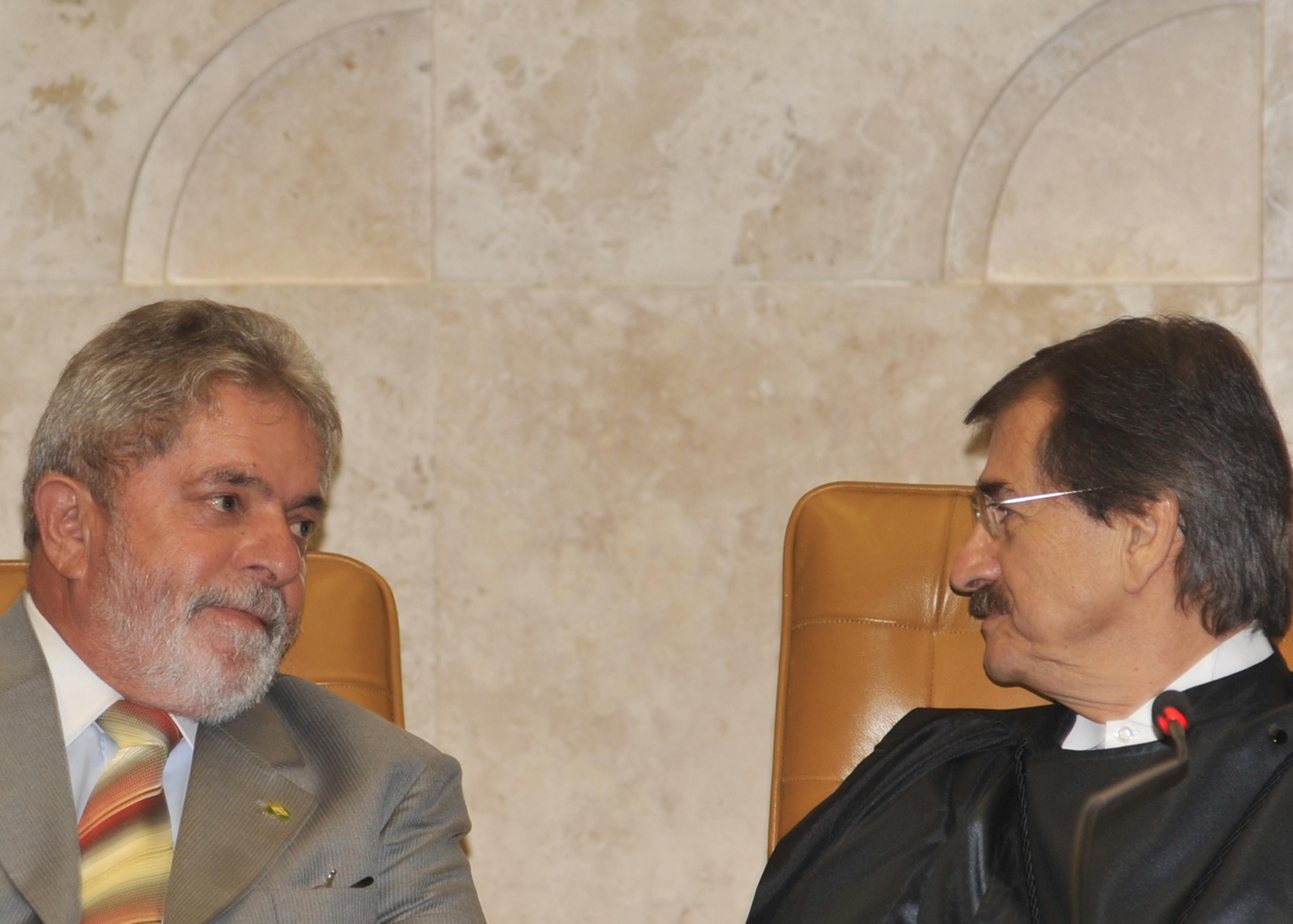
Peluso with President Lula da Silva, who appointed him to the Supreme Federal Court in 2003.

Legal offices
Preceded by Sydney Sanches	Justice of the Supreme Federal Court; 2003–2012	Succeeded by Teori Zavascki
