= Eduardo Guardia =

Brazilian economist (1966–2022)

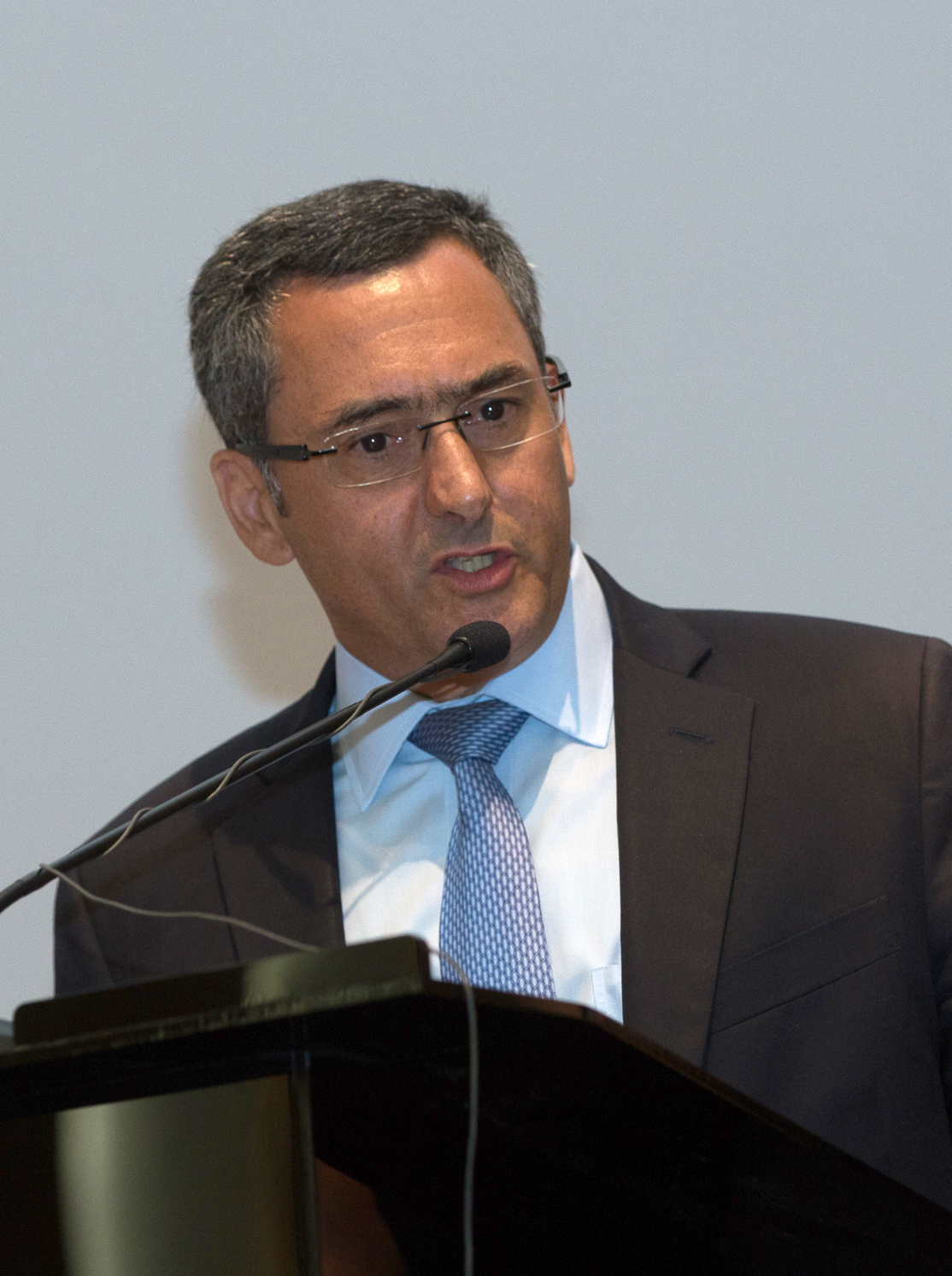
- Guardia in 2019

Minister of Finance
- In office 6 April 2018 – 1 January 2019
- President: Michel Temer
- Preceded by: Henrique Meirelles
- Succeeded by: Paulo Guedes

Executive Secretary of the Ministry of Finance
- In office 3 June 2016 – 6 April 2018
- President: Michel Temer
- Minister: Henrique Meirelles
- Preceded by: Tarcísio Godoy
- Succeeded by: Ana Paula Vescovi

Secretary of the National Treasury
- In office 12 May 2002 – 15 December 2002
- President: Fernando Henrique Cardoso
- Minister: Pedro Malan
- Preceded by: Fabio de Oliveira Barbosa
- Succeeded by: Joaquim Levy

Personal details
- Born: Eduardo Refinetti Guardia; 19 January 1966 São Paulo, Brazil
- Died: 11 April 2022 (aged 56) São Paulo, Brazil
- Education: University of São Paulo
- Occupation: Partner and CEO of BTG Pactual Asset Management
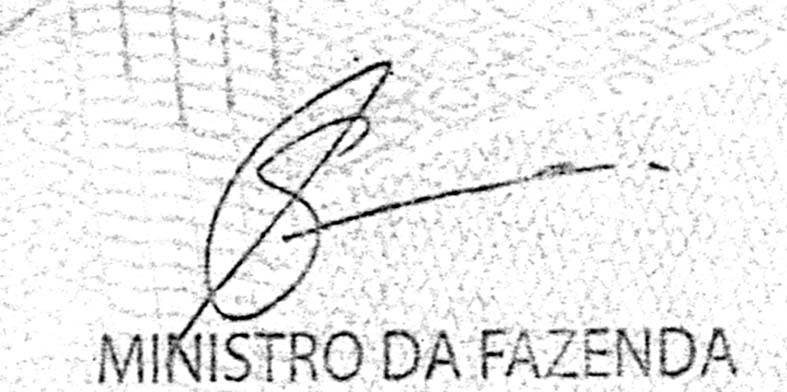
- Signature

Eduardo Refinetti Guardia (19 January 1966 – 11 April 2022) was a Brazilian economist who served as Finance Minister of Brazil from 2018 to 2019. He was previously Executive Secretary of the Ministry of Finance from 2016 and 2018 and Secretary of the National Treasury in the early 2000s. In addition to his political career, between 2010 and 2016, he directed BM&FBOVESPA (currently B3). After leaving the finance ministry, he became a partner in and the CEO of BTG Pactual Asset management.

== Career ==
Guardia held a PhD in Economics from the Institute of Economic Research of the Faculty of Economics, Administration and Accounting at the University of São Paulo (FIPE / USP). He started his career as a teacher, working in the Economics Department of the Faculty of Economics, Administration, Accounting and Actuaries of the Pontifical Catholic University of São Paulo (PUC-SP).

Between the 1990s and 2000s, he was Secretary of Finance of the Government of the State of São Paulo. He also served as head of the Economic Advisory to the Deputy Secretary of the Secretariat of Finance, Advisor to the Secretary of Planning and Researcher of the Fiscal Area of the Public Sector Economics Institute of the Foundation for Administrative Development (IESP / FUNDAP) of São Paulo.

In early 2002, he was appointed assistant secretary of the National Treasury and, in May of that year, he was appointed secretary of the same body. At the same time, he served as Assistant Secretary for Economic Policy at the Ministry of Finance, Assistant Secretary for the Secretariat for Economic Policy and Advisor to the Minister of Planning.

He was executive director of B3 Products, between 2010 and 2016, when he was appointed to take up a post at the Ministry of Finance. In June 2016, Henrique Meirelles, then Finance Minister, appointed Eduardo Guardia to the post of Executive Secretary for Finance. In the same period, he was elected Chairman of Banco do Brasil, where he stayed until April 2017.

The economist is known in the political world for his rigidity in terms of expenditure control and fiscal adjustment policies. This led him to be recognized for his technical profile and for his serious conduct. Throughout his experience in the federal government, Eduardo Guardia became known for austerity and, during the Michel Temer government, the nickname "Mr. No", for acting in favor of reducing expenses to enable future reforms.

== Ministry of Finance ==
In April 2018, with the departure of Henrique Meirelles from the post of Finance Minister to run for president of Brazil, Guardia was appointed his replacement. Eduardo Guardia as new Finance Minister had the challenge of commanding the portfolio in an adverse economic scenario, due to the economic crisis of 2014, in which the Brazilian economy was still recovering from a fiscal restriction situation, due to the spending ceiling.

== BTG Pactual ==
In February 2019, BTG Pactual bank announced that former Finance Minister Eduardo Guardia would become a partner and chief executive of BTG Pactual Asset Management. Guardia was appointed and took office in July of the same year.

Roberto Sallouti, CEO of BTG Pactual, said Eduardo Guardia has a very successful trajectory in the public and private sectors and recognized leadership with unique experience in areas such as economics, investments and management.

== Death ==
On 11 April 2022, it was announced that Guardia had died at the age of 56. No details were immediately provided.

Political offices
| Preceded by Henrique Meirelles | Minister of Finance; 2018–2019 | Succeeded by Paulo Guedes as Minister of the Economy |
