= Paulo Guedes =

Brazilian economist and investment banker

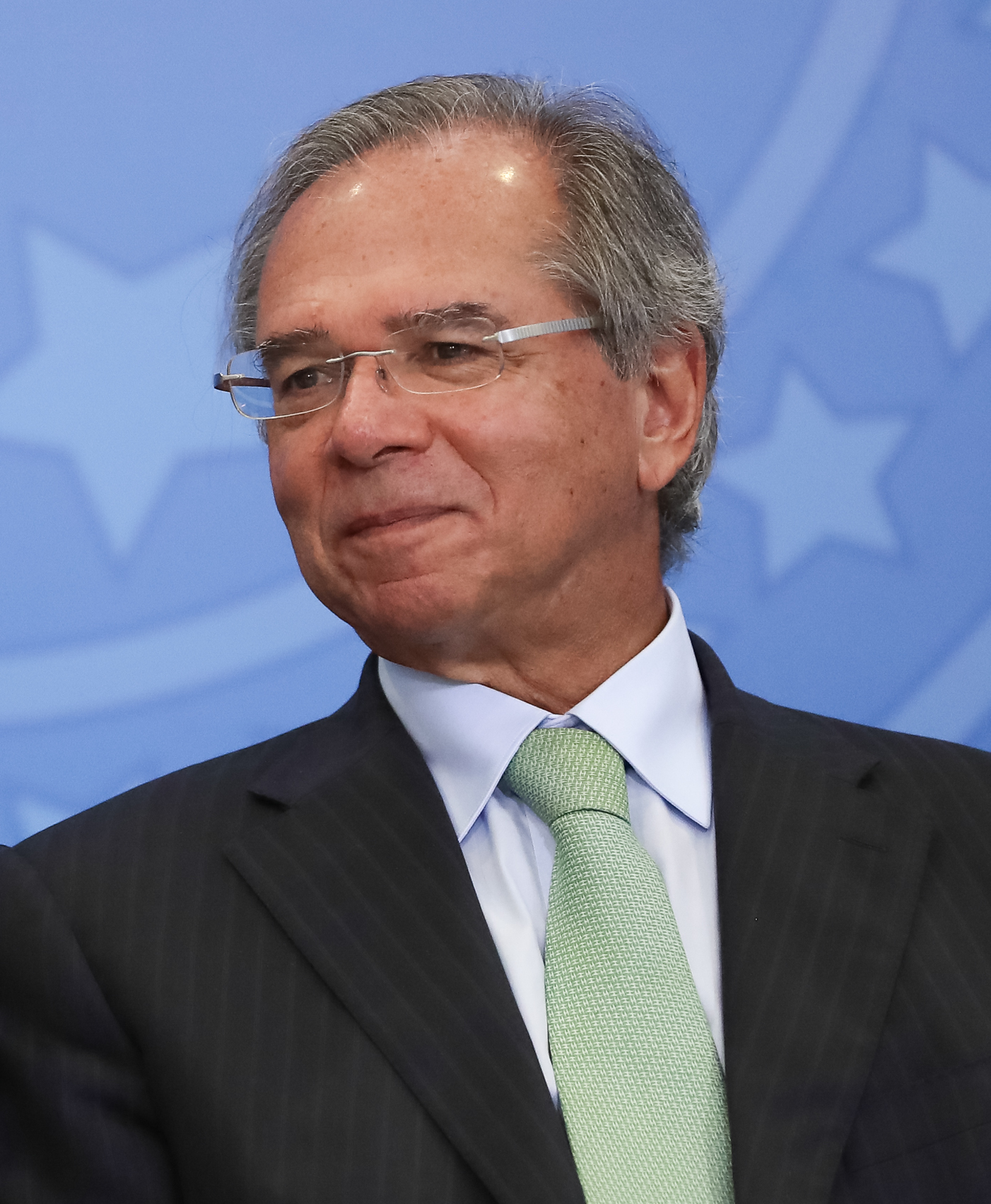
- Guedes in 2020

Minister of the Economy
- In office 1 January 2019 – 1 January 2023
- President: Jair Bolsonaro
- Preceded by: Eduardo Guardia
- Succeeded by: Fernando Haddad

Personal details
- Born: Paulo Roberto Nunes Guedes; 24 August 1949 (age 77) Rio de Janeiro, Federal District, Brazil
- Education: Federal University of Minas Gerais; Getulio Vargas Foundation (MA); University of Chicago (MS, PhD)
- Occupation: Economist
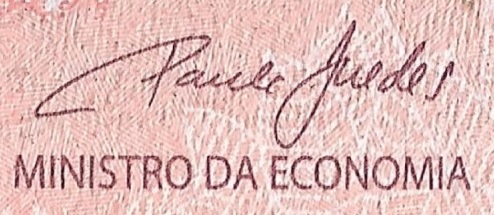
- Signature

Paulo Roberto Nunes Guedes (Note: Portuguese pronunciation: [ˈpaw.lu ʁoˈbɛʁ.tu ˈnũ.niz ˈɡe.d͡ʒis]) (born 24 August 1949) is a Brazilian economist and co-founder of the investment bank BTG Pactual. He is also a co-founder of the think-tank Instituto Millenium, and was the economic advisor for the campaign of President Jair Bolsonaro. Guedes served as the Minister of the Economy of Brazil through the entirety of the Bolsonaro presidency, from 1 January 2019 to 1 January 2023.

== Biography ==
Born in Rio de Janeiro, Guedes attended the Federal University of Minas Gerais as an undergraduate, and later received a master's degree in economics from the Getúlio Vargas Foundation. In 1974 Guedes moved with his wife to the United States to attend the University of Chicago. Then an advocate of Keynesian economics influenced by Paul Samuelson and Franco Modigliani, Guedes adhered to liberalism while attending the University of Chicago, where he was taught by Milton Friedman. His areas of academic focus included macroeconomics, international commerce and econometrics. Guedes received his Ph.D. in 1978.

In 1983 Guedes was one of the co-founders of Banco Pactual, now BTG Pactual, alongside André Jacurski and Luiz Cezar Fernandes. During the 1980s he was a professor of graduate economics at the Pontifical Catholic University of Rio de Janeiro, the Getúlio Vargas Foundation and the National Institute for Pure and Applied Mathematics. During the military dictatorship of Chile, Guedes was a professor at the University of Chile. He is a co-founder of the liberal think-tank Millenium Institute. From 1983 to 1999 Guedes was executive director of Ibmec. Guedes was also a columnist for O Globo, Folha de São Paulo and Exame. Guedes published a piece for the Globo newspaper in 2017 praising Operation Car Wash and the judiciary's efforts to curb corruption and impunity. Guedes was partner and president at Bozano Investimentos until December 2018.

On October 2, 2018, the Federal Public Ministry (MPF) decides to probe Guedes on an accusation of fraud relative to the management of investment funds that were managed by him. Since 2009, those funds have received contributions amounting to one billion Brazilian Reals (BRL) from pension funds belonging to the Brazilian state including from funds of Previ, Banco do Brasil, Petros, Petrobras, Funcef, Caixa and Postalis (Brazilian Posts), that are being probed by several Federal Police task forces, including in the frame of Operation Greenfield, which activities focus on the investments in the Fundos de Investimentos nas Participações (FIP). After having receiving funds from the BR Educational Fund, managed by Guedes, those were reinvested in a sole company, HSM Educacional S/A, that is also managed by Guedes. With the moneys HSM Educational bought 100% of another company, also managed by Guedes: HSM do Brasil S/A. The goodwill (acquisition gap corresponding to the excess over the real value of the company paid to buy it) amounted to 16,5 million Brazilian Reals. After the buyout, HSM do Brasil S/A started having recurring losses. According to the Public Prosecutor Office, the state owned pension funds that were mobilized by the Investment Funds managed by Guedes have lost 200 Million Dollars.

Guedes has denied wrongdoing and said the investigation is politically motivated and "meant to confuse voters". In December 2018 the Federal Police accepted the MPF's request to open an investigation into Guedes's practices regarding pension funds.

In October 2021, his name is mentioned in the Pandora Papers.

=== Politics ===
Guedes has never been affiliated with a political party, but in 1989 was responsible for the economic proposals of the campaign of liberal (classic liberal / libertarian) candidate Guilherme Afif Domingos for the presidency.

In 2018 Guedes was named as the economic advisor for the campaign of Jair Bolsonaro in the 2018 presidential election. Guedes is the candidate's likely pick for Minister of the Economy in a future cabinet. As Bolsonaro's economic spokesperson, Guedes has advocated for the privatization of several state-owned companies, and has defended some of the reforms of President Michel Temer, such as limits to public spending and higher interest rates for loans from BNDES. Guedes supports a single, value-added federal tax instead of Brazil's current tax system. He also advocates for an income tax exemption of R$5,030, which is roughly five times the minimum wage in Brazil (as of 2019, the minimum wage in Brazil is R$998/month).

Guedes was confirmed as Bolsonaro's pick to head the Ministry of the Economy. Guedes's ministry encompasses treasury, planning, budgeting, industry, and commerce.

== See also ==
- Chicago school of economics
- Chicago Boys

== Notes ==
Political offices
Preceded by Eduardo Guardia as Minister of Finance	Minister of the Economy; 2019–2023	Succeeded by Fernando Haddad as Minister of Finance
