= BTG Pactual =

Global financial services company

Banco BTG Pactual S.A.
- Type: Partnership
- Traded as: B3: BPAC11, BPAC3, BPAC5; NYSE: BBTG11; Euronext: BTGP
- Industry: Financial services
- Founded: 1983 in Rio de Janeiro by André Jacurski, Luiz Cezar Fernandes and Paulo Guedes
- Headquarters: São Paulo, Brazil
- Area served: Worldwide
- Key people: André Esteves (Chairman), Roberto Sallouti (CEO), Nelson Jobim (Partner), Guilherme Paes (Partner), Steve Jacobs (Partner), Mansueto Almeida (Partner)
- Services: Asset management Banking; Corporate lending Credit card Global markets Investment banking Sales and trading Private equity Timberland investment Wealth management
- Revenue: ▲US$ 6.3 billion (2025)
- Net income: ▲US$ 3.0 billion (2025)
- Total assets: ▲US$ 162.8 billion (2025)
- Number of employees: 8,188 (2024)
- Website: www.btgpactual.com

BTG Pactual (pronounced [pak.tuˈaw]) is a global financial services group headquartered in São Paulo, Brazil. Founded in Rio de Janeiro in 1983, it has regional bank operations in 13 major financial centers and operations across the Americas, Europe, the Middle East, and Asia. With over US$500 billion in assets across wealth and asset management, BTG Pactual offers services in investment banking, wealth management, asset management, corporate lending, sales and trading, and consumer banking. Its shares are traded on the B3 in São Paulo.

During the 2020s, BTG Pactual expanded its international presence across the Americas and Europe, while developing a presence in the Middle East and Asia. In the same period, the firm diversified its business activities by expanding in areas including digital and consumer banking. In the United States, BTG Pactual operates through several businesses, including investment banking, brokerage, asset management, wealth management, banking, and private equity and alternative investment strategies. Following the acquisition of M.Y. Safra Bank, BTG Pactual Bank, N.A. expanded the group's ability to accept deposits and provide credit directly in the US market. Its US alternative investment activities include BTG Pactual Global Alternatives and Strategic Capital, which invests in private equity, credit, and structured capital opportunities.

BTG Pactual is controlled by André Esteves, Roberto Sallouti, Nelson Jobim, John Huw Gwili Jenkins, Cláudio Eugênio Stiller Galeazzi, Mark Clifford Maletz, Eduardo Henrique de Mello Motta Loyo and Guilhermo Ortiz Martínez. On April 29, 2022, BTG shareholders confirmed André Esteves as chairman.

In the United States, BTG Pactual operates BTG Pactual Bank, N.A., an FDIC-insured national bank offering consumer checking accounts, money market accounts, and certificates of deposit. The group also offers CNR bank accounts with PIX for non-residents who hold a Brazilian CPF.

== History ==
BTG Pactual began in 1983 in Rio de Janeiro as the brokerage firm Pactual DTVM, when its initial and primary activity was proprietary trading and securities sales and trading. In 1986, the asset management and investment bank areas were created. In 1989, the bank opened its São Paulo's office and started the internationalization of operations. Eleven years after the foundation, the bank started the wealth management activities.

In 1998, the company replaced its executive officers with a team led by André Esteves, Eduardo Plass, Marcelo Serfaty and Gilberto Sayão, and acquired Banco Bamerindus. In 2000, the bank opened Pactual Asset Management S.A. DTVM and an office in Cayman Islands. In 2003, the expansion continued with offices in Belo Horizonte and Recife.

In 2006, the UBS bought Banco Pactual for US$2.5 billion and created UBS Pactual, André Esteves became CEO of all UBS' Latin American operations. Two years later, Esteves left the bank to found BTG (Banking and Trading Group ) Investments with nine other founding partners of UBS and UBS Pactual, including Pérsio Arida, a former president of the Brazilian Central Bank. In 2009, BTG bought out UBS shareholders and created Banco BTG Pactual. The following year the bank issued US$1.8bn in capital, representing 18.65%, to a group of international investors and partners. In 2011, they acquired 51.00% of Banco PanAmericano shares. In 2012, BTG Pactual bought brokerages in Chile and Colombia, Celfin Capital and Bolsa y Renta, and held an initial public offering (IPO) raising R$3.65 billion, making it one of the 20 biggest companies listed on the B3.

In 2013, the bank, through its subsidiary BTG Pactual Timberland Investments Group LLC, acquired forest asset management contracts from Regions Timberland Group, a division of Regions Bank, the acquisition expanding its investment in forest assets. The deal established BTG Pactual as the biggest independent forest asset manager in Latin America and one of the biggest in the world, with assets of US$3bn and a portfolio of 716,000 hectares of land in North America, Latin America, Europe and Africa. In 2014, it made two acquisitions in Europe: British reinsurer Ariel Re bought for an undisclosed amount, and also Swiss bank BSI, for US$1.7 billion.

In 2017, BTG Pactual bought shares of companies such Anheuser-Busch InBev, Fibria Celulose, Gerdau, Staples and Telefónica Brasil.

=== Recent history and expansion (2020–present) ===
Since 2020, BTG Pactual has significantly expanded its presence in the retail banking and digital investment sectors. In 2020, the bank launched BTG+, a full-service digital retail bank, integrating it with its existing BTG Pactual Digital platform to compete in the fintech and retail markets.

Between 2021 and 2026, the bank executed a series of strategic acquisitions to diversify its revenue streams and internationalize its operations: Retail and Wealth Management; International Expansion; and Financial Performance.

It acquired several Brazilian brokerages and wealth management firms, including Necton Investimentos (2020), Elite Investimentos (2021), and Universa (2021).

In 2021, Esteves and Sallouti, the bank's chairman and CEO, respectively, founded the Institute of Technology and Leadership (Instituto de Tecnologia e Liderança) with institutional support from BTG Pactual, to offer higher education to students in the Technology area, with an emphasis on Computing, Business, and Leadership.

In 2024, BTG Pactual expanded its US wealth management operations by acquiring Greytown Advisors, a Miami-based multi-family office with approximately US$1 billion in assets under management. In December 2025, the Federal Reserve Board approved BTG Pactual's acquisition of M.Y. Safra Bank, FSB, in New York. The acquisition was completed at the end of 2025, and the institution was converted into a national bank and renamed BTG Pactual Bank, N.A. The transaction enabled the group to accept deposits and extend credit directly in the United States. It also acquired the wealth management operations of Julius Baer in several Latin American markets.

Following the acquisition, BTG Pactual continued expanding its US banking operations. The group had more than 280 employees in the country, with offices in New York and Miami, and was increasing its headcount to support the growth of its wealth management and international banking businesses. The group also continued expanding its US team in 2026. In 2026, the bank's Timberland Investment Group (TIG) announced the acquisition of over 107,000 acres of timberlands in Virginia, USA, further establishing its position as one of the world's largest independent forest asset managers.

== Structure ==
BTG Pactual was formed by Banco BTG Pactual and BTG Pactual Participations. The latter is the managing partner and controller of BTG Investments. Banco BTG Pactual is the main operating company of the group.

== Operations ==
BTG Pactual operates primarily as an investment bank, wealth manager, and asset manager. Its core activities include providing advisory services for mergers and acquisitions (M&A), initial public offerings (IPOs), and corporate lending. The bank also engages in sales and trading across various markets, including fixed income, currencies, commodities, and equities. Through its asset management division, BTG Pactual manages investment funds, including public and private equity, and operates a dedicated timberland investment group (TIG) that manages forestry assets globally.

Additionally, the bank's wealth management division provides financial advisory and succession planning services.

In the United States, BTG Pactual operates through several businesses, including investment banking, brokerage, asset management, wealth management and banking. Following the acquisition of M.Y. Safra Bank, BTG Pactual Bank, N.A. expanded the group's ability to accept deposits and provide credit directly in the US market.

== Digital platform and startup initiatives ==
The bank's online investment platform launched in 2014. Its retail clients have access to investment funds, fixed income products (CDB, LCA, LCI and LF), private pension (PGBL and VGBL) and COE - Certificate of Structured Operation, aimed at high-income retail in Brazil.

In 2020, the bank expanded its retail operations by integrating this platform with a new retail banking division, launching a digital banking application called BTG+.

By 2026, the digital platform strategy, led by BTG Pactual partner Marcelo Flora, had developed over a decade through more than R$15 billion in technology investments and around 40 acquisitions. The bank was seeking to replicate the model in other markets.

The bank later expanded its digital strategy internationally. In 2023, BTG Pactual launched a US-based global accounts platform, initially offering access to US-listed stocks, ETFs and real estate funds, and later adding investment funds and fixed-income products. Following the acquisition of M.Y. Safra Bank, the group outlined plans to broaden its US consumer banking offering to include products such as checking and savings accounts, credit cards and mortgage lending.

Additionally, the bank operates a startup support program called boostLAB, which provides mentoring and credit to early-stage companies. The program selects cohorts of startups periodically to participate in its initiatives. The partners and executives of BTG Pactual participate in the program as mentors, as well as a number of entrepreneurs, including from Silicon Valley.

In August 2020, boostLab held the sixth edition of its startup potentiation program at the advanced level, selecting eight startups: Accordo Certo, Atta, Belvo, Conta Simples, iClubs, Ludos Pró (edtech), Provi and Rede Compras.

== Environment ==
BTG Pactual is part of the CDP Brazil - Climate Resilience Index (ICDPR-70), which measures the performance of companies with differentiated practices in climate management, aligned with global trends and recommendations from international agreements. Additionally, the bank received the title of Best Green Financing Initiatives in the emerging market from Global Finance.

== Awards ==
- Best Private Bank in Latin America by PWM, 2020, by Euromoney 2026;
- Best Private Bank in Colombia by PWM, 2020;
- Best Private Bank in Latin America by Global Finance, 2020;
- Best Private Bank in Colombia by Global Finance, 2020;
- Best Private Bank for Digital advisory services Latin America by PWM, 2019 and 2020.
- Best CEO – First Place – Nominated by the Buy Side and Sell Side 2019 by Institutional Investor.
- The best of Dinheiro, category Specialized Banking Brazil, 2019.
- Best Private Bank in Latin America by Global Finance, 2019.
- Best Private Banking in Chile by Global Finance, 2019.
- Best Bank to Invest – Digital Category by FGV and Fractal Consult, 2018 and 2019.
- Pension Guide Valor Econômico/Fundação Getulio Vargas - Nominated by Featured Multimarkets Asset Manager, 2019.
- Best Investment Bank by Euromoney (Awards for Excellence), 2019.
- The World’s Best Investment Bank in the Emerging Markets by Euromoney (Awards for Excellence), 2019.
- Best Investment Bank (in Brazil, Chile and Colombia) by World Finance, 2019.
- Best Private Bak (in Brazil) by World Finance, 2019.
- Investment Bank of the Year Brazil, Investment Bank of the Year Latam and Wealth Management Bank of the Year by LatinFinance, 2019;
- ECM Leader (Latin America and Brazil) by Dealogic, 2019.
- Best Financial Innovation Centers in the World for BoostLab by Global Finance, 2019.
- Highly Commended at Best Private Bank in Brazil category by the Global Private Banking Awards 2016
- Best Private Bank in Colombia by the Global Private Banking Awards 2016
- Best Private Bank in Colombia by the Global Private Banking Awards 2017
- Best Equities Sales bank in Brazil at the 2017 Institutional Investor ranking
- Elect Best Global Macro Fund by the 2018 Investors Choice Awards
- Elect the Best Investment bank in Brazil, Chile and Colombia by the 2018 World Finance Banking Awards

== Controversies ==
=== Insider trading ===
This case was closed and there was no impact to the public offering. In 2012, penalties for André Esteves' insider trading "force[d] the bank to amend its prospectus, give investors the option to reconsidering bids for BTG shares, and put a cloud over one of this year's highest-profile bank deals."The bank stated at the time that the allegations lacked merit and that Esteves intended to appeal, though he later opted not to pursue the appeal citing time and cost considerations.

=== Acquisition and resale of Pactual ===
The 2006 sale of Banco Pactual to UBS for US$3.1 billion and its subsequent resale to BTG in 2009 for US$2.5 billion has been a subject of scrutiny by financial commentators. Critics noted the roles of André Esteves and Huw Jenkins in both institutions during these transitions. Jenkins, who left UBS in 2007, later joined BTG Pactual as a senior partner and board member in 2010.

=== BTG Pactual purchase of BSI ===
Following the 2014 acquisition of the Swiss bank BSI, BTG Pactual faced regulatory challenges related to BSI's previous dealings with the Malaysian sovereign wealth fund 1MDB.^{[72]} BTG Pactual subsequently sold BSI to EFG International in 2016.
