= André Esteves =

Brazilian businessman

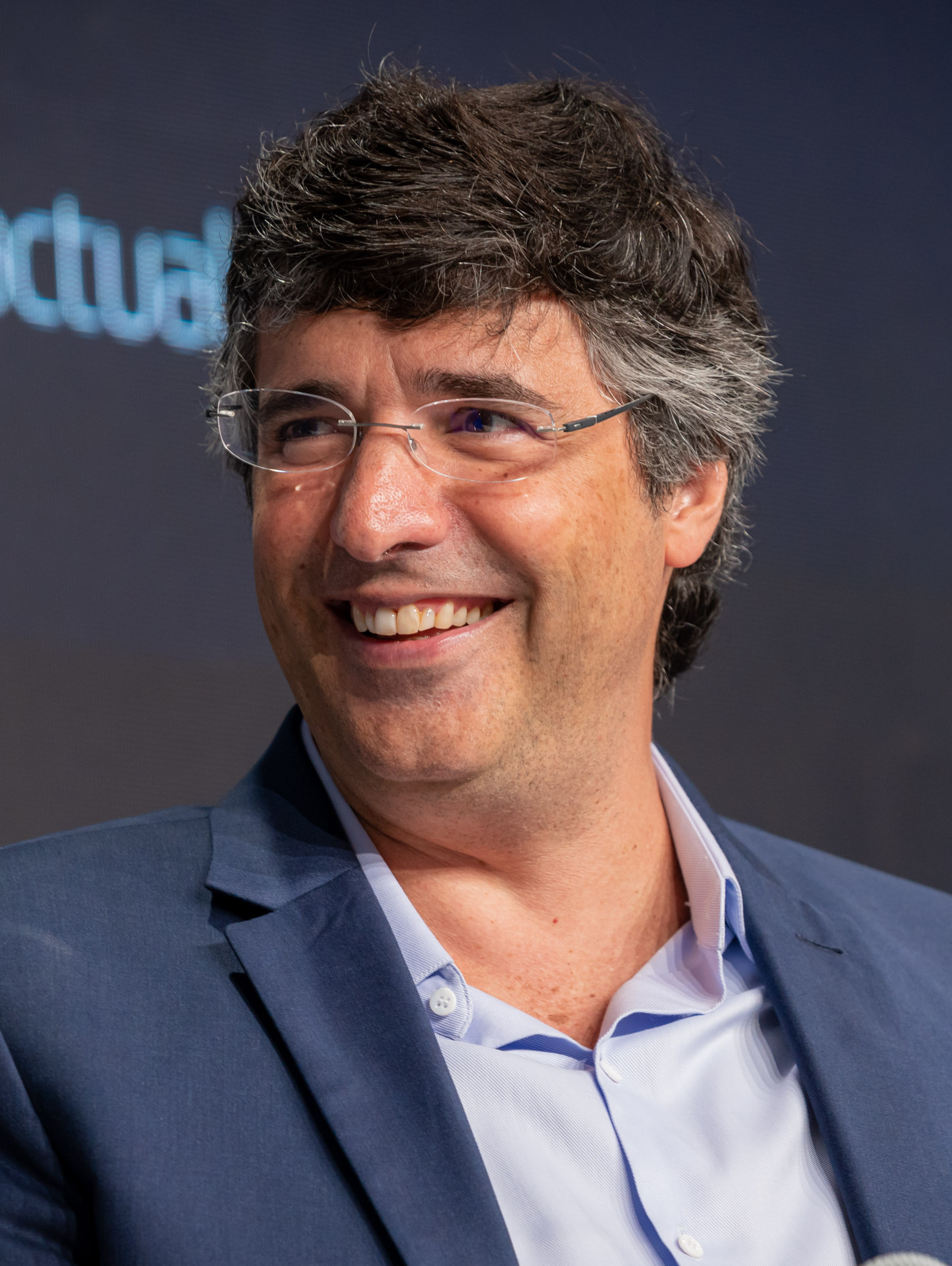
- Esteves in 2024
- Born: André Santos Esteves; July 12, 1968 (age 58); Rio de Janeiro, Brazil
- Education: Federal University of Rio de Janeiro
- Occupations: Businessman, investor, philanthropist, tycoon
- Title: Chairman and Senior Partner, BTG Pactual
- Board member of: Conservation International; Inteli; Council on Foreign Relations
- Spouse: Lillian Esteves
- Children: 3

André Santos Esteves (born July 12, 1968) is a Brazilian billionaire businessman and tycoon. Among Brazilian billionaires, Esteves is ranked fourth with a net worth of US$20.2 billion, according to Forbes, as of June 2026. He is senior partner and chairman at BTG Pactual, the biggest investment bank in Latin America. Under his leadership, the firm has expanded its operations across investment banking, asset management, and, in the 2020s, commodities trading and international markets.

In 2015, Esteves was accused of obstructing justice. In July 2018, he was acquitted by the Federal Court. In April 2022, he was reappointed chairman of BTG Pactual. He is a board member of Conservation International, Inteli and Council on Foreign Relations.

== Personal life ==
André Esteves was born into a middle-class family in Rio de Janeiro, and obtained his bachelor's degree in computer science from the Federal University of Rio de Janeiro. Esteves has three children, and The New York Times writes that "he has driven the same Mercedes pickup for four years and takes only two weeks of vacation a year". When interviewed about his downtime, "Esteves professes a love of his job, though he also enjoys cinema, wine and good food."

Esteves is involved in the wine industry. In 2012, he acquired the Italian winery Argiano, located in Montalcino, Tuscany, and in 2013 acquired Quinta da Romaneira in Portugal's Douro Valley. Under his ownership, Argiano adopted organic farming practices and sustainability initiatives, including the elimination of single-use plastics by 2019. In 2023, the Argiano Brunello di Montalcino 2018 was named “Wine of the Year” by ''Wine Spectator''.

== Career ==
=== Early career and Banco Pactual ===
As a systems analyst while attending the Federal University of Rio de Janeiro, André Esteves joined Pactual in 1989 and within "a year he was a member of the bank's foreign debt trading team, and within two he was managing IPOs and M&A deals." In 1992, Esteves made a partner for helping the bank "to post a 59 percent return on capital".

=== UBS Pactual and international experience ===
UBS purchased Pactual in December 2006, and became UBS Pactual. Esteves led the Latin American operations and later moved to London, where he served as global head of fixed income, currencies, and commodities.

=== Formation of BTG Pactual ===
June 2008, Esteves left UBS Pactual along with key Brazilian partners to create BTG, a global investment company. In April 2009, they purchased Pactual back from UBS for US$2.5 billion. He discussed these events an interview for the Creating Emerging Markets project at the Harvard Business School. Esteves arrives at his office as early as 6:30 AM and "often calls partners together for meetings as late as 10:00 p.m." He also holds regular study meetings with BTG Pactual directors at his home.

=== Global expansion ===
According to the ''Financial Times'', the firm expanded its operations beyond traditional investment banking into commodities trading, infrastructure, and international markets. By the mid-2020s, BTG Pactual had assets under management reported in excess of US$300 billion and expanded its presence beyond Latin America through operations in Europe and North America. In September 2023, the bank completed the acquisition of 100% of the share capital of FIS Privatbank in Luxembourg for 21.3 million euros, aiming to expand its wealth management and asset management activities in Europe. In June 2024, it announced the acquisition of M.Y. Safra Bank in the United States, a transaction finalized in January 2026, granting the institution a banking license to operate directly in the North American market as BTG Pactual Bank.

Additionally, in October 2025, BTG Pactual proposed a corporate reorganization to incorporate all remaining shares of Banco Pan, resulting in the cancellation of Banco Pan's public company registration and its conversion into a wholly-owned subsidiary. In interviews cited by financial media, Esteves has emphasized the strategic importance of commodities, particularly agriculture, stating that Brazil could play a central role in meeting future global food demand. Financial media have also reported that BTG Pactual has invested in building a commodities trading platform focused on flows between Latin America and Asia.

== Philanthropy ==
James Crombie of LatinFinance writes that "Esteves supports education and environmental charities". In addition, André Esteves is a member of the Global Board of Advisors of the Council on Foreign Relations. He has also supported initiatives, projects, and institutions that aim to improve education, healthcare, and promote the arts in Brazil. Institutions like the Universidade de São Paulo, the "Hospital de Câncer de Barretos" and the Museu de Arte Moderna de São Paulo are among those supported by Esteves.

In April 2020, Esteves and other partners of BTG Pactual announced a donation of 50 million Brazilian reais for COVID-19 pandemic combat projects in Brazil.

=== Environment ===
Esteves is also known for his pro-environment activities, most of them in private. He is a board member at Conservation International and played an active role supporting the Amazonia Live program, a project to plant one million trees, in partnership with one of the biggest music festivals of the world, Rock in Rio.

He is part of the 5P Alliance, a group of entrepreneurs, bankers, and doctors who are working on their own to ensure the conservation of the Pantanal biome by acquiring farms in the region to preserve them. The goal is to create large ecological corridors and keep the biome as the most preserved in the country. André Esteves is the owner of Fazenda Rio Negro, which in 2001 was granted the title of Private Natural Heritage Reserve (RPPN) by the government of Mato Grosso do Sul for having several endangered species such as the giant otter, the marsh deer, and the hyacinth macaw. The property was also a filming location for the Brazilian TV series Pantanal.

=== Inteli ===
In 2021, he founded the Institute of Technology and Leadership (Inteli) with Roberto Sallouti, with the aim of providing higher education for students in the field of Technology, with emphasis on Computing, Business, and Leadership. Esteves and his family sponsored the initiative with a donation of US$38 million.

=== Esteves Hall ===
André Esteves made a significant personal donation to Harvard Business School, in order to renovate the former Baker Hall, located on the campus of Harvard University; now renamed as Esteves Hall, in honor of him. This Harvard dormitory is used by the School's Executive Education programs, which annually attract some 10,000 executives from around the globe, many from Esteves' home country, Brazil.

== Prizes ==
- Entrepreneur of the Year, by the Trade Association of Rio de Janeiro (ACRJ), in 2023.
- Person of the Year by the Brazilian Chamber of Commerce of UK in 2014.
- Entrepreneur of the Year, by "Isto É Dinheiro" magazine for two years, in 2011 and 2014.
- Person of the Year by the US-Brazil Chamber of Commerce in 2012.
- Appointed leader in Financial by Leaders of Brazil in 2012.
- One of the 50 most influential people in the world by "Bloomberg" in 2012.
- Prominent Executive in the area of banks and financial institutions by Valor Econômico newspaper for three consecutive years, in 2011, 2012 and 2013.
- One of the most admired leaders of the Year by Carta Capital magazine for two consecutive years in 2011 and 2012.
- One of the "100 Most Influential Brazilians " by Epoca magazine for four consecutive years, in 2009, 2010, 2011 and 2012.
- Personality of the Year by Latin Finance in 2010.
- One of the 25 most influential executives in the financial sector, according to Institutional Investor survey in 2009.

== BTG Pactual ==
BTG Pactual, where André Esteves serves as chairman and senior partner, is a Brazilian investment bank and asset management firm. The bank provides services including advisory services in merger transactions and acquisitions, equity, debt underwriting, asset management, wealth management, sales and trading, loans and financing (corporate lending) and fund management for clients including corporations, financial institutions, governments and high-net-worth people.

Approximately 70% of the company is owned by its partners, fostering an alignment of long-term interests with its stakeholders. The bank is also active in proprietary investments (both class of net assets as of non-liquid assets). It is recognized as one of the leading investment banks in emerging markets, the largest independent investment bank and the largest asset manager in Brazil.

== Controversy ==
=== Insider trading ===
In April 2012, André Esteves was fined €350,000 for insider trading in Italy by Consob. They said, that "the 43-year-old Latin American banker bought the shares in November 2007 knowing that the group was planning to enter a joint venture with Brazilian rival JBS." This case was closed and there was no impact to the public offering. In a statement, BTG Pactual said "Esteves believed the allegations had no merit and was determined to appeal the decision."

=== Other legal and business disputes ===
In 2006, Esteves sold Pactual to UBS for 3.1 billion Swiss francs, and later repurchased the firm in 2009 for 2.5 billion Swiss francs after leaving UBS to establish BTG Pactual. Huw Jenkins, who was involved in the 2006 transaction at UBS, later became a senior partner and board member at BTG Pactual in 2010.

Esteves has been involved in civil proceedings filed in Hong Kong by a former employee; the case received limited media coverage and was reportedly resolved privately. Earlier media reports also noted commercial disputes involving corporate investments, such as Sete Participações, and other business dealings in Brazil. These matters were primarily civil or commercial in nature, did not result in convictions, and were settled through legal or private means.

=== Arrest and release ===
On 25 November 2015, Esteves was arrested as part of a scandal investigation into Petrobras and his bank's dealings with the oil company. Three weeks later, on December 17, 2015, Esteves was released from prison. BTG's bonds and shares rose 7.7 percent to 15.62 reais at 3:55 p.m. in São Paulo, after gaining as much as 12 percent. The company's $1 billion of notes due 2020 rose 3.1 cents to 72.15 cents on the dollar. Esteves' attorneys argued that he was only arrested because he's one of the wealthiest people in Brazil, according to court documents filed this month with the supreme court. On 27 April 2016, the bank confirmed in a statement that he would be a senior partner, advising on strategy and the development of activities and operations.

== Full vindication ==
Considered already one of the biggest judicial errors in Brazil, Esteves has been fully vindicated and acquitted of all charges. On June 28, 2017, the Chief Justice of the Brazilian Supreme Court, Gilmar Mendes, referred André Esteves' case during the plenary session of the Supreme Court, "This is a fact of which we are witnesses. I must praise the loyalty that Minister Teori Zavascki also had with this case, when he verified this is a clear case of unequivocal judicial error, about which no one speaks because only success is spoken." Minister Sepúlveda Pertence was arguing and used the following expression: "I am facing a scabrous case of judicial error".

On September 1, 2017, the Federal Prosecution Service says it has not found evidence that Esteves committed the crime of obstruction of justice. "André was improperly involved in this process, the instruction proved this completely," said Antônio Carlos de Almeida Castro, Esteves' lawyer, on the request for acquittal. On July 12, 2018, the Federal Court of Brasilia acquitted Esteves of the accusations of obstruction of justice for confirmation that there was insufficient evidence to corroborate the allegations. Following the acquittal, Esteves' lawyers stated that "In this case, Esteves' initial arrest was completely unnecessary and abusive."
