= Pix (payment system) =

Brazilian instant payment platform

- Developer: Central Bank of Brazil
- Release: Brazil: 5 October 2020; 6 years ago +8 countries: 3 August 2026; 3 months ago
- Available in: Brazilian Portuguese
- Type: E-commerce payment system
- License: Apache License
- Website: www.bcb.gov.br/en/financialstability/pix_en
- Repository: github.com/bacen/pix-api

Pix (Portuguese pronunciation: [ˈpiks]) is an instant payment platform created and managed by the Central Bank of Brazil (BCB). It enables free instant transfers between individuals in Brazilian real 24 hours a day without interruption, even outside banking hours and during holidays or weekends; payments made and received by legal entities may be subject to fees.

Launched in November 2020, Pix was adopted by over 62% of Brazil's population within a year; by 2023, it overtook card transactions. By the first quarter of 2026, monthly Pix transactions reached almost R$3.4 trillion (approximately US$660 billion), a transaction volume equivalent to roughly one-quarter of the annual Brazilian GDP.

Pix is the largest payment method in Brazil, processing 8.6 times more transaction value than credit and debit cards combined. The system has seen widespread adoption, with 200 million monthly active users (80% of the population) comprising 175 million individuals and 25 million institutions.

Pix is considered one of the world's most successful instant payment systems and is credited with promoting financial inclusion, particularly for low-income people and informal workers. The system has been promoted as a model for other countries, and the BCB has signed agreements to share information about Pix with 65 foreign counterparts.

== Etymology ==
Pix is not an acronym. The goal of the Central Bank at the time of its implementation was to associate the system with technology. One suggested name was "Pi" (for "Pagamentos Instantâneos", lit. 'Instant Payments'), and another was "Tix" (for "Transações instantâneas X", lit. 'Instant Transactions'); the chosen solution was to blend the two proposals, which led to the creation of "Pix". The x in the name is meant to represent multiplication or a mathematical variable, symbolizing the "various possible uses" of Pix, such as payments between individuals, businesses, and the government, among others. Some sources also relate the name Pix to the concept of a pixel, which is said to be reflected in the logo design.

== History and usage ==
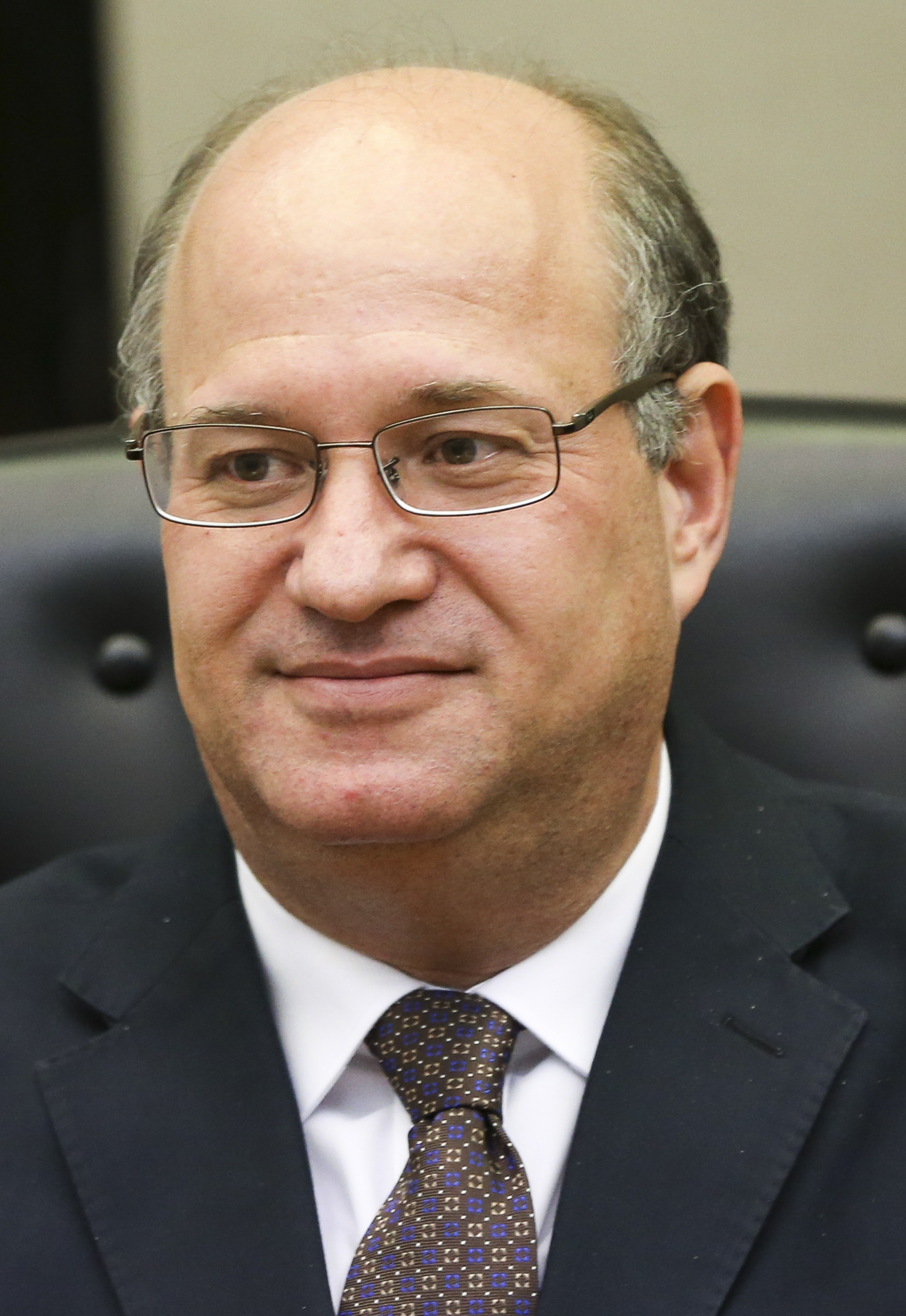
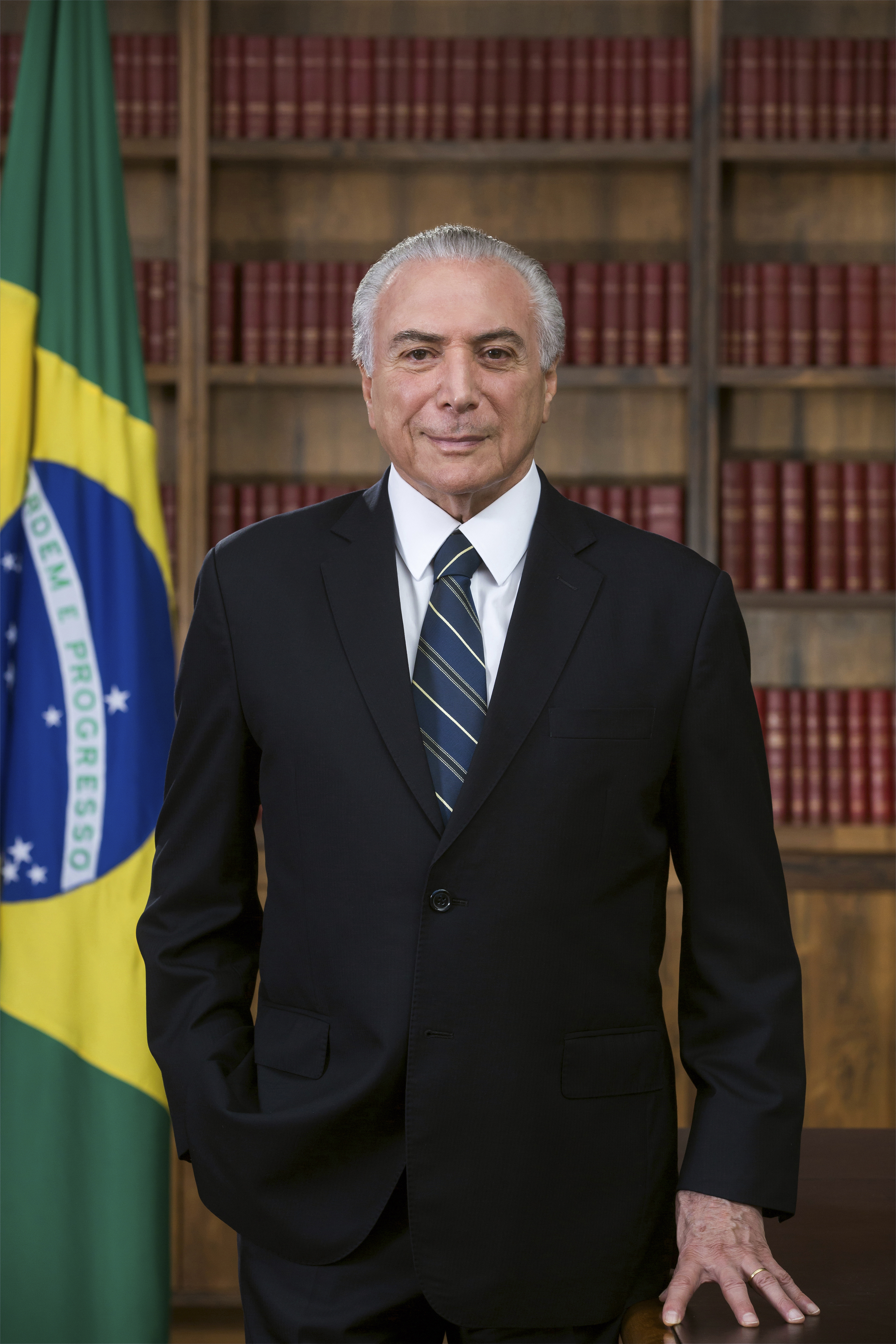
Ilan Goldfajn (left) was the president of the autonomous Central Bank when research began on what would later become Pix, during the administration of Michel Temer (right).

Members of the team responsible for Pix state that the system had already existed "in concept" since 2016; in December of that year, the then-president of the Central Bank, Ilan Goldfajn, signaled that the institution was preparing to launch a tool inspired by Zelle, which had been announced shortly before in the United States. Still that year, Central Bank staff had produced a report titled "Fast payments – Enhancing the speed and availability of retail payments" on the benefits and design of instant payment systems. The Central Bank's technical team concluded that implementing such an instant payment system would be "excellent" policy; the proposal was submitted to the board of directors for review and was eventually approved. In May 2018, during Michel Temer's administration, Goldfajn created an internal working group called "Pagamentos Instantâneos" to develop the basic specifications of what would later become Pix.

The project was carried forward by Roberto Campos Neto during Jair Bolsonaro's administration. The "Pix" brand name and logo were created in-house by the BCB in February 2020. In November 2020, the system was finally launched.

The Central Bank of Brazil launched Pix in part to spur competition in the country's banking industry. Bloomberg referred to the system as "ubiquitous" in Brazil in October 2021, a year after Pix's release. In November 2021, it was reported that the system had already made more than 6 billion transactions, totaling an amount of R$3.75 trillion (about US$682 billion). In 2023, Pix was the main payment system in Brazil, totaling 42 billion transactions.

As of February 2024, Italy was considering a bilateral agreement with Brazil to implement the mechanism.

As of May 2025, Pix had accumulated over 175 million users, of which 160 million were individuals and the remainder were businesses. Pix is credited with the decline in the use of physical banknotes and coins in Brazil; in 2019, 43% of the population used cash, compared to just 6% in 2024, according to a Google survey. Pix is used by 93% of the Brazilian adult population, with 62% using it as their most frequent payment method, and it already accounted for 47% of financial transactions in Brazil by the end of 2024. Its adoption is widespread across all age groups, social classes, and regions. The transaction cost is free for individuals, and 0.33% for businesses and merchants, compared to 1.13% for debit cards and 2.34% for credit cards.

In July 2025, the system was affected by a cyberattack on the software company C&M, which resulted in the theft of more than R$540 million (US$100 million).

In July 2025, Nobel Prize–winning economist Paul Krugman praised Pix and suggested that with it, Brazil may have invented the "future of money" and that the Brazilian payment system is "actually achieving what cryptocurrency boosters claimed, falsely, to be able to deliver".

Colombian President Gustavo Petro has urged the expansion of Brazil's Pix instant payment system to Colombia, framing it as a tool for financial inclusion and regional integration while reducing dependence on U.S.-controlled mechanisms like the OFAC list. He argued that Pix's efficiency and accessibility could strengthen Latin American autonomy, while also criticizing the use of financial sanctions as instruments of political pressure.

On 3 August 2026, Pix launched in eight new countries: Argentina, Chile, France, Paraguay, Portugal, Spain, the United States, and Uruguay.

=== United States government investigation ===
In July 2025, the Office of the United States Trade Representative (USTR) launched an investigation into unfair trading practices by Brazil, focusing on electronic payment services, preferential tariffs, and anti-corruption interference. Among the reasons for the investigation, potential unfair advantaging of Brazilian payment services over US competitors was cited. This appeared to target Pix. Brazilian President Luiz Inácio Lula da Silva has accused U.S. president Donald Trump of being "bothered by Pix" because it "will put an end to credit cards". Lula da Silva's administration has planned to launch a "massive" media campaign in defense of Pix, with the slogan "O Pix é do Brasil" [The Pix is Brazil's], in an effort to associate the system with national sovereignty.

Members of the Brazilian government accuse the investigation of being born of lobbying by U.S. credit card companies and big tech firms. Economist Paul Krugman accused the U.S. of being pressured by the financial sector into the investigation. According to Fundação Getulio Vargas Finance professor Fabio Gallo, Pix is inspiring other countries to develop their own solutions, thereby weakening the dollar and threatening the "end of the Western financial monopoly", in which the U.S. is no longer able to track, tax, or block transactions.

On 15 July 2026, following the conclusion of the USTR investigation, the Trump administration imposed 25% tariffs on a range of Brazilian imports. Furthermore, proposed alterations (flexibilização) to the system in response to United States pressure have faced significant opposition. A survey conducted before the imposition of tariffs found that 72% of the population favored maintaining the current system without changes, despite the threat of U.S. tariffs.

== Features ==
The Brazilian instant payment ecosystem (Pix) was created with the aim of reducing cash transactions and offering an alternative to existing payment instruments, such as bank slip or boleto and ATM, as well as being faster and more affordable. The main advantages of Pix are its full-time availability, the speed of transactions using the system, low-cost functionality, convenience, versatility, open environment, and safety.

=== Aliases ===
Pix allows instant payment between individuals and among individuals, companies, and government (P2P, P2B, B2B, P2G, and B2G). To perform an instant transfer or payment, the payer will need the receiver's Pix alias, or key – the "nickname" used to identify the receiver's transactional account.

For individuals, the aliases can be personal data – such as their CPF number, e-mail address or cell phone number – or, alternatively, a random key (a UUID). These can be turned into a QR code (static or dynamic) for ease of use. Companies use their CNPJ number.

Individuals can create up to five keys for each account they own, while companies can create up to twenty keys; each Pix alias must be associated with only one transactional account; and to pay with Pix it is not necessary to register a Pix alias/key, using the same information that is required to transfer money through other systems of the Brazilian Payment System (TED and DOC).

== Ecosystem ==
Pix is a structured ecosystem that allows carrying out financial payments and transfers instantly. The BCB is responsible for the management and operation of Pix's operational frameworks: the instant payment System (SPI), which is the only infrastructure for instant payments settlement; as well as the "Transaction Accounts Identifier Directory" (DICT), the database linking Pix keys/aliases and the users' transactional account information.

== See also ==
- Instant payment § Notable instant payment systems by country
- BRICS Pay – Distributed payment messaging mechanism system
