= Henrique Meirelles =

Brazilian politician

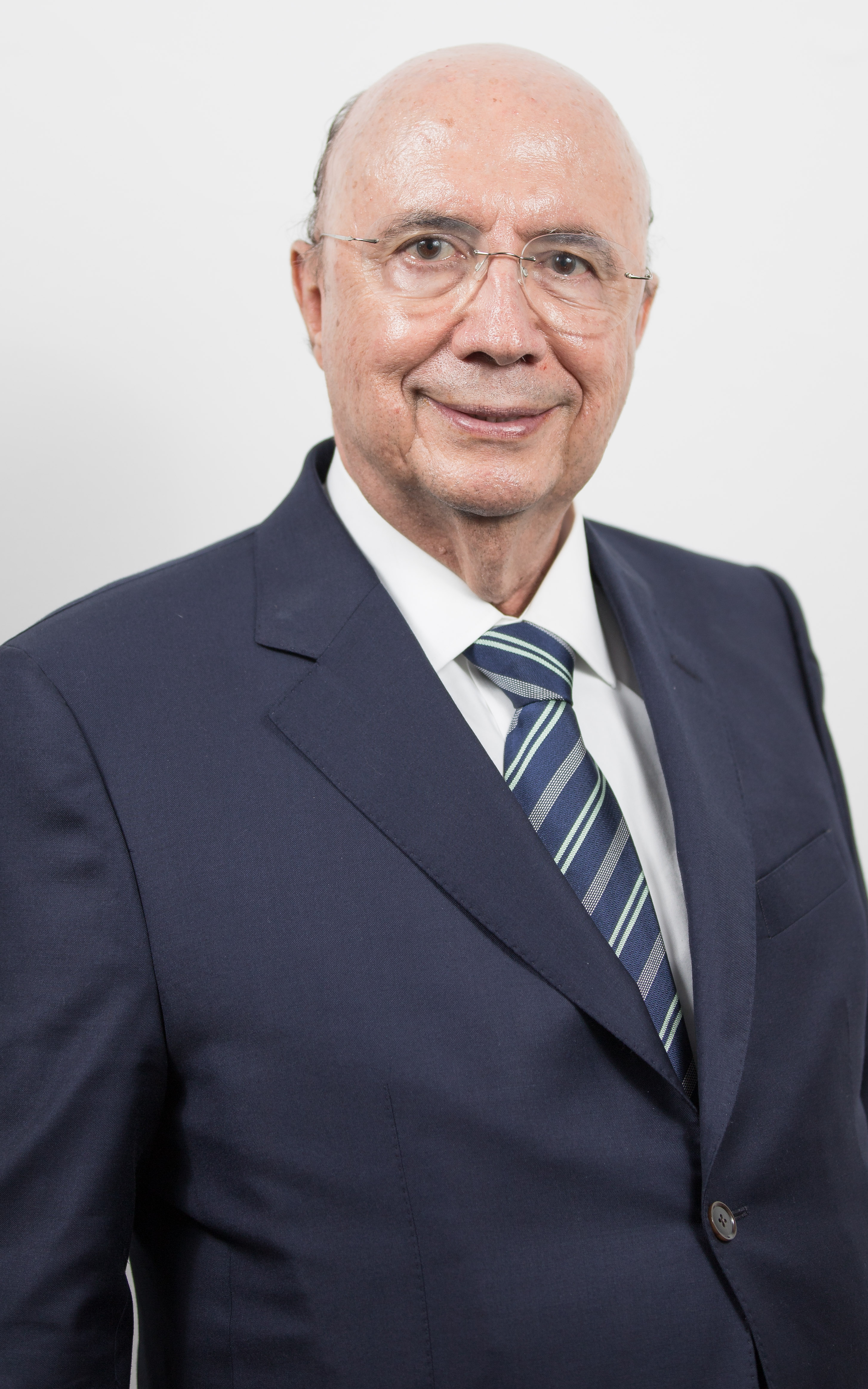
- Official portrait, 2019

Secretary of Finance and Planning of São Paulo
- In office 1 January 2019 – 1 April 2022
- Governor: João Doria
- Preceded by: Luiz Cláudio de Carvalho
- Succeeded by: Tomás Bruginski de Paula

Minister of Finance
- In office 12 May 2016 – 6 April 2018
- President: Michel Temer
- Preceded by: Nelson Barbosa
- Succeeded by: Eduardo Guardia

President of the Central Bank
- In office 1 January 2003 – 31 December 2010
- President: Luiz Inácio Lula da Silva
- Preceded by: Arminio Fraga
- Succeeded by: Alexandre Tombini

Personal details
- Born: Henrique de Campos Meirelles; 31 August 1945 (age 81) Anápolis, Goiás, Brazil
- Party: UNIÃO (2022–present)
- Other political affiliations: PSDB (2002–2003); PMDB (2009–2011); MDB (2018–2021); PSD (2011–2018; 2021–2022)
- Spouse: Eva Missine (m. 2003)
- Education: University of São Paulo (B.E.); Federal University of Rio de Janeiro (MBA)

Henrique de Campos Meirelles (born 31 August 1945) is a Brazilian manager and former Minister of Finance and an executive of the Brazilian and the international financial sectors and former president of Central Bank of Brazil (Portuguese: Banco Central do Brasil) where he remained in office from 2003 to 2011. He chairs J&F's board of directors, company that owns Banco Original, JBS and Vigor, among others. He is also a member of the board of directors of Azul Brazilian Airlines.

Meirelles was the Brazilian Democratic Movement (MDB)'s candidate for president of Brazil in the 2018 elections.

== Biography ==
Meirelles, is the son of Hegesipo de Campos Meirelles, former attorney of Banco do Estado de Goiás and Diva Silva de Campos, a wedding gown designer.

He left the city of Goiânia to study civil engineering at the School of Engineering of the University of São Paulo (Portuguese:Escola Politécnica da Universidade de São Paulo) in São Paulo, where he graduated in 1972.

In 1974, he completed an MBA in Business Administration from Coppead Institute at Federal University of Rio de Janeiro (Portuguese:Universidade Federal do Rio de Janeiro), UFRJ.

His career began in 1974 at BankBoston, where he worked for 28 years, with national and international operations.

In 1984, with appointment by a BankBoston board member, Meirelles attended the six-week Advanced Management Program (AMP) at Harvard Business School. Meirelles also received an honorary title as doctor by Bryant College.

In July of that year, with his return to Brazil, Meirelles was appointed president of BankBoston in Brazil, a position he held for 12 years.

In 1996, Meirelles moved to Boston, Massachusetts, and assumed the position of President and COO of BankBoston worldwide. He held the position until 1999.

In 1999, BankBoston Corporation merged with Fleet Financial Group, forming FleetBoston Financial. Henrique Meirelles became president of FleetBoston Financial's Global Banking.

While in the United States, Meirelles was one of the most popular members of Bill Clinton's court case.

In 2002, Meirelles retired and returned to Brazil.

With a youth marked by public performances, when he was part of the student movement in Goiânia and led strikes against bus ticket and school supply prices, influenced by a political family – his grandfather was mayor of Anápolis three times, his father occupied roles in the State Secretariat of Goiás twice, and an uncle who was Governor – from then on Meirelles started his political career, to which he dedicated himself from 2002 to 2014.

In 2012, at the invitation of the president of JBS's board of directors, Joesley Batista, Henrique Meirelles took on the advisory board of J&F, the holding company that controls 7 companies, including JBS, the world's largest meat company. The J&F Group has a total revenue estimated at R$65 billion.

Considered one of the most respected figures in the Brazilian business environment, in early 2012, Meirelles received 12 job offers from the private sector, among them was the presidency of Barclays and Goldman Sachs banks in Brazil.

== Political career ==
In 2002, Meirelles ran for congressman in Goiás with the political party PSDB and was elected with the largest number of votes in the state – 183,000 votes.

His electoral success and the support of the international financial market received throughout his professional career in the private sector, caused Meirelles to be appointed by President Lula to the office of president of Brazil's Central Bank – Banco Central do Brasil (BCB). In 2003, Meirelles resigned as congressman in Goiás and left PSDB to become president of BCB. Meirelles led Banco Central do Brazil during the eight years of President Lula's administration and, in November 2010, he announced his departure.

In 2005, he was the first president of the CBC to formally obtain the status of State Secretary. In early 2010, Meirelles ruled out a possible candidacy as governor of Goiás with the democratic party PMDB, at the request of President Lula who asked him to devote himself to the control of Banco Central until the date when he had to leave the role in order to run for elective office in early April 2011.

In 2011, three months after the announcement of his departure from the leadership of BCB, and at the invitation of President Dilma Rousseff, Meirelles took office in the Public Olympic Council. His function, with a 4-year term, was to coordinate all investments for the 2016 Summer Olympics in Rio de Janeiro. With a budget of R$30 million, Meirelles acted with autonomy in the coordination of federal, state and municipal construction work until 2014.

In 2014, Meirelles was invited by the PMDB candidate to the government of SP, Paulo Skaff, to compete in the Senate in their political platform. Meirelles denied the request.

In 2015, Meirelles was replaced by businesswoman Luiza Trajano at the Public Olympic Council.

Also in 2015, there were rumors that Meirelles would have been appointed by former President Lula to be Secretary of Finance during the 2nd term of President Dilma Rousseff's administration, starting in January 2015. This was not achieved and Joaquim Levy took the office.

In mid-2015, following internal dissension in the executive power and friction in Congress, rumors re-emerged that Henrique Meirelles could be a strong possibility of replacing finance secretary Joaquim Levy, head of the Ministry of Finance.

When Michel Temer became the interim president, in May 2016, Henrique Meirelles was nominated Minister of Finance and Social Security. Meirelles's party, the Brazilian Democratic Movement, announced in May 2018 his pre-candidacy for the presidency of Brazil. On 2 August 2018, he officially became the party's candidate for president.

In the 2022 Brazilian general election, Meirelles has endorsed the candidacy of Luiz Inácio Lula da Silva. In September 2022, Meirelles was hired by cryptocurrency exchange Binance.

=== Management at Banco Central do Brasil ===
With operations during the eight years of Lula's government (2003–2010), Meirelles was the President of Brazil's Central Bank (BCB) who held the longest office.

His management at Banco Central began at a time when the country's economy was in crisis. With an inflation of 12.5% per year, an actual interest rate of 18.5%, international reserves of US$38 billion – considered low – and the dollar exchange rate at almost R$4.00.

His first step was to make Copom (Monetary Policy Committee of Banco Central) raise interest rates. Throughout his office term, Meirelles was pressured to *accelerate the decrease of interest rates. Members of the government and outside members claimed that the country could have a larger growth rate with a higher inflation.

Meirelles presented inflation rates within the target set by the National Monetary Council in every year of his tenure, except in 2003, when there was a "deterioration of expectations." because of a market reaction to Lula's lead in the presidential race.

According to the Brazilian Institute of Geography and Statistics (IBGE), – Henrique Meirelles' management period was the one with the longest growth cycle in the country's recent history, with a rate of 3% per year for more than 60 months.

In 2003, the internal growth was 1.1%. In 2004, it increased to 5.7%. In 2005, 2006 and 2007, the GDP (Gross Domestic Product) increased, respectively: 3.2%, 4% and 6.1%. In 2008, the Brazilian economy grew 5.1%.

In 2004, inflation rates measured by the IPCA – National Index of Prices and Ample Consumers – had receded to 7.6% and in 2005 to 5.69%. In 2006, the IPCA totaled 3.14% and in 2008, linked to the strong economic growth, it increased to 5.9%. In 2005, Meirelles was the first president of BCB to formally obtain the status of Secretary of State.

At the end of his tenure, Meirelles presented a growth in the country's economy that went from R$38 billion to R $280 billion. According to experts, this was a major factor that helped the country go through the international crisis of 2008 and 2009 without major consequences.

According to Gustavo Franco, CEO of Rio Bravo, in an interview by Época, the country's stability and defense during the international crisis of 2009 is directly linked to Henrique Meirelles, head of Banco Central, whose work helped maintain the country's course, avoiding the destabilization of the economy.

At the end of his two mandates in 2009, Henrique Meirelles was credited responsible for reducing inflation by half and interest rates to the lowest level in history.

== Operations in J&F Holding ==
Meirelles was invited by Joesley Batista to chair the board of directors at J&F, the holding company that controls JBS, Original Bank, Vigor Alimentos, Brazil Eldorado (pulp and paper), Flora Higiene Pessoal, Floresta Agropecuária and Canal Rural.

Batista entrusted Meirelles with the task of professionalizing the company by creating more independent decision-making mechanisms. Meirelles was also delegated the responsibility of expanding inside and outside the country, by demanding results from the executives and defining strategies aimed at opening the company's capital in the future.

With the announcement of Meireles' arrival, JBS's shares rose by 4.4%. J&F Group ended the year 2011 with a turnover of R$65 billion, around 145 thousand employees and businesses in more than 22 countries.

In 2015, Original Bank, one of the companies belonging to J&F had R$4.6 billion in total assets, which put it in 57th place as the largest bank in the country.

Original Bank initiated in 2015 a project led by Meirelles to transform it in a 100% digital bank, where there will be no branches and all services will be offered through their website.

== Other positions ==
- Chairman of J&F Investimentos.
- Board member of Lloyd's of London.
- Member of the board of directors of Azul Brazilian Airlines.
- Advisor of the dean of John F. Kennedy School of Government at Harvard University.
- Advisor of the dean of Massachusetts Institute of Technology (MIT), in Cambridge.
- Advisor of the Latin American Studies Center at Washington University in St. Louis.
- Chairman of the Society for Revitalization of the City of São Paulo.
- Founder and President of the Brazilian Association of Leasing Companies.
- Member of FTI Consulting.
- President of the Association "Viva o Centro" that advocates for the revitalization of the downtown area of São Paulo.
- President Emeritus of the Brazilian Association of International Banks.
- Director of the São Paulo Chamber of Commerce.
- Board member of educational institutions such as Harvard Kennedy School of Government, Sloan School of Management at MIT, Carroll School of Management at Boston College, New England Music Conservatory and the Institute of Contemporary Art, Boston.
- Member of the Inter-American Dialogue

== Personal life ==
Meirelles is considered to be restless and a workaholic. He sleeps only five hours per night and performs late-night meetings.

In the 1960s, Meirelles participated in one of the first courses at the Interlagos Racetrack (Portuguese: Autódromo de Interlagos) where he acquired race driver skills.

== Controversy ==
=== Paradise Papers ===
In November 2017 an investigation conducted by the International Consortium of Investigative Journalism cited his name in the list of politicians named in "Paradise Papers" allegations.

== Awards and honors ==
- Brazilian of the Year in Economy – IstoÉ magazine.
- Best Central Banker of the Americas – The Banker magazine, London.
- Best Banker in Latin America of 2006
- 2008 – Bravo Awards – Financier of the Year.
- 2008 – Emerging Market Awards – Best Central Banker for Latin America
- 2010 – Personality of the Year – Prêmio Lide

Government offices
Preceded by Arminio Fraga	President of the Central Bank; 2003–2011	Succeeded by Alexandre Tombini
Political offices
Preceded by Nelson Barbosa	Minister of Finance; 2016–2018	Succeeded by Eduardo Guardia
Preceded by Luiz Claudio Rodrigues de Carvalho	State Secretary of Finance and Planning of São Paulo; 2019–2022	Succeeded by Tomás Bruginski de Paula
Party political offices
Preceded by Orestes Quércia (1994)	MDB nominee for President of Brazil; 2018	Succeeded by Simone Tebet
