= Cabinet of Michel Temer =

2016–2019 cabinet of Brazil

Temer Cabinet
- Cabinet of Brazil
- 2016–2019
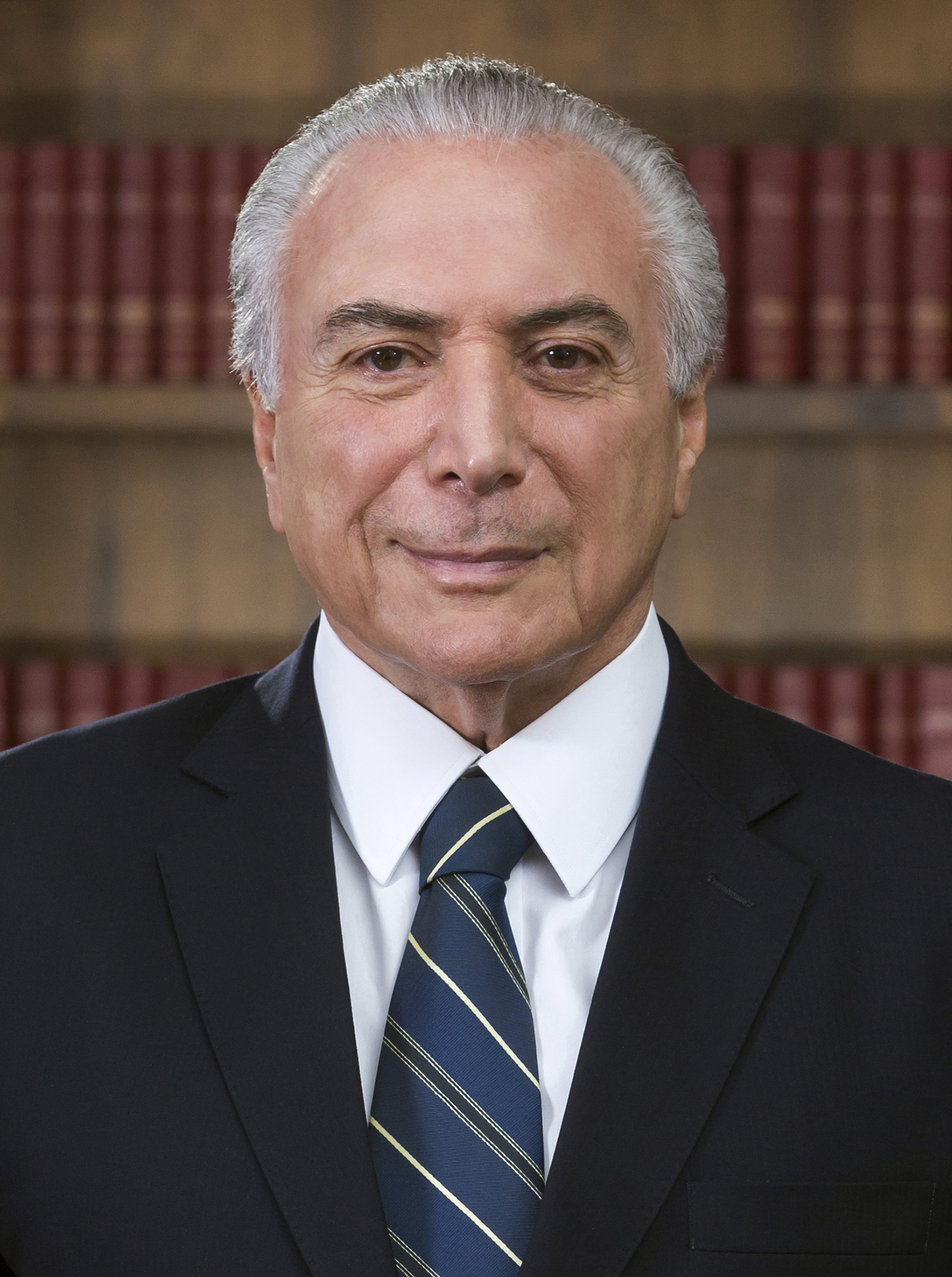
- Date formed: 12 May 2016
- Date dissolved: 1 January 2019

People and organisations
- President: Michel Temer
- President's history: Former Vice President of Brazil (2011–2016); Former Federal Deputy from São Paulo (1994–2010)
- No. of ministers: 28
- Ministers removed: 29
- Member parties: Brazilian Democratic Movement; Progressistas; Brazilian Social Democracy Party; Democrats; Party of the Republic; Social Democratic Party; Brazilian Republican Party; Brazilian Labour Party; Republican Party of the Social Order; Solidariedade; Social Christian Party; Social Liberal Party; Popular Socialist Party; Avante; Patriota
- Status in legislature: Majority coalition
- Opposition parties: Workers' Party; Brazilian Socialist Party; Democratic Labour Party; Communist Party of Brazil; Socialism and Liberty Party; Free Fatherland Party
- Opposition leaders: Weverton Rocha; Humberto Costa

History
- Incoming formation: Impeachment of Dilma Rousseff
- Legislature term: 55th Legislature of the National Congress
- Advice and consent: Federal Senate
- Predecessor: Cabinet of Dilma Rousseff
- Successor: Cabinet of Jair Bolsonaro

After the suspension of president Dilma Rousseff in May 2016 due to her impeachment process, vice president Michel Temer assumed as acting president and formed his cabinet, which was kept after her removal in August.

== Supporting parties ==
Party	Main ideology	Leader
Government parties
Brazilian Democratic Movement (MDB)	Big tent	Romero Jucá
Brazilian Social Democracy Party (PSDB)	Neoliberalism	Aécio Neves
Social Democratic Party (PSD)	Conservative liberalism	Gilberto Kassab
Progressive Party (PP)	Liberal conservatism	Ciro Nogueira
Popular Socialist Party (PPS)	Social democracy	Roberto Freire
Brazilian Socialist Party (PSB)	Social liberalism	Carlos Siqueira
Brazilian Republican Party (PRB)	Social conservatism	Marcos Pereira
Democrats (DEM)	Economic liberalism	José Agripino Maia
Green Party (PV)	Green liberalism	José Luiz Penna
Brazilian Labour Party (PTB)	Labourism	Roberto Jefferson
Republican Party of the Social Order (PROS)	Republicanism	Eurípedes Júnior
Party of the Republic (PR)	Conservatism	Valdemar Costa Neto

== Cabinet ==
Party key	MDB	PSDB	PSD	PP	No party
Party key	PPS	PSB	PRB	DEM	
Party key	PV	PTB	PROS	PR	

Portfolio	Portrait	Minister	Took office	Left office	Note
Cabinet ministers
Chief of Staff		Eliseu Padilha	12 May 2016	31 December 2018	
Secretary of Government		Geddel Vieira Lima	12 May 2016	25 November 2016	
Secretary of Government		Antônio Imbassahy	3 February 2017	15 December 2017	Federal deputy on leave
Secretary of Government		Carlos Marun	15 December 2017	28 December 2018	Federal deputy on leave
Secretary-General of the Presidency		Moreira Franco	3 February 2017	6 April 2018	
Secretary-General of the Presidency		Ronaldo Nogueira	28 May 2018	31 December 2019	Federal deputy on leave
Attorney General		Fábio Medina Osório	12 May 2016	9 September 2016	
Attorney General		Grace Mendonça	9 September 2016	31 December 2018	
Secretary of Institutional Security		Sérgio Etchegoyen	12 May 2016	31 December 2018	
Minister of Agriculture, Livestock and Supply		Blairo Maggi	12 May 2016	31 December 2018	Senator on leave
Minister of Cities		Bruno Araújo	12 May 2016	13 November 2017	Federal deputy on leave
Minister of Cities		Alexandre Baldy	22 November 2017	31 December 2018	Federal deputy on leave
Minister of Culture		Marcelo Calero	24 May 2016	18 November 2016	
Minister of Culture		Roberto Freire	23 November 2016	22 May 2017	
Minister of Culture		João Batista de Andrade	22 May 2017	16 June 2017	Acting minister
Minister of Culture		Sérgio Sá Leitão	25 July 2017	31 December 2018	
Minister of Defense		Raul Jungmann	12 May 2016	27 February 2018	Federal deputy on leave
Minister of Defense		Joaquim Silva e Luna	27 February 2018	31 December 2018	
Minister of Education		Mendonça Filho	12 May 2016	6 April 2018	Federal deputy on leave
Minister of Education		Rossieli Soares	6 April 2018	31 December 2018	
Minister of Environment		Sarney Filho	12 May 2016	6 April 2018	Federal deputy on leave
Minister of Environment		Edson Duarte	6 April 2018	31 December 2018	
Minister of Finance		Henrique Meirelles	12 May 2016	6 April 2018	
Minister of Finance		Eduardo Guardia	6 April 2018	31 December 2018	
Minister of Foreign Affairs		José Serra	12 May 2016	22 February 2017	Senator on leave
Minister of Foreign Affairs		Marcos Galvão	22 February 2017	7 March 2017	Acting minister
Minister of Foreign Affairs		Aloysio Nunes	7 March 2017	31 December 2018	Senator on leave
Minister of Health		Ricardo Barros	12 May 2016	6 April 2018	Federal deputy on leave
Minister of Health		Gilberto Occhi	6 April 2018	31 December 2018	
Minister of Human Rights		Luislinda Valois	3 February 2017	19 February 2018	
Minister of Human Rights		Gustavo do Vale Rocha	19 February 2018	31 December 2018	
Minister of Industry, Foreign Trade and Services		Marcos Pereira	12 May 2016	3 January 2018	Federal deputy on leave
Minister of Industry, Foreign Trade and Services		Marcos Jorge	4 January 2018	31 December 2018	
Minister of Justice		Alexandre de Moraes	12 May 2016	7 February 2017	
Minister of Justice		José Levi do Amaral	7 February 2017	7 March 2017	Acting minister
Minister of Justice		Osmar Serraglio	7 March 2017	28 May 2017	Federal deputy on leave
Minister of Justice		Torquato Jardim	28 May 2017	31 December 2018	
Minister of Labour		Ronaldo Nogueira	12 May 2016	27 December 2017	Federal deputy on leave
Minister of Labour		Helton Yomura	1 January 2018	5 July 2018	Acting minister until 10 April 2018
Minister of Labour		Caio Vieira de Mello	10 July 2018	31 December 2018	
Minister of Mines and Energy		Fernando Coelho Filho	12 May 2016	6 April 2018	Federal deputy on leave
Minister of Mines and Energy		Moreira Franco	6 April 2018	31 December 2018	
Ministry of Integration and Regional Development		Helder Barbalho	12 May 2016	6 April 2018	
Ministry of Integration and Regional Development		Pádua Andrade	6 April 2018	31 December 2018	
Minister of Planning, Budget and Management		Romero Jucá	12 May 2016	23 May 2016	Senator on leave
Minister of Planning, Budget and Management		Dyogo Oliveira	23 May 2016	6 April 2018	
Minister of Planning, Budget and Management		Esteves Colnago	6 April 2018	31 December 2018	
Minister of Public Security		Raul Jungmann	27 February 2018	31 December 2018	Extraordinary ministry
Minister of Science, Technology, Innovation and Communication		Gilberto Kassab	12 May 2016	31 December 2018	
Minister of Social and Agrarian Development		Osmar Terra	12 May 2016	6 April 2018	Federal deputy on leave
Minister of Social and Agrarian Development		Alberto Beltrame	6 April 2018	31 December 2018	
Minister of Sports		Leonardo Picciani	12 May 2016	6 April 2018	Federal deputy on leave
Minister of Sports		Leandro Cruz	6 April 2018	31 December 2018	
Minister of Tourism		Henrique Eduardo Alves	12 May 2016	16 June 2016	
Minister of Tourism		Alberto Alves	17 June 2016	5 October 2016	Acting minister
Minister of Tourism		Marx Beltrão	5 October 2016	6 April 2018	Federal deputy on leave
Minister of Tourism		Vinicius Lummertz	6 April 2018	31 December 2018	
Minister of Transparency, Oversight and Comptroller General of the Union		Fabiano Silveira	12 May 2016	30 May 2016	
Minister of Transparency, Oversight and Comptroller General of the Union		Carlos Higino	30 May 2016	1 June 2016	Acting minister
Minister of Transparency, Oversight and Comptroller General of the Union		Torquato Jardim	1 June 2016	31 May 2017	
Minister of Transparency, Oversight and Comptroller General of the Union		Wagner Rosário	31 May 2017	31 December 2022	
Minister of Transport		Maurício Quintella Lessa	12 May 2016	2 April 2018	Federal deputy on leave
Minister of Transport		Valter Casimiro	2 April 2018	31 December 2018	
Non-cabinet positions
President of the Central Bank		Ilan Goldfajn	9 June 2016	28 February 2019	
Chair of the Brazilian Development Bank		Maria Silvia Bastos	1 June 2016	26 May 2017	
Chair of the Brazilian Development Bank		Paulo Rabello de Castro	1 June 2017	6 April 2018	
Chair of the Brazilian Development Bank		Dyogo Oliveira	9 April 2018	7 January 2019	
CEO of Petrobras		Pedro Parente	1 June 2016	1 June 2018	
CEO of Petrobras		Ivan Monteiro	1 June 2018	3 January 2019	
Chief of the Joint Staff of the Armed Forces		Ademir Sobrinho	7 December 2015	19 January 2019	
Commander of the Brazilian Army		Eduardo Villas Bôas	7 February 2015	9 January 2019	
Commander of the Brazilian Navy		Eduardo Leal Ferreira	7 February 2015	9 January 2019	
Commander of the Brazilian Air Force		Nivaldo Luiz Rossato	30 January 2015	4 January 2019	
