= André Mendonça =

Brazilian lawyer and supreme court judge

His Excellency André Mendonça
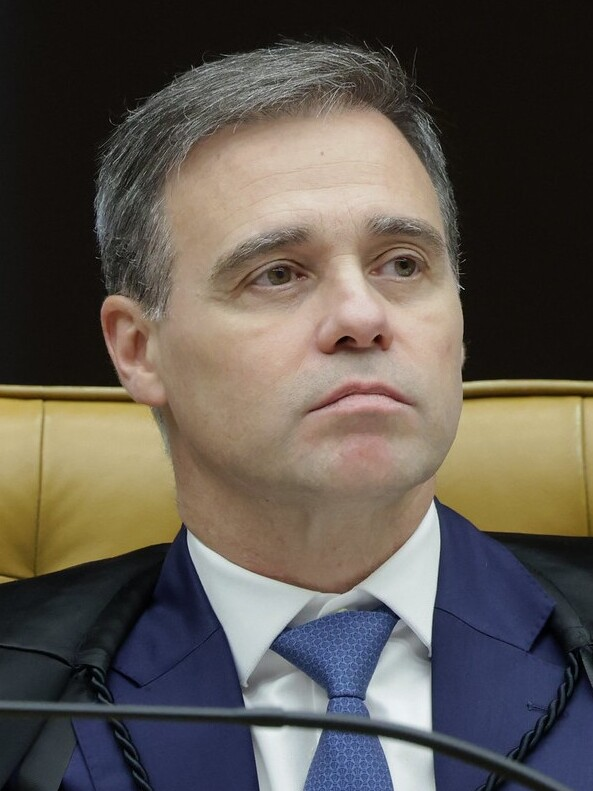
- Mendonça in October 2025

Justice of the Supreme Federal Court
- Incumbent
- Assumed office 16 December 2021
- Nominated by: Jair Bolsonaro
- Preceded by: Marco Aurélio Mello

Attorney General of the Union
- In office 29 March 2021 – 6 August 2021
- President: Jair Bolsonaro
- Preceded by: José Levi do Amaral
- Succeeded by: Bruno Bianco
- In office 1 January 2019 – 28 April 2020
- President: Jair Bolsonaro
- Preceded by: Grace Mendonça
- Succeeded by: José Levi do Amaral

Minister of Justice and Public Security
- In office 29 April 2020 – 29 March 2021
- President: Jair Bolsonaro
- Preceded by: Sergio Moro
- Succeeded by: Anderson Torres

Personal details
- Born: André Luiz de Almeida Mendonça; 27 December 1972 (age 53) Santos, São Paulo, Brazil
- Education: Law School, Bauru University Center (LL.B.); South American Theological College (BTh); University of Salamanca (LL.M., LL.D.)

Religious life
- Religion: Christian
- Denomination: Presbyterian
- Church: Presbyterian Church of Brazil

André Luiz de Almeida Mendonça (born 27 December 1972) is a Brazilian attorney, Presbyterian pastor, and politician currently serving as Justice of the Supreme Federal Court. He is the third evangelical Christian positioned to join the top court, and former Minister of Justice and Public Security and Attorney General of the Union in the administration of President Jair Bolsonaro.

Mendonça was an attorney for Brazil since 2000 and was special assistant of the Comptroller General of the Union Wagner Rosário between 2016 and 2018.

== Biography ==
After graduating with a degree in law in 1993 at Law School of Bauru University Center, in São Paulo, Mendonça concluded his specialization in public law at University of Brasília, master's degree at University of Salamanca, with a thesis about corruption and the Rechtsstaat and received the highest grade for his doctorate thesis, Estado de Derecho y Gobernanza Global ("Rechtsstaat and Global Governance"), at the same university. Mendonça is assistant professor in Salamanca and the Getúlio Vargas Foundation.

He also graduated with a degree in theology at South American Theological College, in Londrina, and served as a pastor at the Presbyterian Church of Brazil, in Brasília.

He was a lawyer at Petrobras Distribuidora, until joining the career of Attorney for Brazil at the Attorney General's office (AGU) in 2000. He served as Head of the Solicitor General Office at Londrina, Vice-Principal of the office's school, coordinator of Disciplinary Measures and General Auditor.

Mendonça was director of Department of Public Patrimony and Administrative Probity, nominated by then Attorney General Dias Toffoli, and coordinated the Permanent Group of AGU Pro-Active Acting. In 2010, the department under his leadership helped to recover part of R$169 million (US$ 101,026,479.53), intended for the construction of the Labor Regional Court in São Paulo, which were embezzled from public safes. Among the convicted were justice Nicolau dos Santos Neto and then Senator Luiz Estevão.

He also gained prominence at AGU for winning the special category in Innovare Award in 2011 - which honors efficient practices in the Judiciary, Public Prosecutor's Office, Public Defense and advocacy. Innovare recognized the practices of fight against corruption adopted by AGU.

Between 2016 and 2018, he was special assistant for Comptroller General Wagner de Campos Rosário.

On 21 November 2018, President-elect Jair Bolsonaro named him as the next Attorney General. He succeeded Grace Mendonça, who praised the selection of her successor from among AGU employees. Prior to his nomination, Mendonça had mostly worked at the Controllership General of the Union, where he was responsible to lead leniency agreements which involved the collaboration of great companies involved in illicit cases.

On 27 April 2020, Bolsonaro named Mendonça to be Minister of Justice and Public Security upon the resignation of Sergio Moro. He assumed that office on 29 April. One year later, Mendonça return to his former office of Attorney General and was replaced by Anderson Torres.

After the retirement of Justice Marco Aurélio Mello from the Supreme Federal Court in July 2021, President Bolsonaro announced Mendonça to replace him in the court.

He left the AGU on 6 August 2021 replaced by Bruno Bianco. Mendonça's appointment for the Supreme Court was approved by the Senate on 1 December 2021 in a voting of 47–32. making him the first evangelical Christian positioned to join the top court.

== Banco Master scandal ==
In 2026, André Mendonça became the reporting judge of the Banco Master scandal. However, this appointment would shine a light to unusual movements involving his education NGO, Iter Institute. Institute Iter received over ten million reais with over 28 contracts with public entities, with none of those contracts being made under the usual public bidding processes. After audios of the CEO of Banco Master, Daniel Vorcaro were leaked by journalist Paulo Motoryn, Mendonça would also admit to newspaper Estado de São Paulo that he has met Vorcaro the at the Iter Institute's main office in 2025, as well as Vorcaro's lawyer afterwards. Mendonça and his wife would leave Iter Institute after the information went public.

On September 3, Mendonça was accused by fellow Supreme Court Judge Alexandre de Moraes, also involved in the Banco Master scandal, of the crimes of Misconduct in Public Office, high crimes and misdemeanors and abuse of authority. He also accused Mendonça of being the reporting judge of the Banco Master scandal and the INSS fraud scheme to support "certain political groups".

Political offices
Preceded by Grace Mendonça	Attorney General of the Union; 2019–2020; 2021	Succeeded by José Levi do Amaral
Preceded by José Levi do Amaral	Attorney General of the Union; 2019–2020; 2021	Succeeded by Bruno Bianco
Preceded by Sergio Moro	Minister of Justice and Public Security; 2020–2021	Succeeded by Anderson Torres
Legal offices
Preceded by Marco Aurélio Mello	Justice of the Supreme Federal Court; 2021–present	Incumbent
