= Bruno Dantas =

Brazilian Minister of the Federal Court of Accounts

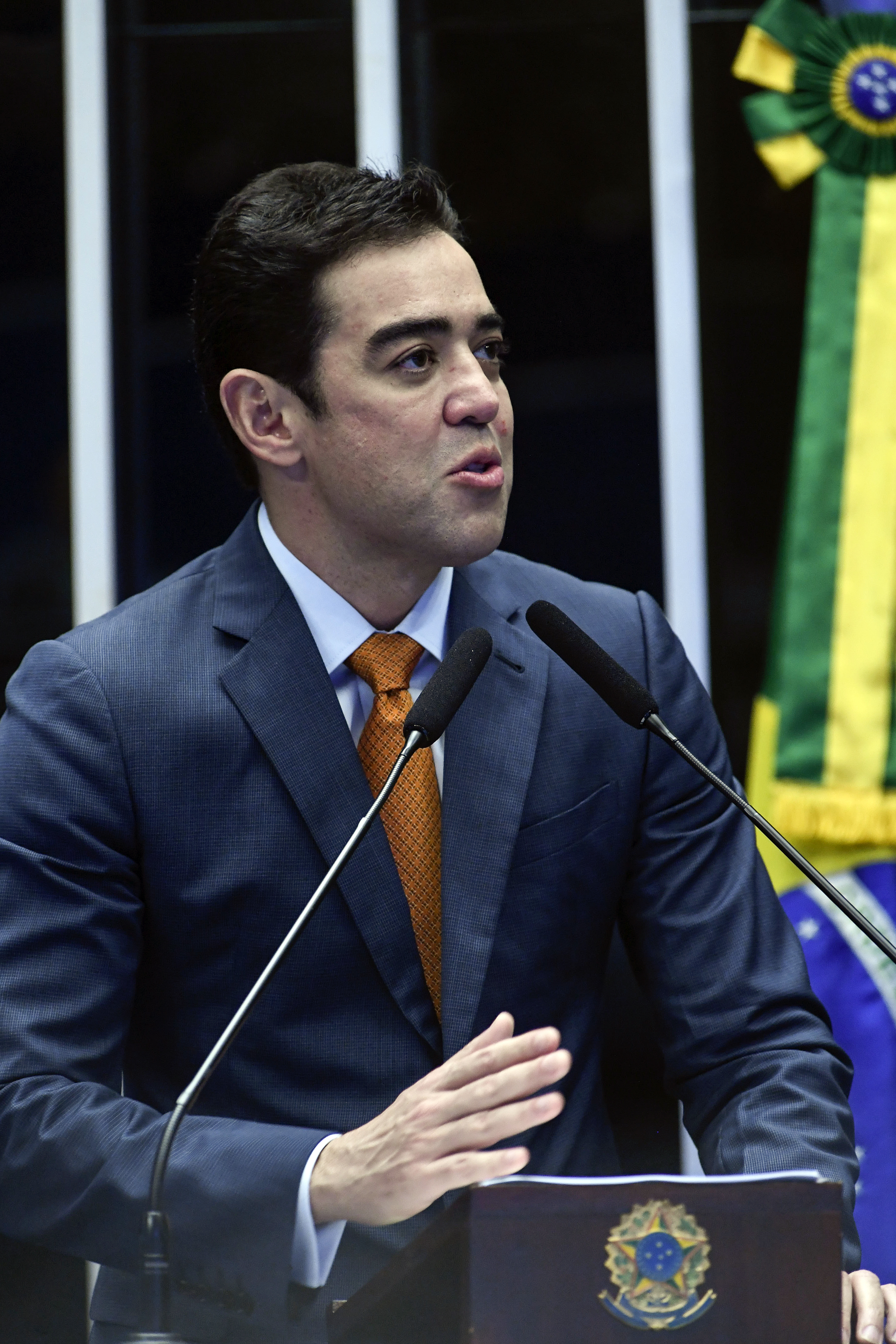

Minister of the Federal Court of Accounts
- Incumbent
- Assumed office 13 August 2014
- Nominated by: Dilma Rousseff
- Preceded by: Valmir Campelo

President of the Federal Court of Accounts
- In office 25 July 2022 – 31 December 2024
- Preceded by: Ana Arraes
- Succeeded by: Vital do Rêgo Filho

Councillor of the National Council of Justice
- In office 9 August 2011 – 9 August 2013
- Nominated by: Dilma Rousseff
- Preceded by: Marcelo Neves
- Succeeded by: Fabiano Silveira

Personal details
- Born: Bruno Dantas Nascimento; 6 March 1978 (age 48) Salvador, Bahia, Brazil
- Education: Catholic University of Brasília; Pontifical Catholic University of São Paulo
- Awards: Order of Defence Merit (Grand Officer) Order of Rio Branco (Grand Cross)

Bruno Dantas Nascimento (born 6 March 1978) is a Brazilian jurist, currently serving as a lifetime minister of the Tribunal de Contas da União (TCU). He has been a member of the court since 2014, following his nomination by the Federal Senate, where he previously worked for eleven years as a permanent member of the Senior Advisory Office. He was also chair of the International Organization of Supreme Audit Institutions (INTOSAI) between 2022 and 2024 and Member of the United Nations Board of Auditors.

== Career ==
Bruno Dantas began his career as a clerk at the Federal District and Territories Court of Justice, a position he held from 1998 to 2003. In 2003, he became a legislative consultant for the Federal Senate, a role he performed until 2014, serving as the Senate's General Legislative Consultant from 2007 to 2011. Between 2009 and 2010, he was part of the committee of jurists established by the President of the Federal Senate and chaired by Justice Luiz Fux to draft the Civil Procedure Code bill. During the same period, he was appointed by the Federal Senate as a counselor to the National Council of the Public Prosecutor’s Office (CNMP) for the 2009–2011 term, where he proposed the creation of the Public Prosecutor’s Transparency Portal and a national database to centralize information on public civil actions and inquiries initiated by the Public Prosecutor’s Office. From 2011 to 2013, he served as a counselor to the National Justice Council (CNJ), chairing the Commission for Federal and Parliamentary Articulation and authoring Resolution No. 156/2012, which introduced the requirement of a clean record for appointments to commissioned positions in the Judiciary.

In 2014, he was nominated by the Federal Senate for the position of Minister of the Federal Court of Accounts (TCU), assuming office on August 13, 2014, after approval by the Chamber of Deputies. On December 14, 2022, he took office as President of the TCU. During his presidency, he was elected President of the International Organization of Supreme Audit Institutions (INTOSAI) in November 2022, an organization that brings together audit institutions globally and holds consultative status with the United Nations Economic and Social Council (ECOSOC).

He is the author of books and articles on civil procedural law and regulatory law and serves as a professor at the Rio de Janeiro State University, as well as in the graduate programs of Universidade Nove de Julho and the Fundação Getulio Vargas.

== Academic Background ==
- Bachelor’s Degree in Law (2002), Catholic University of Brasília (UCB), Brazil.
- Master’s Degree in Law (2007), Pontifical Catholic University of São Paulo (PUC/SP), Brazil.
- Doctorate in Law (2013), Pontifical Catholic University of São Paulo (PUC/SP), Brazil.
- Postdoctoral Research (2015-2016), Rio de Janeiro State University (UERJ), Brazil.

== Contributions in International Audit and Governance ==
=== INTOSAI Presidency ===
Between November 2022 and 2024, Bruno Dantas has served as President of the International Organization of Supreme Audit Institutions (INTOSAI).

Under his leadership, INTOSAI strengthened its focus on transparency, efficiency, and global cooperation in public resource management.

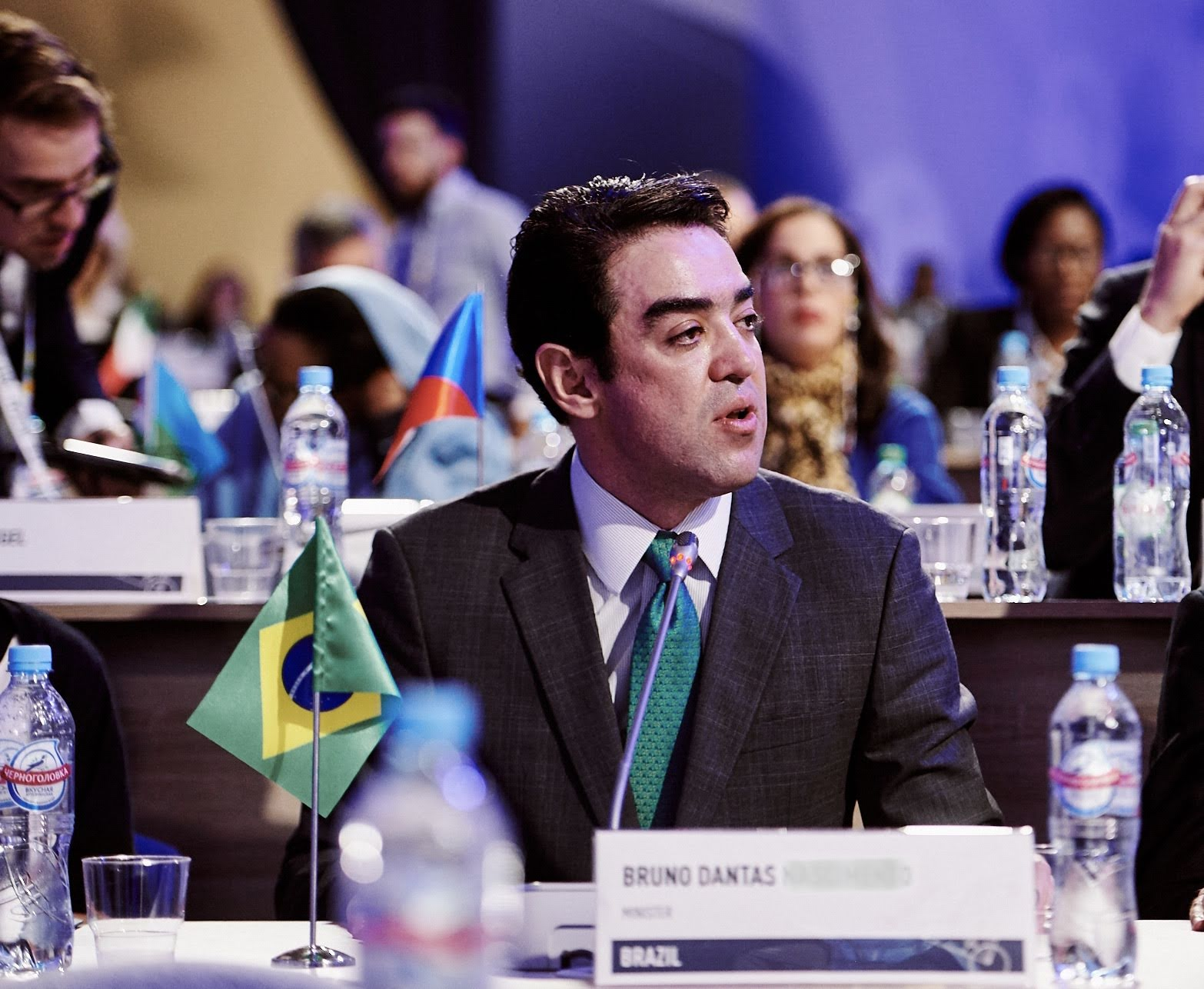
Minister Bruno Dantas

==== ClimateScanner ====
Dantas introduced ClimateScanner, a tool for assessing nations' climate policies and resource management in combating climate change. It evaluates public policies' effectiveness and transparency, helping countries identify gaps and enhance climate governance.

==== INTOSAI Development Initiative Board ====
In June 2023, Dantas joined the Board of the INTOSAI Development Initiative (IDI), which supports Supreme Audit Institutions (SAIs) in governance, independence, and professional development. Founded in 1986, IDI operates as an independent entity under Norwegian law, providing resources for SAIs facing challenging circumstances.

=== United Nations Board of Auditors ===
During Dantas’s tenure, Brazil was elected to the United Nations Board of Auditors, which oversees the financial integrity of the United Nations.

=== OLACEFS Infrastructure Committee (GTInfra) ===
As Acting Vice President of the Organization of Latin American and Caribbean Supreme Audit Institutions (OLACEFS), Dantas advanced the GTInfra initiative. This project promotes transparency, efficiency, and sustainability in infrastructure oversight, sharing best practices and fostering innovation in public works management. It aligns with sustainable development goals by emphasizing environmental and social accountability in infrastructure projects.

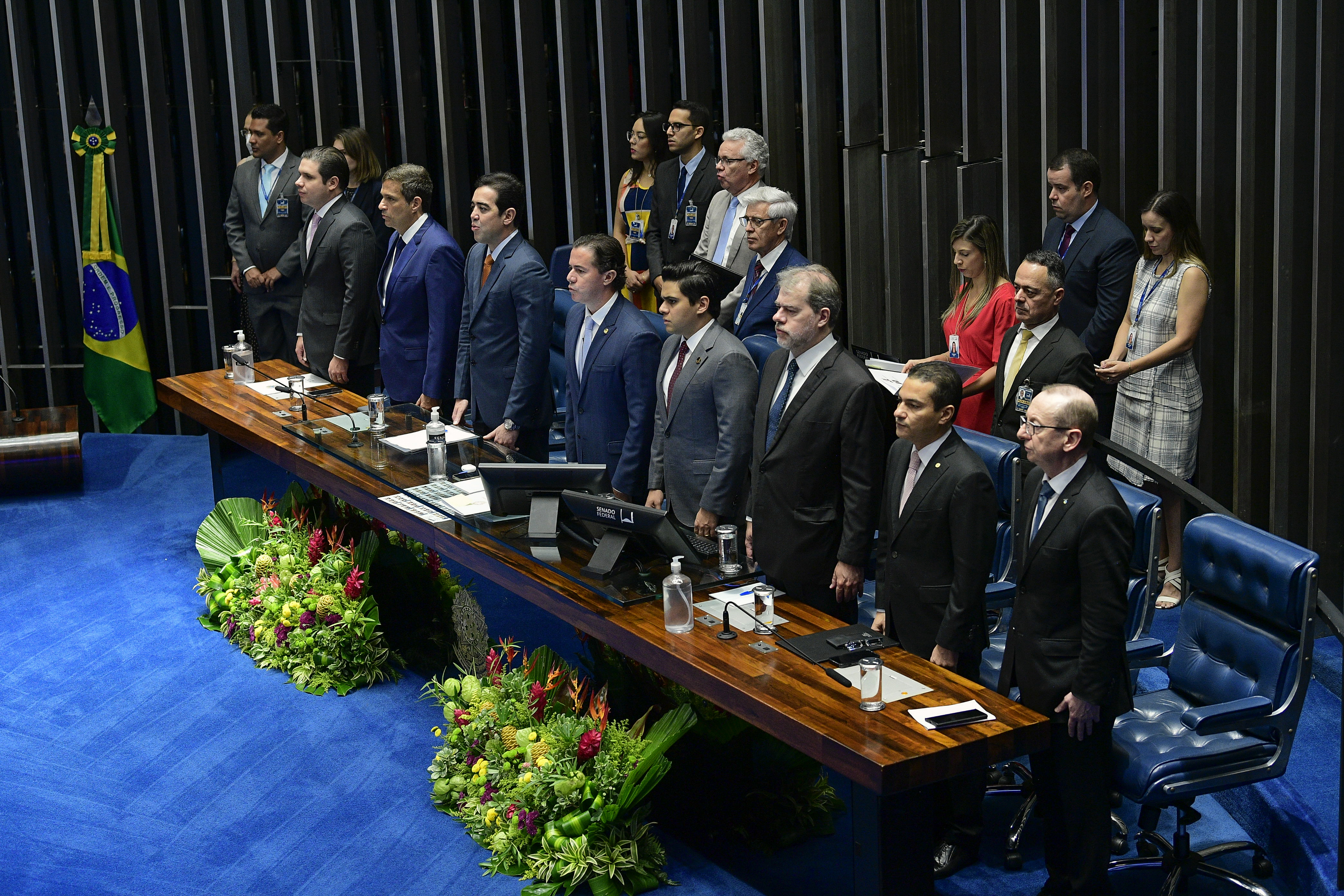
Senado

Legal offices
Preceded by Marcelo Neves	Councillor of the National Justice Council; 2011–2013	Succeeded by Fabiano Silveira
Preceded by Valmir Campelo	Minister of the Federal Court of Accounts; 2014–present	Incumbent
Preceded by Ana Arraes	President of the Federal Court of Accounts; 2022–2024	Succeeded by Vital do Rêgo Filho
