= Carlos Higino =

Brazilian economist and politician

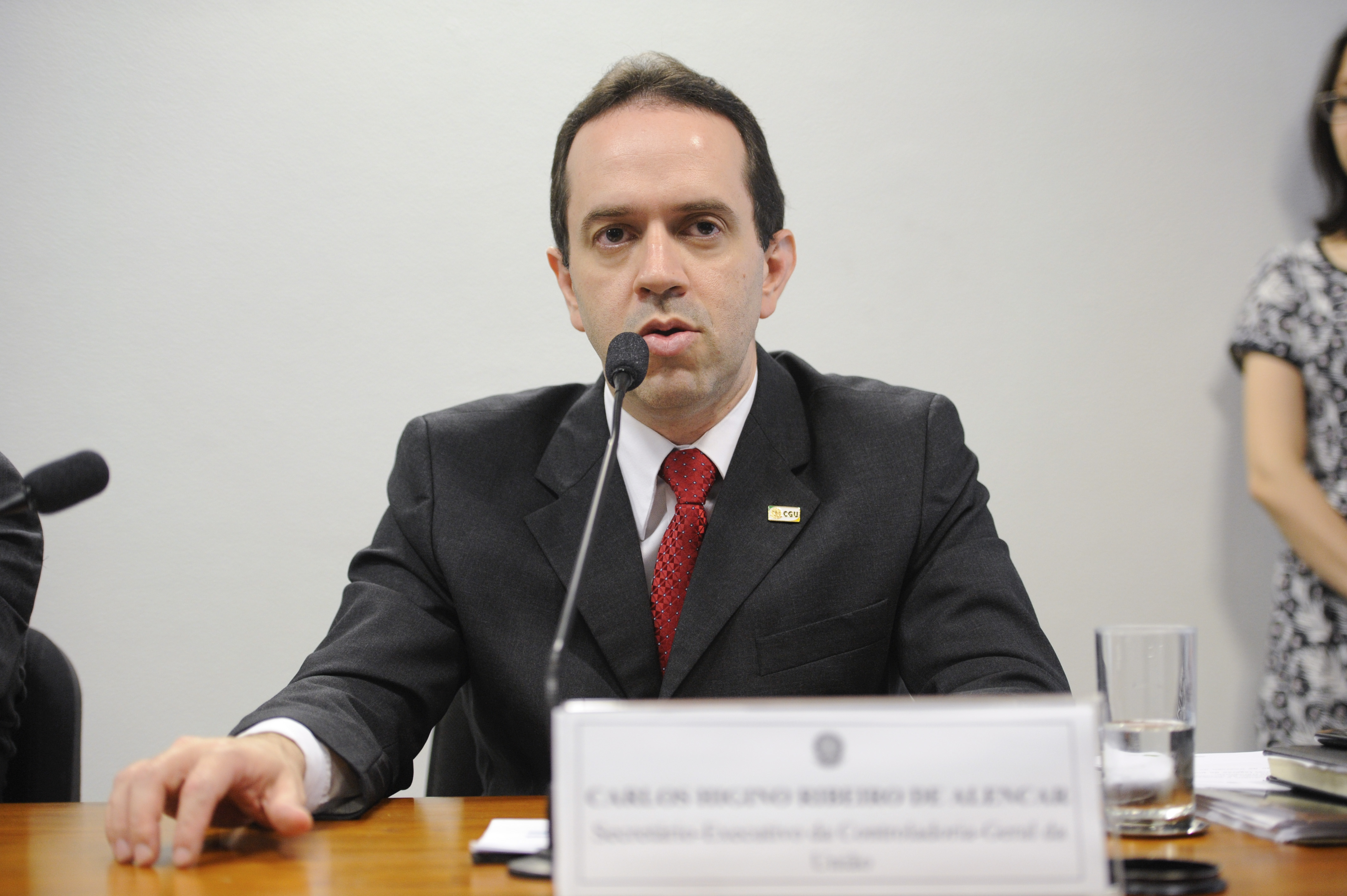
- Higino in 2014

Minister of Transparency, Supervision and Control of Brazil
- In office 30 May 2016 – 1 June 2016
- Nominated by: Michel Temer
- Preceded by: Fabiano Silveira
- Succeeded by: Torquato Jardim

Personal details
- Born: Carlos Higino Ribeiro de Alencar
- Spouse: Manuela Sabóia Moura de Alencar
- Education: University of São Paulo, Federal University of Ceará

Carlos Higino Ribeiro de Alencar is a Brazilian economist and politician. He was the interim and second Minister of Transparency, Monitoring and Control and was the executive secretary of the Comptroller General of the Union (CGU).

== Education ==
Higino graduated in economics from the University of São Paulo in 1994 and in Law from the Federal University of Ceará in 2003. He earned a master's degree in Constitutional Law at the Brazilian Institute of Public Law (IDP) in 2009, and specialized in labor law at the Community Foundation of Higher Education of Itabira (Funcesi).

== Administrative career ==
Higino served as Internal Affairs Offices of Belém and Fortaleza for the Secretaria da Receita Federal do Brasil of the Ministry of Finance. He then served as an advisor at the now-defunct Comptroller General of Brazil (CGU). Higino, an opponent of nepotism in Brazil, was noted for the simultaneous appointment of his wife, Manuela Sabóia Moura de Alencar, as Chief of the Medical Department of the CGU. Higino and Sabóia maintained a professional distance but started their tenures at the CGU on the same day.

Higino later served as Secretary of State for Transparency and Control of the Federal District of Brazil. He was the second Vice President of the National Council of Internal Control (CONACI). He is also an acting instructor at the School of Finance Administration of the Order of Attorneys of Brazil-Federal District.
