= Vital do Rêgo Filho =

Brazilian politician and doctor

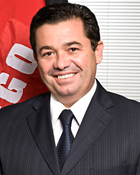

Minister of the Federal Court of Accounts
- Incumbent
- Assumed office 22 December 2014
- Nominated by: Dilma Rousseff
- Preceded by: José Jorge

President of the Federal Court of Accounts
- Incumbent
- Assumed office 1 January 2025
- Preceded by: Bruno Dantas

Senator for Paraíba
- In office 1 February 2011 – 22 December 2014

Federal Deputy
- In office 1 February 2007 – 1 February 2011
- Constituency: Paraíba

State Deputy of Paraíba
- In office 1 February 1995 – 1 February 2007
- Constituency: At-large

Councillor of Campina Grande
- In office 1 January 1989 – 1 February 1995
- Constituency: At-large

Personal details
- Born: 21 September 1963 (age 63) Campina Grande, Paraíba, Brazil
- Party: PSB (1988–1992); PST (1992–1994); PDT (1994–2006); PMDB (2006–2014)
- Education: Federal University of Paraíba; State University of Paraíba

Vital do Rêgo Filho (born 21 September 1963) is a Brazilian politician and doctor. He represented Paraíba in the Federal Senate from 2011 to 2014. Previously, he was a Deputy from Paraíba from 2007 to 2011. He was a member of the Brazilian Democratic Movement Party. Assumed office in the Federal Court of Accounts on December 22, 2014, appointed by president Dilma Rousseff. In the Senate, senator Raimundo Lira took office in his place.

== Operation Car Wash ==
On May 19, 2016, minister Teori Zavascki ordered the opening of inquiry that investigates Vital do Rêgo Filho in Operation Car Wash for supposed payoff charges from contractors when, in office as senator, led the Parliamentary Committee of Inquiry of Petrobras in the Congress.

Legal offices
Preceded by José Jorge	Minister of the Federal Court of Accounts; 2014–present	Incumbent
Preceded by Bruno Dantas	President of the Federal Court of Accounts; 2025–present	Incumbent
Order of precedence
Preceded by Maria Elizabeth Rocha as President of the Superior Military Court	Brazilian order of precedence 33rd in line as President of the Federal Court of Accounts	Followed by Aloysio Corrêa da Veiga as President of the Superior Labour Court
