= Vinícius Marques de Carvalho =

Brazilian politician (born 1977)

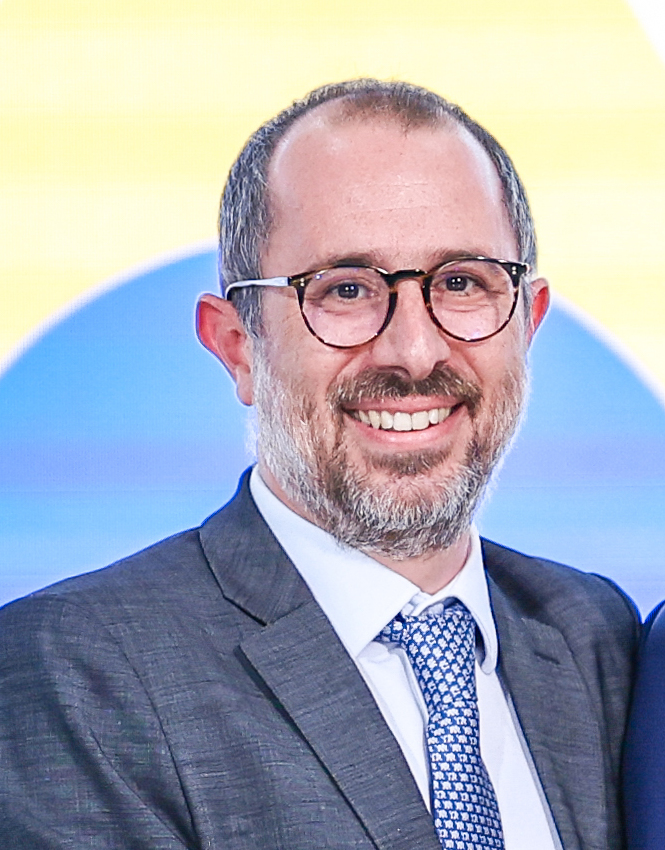
- Marques de Carvalho in 2023

Comptroller General
- Incumbent
- Assumed office 1 January 2023
- President: Luiz Inácio Lula da Silva
- Preceded by: Wagner de Campos Rosário

Personal details
- Born: 5 December 1977 (age 48)
- Party: Independent

Vinícius Marques de Carvalho (born 5 December 1977) is a Brazilian politician serving as comptroller general since 2023. From 2012 to 2016, he served as president of the Administrative Council for Economic Defense.
