= Wellington Lima e Silva =

Brazilian politician (born 1966)

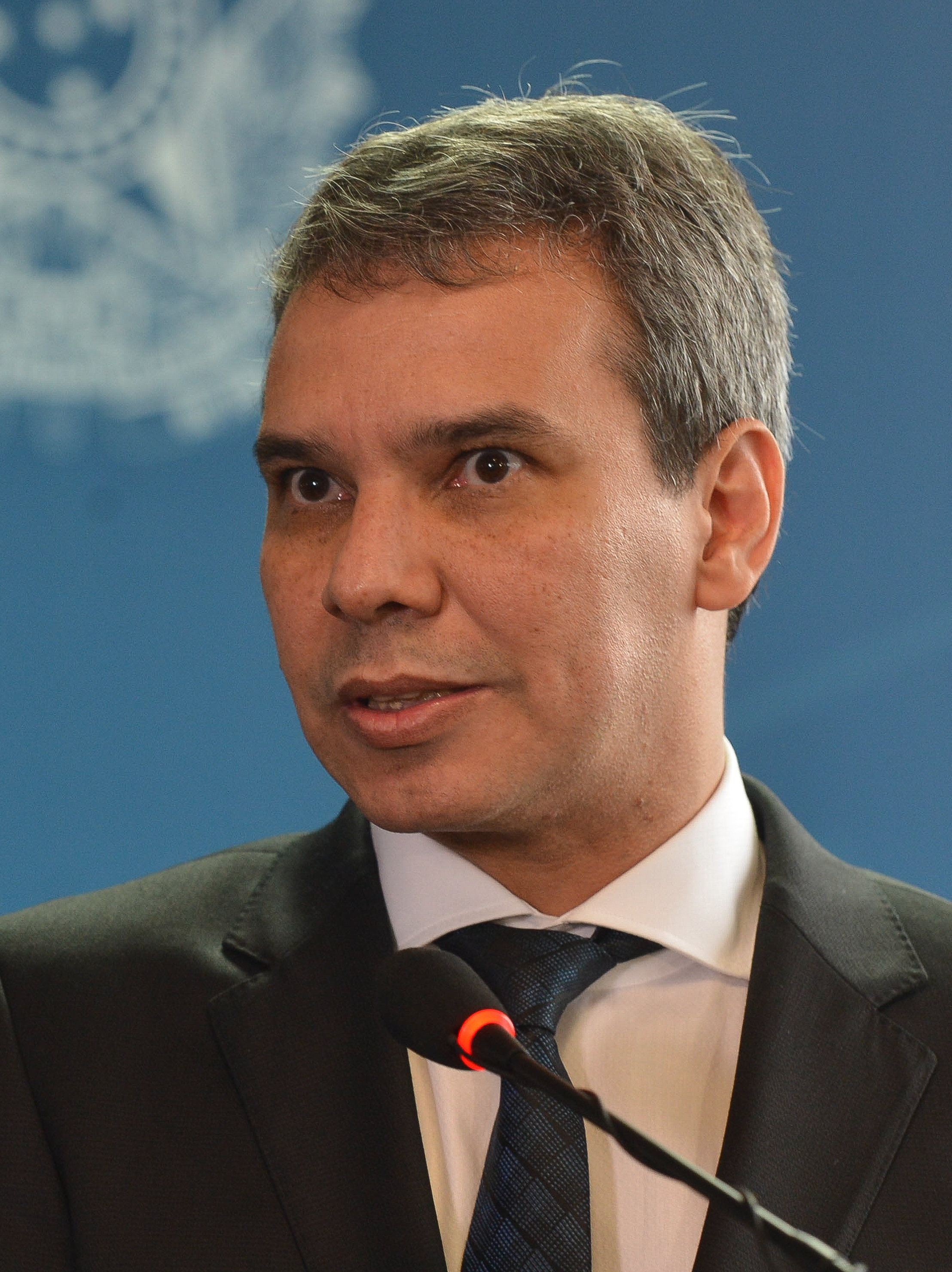
- Lima e Silva in 2016

Minister of Justice
- Incumbent
- Assumed office 15 January 2026
- President: Luiz Inácio Lula da Silva
- Preceded by: Ricardo Lewandowski
- In office 3 March 2016 – 14 March 2016
- President: Dilma Rousseff
- Preceded by: José Eduardo Cardozo
- Succeeded by: Eugênio Aragão

Personal details
- Born: 1966 (age 59–60)
- Party: Independent

Wellington César Lima e Silva (born 1966) is a Brazilian politician. He has served as minister of justice since 2026, having previously served from 3 to 14 March 2016. From 2024 to 2026, he served as general counsel of Petrobras. From 2010 to 2014, he served as prosecutor general of Bahia.

Political offices
Preceded by Ricardo Lewandowski	Minister of Justice and Public Security; 2026–present	Incumbent
