= José Eduardo Cardozo =

Brazilian lawyer and politician (born 1959)

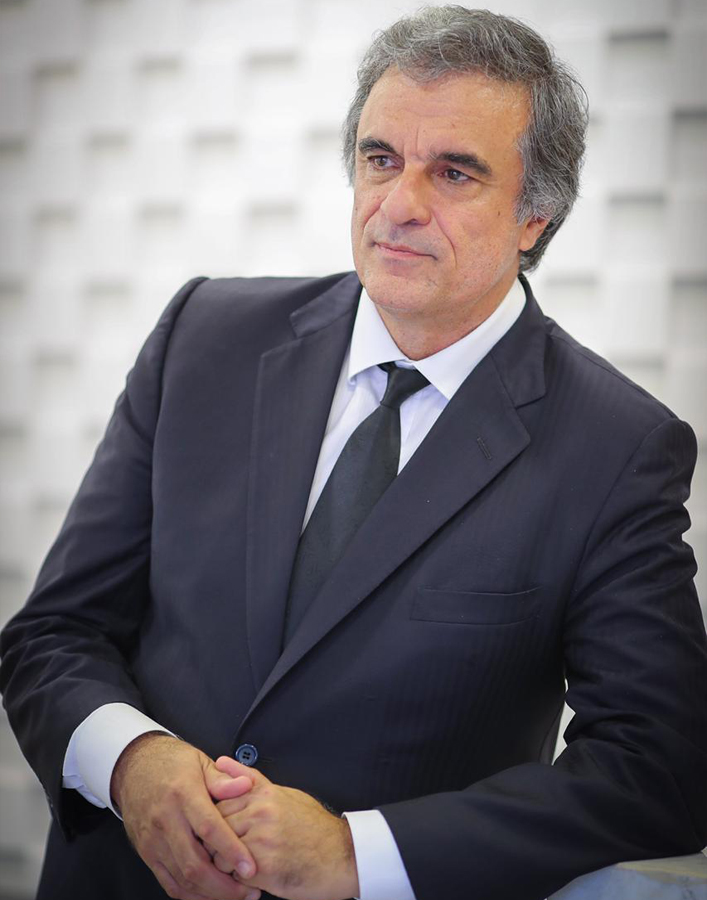

Attorney General of the Union
- In office 3 March 2016 – 12 May 2016
- President: Dilma Rousseff
- Preceded by: Luís Inácio Adams
- Succeeded by: Fábio Medina Osório

Minister of Justice and Citizenship
- In office 1 January 2011 – 3 March 2016
- President: Dilma Rousseff
- Preceded by: Luiz Paulo Barreto
- Succeeded by: Wellington Lima e Silva

Federal Deputy
- In office 1 February 2003 – 1 January 2011
- Constituency: São Paulo

Councillor of São Paulo
- In office 1 February 1995 – 1 February 2003
- Constituency: At-large

President of the Municipal Chamber of São Paulo
- In office 1 January 2001 – 1 January 2003
- Preceded by: Armando Mellão Neto
- Succeeded by: Arselino Tatto

Personal details
- Born: 18 April 1959 (age 67) São Paulo, Brazil
- Party: Workers' Party (1989–present)
- Education: Pontifical Catholic University of São Paulo
- Profession: Lawyer; professor

José Eduardo Cardozo (born 18 April 1959) is a Brazilian lawyer, politician, professor, and former Attorney General of Brazil who served as Minister of Justice from 2011 to 2016.

He ran unsuccessfully for the presidency of the Brazilian Workers' Party in 2009, finishing second behind José Eduardo Dutra. He taught at the Pontifical Catholic University of São Paulo. He is a São Paulo FC fan.

Political offices
Preceded by Armando Mellão Neto	President of the Municipal Chamber of São Paulo; 2001–2003	Succeeded by Arselino Tatto
Preceded by Luiz Paulo Barreto	Minister of Justice and Citizenship; 2011–2016	Succeeded by Wellington Lima e Silva
Preceded by Luís Inácio Adams	Attorney General of the Union; 2016	Succeeded by Fábio Medina Osório
