= Alexandre de Moraes =

Brazilian jurist and politician (born 1968)

His Excellency Alexandre de Moraes
- Moraes in 2026

Justice of the Supreme Federal Court
- Incumbent
- Assumed office 22 March 2017
- Appointed by: Michel Temer
- Preceded by: Teori Zavascki

President of the Superior Electoral Court
- In office 16 August 2022 – 3 June 2024
- Vice President: Ricardo Lewandowski
- Preceded by: Edson Fachin
- Succeeded by: Cármen Lúcia

Minister of Justice and Citizenship
- In office 12 May 2016 – 22 February 2017 (Note: Discharged from 7 February 2017 to 22 February 2017)
- President: Michel Temer
- Preceded by: Eugênio Aragão
- Succeeded by: José Levi do Amaral (acting)

Other judicial positions
- 2025–: Vice President of the Supreme Federal Court
- 2022: Vice President of the Superior Electoral Court
- 2020–2024: Effective Justice of the Superior Electoral Court
- 2017–2020: Substitute Justice of the Superior Electoral Court
- 2005–2007: Counselor of the National Justice Council

Other political positions
- 2015–2016: Secretary of Public Security of the State of São Paulo
- 2007–2010: Secretary of Transports of the Municipality of São Paulo
- 2002–2005: Secretary of Justice of the State of São Paulo

Personal details
- Born: 13 December 1968 (age 57) São Paulo, São Paulo, Brazil
- Party: Brazilian Social Democracy Party (PSDB) (2015–2017)
- Spouse: Viviane Barci de Moraes
- Education: University of São Paulo (LLB, PhD)

Alexandre de Moraes (Brazilian Portuguese: [aleˈʃɐ̃dɾi dʒi moˈɾajs]; born 13 December 1968) is a Brazilian jurist, former politician, former president of the Superior Electoral Court, and current justice of the Supreme Federal Court. Moraes was appointed to the Supreme Court by President Michel Temer in 2017 when serving as Minister of Justice and Public Security. Previously, Moraes had acted as Secretary for Public Security in the state of São Paulo and had been a member of the Brazilian Public Prosecutor's Office.

Moraes's tenure as president of Brazil's Superior Electoral Court and certain actions he took during the 2022 Brazilian general election have made him the target of criticism by Bolsonaro's camp. After the 2023 Brazilian Congress attack, Moraes ordered several controversial judicial actions, facing criticism for combining investigative and judicial functions against alleged coup planners, authorizing preventive detentions, ordering several arrests, search warrants, and terminations of social media accounts of individuals and groups accused of helping plan coups and propagating fake news, in addition to ordering content removal and brief nationwide blocks of widely used platforms that had failed to comply with Brazilian court orders, such as Telegram and Twitter.

Moraes's actions following the 2022 election generated extensive debates about impartiality and legality and raising concerns about freedom of speech and the limits of judicial power. Critics argued that his measures are authoritarian, unconstitutional, and partisan, while supporters said they are legal and necessary to maintain Brazil's democratic rule, preventing coups and the rise of extremism. Among Moraes's supporters is the current president of Brazil Luiz Inácio Lula da Silva, and among his critics is the former president Jair Bolsonaro, American president Donald Trump, and Elon Musk.

In July 2025, the US State Department imposed an entry ban on Moraes and other Supreme Court justices, alleging "political persecution against Jair Bolsonaro" and violations of the basic rights of Brazilians and Americans. Later that month, the US Treasury Department imposed economic sanctions under the Magnitsky Act on Moraes, although he has no accounts, investments or assets in the United States. Moraes said he would ignore the Magnitsky procedure and that he would remain the rapporteur of the criminal case regarding the coup d'état attempt in Brazil. On 12 December, the Trump administration removed the Magnitsky sanctions on Moraes and his wife. That same year, the Financial Times included Moraes in its list of the 25 most influential people in the world, in the "Heroes" category.

In September 2026, a report by the Federal Police of Brazil released as part of the Banco Master case revealed messages and other records indicating a close relationship between Moraes and former banker Daniel Vorcaro. The report included conversations related to investigations into the bank and professional relations with the law firm of Moraes's wife. The revelations prompted questions about a possible conflict of interest and Moraes's conduct, although he was not identified in the report as being formally investigated for a crime, while Justice André Mendonça, who is overseeing the case at the Supreme Court, considers the possible developments arising from the investigation. Since then, news organizations including O Estado de S. Paulo, O Globo and Folha de S.Paulo published editorials between September 1 and 2 calling for Moraes to leave the Supreme Federal Court, either through resignation, removal by the court's plenary, or impeachment proceedings initiated by the Federal Senate. As of September 3, 2026, 55 new impeachment petitions had been filed with the Federal Senate against the justice.

== Early life ==
Alexandre de Moraes studied at the Law School of the University of São Paulo (USP), graduating in 1990. Moraes is an associate professor of the Law School, and has also taught electoral law at Mackenzie Presbyterian University. He received a doctorate in State Law from the same university under the supervision of professor Dalmo Dallari, with a thesis on constitutional jurisdiction.

== Career ==
Moraes was a member of the Brazilian Social Democracy Party (PSDB). In 2002, he was appointed Secretary of Public Security of the State of São Paulo. His management was controversial: he was accused of covering up police violence. One out of every four homicides in the city of São Paulo was committed by the police. In addition, Moraes sent armoured vehicles to suppress left-wing demonstrations.

At the beginning of 2016, he was called upon by Michel Temer. The latter was living under the threat of a hacker who had hacked into the cell phone of his wife, Marcela Temer, and demanded 300,000 reais under penalty of releasing compromising information and photos. Alexandre de Moraes quickly mobilized his police force, assembled a team of 33 investigators and arrested the blackmailer.

Moraes assumed office on 22 March 2017. As minister, he claims to defend a policy of "zero tolerance". He denounced the alleged "criminal attitudes" of leftist movements and justified police violence. He was at the centre of another controversy when the Brazilian newspaper Estadão published an investigation claiming that he had intervened to defend the Transcooper cooperative, suspected of being linked to Brazil's main drug trafficking group, the First Command of the Capital (PCC), which he denied.

On 10 June 2020, Moraes – in response to a legal challenge from three political parties – said the health ministry must "fully re-establish the daily divulgation of epidemiological data on the Covid-19 pandemic", including on its website: "Mr Moraes gave President Jair Bolsonaro's government 48 hours to release the full figures again."

On 16 August 2022, Moraes was elected as the presiding justice of the Superior Electoral Court in a public ceremony with 2,000 guests at the court auditorium. The justice Ricardo Lewandowski took place as his vice-president on duty.

=== 2020 Brazil judiciary fake news inquiry ===
In April 2019, Supreme Federal Court president Dias Toffoli, a former legal representative for the Workers' Party (PT) in the presidential campaigns of Luiz Inácio Lula da Silva in 1998, 2002 and 2006, launched an inquiry to investigate personal attacks and statements against court members. Moraes was chosen as its rapporteur. That month, Crusoé magazine reported that a document from Operation Car Wash revealed that then-Solicitor General Toffoli was also involved in the Odebrecht scandal, according to the company's former chairman Marcelo Odebrecht. On 15 April, Moraes ordered that Crusoé take down the article from their website. Toffoli himself later requested a probe into whether Crusoé illegally leaked the document. The Court's decision on the matter was criticized by outlets such as The Intercept on the basis of censorship and attack on the freedom of the press. On 27 May 2020, as part of that same inquiry, the Federal Police launched an operation probing businessmen, bloggers and politicians allied to President Jair Bolsonaro.

On 19 March 2022, Moraes ordered the suspension of the messaging app Telegram, accusing it of repeatedly failing to block accounts spreading disinformation, and ignoring previous court decisions. President Bolsonaro called the ruling "inadmissible", while Telegram founder Pavel Durov blamed the company's failings on email issues, pledging to do a better job.

In October 2022, the Superior Electoral Court gave Moraes the unilateral authority to order the removal of online content that did not comply with previous TSE rulings, as part of an effort to combat disinformation. Bolsonaro supporters and legal experts criticized the move, fearing that it could allow for censorship. Moraes cited the proliferation of false information and hate speech when initially proposing the move to the Superior Electoral Court.

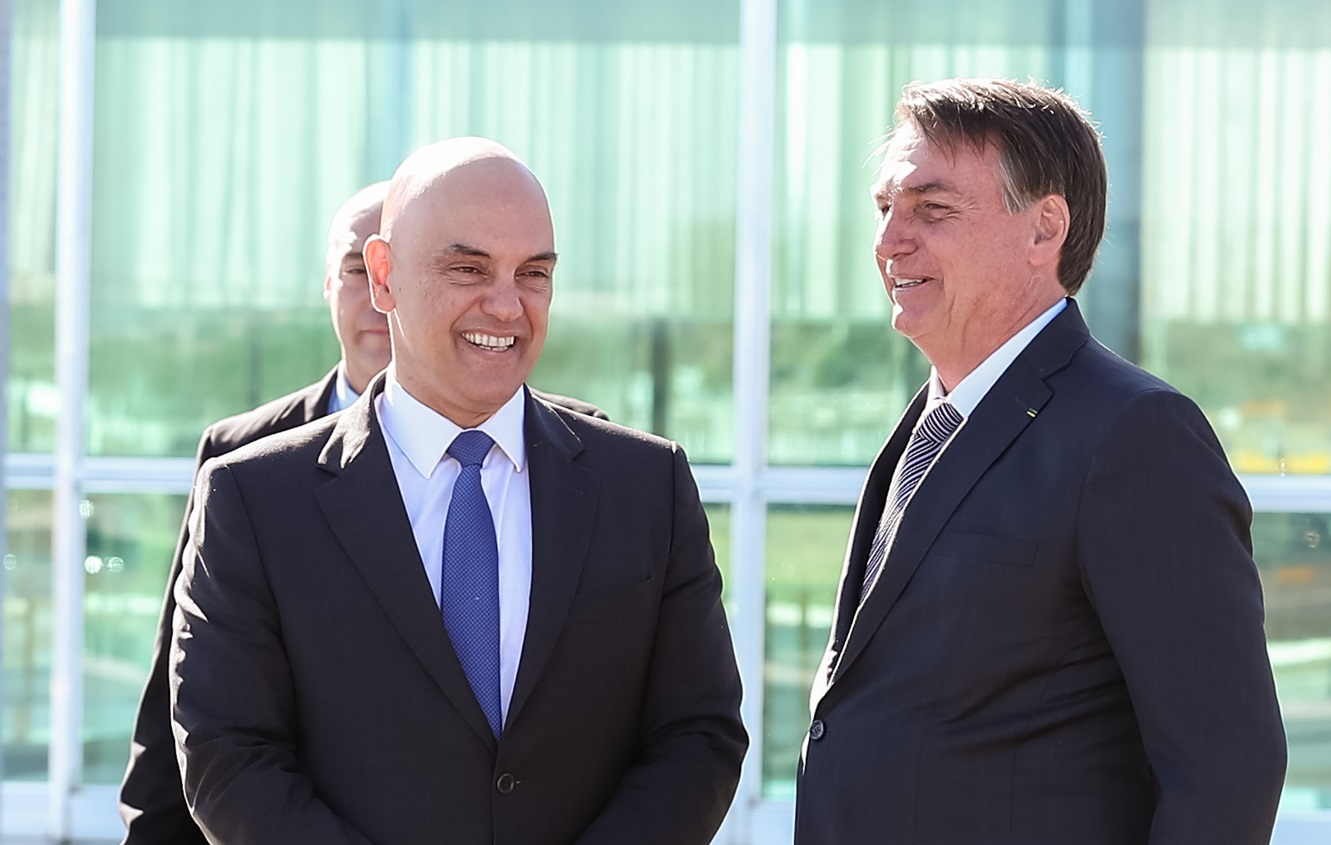
Moraes and former President Jair Bolsonaro in 2019

On 30 October 2022, during the second round of the presidential election between Bolsonaro and Lula da Silva, hundreds of roadblocks set up by the Federal Highway Police (PRF), under orders from the government, prevented voters from going to the polls in Northeastern Brazil. Moraes summoned the director of the PRF, Silvinei Vasques, and threatened him with imprisonment if he did not lift the blockades.

=== 8 January 2023 attacks in Brasília ===
Shortly after the 8 January 2023 attacks in Brasília, Moraes ordered the arrest of the former commander of the Military Police of the Federal District, Fabio Augusto Vieira, the former secretary of Public Security of the Federal District and former Justice Minister, Anderson Torres, and enacted a federal interference for the removal of the Governor of the Federal District Ibaneis Rocha.

==== Criticism ====
Several right-wing and far-right politicians, members of the private sector, supporters of former president Jair Bolsonaro and the right-wing media accused Moraes of practicing nepotism, political interference, political repression, abuse of power and deploying a constitutional dictatorship. American journalist and lawyer Glenn Greenwald has criticized several decisions of Moraes, accusing him of censorship and undermining freedom of speech.

Twitter owner Elon Musk, responding to Greenwald on Twitter, said Moraes's moves were "extremely concerning", while Beatriz Rey, a political scientist at the State University of Rio de Janeiro, said Moraes's approach, while not ideal, was necessary because other branches of government, especially the legislature, had not done their duty. Milly Lacombe, in her column on the news website UOL, added that such concerns ignored a greater danger, evidenced by the protests and a failed attack on Lula's inauguration. And she argued that the far-right poses serious dangers to Brazilian democracy, which should overshadow concerns about freedom of expression or interference by the judiciary. "Moraes acts within the law. He does not act outside his powers as a minister, he does not tear up the constitution, he does not do so under criticism from his peers in the Supreme Court."

=== Twitter suspension in Brazil ===
In Brazilian law it is understood that freedom of expression cannot overlap with other rights; for example, media outlets cannot propagate racism, disseminate prejudice or violate people's privacy. The Brazilian Constitution provides that the freedom of one individual cannot harm that of another. Section X of article 5, for example, determines the protection of intimacy, privacy, honor and image of people.

In April 2024, X (formerly Twitter) owner Elon Musk accused Moraes of "brazenly and repeatedly betraying the constitution and people of Brazil" in response to the Supreme Federal Court's order to block several X accounts, arguing combat of digital militias. This in turn resulted in the Supreme Federal Court opening a criminal inquiry against Musk for spreading hate speech, encouragement of violence, data exposure and alleged obstruction of investigations. The exchange has elicited mixed reactions both from Brazilian politicians as well as international netizens. In August 2024, X's press service accused Moraes of threatening to arrest the social network's employees in Brazil for failing to comply with blocking orders. In response, X announced the closure of its representative office in the country. Elon Musk again lashed out at the judge and proposed impeaching him.

On 30 August 2024, X was suspended nationwide for failing to follow the directive, and Moraes set a fine of 50,000 Brazilian reais (roughly $8,900 USD) per day for anyone using VPNs to access it. Shortly thereafter, X created the @AlexandreFiles account, purportedly in order to "reveal the unlawful directives issued to X by Alexandre de Moraes" and posted several allegedly illegal court requests that had made of X. On 2 September, the Supreme Court of Brazil upheld the ruling by Moraes.

Days later, Musk attempted to circumvent the X suspension by migrating part of his operations to computers from the company CloudFlare and others that offer a service called reverse proxy. He said he did so because "the X blockade in Brazil harmed service to other Latin American countries and that the return of availability for Brazilians was an 'unforeseen' side effect." However, the National Telecommunications Agency (Anatel) denied this and stated that "the change in servers indicates 'deliberate intent to disregard the STF order.'" On 20 September, Musk backed down, lowered his tone against the Brazilian justice system and accepted the decision to appoint a legal representative in Brazil.

According to Moraes, social media has been a major catalyst for harmful speech, whether it be fake news or an attack on the [judicial/political] system. Through these platforms, extremist groups have been found in "bubbles" to spread hate and attack democratic instruments:

"An extremist populism, mainly from the far-right, that has learned from the strategic mistakes of the Nazi and fascist regimes and, instead of attacking the system, has been corroding it from within. Instead of saying that democracy is bad, it says that the instruments are being rigged. Instead of saying that freedom of the press is bad, it says that it defends [the press], but that the media is distorting freedom of expression [...] People who were ashamed of making racist jokes now see social media as a racist social bubble, and they are now proud. They are cowards in real life and brave on social media. What made this possible? These issues linked to the flaws of democracy, especially the issue of income distribution". He concluded that the excessive concentration of income in the hands of a few, together with an economic crisis in several sectors, and enhanced by [social] networks, would have encouraged attacks on democracy.

=== Trump administration sanctions ===
I understand that for American culture it is harder to grasp the fragility of democracy because there has never been a coup there. [...] But Brazil had years of dictatorship under [President Getúlio] Vargas, another 20 years of military dictatorship and innumerable coup attempts. When you're much more attacked by a disease, you form tougher antibodies, and you seek out a preventive vaccine.

— Justice Moraes to The Washington Post

On 18 July 2025, after authorizing an operation against Jair Bolsonaro, who was required to wear an electronic tag and be confined to his home at night and on weekends, Alexandre de Moraes was attacked by the Trump administration over his visa. The decision was announced by Secretary of State Marco Rubio and would have consequences for Moraes's family and "allies". According to Rubio, "the political prosecution of Brazilian judge Alexandre de Moraes against Jair Bolsonaro has created a complex of persecution and censorship so widespread that it not only violates the fundamental rights of Brazilians, but also transcends Brazil's borders and targets Americans." The American diplomat concluded the text by stating that he "ordered the immediate suspension of the visas of Alexandre de Moraes and his allies, as well as those of their immediate family members."

On 30 July 2025, Moraes was added to the sanctions list established by the US government under the Magnitsky Act, despite the fact that he has no accounts, investments, or assets in the US. As a result, the minister might even have difficulty receiving his salary, despite being paid by Banco do Brasil. Despite being a Brazilian institution, the bank maintains operational and financial ties to the international system, which could lead to certain services being restricted to avoid fines.

The leader of the campaign for the passage of the Magnitsky Act, Bill Browder, criticized the sanction against Moraes, calling it a "shameful moment" and stating the judge does not fit the criteria for such a measure, and claimed that the situation is the "first clear abuse" of Magnitsky. Browder argued Trump was attempting to address domestic political issues through legislation, while ignoring that the Magnitsky Act was meant to punish human rights abuses. Transparency International also criticized the application of the Magnitsky Act to Moraes, calling it "alarming and unacceptable", viewing it as politically motivated and warning of the risk of institutional instability in Brazil due to such "interference by a foreign government" that disrespects "national sovereignty and the separation of powers". The American non-governmental organization Human Rights First stated the enforcement of the Magnitsky Act shows Trump is seeking "impunity for close political allies"; according to a senior director of the organization, Trump would be willing to start a trade war and other "extreme" measures to protect Bolsonaro from proceedings related to the 8 January coup d'état attempt.

British magazine The Economist criticized the American decision, stating they were overreacting and highlighting the unprecedented nature of applying the Magnitsky Act in this case, arguing that it could backfire. According to the article, the measure would strengthen Luiz Inácio Lula da Silva's narrative that Bolsonaro and his allies are "traitors" to the nation. The Economist also noted Moraes acts within Brazilian law and portrayed the justice as "unshakable" in the face of pressure—having flown to São Paulo to watch a match of his team on the very same day the sanctions were announced. According to Fundação Getulio Vargas researcher and Ibmec professor Leonardo Paz Neves, the sanction against Moraes was a strategy by Trump to once again avoid the expression "Trump Always Chickens Out", since on the same day a decree was published listing nearly 700 items exempted from the tariff hike on Brazilian goods.

On 1 August, during the reopening session of the Supreme Federal Court, Moraes declared the Magnitsky Act would be ignored in his case and that he would remain the rapporteur of the criminal case regarding the coup d'état attempt in Brazil. Justices Luís Roberto Barroso and Gilmar Mendes also criticized the sanction and defended their colleague. Moraes stated that "pseudo-patriotic Brazilians" act "in a cowardly and treacherous manner" with the aim of subjecting the functioning of the Supreme Court "to the scrutiny of a foreign state", adding that these individuals "think they are dealing with people of their own kind, also militia members". On 4 August, justice Edson Fachin declared the application of the Magnitsky Act represents "undue interference" and a "threat" to judicial independence.

In an interview to The Washington Post, Moraes said: "we'll do what's right" and expressed his admiration for the constitutional history of the United States, but remained firm in upholding judicial decisions. He defends the legitimacy of his actions, stating that there is no need for adjustments in his conduct or in the way he carries out his work, and argued that the "accelerated pace of certain processes", such as the criminal action involving the coup plot, is justified by the presence of defendants in prison.

On 28 August, The Economist praised the Brazilian judiciary's performance in the Jair Bolsonaro case and highlighted the Donald Trump administration's numerous recent actions against Brazil in an attempt to free the "Trump of the Tropics" (Bolsonaro) from prosecution. Among the actions against the country, the newspaper highlighted the imposition of 50% tariffs on Brazilian products and the application of the Magnitsky Act against Minister Alexandre de Moraes. It concluded:

"Brazil offers a lesson in democracy for an America that is becoming more corrupt, protectionist, and authoritarian. [...] This recalls an ugly bygone era when the United States habitually destabilised Latin American countries. Fortunately, Mr Trump's interference is likely to backfire. [...] Unlike their counterparts in the United States, many of Brazil's mainstream politicians from all parties want to play by the rules and make progress through reform. Those are the hallmarks of political maturity. Temporarily at least, the role of the Western hemisphere's democratic adult has moved south."

On 12 December 2025, the US government lifted the sanctions it placed on Moraes and his wife.

==== United States Department of State report ====
On 12 August 2025, the Trump administration stated that the human rights situation in Brazil had deteriorated and accused the Judiciary of adopting measures that would undermine freedom of expression. Published by the United States Department of State, the report—which assesses the human rights situation worldwide—specifically named justice Alexandre de Moraes: "Court records reveal that he personally ordered the suspension of more than 100 user accounts on the social media platform X (formerly Twitter), disproportionately suppressing the speech of supporters of former president Jair Bolsonaro, instead of adopting narrower measures to penalize content that incited imminent illegal action or harassment".

The same report, which also mentioned a deterioration of human rights in South Africa, ignored the anti-democratic efforts of Hungary's government, omitted the humanitarian crisis in the Gaza Strip caused by Israel, and softened its tone on Nayib Bukele's El Salvador, ignoring accusations of human rights violations in that country. Critics claimed it was politically motivated; among them, former Department of State official Josh Paul, who noted that the document "demonstrates what happens when political agendas take precedence over facts". The previous year's report had found no significant changes in the human rights situation in either Brazil or South Africa. Established democracies in Europe were also criticized in this report by the Trump administration; according to the document, France and Germany had "credible reports of serious restrictions on freedom of expression".

The non-governmental organization Human Rights Watch accused the United States government of political manipulation and lies in the document; according to the organization, by ignoring violations in allied countries, there was an "exercise in cover-up and deception", turning the report into "a weapon that makes autocrats appear palatable and downplays the abuses that occur in those places". Human Rights Watch considered that the 2025 edition of the document undermined its credibility, also accusing Trump of manipulation in the case of Brazil.

== Banco Master case ==
In 2025 and 2026, Justice Alexandre de Moraes came under scrutiny in connection with the Banco Master case. Reports indicated that the law firm of his wife, Viviane Barci de Moraes, had signed a contract with Banco Master valued at approximately R$129 million over a multi-year period. According to media reports and information presented to a Brazilian Senate parliamentary inquiry commission (CPI), the firm received tens of millions of reais in payments between 2024 and 2025. The case raised concerns among commentators about potential conflicts of interest, given Moraes' position on the Supreme Federal Court. Separately, investigations involving Banco Master have included allegations of financial crimes and corruption, though no charges have been brought against Moraes. Moraes and his wife's law firm have denied any wrongdoing.

=== Relationship with Daniel Vorcaro ===
In September 2026, information was released concerning the relationship between Supreme Federal Court (STF) Justice Alexandre de Moraes and banker Daniel Vorcaro, then the controlling shareholder of Banco Master. The information came primarily from the analysis by the Federal Police (PF) of data extracted from mobile phones seized from Vorcaro as part of Operation Compliance Zero, which was investigating suspected fraud involving the bank. On September 1, Justice André Mendonça, the rapporteur of proceedings related to the case before the STF, ordered the lifting of the confidentiality of a police report containing messages, records of meetings, document metadata and other material concerning Vorcaro's relations with public officials.

According to the report, contact between Vorcaro and Moraes began in late 2023 after former Communications Minister Fábio Faria provided the banker with Moraes's telephone number. The PF identified at least six meetings between them in 2024 and 2025.

Some of the recovered messages record contacts between Vorcaro and an interlocutor identified by the PF as Moraes during the period preceding Vorcaro's arrest in November 2025. On October 30, Vorcaro reportedly asked that the director-general of the Federal Police, Andrei Rodrigues, and the Attorney General of the Republic, Paulo Gonet, be contacted because of the investigations involving Banco Master. On November 15, two days before his arrest, he reportedly asked whether he should leave the country. The PF stated, however, that it was able to recover messages sent by Vorcaro but not any replies from Moraes, because the communications had been forwarded as screenshots of notes through WhatsApp's view-once feature, making it difficult to recover their contents from Vorcaro's device.

The report also recorded messages concerning the organization of legal events in London sponsored or organized by Vorcaro. In one of them, the banker stated that the guest list should be approved in advance by Moraes, while in another he referred to the participation of lawyer Viviane Barci de Moraes, the justice's wife, in changes to the program. The information also concerned the hiring of Barci de Moraes's law firm by Banco Master. The contract, signed in 2024, provided for monthly payments of R$3.5 million, totaling approximately R$129 million over three years. According to the firm, the services were provided between February 2024 and November 2025, during which 94 working meetings were held and legal opinions were prepared.

According to the PF's analysis, metadata from the electronic version of the contract indicated that one of its final modifications was made on January 15, 2024, by a user identified as "Ministro Alexandre de Moraes". The law firm confirmed that Moraes had access to the document, but stated that its compliance department had consulted him, in his capacity as the managing partner's husband, to determine whether there were any legal impediments to the hiring. According to the firm, there was no provision for Moraes to act in proceedings involving Banco Master and the services were actually performed. The PF also found documents relating to a second proposed contract involving a company linked to Vorcaro and Viviane's law firm, worth up to R$50 million. The document provided, among other conditions, for the transfer of interests related to an airplane and a helicopter. The law firm stated that the proposal was not accepted and that it did not replace the original contract.

The new information was released following a controversy in March 2026, when screenshots were published that allegedly indicated a conversation between Vorcaro and Moraes on the day of the banker's first arrest, November 17, 2025. Moraes denied having had that conversation, and the STF stated, based on an analysis of the data then presented, that the messages were associated with other contacts in Vorcaro's address book rather than with the justice's telephone. The material released in September included additional elements, such as messages preceding the arrest, records of meetings and document metadata; however, the replies attributed to Moraes were not included in the material recovered by the PF.

The release of the report raised questions about Moraes's relationship with Vorcaro and about a possible conflict between that relationship, the hiring of his wife's law firm and the impartiality requirements applicable to judicial office. The disclosed material nevertheless remained subject to investigation and institutional controversy and did not, by itself, constitute definitive evidence of unlawful interference by Moraes in the investigations into Banco Master or of criminal conduct.

On September 1, Attorney General of the Republic Paulo Gonet argued that the proceedings that resulted in the PF report should be declared null, while Mendonça argued that the matter should be submitted to the STF plenary. Gonet argued that Mendonça could not, without prior action by the Public Prosecutor's Office or authorization from the STF plenary, order investigative measures aimed at investigating another justice of the Court, stating that "a judge cannot accuse, much less conduct pre-trial investigations".

The Attorney General's Office also argued that an investigative order directed at specific public officials, without a request from the Public Prosecutor's Office or an initiative by the PF, would be invalid because it exceeded judicial authority during the pre-trial stage. The position was taken despite the report also containing references to Gonet and members of his family circle, including references to his participation in an event in London sponsored by Banco Master. Gonet requested that the entire proceeding be declared null, rather than only the elements concerning him. Mendonça, in turn, referred the matter to STF president Edson Fachin for consideration by the full court. On September 2, Fachin stated that the high authority held by the justices imposed "duties, limits and responsibilities" and that he would take the appropriate institutional measures in light of the facts.

On September 1, 2026, Senator Damares Alves announced that she would seek to organize a shutdown of the Federal Senate, seeking the support of other senators so that no votes would be held in the chamber until requests for the impeachment of Justice Alexandre de Moraes were placed on the agenda. Newspapers including O Estado de S. Paulo, O Globo and Folha de S.Paulo published editorials between September 1 and 2 calling for Moraes to leave the Supreme Federal Court, whether through resignation, removal by the STF plenary or impeachment proceedings in the Federal Senate.

== Political views ==
Since becoming a member of the Superior Electoral Court, Moraes has refused to express his political opinions publicly. He was previously known for his conservative views on economic issues and his support for tougher methods in fighting crime. With Moraes, tougher decisions are also expected in relation to the prison system and drug consumption, in addition to more developed stances on public spending cuts. Carlos Velloso, a former president of the Supreme Federal Court, described Moraes as "a centrist jurist, neither too conservative nor too liberal. There are no excesses for any of these extremes."

== Personal life ==
Alexandre de Moraes and his wife Viviane Barci de Moraes in 2023

Moraes entered the legal field as a prosecutor in São Paulo in 1991 at the age of 23. A prep course teacher for civil service exams, he wrote his best-selling book Direito Constitucional (Constitutional Law) in 1997, now in its 33rd edition and distributed at universities. He completed his doctorate in State Law at the University of São Paulo (USP) in 2000 and became a professor there the following year.

Moraes is married to Viviane Barci de Moraes and has three children. He is Catholic. He has publicly expressed his support for Corinthians, a São Paulo football club.

== Notes ==
Legal offices
Preceded by Teori Zavascki	Justice of the Supreme Federal Court; 2017–present	Incumbent
Preceded by Edson Fachin	Vice President of the Superior Electoral Court; 2022	Succeeded by Ricardo Lewandowski
Preceded by Edson Fachin	President of the Superior Electoral Court; 2022–2024	Succeeded by Cármen Lúcia
Political offices
Preceded by Edson Luiz Vismona	Secretary of Justice of São Paulo; 2002–2005	Succeeded by Hédio Silva Júnior
Preceded by Fernando Grella Vieira	Secretary of Public Security of São Paulo; 2015–2016	Succeeded by Mágino Barbosa
Preceded by Eugênio Aragão	Minister of Justice and Public Security; 2016–2017	Succeeded by José Levi do Amaral; Acting
