= Grace Mendonça =

Brazilian lawyer (born 1968)

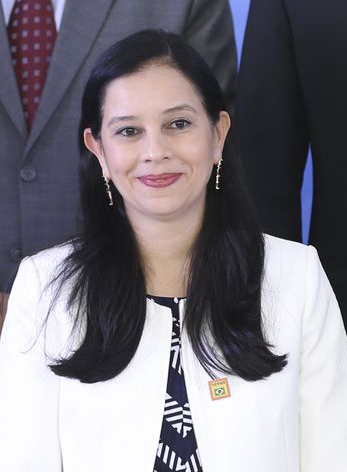

Attorney General of the Union
- In office 9 September 2016 – 31 December 2018
- President: Michel Temer
- Preceded by: Fábio Medina Osório
- Succeeded by: André Mendonça

Personal details
- Born: Grace Maria Fernandes Mendonça; 17 October 1968 (age 57) Januária, Minas Gerais, Brazil
- Party: PSDB (1997–present)
- Children: 3
- Education: University Center of Brasília (UniCEUB); Brasiliense Institute of Public Law (IDP)
- Occupation: Lawyer, university professor

Grace Maria Fernandes Mendonça (born 17 October 1968 in Januária) is a Brazilian lawyer, university professor and former Attorney General of Brazil, appointed by president Michel Temer after the resignation of Fábio Medina Osório.

== Biography ==
Mendonça obtained a Bachelor's degree in Law, specialising in Civil Procedural Law from the Unified Teaching Association of the Federal District and a Master's Degree in Constitutional Law.

Prior joining the AGU, she was the advisor to the Deputy Attorney General of the Republic from 1995 to 2001 and a lawyer at the Companhia Imobiliária de Brasilia (TERRACAP). She was a member of Attorney General of the Union (AGU) board of directors since 2001. In 2002, she served as the Deputy Attorney General and General Coordinator of the Office of the Advocate General of the Union. She was also a senior lecturer in Constitutional Law, Civil Procedure and Administrative Law at the Universidade Católica de Brasília between 2002 and 2015.

== Career ==
She is to attend the WHO conference in Geneva, Switzerland.

Political offices
Preceded by Fábio Medina Osório	Attorney General of the Union; 2016–2018	Succeeded by André Luiz Mendonça
