= Ministry of Transparency, Supervision and Control =

Brazilian government ministry

Ministry overview
- Formed: 12 May 2016
- Preceding Ministry: Comptroller General of Brazil
- Headquarters: Brasília, Distrito Federal
- Minister responsible: Torquato Jardim
- Website: www.cgu.gov.br

The Ministry of Transparency, Supervision and Control (Portuguese: Ministério da Transparência, Fiscalização e Controle) is a cabinet-level federal ministry created on May 12, 2016. The then acting president of Brazil, Michel Temer, created the ministry under Provisional Measure 726/2016. The responsibilities of the former Comptroller General of Brazil were transferred to the ministry. Fabiano Silveira, its first minister, resigned on May 30, 2016. From May 30 to June 1, Carlos Higino was the interim minister, and on June 1, Torquato Jardim was installed as the new Transparency Minister.
