= Wagner de Campos Rosário =

Brazilian politician

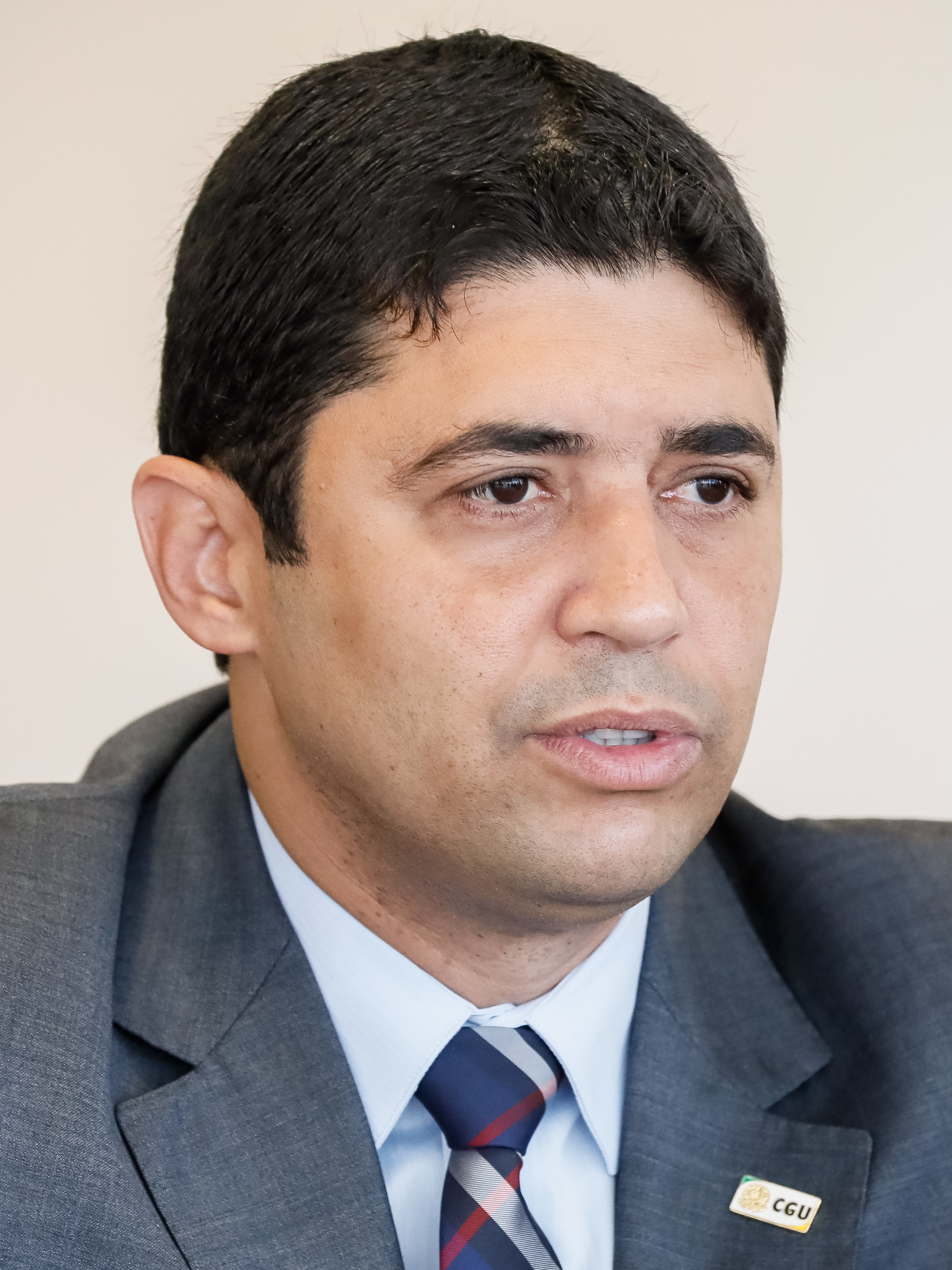
- Rosário in July 2019

Comptroller General of the Union
- In office 31 May 2017 – 31 December 2022
- President: Michel Temer; Jair Bolsonaro
- Preceded by: Torquato Jardim
- Succeeded by: Vinícius Marques de Carvalho

Personal details
- Education: Catholic University of Brasília; Universidad de Salamanca
- Occupation: Police officer

Military service
- Allegiance: Brazil
- Branch/service: Brazilian Army
- Rank: Captain

Wagner de Campos Rosário (Juiz de Fora) is a Brazilian politician. He served as Brazilian Minister of Transparency, Supervision and Control, from 2017 to 2022, having temporarily assumed the post after the resignation of Torquato Jardim and the refusal of Osmar Serraglio, and became effective thereafter. On November 20, 2018, President-elect Jair Bolsonaro stated that Wagner Campos will remain in the ministry. Rosário served as a career servant at the Ministry of Transparency, Supervision and Control and, from August 2016 until March 2017, he was executive secretary of the pulp. He was also captain of the Army.

== Career ==
After graduating with a master's degree in the fight against Corruption and Rule of Law by the University of Salamanca (2016) and Physical Education by the Catholic University of Brasília (2003), Rosario holds a postgraduate degree in Military Sciences from the Military Academy of Agulhas Negras (1996) and the Army Officers' Improvement School (2004). He also holds a post-graduate degree in Exercise Physiology from the Gama Filho University (2003), and has also graduated in Physical Education from the School of Physical Education of the Army (2000). Experience in the area of Combat and prevention of corruption, with emphasis in administrative investigation and joint investigations with the other organs of defense of the State, in cases of corruption and fraud.

He assumed the position of Ministry of Transparency, Supervision and Control of the Brazilian Union on May 31, 2017, with the exoneration of the holder Torquato Jardim, who assumed the Ministry of Justice

Political offices
| Preceded by Torquato Jardim | Comptroller General of the Union; 2017–2022 | Succeeded by Vinícius Marques de Carvalho |
