= Vinicius Lummertz =

Brazilian political scientist, former minister of tourism

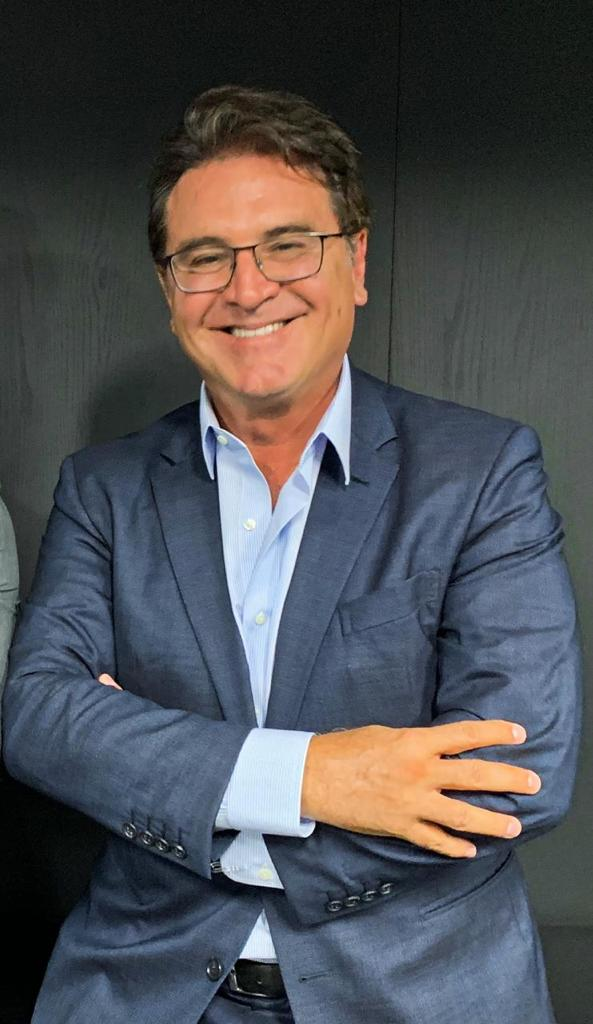

Minister of Tourism
- In office April 10, 2018 – December 31, 2018
- President: Michel Temer
- Preceded by: Marx Beltrão
- Succeeded by: Marcelo Álvaro Antônio

Personal details
- Born: 1960 (age 65–66) Rio do Sul, Santa Catarina, Brazil
- Party: PSDB
- Education: American University of Paris

Vinicius Lummertz (born in Rio do Sul in 1960) is a Brazilian politician and former Minister of Tourism of Brazil.

== Biography ==
Vinicius Lummertz is former Minister of Tourism of Brazil.

He holds a degree in Political Science from the American University of Paris, completed executive management courses at Harvard University's Kennedy School and the IMD in Lausanne (Switzerland), and achieved his A-Levels in Politics, Government, and Economics at D’Overbroeck’s College in Oxford.

Currently, he serves as Chairman of the Board of Directors at Grupo Wish and is a co-owner of LG17 Consulting.

He was the State Secretary of Tourism and Travel for the Government of São Paulo from January 2019 to December 2022.

He served as Minister of Tourism under President Michel Temer's administration, President of Embratur from 2015 to 2018, and National Secretary of Tourism Policies at the Ministry of Tourism from September 2012 to May 2015.

He was also Secretary of Planning, Budget, and Management under Governor Luis Henrique da Silveira in Santa Catarina, where he also held the position of Secretary of International Articulation.

He founded and presided over the State PPP and Concessions Company of Santa Catarina, served as Technical Director of Sebrae Nacional during President Fernando Henrique Cardoso’s administration.

He is currently the first Brazilian fellow of the Milken Institute, a global think tank based in Los Angeles, California. He is a founding member of the Alliance of Tourism Municipalities of the Silk Road, headquartered in Beijing, and Head of Tourism for Lide Emirates.

As an author, he has contributed to various newspapers over the years, including HuffPost in Washington. He is the author of books such as 'Complexo Brazil, o difícil é fazer' and 'Brasil, Potência Mundial do Turismo'.
