= Luís Inácio Adams =

Brazilian lawyer (born 1965)

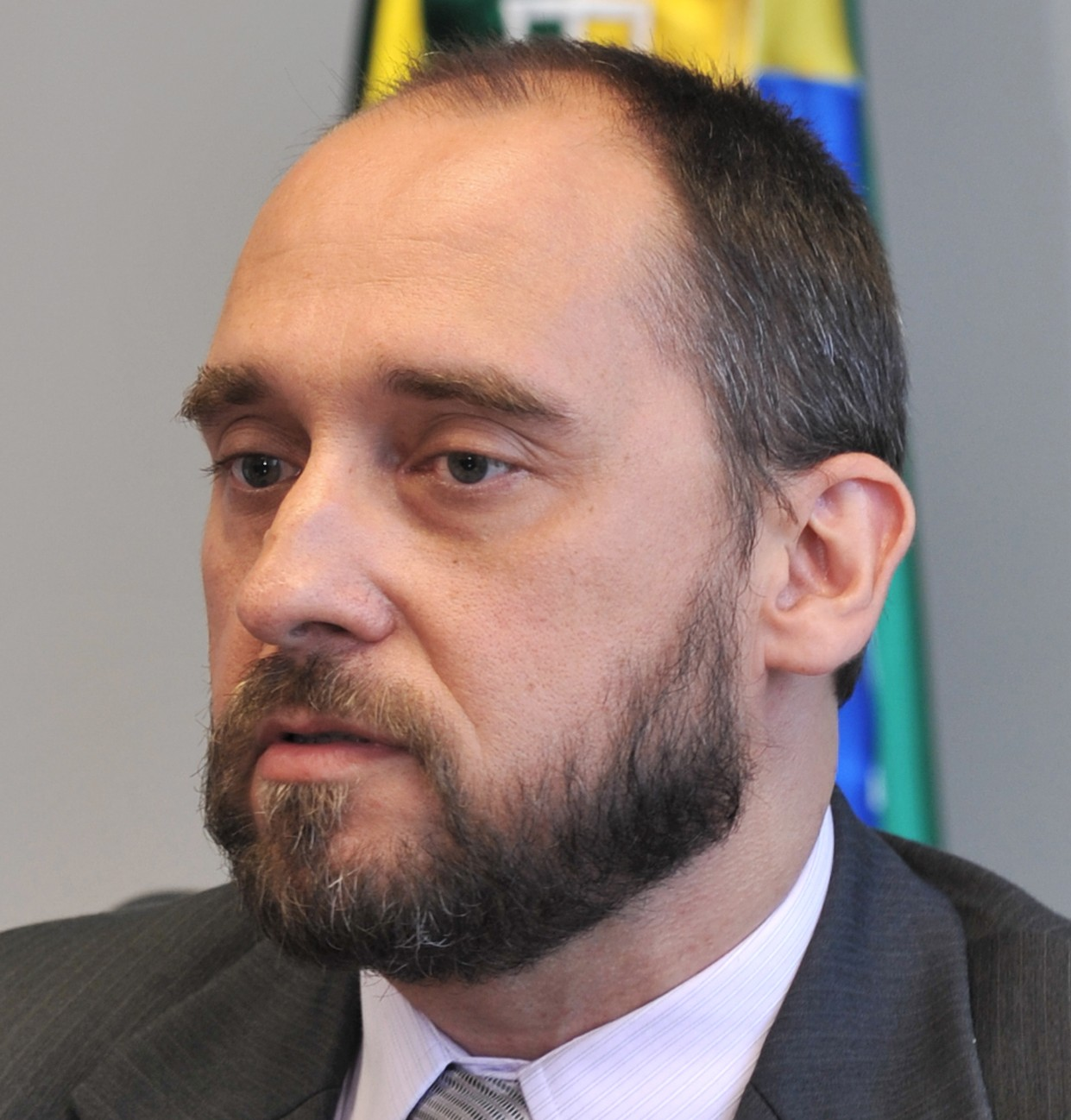

Attorney General of Brazil
- In office 23 October 2009 – 3 March 2016
- President: Luiz Inácio Lula da Silva; Dilma Rousseff
- Preceded by: Dias Toffoli
- Succeeded by: José Eduardo Cardozo

Personal details
- Born: 2 March 1965 (age 61) Porto Alegre, Rio Grande do Sul, Brazil

Luís Inácio Lucena Adams (born 2 March 1965) is a Brazilian lawyer who was appointed to be Brazil's Attorney General on 23 October 2009.

Adams earned his LL.B from the Faculty of Law of the Federal University of Rio Grande do Sul in Porto Alegre, the capital of the State of Rio Grande do Sul, and later pursued an LL.M. from the Faculty of Law of the Federal University of Santa Catarina, in Florianópolis, the capital of the State of Santa Catarina.

He was attorney for the National Treasury from 1993. In 2006, assumed leadership of the Attorney General of the Treasury. Both posts are held in Brasília, the capital of Brazil.

Political offices
Preceded by Dias Toffoli	Attorney General of the Union; 2009–2016	Succeeded by José Eduardo Cardozo
