= Comptroller General of Brazil =

Former Brazilian government body

Comptroller General of the Union
- Portuguese: Controladoria-Geral da União

Ministry overview
- Formed: 3 April 2001; 25 years ago
- Jurisdiction: Federal government of Brazil
- Headquarters: SAS, Quadra 01, Bloco A Brasília, Federal District
- Annual budget: $1.29 b BRL (2023)
- Minister responsible: Vinícius Marques de Carvalho
- Website: www.gov.br/cgu/

The Comptroller General of the Union (Portuguese: Controladoria-Geral da União, abbreviated CGU), is a branch of the Brazilian federal government tasked with assisting the president regarding the treasury and public assets and the government's transparency policies. These tasks are carried out by way of public audits, fraud deterrence procedures, and other sort of internal control, corruption prevention, and ombudsman activities. It is also the central body of the Federal Government Internal Control System, responsible for supervising, managing and regulating the offices of the government.

The Chief Minister of the Comptroller General of the Union (Ministro-chefe da Controladoria-Geral da União) is appointed by the president and serves as a member of the Brazilian cabinet. The branch was created by the former president Fernando Henrique Cardoso and its first minister-inspector was the jurist Anadyr de Mendonça Rodrigues. In 2003, its name was changed and, in 2016, it was transformed into the Ministry of Transparency, Inspection and Comptroller General of the Union, with the same attributions and added the attributions of control and transparency. During Jair Bolsonaro's presidency, the branch was once again named as Comptroller General of the Union.

== List of comptrollers ==
No.	Portrait	Comptroller General	Took office	Left office	Time in office	President
1	Anadyr de Mendonça Rodrigues	Anadyr de Mendonça Rodrigues (1935–2016)	3 April 2001	1 January 2003	1 year, 273 days	Fernando Henrique Cardoso (PSDB)
2	Waldir Pires	Waldir Pires (1926–2018)	1 January 2003	31 March 2006	3 years, 89 days	Luiz Inácio Lula da Silva (PT)
3	Jorge Hage	Jorge Hage (born 1938)	31 March 2006	1 January 2015	8 years, 276 days	Luiz Inácio Lula da Silva (PT); Dilma Rousseff (PT)
4	Waldir Moysés Simão	Waldir Moysés Simão (born 1960)	1 January 2015	21 December 2015	354 days	Dilma Rousseff (PT)
–	Carlos Higino	Carlos Higino (born 1972); Acting	18 December 2015	29 February 2016	73 days	Dilma Rousseff (PT)
5	Luiz Navarro de Brito	Luiz Navarro de Brito (born 1966)	29 February 2016	12 May 2016	73 days	Dilma Rousseff (PT)
6	Fabiano Silveira	Fabiano Silveira (born 1974)	12 May 2016	30 May 2016	18 days	Michel Temer (MDB)
–	Carlos Higino	Carlos Higino (born 1972); Acting	30 May 2016	1 June 2016	2 days	Michel Temer (MDB)
7	Torquato Jardim	Torquato Jardim (born 1949)	1 June 2016	31 May 2017	364 days	Michel Temer (MDB)
8	Wagner de Campos Rosário	Wagner de Campos Rosário (born 1975)	31 May 2017	1 January 2023	5 years, 215 days	Michel Temer (MDB); Jair Bolsonaro (PL)
9	Vinícius Marques de Carvalho	Vinícius Marques de Carvalho (born 1977)	1 January 2023	Incumbent	3 years, 278 days	Luiz Inácio Lula da Silva (PT)
