= Osmar Serraglio =

Brazilian politician

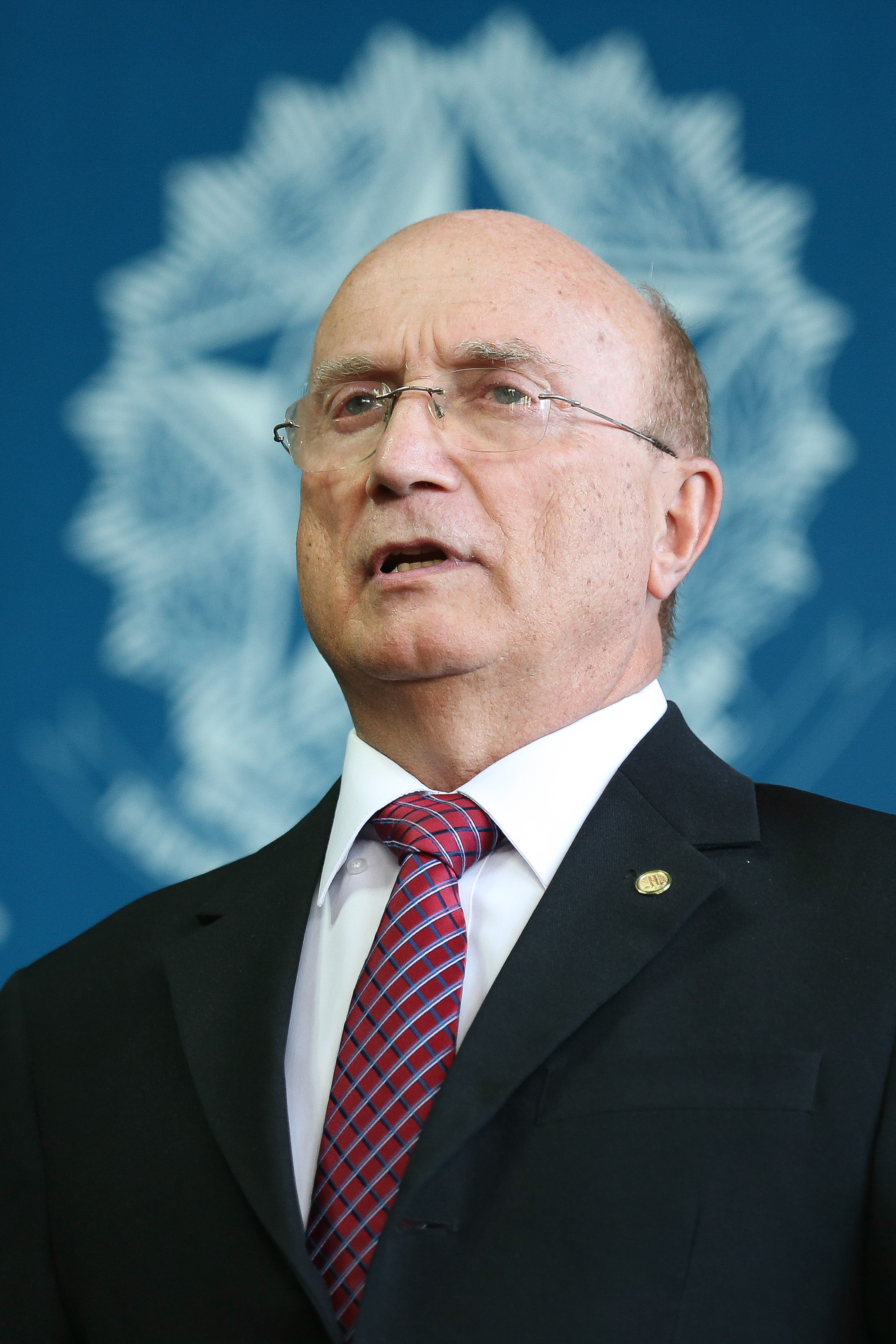

Federal Deputy
- In office 25 August 2021 – 1 February 2023
- Constituency: Paraná
- In office 1 February 1999 – 1 February 2019
- Constituency: Paraná

Minister of Justice
- In office 7 March 2017 – 28 May 2017
- President: Michel Temer
- Preceded by: José Levi do Amaral (acting)
- Succeeded by: Torquato Jardim

Personal details
- Born: Osmar José Serraglio; 23 May 1948 (age 78) Erechim, Paraná, Brazil
- Party: MDB (since 1978)
- Education: Law School of Curitiba
- Occupation: Lawyer, businessman
- Website: www.osmarserraglio.com.br

Osmar José Serraglio (born 23 May 1948) is a Brazilian lawyer, businessman, politician, and professor affiliated to the Brazilian Democratic Movement Party (PMDB). From 2021 to 2023, he served Federal Deputy for the state of Paraná and as minister of Justice and Public Security from March to May 2017. He was offered the office of the Ministry of Transparency, Supervision and CGU, but he declined, resuming office in the Chamber.

Political offices
Preceded by José Levi do Amaral (acting)	Minister of Justice and Public Security; 2017	Succeeded by Torquato Jardim
