= Fábio Medina Osório =

Brazilian lawyer and legal scholar (born 1967)

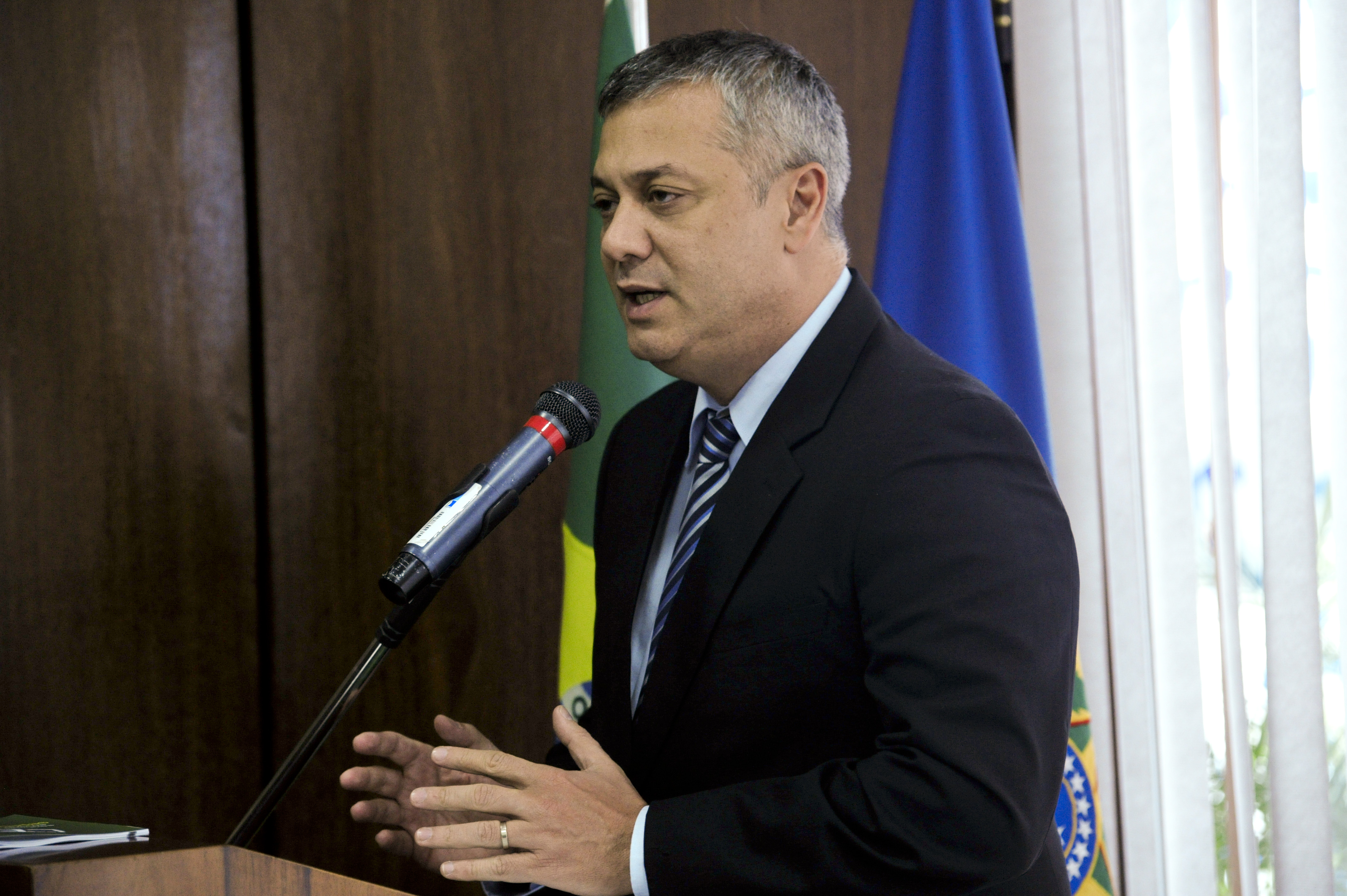
- Medina Osório in 2016

Attorney General of the Union
- In office May 12, 2016 – September 9, 2016
- President: Michel Temer
- Preceded by: José Eduardo Cardozo
- Succeeded by: Grace Mendonça

Personal details
- Born: July 31, 1967 (age 59) Porto Alegre, Rio Grande do Sul, Brazil
- Spouse: Patrícia Grassi Osório
- Education: Federal University of Rio Grande do Sul; Complutense University of Madrid
- Occupation: Lawyer, legal scholar

Fábio Medina Osório (born July 31, 1967) is a Brazilian legal scholar, lawyer and professor of law who formerly served as both a public prosecutor and Attorney General of the Union. He served as Attorney General of the Union (Advogado-Geral da União), with the status of a cabinet minister, from May 12 to September 9, 2016. His work focuses on administrative sanctions, anti-corruption law, environmental protection and compliance. His more recent publications address artificial intelligence, the intelligibility of public decision-making and cognitive sovereignty.

== Early life and education ==
Medina Osório graduated in law from the Federal University of Rio Grande do Sul in 1990 and completed a master's degree in law at the same institution in 1997. In 2003 he received a doctorate in administrative law from the Complutense University of Madrid, where he was supervised by Eduardo García de Enterría, a professor of administrative law and a former judge of the European Court of Human Rights (1978–1986). In his foreword to Teoria da Improbidade Administrativa, García de Enterría recalls Medina Osório's regular attendance and active participation in his weekly seminar for professors during his doctoral research. He also records that the thesis received the highest grade by unanimous decision.

Also in 2003 he co-founded the Instituto Internacional de Estudos de Direito do Estado (IIEDE), a legal research institute. Initially its vice-president, he became executive president in 2007 and continues to hold that position.

== Career ==
He joined the Public Prosecution Service (Ministério Público) of the State of Rio Grande do Sul in 1991 through a competitive entrance examination. The institution has constitutional autonomy and undertakes both criminal prosecution and civil proceedings to protect public and collective interests. As a public prosecutor, his work included combating corruption and protecting the environment. In March 2002 he was assigned as an environmental prosecutor in Porto Alegre, and from 2003 he also served on the governing board of the Brazilian Association of Members of the Public Prosecution Service for the Environment (ABRAMPA). He was appointed Deputy Secretary for Justice and Public Security (secretário adjunto), the deputy head of that department in the state government of Rio Grande do Sul, by governor Germano Rigotto in 2003 and served until 2005. After leaving the prosecution service in January 2006, he became legal director of the Bozano group.

On March 27, 2007, he founded the law firm Medina Osório Advogados in Porto Alegre, where he is founding and managing partner. The firm is headquartered in Brasília, Brazil's federal capital, with offices in Rio de Janeiro and Porto Alegre.

In 2019 he founded the Special Commission on Administrative Sanctions Law at the Federal Council of the Order of Attorneys of Brazil and became its inaugural chair. He was reappointed in April 2025 and is currently serving his third consecutive term.

He also sits on the council of the Movimento de Defesa da Advocacia (MDA), where he is serving a second consecutive term.

== Scholarship ==
Medina Osório's principal field of research is Brazilian administrative sanctions law, the branch of public law governing the exercise of punitive powers by administrative authorities, which concerns sanctions grounded in administrative law and the constitutional limits and safeguards governing their imposition. A publication of the school of the Office of the Attorney General of the Union described his book Direito Administrativo Sancionador as the first Brazilian monograph to adopt that term.

The work examines constitutional limits on state sanctions and their relationship with administrative misconduct, corporate anti-corruption legislation and compliance. Its tenth edition was published in 2025 by Revista dos Tribunais (Thomson Reuters), marking twenty-five years of the book's circulation, and an eleventh edition followed in 2026. Medina Osório has lectured in postgraduate programmes and at legal conferences in Brazil and abroad.

In her afterword to the tenth edition, Claudia Lima Marques, a full professor and former dean of the UFRGS Faculty of Law, describes the book as the first Brazilian monograph bearing that title and credits Medina Osório with pioneering the field's systematic development and scholarly autonomy. She identifies his reformulation of administrative sanctions as central: their legal character depends on their basis in administrative law, rather than exclusively on the authority imposing them, and therefore encompasses sanctions imposed by courts.

Marques also links the work's impact to its incorporation of European and Inter-American human rights case law, the introduction of the subject in UFRGS master's and doctoral courses at her invitation in 2004, and its influence on Brazilian anti-corruption legislation and interpretation. She associates the express recognition of administrative sanctions law in the 2021 reform of the Administrative Improbity Law with Medina Osório's scholarship.

His publications on corporate compliance include "Compliance transformativo: como blindar valor de mercado em tempo real", published by Brazil Journal in June 2025, and "Compliance transformativo no mercado de capitais", published by Valor Econômico in April 2025.

== Attorney General of the Union ==
Medina Osório was appointed Attorney General on May 12, 2016, by the interim government of Michel Temer, and the appointment was published in the Official Gazette the following day. The Attorney General heads the Advocacia-Geral da União (AGU), which represents the Union — the federal entity within Brazil's federation — in judicial and extrajudicial matters and advises the federal executive. He resigned from his law firm the same week.

During his tenure the office brought civil actions for administrative misconduct arising from Operation Car Wash against construction companies, former Petrobras executives and other defendants. One group of claims sought approximately R$17.4 billion in fines and R$5.6 billion in restitution, for a total of R$23 billion.

He left the post on September 9, 2016, when Temer replaced him with Grace Mendonça. Medina Osório subsequently said he had been removed after seeking damages from construction companies involved in the Petrobras scheme, stating that the government was seeking to "smother" the Car Wash inquiry. Eliseu Padilha, then Chief of Staff, rejected that account. The dispute was reported by The New York Times and was the subject of a September 2016 cover story in Veja.

== Recent work ==
In July 2025 Revista dos Tribunais published his article "O direito à compreensão na era da complexidade tecnológica", on the conditions required for public decisions to be intelligible. In June 2026 he published "Soberania cognitiva na era da IA", on the control of knowledge infrastructures.

Earlier public interventions included a 2014 interview for Veja's "Páginas Amarelas" section on ethics, enforcement and the relationship between citizens and the state.

== Selected works ==
- Direito Administrativo Sancionador [Administrative Sanctions Law], 11th ed. São Paulo: Revista dos Tribunais (Thomson Reuters), 2026. ISBN 978-65-260-3671-6
- Teoria da Improbidade Administrativa [Theory of Administrative Misconduct], 6th ed. São Paulo: Revista dos Tribunais (Thomson Reuters), 2022.
- "O direito à compreensão na era da complexidade tecnológica: fundamentos constitucionais, estatísticos e algorítmicos da transparência decisória" [The Right to Understanding in the Age of Technological Complexity: Constitutional, Statistical and Algorithmic Foundations of Decision-Making Transparency], Revista dos Tribunais, vol. 1077 (2025).
- "Soberania cognitiva na era da IA: o controle das infraestruturas do conhecimento como novo fator de poder" [Cognitive Sovereignty in the Age of AI: Control of Knowledge Infrastructures as a New Factor of Power], Migalhas (2026).
- "Compliance transformativo: como blindar valor de mercado em tempo real" [Transformative Compliance: How to Shield Market Value in Real Time], Brazil Journal (2025).
- "Compliance transformativo no mercado de capitais" [Transformative Compliance in the Capital Markets], Valor Econômico (2025).

Political offices
Preceded by José Eduardo Cardozo	Attorney General of the Union; 2016	Succeeded by Grace Mendonça
