= José Levi do Amaral =

Brazilian jurist

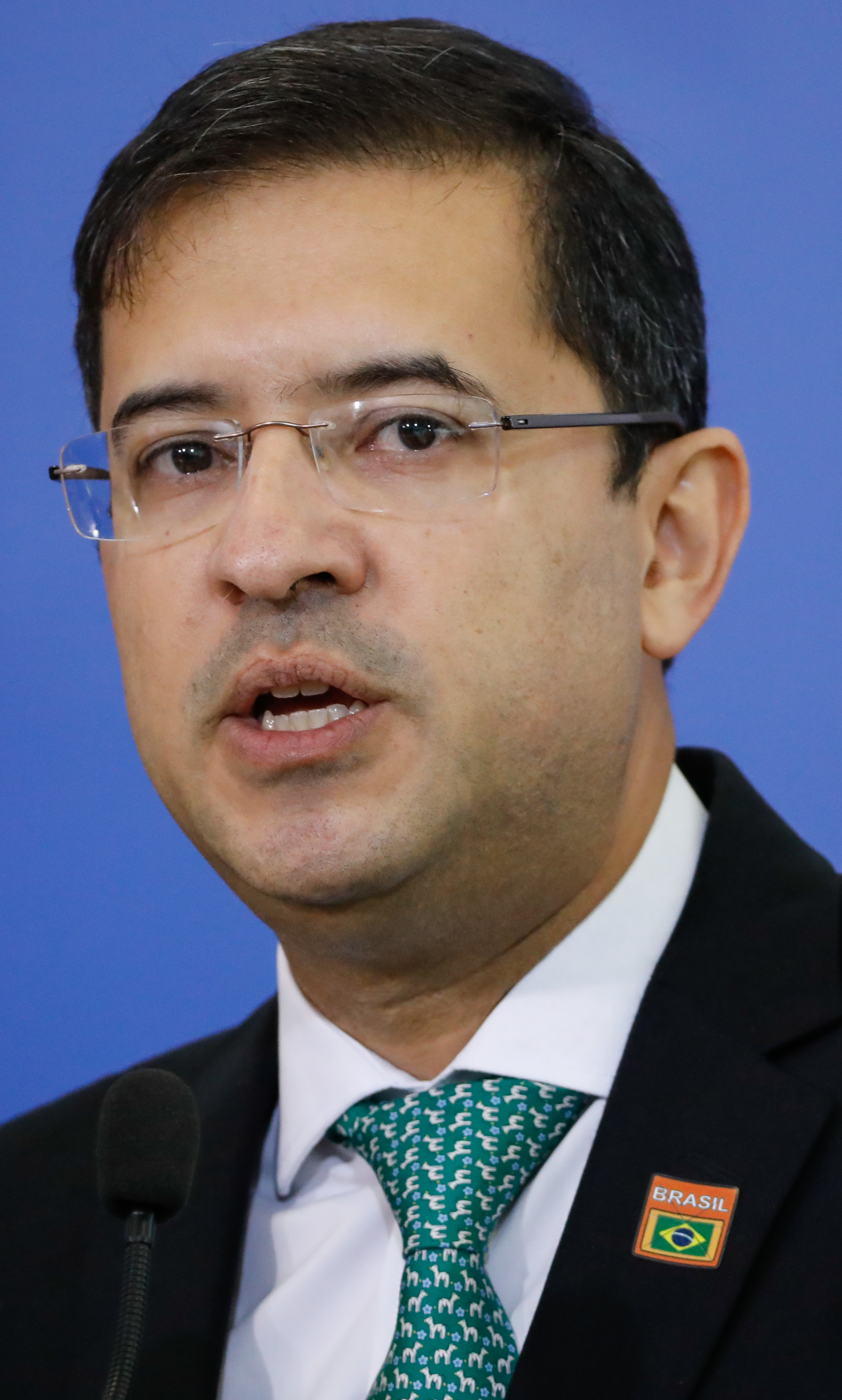

Attorney General for Brazil
- In office 29 April 2020 – 29 March 2021
- President: Jair Bolsonaro
- Preceded by: André Luiz Mendonça
- Succeeded by: André Luiz Mendonça

Attorney General for the National Treasury
- In office 3 January 2019 – 28 April 2020
- President: Jair Bolsonaro
- Minister: Paulo Guedes
- Preceded by: Fabrício da Soller
- Succeeded by: Ricardo Soriano de Alencar

Minister of Justice Acting
- In office 7 February 2017 – 7 March 2017
- President: Michel Temer
- Preceded by: Alexandre de Moraes
- Succeeded by: Osmar Serraglio

Personal details
- Born: José Levi Mello do Amaral Júnior; 22 June 1976 (age 50) São Gabriel, Rio Grande do Sul, Brazil
- Education: Federal University of Rio Grande do Sul (2001); University of São Paulo (2003)
- Occupation: Attorney for the National Treasury

José Levi Mello do Amaral Júnior (born 22 June 1976) is a Brazilian jurist. He has a career as Attorney for the National Treasury, as an acclaimed legal expert and professor and held the office of Attorney General for Brazil and Acting Minister of Justice and Public Security between February and March 2017, after the nomination of former minister Alexandre de Moraes to the Supreme Federal Court. He was also Attorney General for the National Treasury and is a licensed professor at the Law School of the University of São Paulo (USP).

== Biography ==
=== Academic life ===
Levi Mello is Master of State Law and Law Theory by the Federal University of Rio Grande do Sul and Doctor of State Law by the University of São Paulo. He has been professor of Constitutional Law at the Law School of the University of São Paulo since 2008. He is also professor of post-graduation at the Centro de Ensino Unificado de Brasília (UniCEUB).

=== Public career ===
Amaral was a government employee at the Chief of Staff between the governments of Fernando Henrique Cardoso and Luiz Inácio Lula da Silva, as well as at the State Secretariat of Finances of Minas Gerais, during the government of Aécio Neves. He was special advisor of José Serra when he was Governor of São Paulo and commanded the juridical advisory of the Secretariat of Micro and Small Business of the Presidency of the Republic, under the administration of Guilherme Afif Domingos, in the government of Dilma Rousseff. José Levi had been also Consultant General for the Union between June 2015 and May 2016, before assuming a seat at the Ministry of Justice and Public Security as Executive Secretary, the "Number 2" of the office, from May 2016 to November 2017.

When the former minister Alexandre de Moraes licensed, on 7 February 2017, Amaral Júnior assumed as Acting Minister, until the sworn-in of Osmar Serraglio, on 7 March 2017.

Attorney for the National Treasury by career since July 2000, he had been Deputy Attorney General for Tax and Social Security Consulting at the Attorney General's Office for the National Treasury from 7 February 2018 to 3 January 2019, when he was nominated for the office of Attorney General for the National Treasury.

Mello was confirmed by president Jair Bolsonaro as new Attorney General for Brazil, after André Luiz Mendonça was moved to the Minister of Justice and Public Security.

Legal offices
Preceded by Fabrício da Soller	Attorney General for the National Treasury; 2019–2020	Succeeded by Ricardo Soriano de Alencar
Political offices
Preceded by Alexandre de Moraes	Minister of Justice and Public Security; Acting; 2017	Succeeded by Osmar Serraglio
Preceded by André Mendonça	Attorney General for Brazil; 2020–2021	Succeeded by André Mendonça
