= Fábio Faria =

Fábio Faria may refer to:

- Fábio Faria (footballer) (born 1989), Portuguese footballer
- Fábio Faria (politician) (born 1977), Brazilian politician
