= Marx Beltrão =

Brazilian lawyer and politician

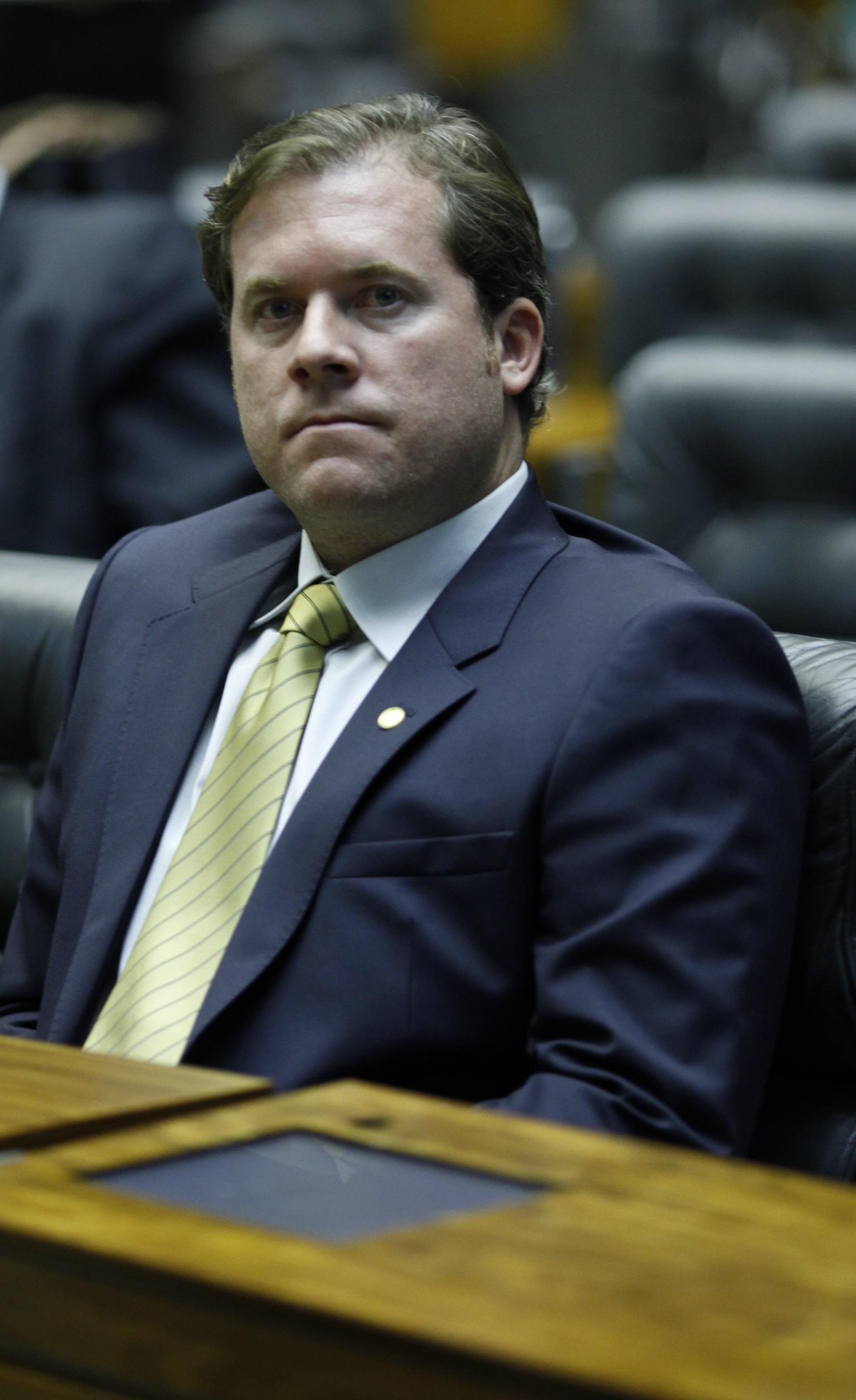

Minister of Tourism
- In office 5 October 2016 – 6 April 2018
- President: Michel Temer
- Preceded by: Henrique Eduardo Alves
- Succeeded by: Vinicius Lummertz

Member of the Chamber of Deputies
- Incumbent
- Assumed office 1 February 2015
- Constituency: Alagoas

Mayor of Coruripe
- In office 1 January 2005 – 1 January 2013

Personal details
- Born: Marx Beltrão Lima Siqueira; 28 November 1979 (age 46) Maceió, Alagoas, Brazil
- Party: UNIÃO (2026–present)
- Other political affiliations: PSB (until 2002); MDB (2003–2018); PSD (2018–2022); PP (2022–2026)
- Profession: Lawyer and politician
- Awards: Order of Rio Branco (Grand Cross)

Marx Beltrão Lima Siqueira (born 28 November 1979) is a Brazilian lawyer and politician affiliated to Progressistas (PP), former mayor of the city of Coruripe, current federal deputy from the state of Alagoas and former minister of Tourism appointed by president Michel Temer.

Political offices
| Vacant Title last held by Henrique Eduardo Alves | Minister of Tourism; 2016–2018 | Succeeded by Vinicius Lummertz |
