= Fabiano Silveira =

Brazilian lawyer and politician

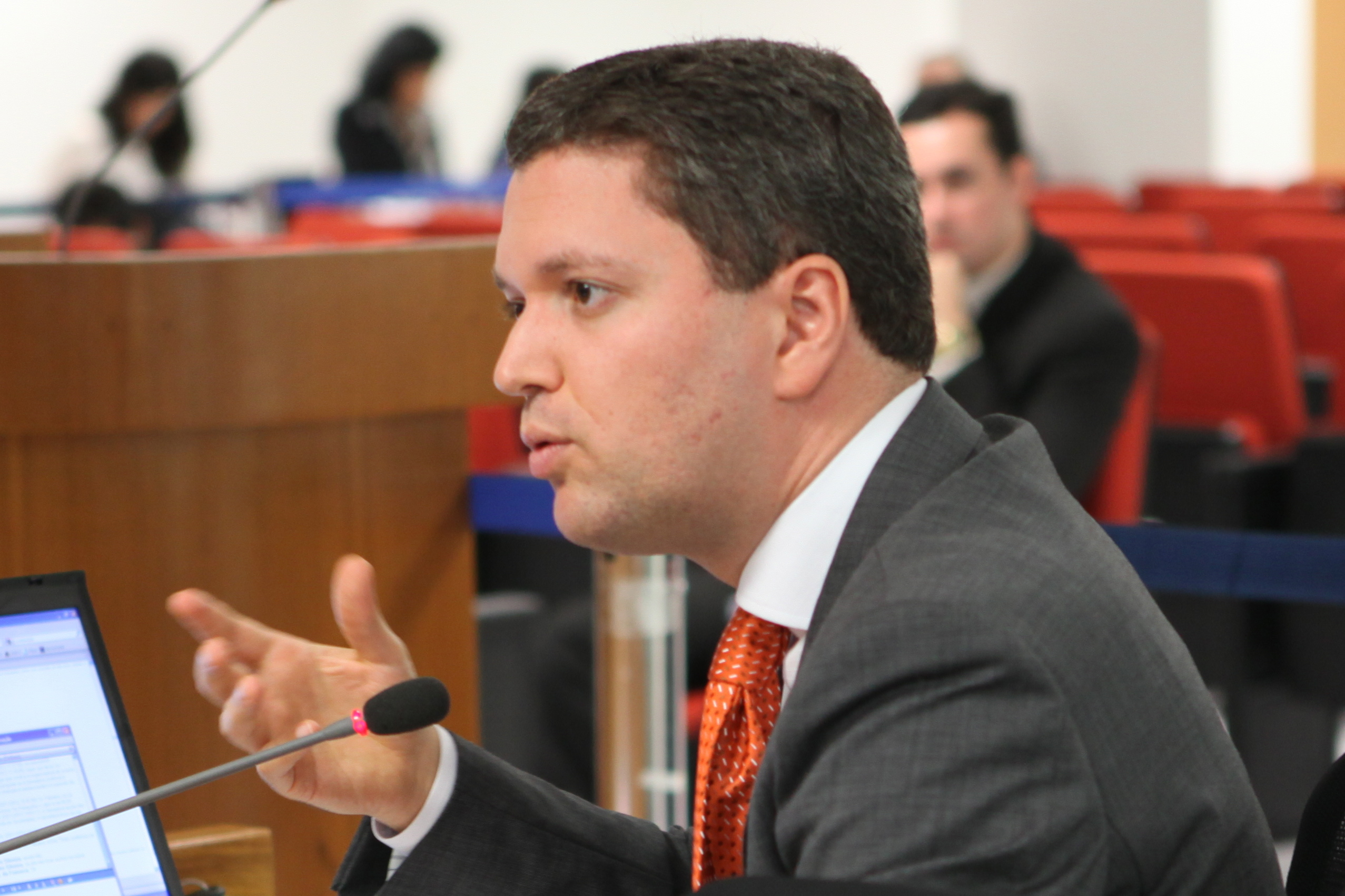
- Silveira in 2012

Minister of Transparency, Supervision and Control of Brazil
- In office 12 May 2016 – 30 May 2016
- President: Michel Temer
- Preceded by: Luiz Navarro de Brito
- Succeeded by: Torquato Jardim

Counselor to the National Justice Council
- In office August 27, 2013 – May 12, 2016
- President: Dilma Rousseff
- Preceded by: Bruno Dantas Nascimento

Counselor to National Council of the Public Prosecutor's Office
- In office December 12, 2011 – August 27, 2013
- Nominated by: Dilma Rousseff

Personal details
- Born: Fabiano Augusto Martins Silveira; December 19, 1974 (age 51) Belo Horizonte, Minas Gerais, Brazil
- Education: Federal University of Minas Gerais

Fabiano Augusto Martins Silveira (Belo Horizonte, December 19, 1974) is a Brazilian lawyer and politician. He is a legislative advisor to the Federal Senate of Brazil and was briefly the Minister of Transparency, Supervision and Control of Brazil.

== Education and academic career ==
Silveira holds a BA (1998), Masters (2003) and PhD (2008) in Law from the Federal University of Minas Gerais and carried out post-doctoral studies at the University of Rome "La Sapienza" from 2006 and 2007. Silveira has served as a substitute teacher at the Law School of Federal University of Minas Gerais and the Pontifical Catholic University of Minas Gerais. He has also been a visiting professor to several specialized post-graduate courses at public and private institutions.

== Political career ==
He has served as the legislative consultant of the Brazilian Senate in the areas of criminal law, criminal procedure, and penal law since 2002. Silveira was a member of the Reform of the Criminal Procedure Code Committee of the Senate (Comissão de Reforma do Código de Processo Penal do Senado Federal) from 2008 to 2009 and the Management Commission of the II Republican Pact of State for Justice System More Affordable, Effective and Agile Justice System (Comitê Gestor do II Pacto Republicano de Estado por um Sistema de Justiça mais Acessível, Ágil e Efetivo) from 2009 to 2010. He served as councilor of the National Council of the Public Ministry (Conselho Nacional do Ministério Público, CNMP) from 2011 to 2013 and the Brazilian National Justice Council (Conselho Nacional de Justiça) from 2013 to 2015, and was retained in this role for the 2015-2017 term. He held the role of National Justice Ombudsman (Ouvidor Nacional de Justiça) from January 14, 2015 to January 14, 2016.

=== Ministry of Transparency, Supervision and Control ===
Silveira was appointed to as Minister to the newly created Ministry of Transparency, Supervision and Control by acting-president Michel Temer on May 12, 2016. He resigned from the position on May 31, 2016. Recordings were released by the press that suggest his criticism of both the large-scale investigation of Petrobras, the Brazilian state oil company, and the anti-corruption campaign Operation Car Wash.
