= Catholic University of Brasília =

Private university in Brazil

- Universidade Católica de Brasília
- Coat of arms of the university
- Other names: UCB
- Motto: Veritas nisi vi ipsius veritatis
- Type: Private, non-profit
- Established: March 12, 1974
- Affiliations: Roman Catholic Church
- Rector: Prof. Dr. Ricardo Pereira Calegari
- Vice rector: José Teixeira da Costa Nazareth
- Academic staff: 879
- Students: 19,000
- Undergraduates: 16,000
- Postgraduates: 3,000
- Location: Taguatinga, Federal District, Brazil
- Campus: Urban
- Colours: Medium blue & dark blue
- Website: www.ucb.br

Catholic University of Brasília (Portuguese: Universidade Católica de Brasília, UCB) is a private, non-profit, Roman Catholic university located in Taguatinga, in the Federal District, in Brazil. As the only private university in the Federal District, it ranks sixth in the list of private institutions in Brazil. It is maintained by the Catholic Archdiocese of Brasília.

== History ==
The Catholic School of Humanities was founded in 1974, and offered courses in business administration, economics, and education, to fulfill the educational needs of the residents settled in the new capital. History of the university is linked to the creation of Brasília during the 1950s, when the capital was moved from Rio de Janeiro to a more central location. Brasília became a major growth hub in the country.

Number of courses being offered at the first private college of the capital (the Catholic School of Humanities) increased over the years, and the university was renamed in 1980 as the Catholic Integrated College of Brasília (FICB). Towards the end of 1994, it was once again renamed as the Catholic University of Brasilia - UCB, by the Federal Education Council through the Ministerial Decree 1.827 of December 28. The Catholic University of Brasília - UCB is the only private university in the Federal District, and ranks sixth in the list of private institutions in Brazil.

== Schools, faculties and institutes ==
UCB has three campuses: Campus I (the main Campus) is located in the Taguatinga. Campus II, namely Asa Norte, and Campus III, or Asa Sul, are located in the Brasília. The university is associated with three units in Asa Sul - Dom Bosco School, CEMA, and Pius XII - which along with Universa Foundation, offer most of the Graduate "Lato Sensu" Courses.The Hospital of the Catholic University of Brasília (HUCB) is also located in Taguatinga.

Main academic units of UCB include the Library System – SIBI - which is responsible for five physical libraries and a virtual library with more than 100,000 titles and 218,000 volumes. It also includes Software Sections (22) of which seven are public, Publisher Universa, 147 laboratories, HUCB – Hospital of the Catholic University of Brasilia - Catholic Online and Distance Education Centre – LCC / EAD. These offer postgraduate "Lato Sensu" degrees, undergraduate (bachelor's and licentiate) degrees, extension programs and feature 25 poles, of which 21 are located in Brazil, 3 are in Japan and 1 is in Angola.

Altogether UCB has an area of about 620.000m² and approximately 116.000m² of its campus is built around the Federal District (Campus I, CAAN, CAAS, HUCB and associated units) area.

The main Campus of UCB features 6 Schools which are:

- School of Health

Offers 16 courses (7 Bachelors, 2 Bachelors / Undergraduate, 1 Technological Distance Course, 3 Master's degrees and 3 Doctorate Degrees)

- Polytechnic School

Offers 13 courses (5 Bachelors, 3 Technological Degrees, 3 Technological Distance Courses and 2 Masters)

- School of Business

Offers 21 courses (6 Bachelors, 3 Bachelors distance courses, 4 Technological Courses, 5 Technological Distance Courses, 2 Masters and 1 PhD)

- School of Education and Humanities

Offers 12 courses (6 Undergraduate Degrees, 1 Bachelor, 3 Distance courses, 1 Masters and 1 Doctorate in Education)

- School of Medicine

Offers 2 courses (one Bachelor and one master's degree)

- School of Law

Offers 4 courses (1 Bachelor, 2 Technological Distance Courses and 1 Master)

== Education ==
In addition to normal classroom courses, the university also offers a distance education program. Number of students enrolled in all distance education courses was 1,869 in 2003, and rose to 3,283 in 2006, a 75% increase. Until 2006, the university offered eight undergraduate courses and seven postgraduate courses as part of its distance-learning module. In the later years, the online course curriculum was expanded with the help of the International Covenants on Centers for Distance Education, or PEADs.

Today, the university offers 34 undergraduate degree courses, 27 graduate courses, 6 MBA programs and 5 Doctoral graduate courses.

== Undergraduate programs ==
UCB currently offers 53 majors. Undergraduate courses are offered by the university under four major categories:

Social Sciences

- Business administration
- Political Science and Government
- Accounting
- Economics
- Digital Communication
- Social Communication
- Law
- Philosophy
- Languages
- Pedagogy
- Teacher Training Program
- Psychology
- International Relations
- Bilingual Executive Secretary
- Social Service

Exact Sciences

- Architecture and Urbanism
- Computer Science
- Environmental Engineering
- Civil Engineering
- Physics
- Mathematics
- Chemistry
- IT Systems
- Technology in Logistics

Biological Sciences

- Bio-medicine
- Biological Sciences
- Physical Education
- Nursing
- Pharmacy
- Physiotherapy
- Gerontology
- Medicine
- Nutrition
- Dentistry

Distance Courses

- Bachelor of Arts
- Bachelor of Business Administration
- Bachelor of Science in Accounting
- Degree in Tourism
- Degree in Philosophy
- Degree in Pedagogy
- Educational Training Program
- Technology in Foreign Trade
- Technology in IT Management
- Technology in Human Resource Management
