= Torquato Jardim =

Brazilian jurist/politician

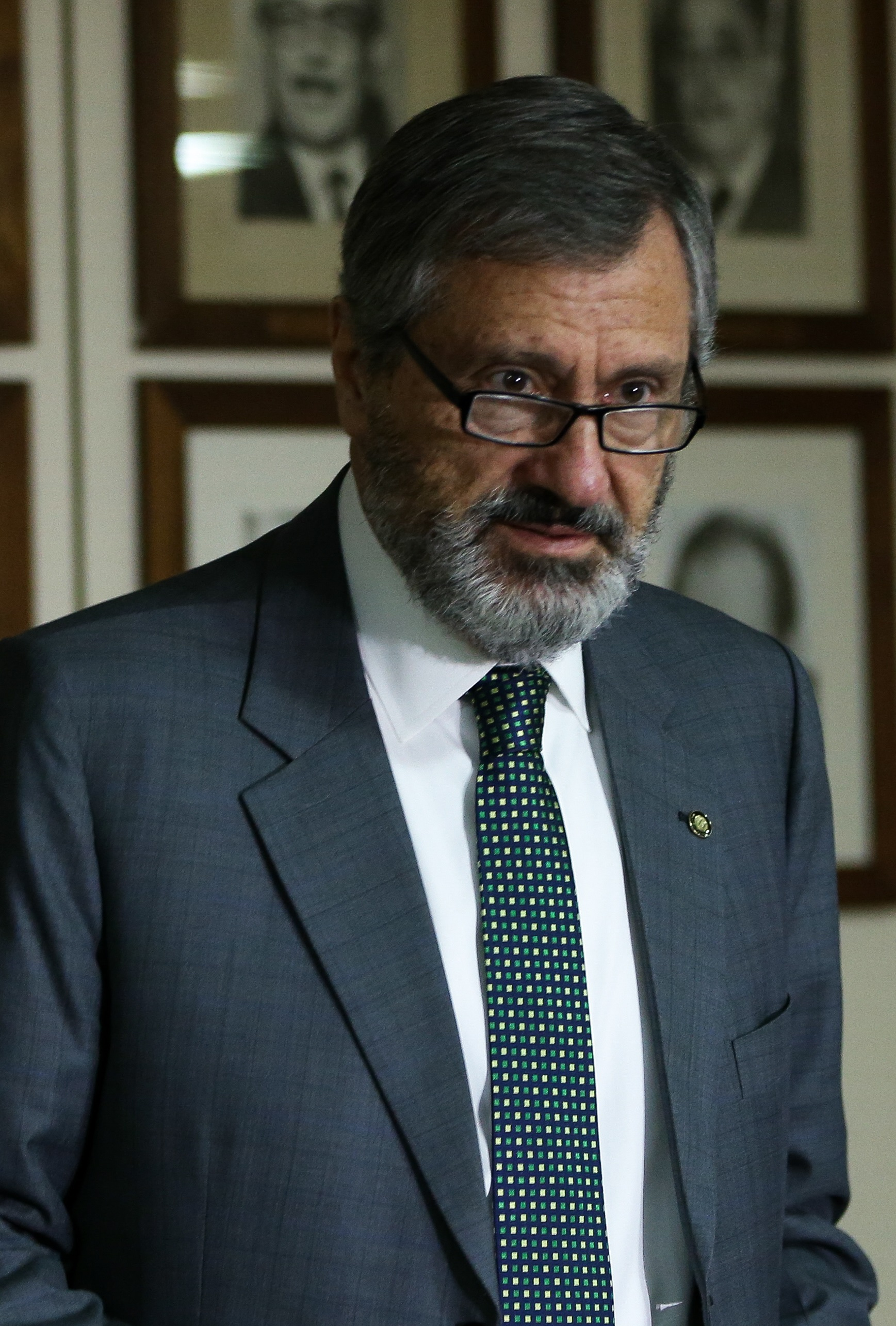

Minister of Justice
- In office 28 May 2017 – 1 January 2019
- President: Michel Temer
- Preceded by: Osmar Serraglio
- Succeeded by: Sergio Moro

Minister of Transparency, Supervision and CGU
- In office 2 June 2016 – 28 May 2017
- President: Michel Temer
- Preceded by: Carlos Higino Ribeiro de Alencar (acting)
- Succeeded by: Wagner de Campos Rosário

Justice of the Superior Electoral Court
- In office 26 May 1988 – 18 April 1996

Personal details
- Born: Torquato Lorena Jardim; 12 December 1949 (age 76) Rio de Janeiro, Brazil
- Occupation: Jurist

Torquato Lorena Jardim (born 12 December 1949 in Rio de Janeiro) is a Brazilian jurist. He was minister of the Superior Electoral Court (TSE) from 1988 to 1996 and is currently minister of Transparency, Supervision and CGU, appointed by President Michel Temer.

On 28 May 2017, Brazilian president Michel Temer named Jardim as Minister of Justice.

Political offices
Preceded by Carlos Higino Ribeiro de Alencar (acting)	Minister of Transparency, Supervision and CGU; 2016–2017	Succeeded by Wagner de Campos Rosário
Preceded by Osmar Serraglio	Minister of Justice; 2017–2019	Succeeded by Raul Jungmann as Minister of Public Security (2018)
Preceded by Osmar Serraglio	Minister of Justice; 2017–2019	Succeeded by Sergio Moro as Minister of Justice and Public Security (2019)
