= Brazilian criminal justice =

The Brazilian criminal justice system comes from the civil law of Western Europe, in particular Portuguese law, which derives from Roman law. The earliest legal documents in Brazil were land grants and charters dating to the early 16th century, which continued to be used until independence in 1822. Various basic principles of law are enshrined in the 1988 Constitution, such as the principle of legality and the principle of human dignity.

Various institutions work together to implement the criminal justice system, including the National Congress, which passes laws to define what acts are considered criminal in the Penal Code and codifies the criminal procedures for implementing them; three national and multiple state-level police forces to prevent and combat crime and hold alleged perpetrators for prosecution; the judiciary, including 92 courts at the federal and state levels, to interpret the codes, and hear prosecutions and judge perpetrators; and a correctional system to punish and rehabilitate convicted criminals.

The workings of the criminal justice system have had many changes, reflecting Brazil's history of colonialism, Empire, Republics, military dictatorship, and democracy, and of persistent, endemic corruption and scandals. There have been attempts to rein in corruption: in the 2010s, Operation Car Wash an investigation into corruption within the government which lasted eight years. The investigation extended to multiple foreign countries, and resulted in a thousand indictments, half a billion dollars in fines, affected three former presidents, and imprisoned one.

Rates of crime in Brazil are elevated. Brazil ranks high amongst the most number of homicides in the world; it ranked 4th in South America in 2021. In the correctional system, although laws guarantee prisoners a livable amount of space and decent living conditions, in fact prisons are very overcrowded, typically housing two to five times the number of inmates they were designed for.

== Introduction ==
=== Historical background ===
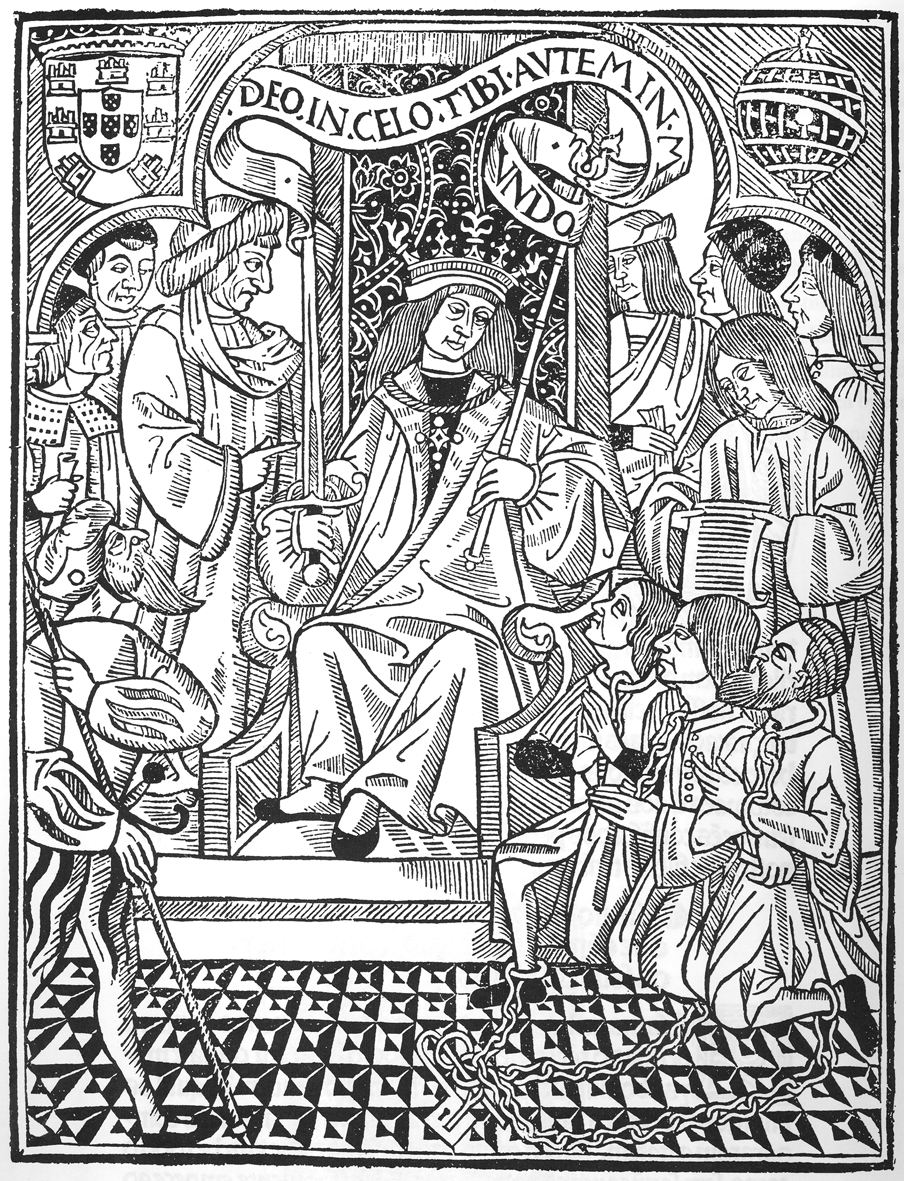
King Manuel I exercising justice, in a woodcut from the 1514 edition of the Manueline Ordinances.

Brazil's legal tradition derives from the civil law of Western Europe, in particular Portuguese law, which in turn comes from Roman law.

Unlike other parts of Latin America, Brazil in pre-colonial times before the arrival of the Portuguese in 1500 did not have any developed indigenous cultures with institutions of their own, such as Mayas, Incas or Aztecs elsewhere. It was also very different from Spanish or English colonization, as Brazil was a vast and very sparsely populated region. Also, Portugal was busy with African and Asian colonies, before looking toward Brazil around 1530. In 1548, the General Government was created (governo-geral) to administer the area.

Some of the first legal documents were the Gift letters For hereditary ownership, and the Foral, a royal decree which called for defining borders and administering the land from the early 16th century, shortly after the Portuguese arrived in Brazil. These continued to be used until independence in 1822. Indigenous practices were ignored, although outside legal practice they had a great influence on the developing nation. The huge, unknown and hostile environment led to slow development of legal practices due to the distance of the motherland, and generally lacked legitimacy from initial discovery to declaration of the kingdom in 1815, and the republic in 1822.

Civil law came to Brazil with the Empire of Brazil.

Originally a plantation economy, Brazil abolished slavery in several stages during the 19th century.

==== Colonial period (1500–1822) ====
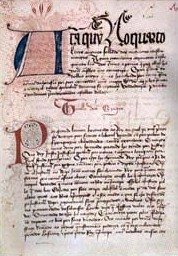
Page from Alfonsine Ordinances

During the colonial period, the system of law consisted of Royal Ordinances: the Alfonsine Ordinances (Ordenações Afonsinas) from 1446, which drew heavily from Roman law, the Philippine Ordinances (Ordenações Filipinas) from 1603, and the Manueline Ordinances of 1512. The Alfonsine Ordinances are unique in being the first norms produced in the way modern codes are. The Manueline was a revised version of the Philippine, and the first printed code anywhere; portions remained in effect after independence in 1822, and it was not fully replaced until Clovis Bevilaqua's Civil Code of 1917.

==== Old Republic (1889–1930) ====
Changes in earlier, classical views of criminology arrived in Brazil in the nineteenth century, especially after 1870, from the ferment and discourse in Europe in positivist criminology, and fin de siècle views of "degeneration" and supposed "scientific" methods of dealing with deviant elements of society and protecting society from them.

Positivist criminology emerged in Europe in the 1880s in the context of legal and scientific discourse on criminality and deviance which attempted to understand the question, "what makes a man become a criminal?". In Brazil, these currents emerged during the First Republic, which was a period of intense political, economic, and social upheaval. The Republic was proclaimed in 1889, the economy was being transformed by capitalism, and society was being reshaped in a more individualistic form. The legal system, and especially criminal law, struggled to keep pace with the whirlwinds sweeping Brazil during the First Republic.

The Zeitgeist of the time was the advance of science and cause and effect in understanding phenomena, replacing earlier, more spiritualist views dating to the Middle Ages. Evil had to be understood and explained through observation, calculation, and the use of neutral experiment and scientific method. This extended to the field of medicine, which also was seen as the arbiter of what is normal or pathological, and especially psychiatry, which became key, as besides being concerned with mental illness asoaddressed the issue of identifying dangerous behavior.

Fin de siècle Europe was suffused with images of degeneration and decay, and the idea the dangerous classes and criminality would take over society was common. This impeded progress, and to stop it, science would analyze it and provide possible cures. Degeneration became an umbrella term for numerous categories of people, spanning criminals, prostitutes, the insane, and other forms of deviance, and could be countered by the emerging field of criminology, whose object of study was the deviant and attempted to understand the causes, in order to be able to protect society, and to support progress by reducing or controlling degeneration. Cesare Lombroso combined many of these threads and analyzed theories about criminality from a medical perspective, essentially creating a "criminal profile" of someone who is born a criminal. This led to a conception of criminal anthropology by doctors who viewed crime as a symptom of the inborn nature of a criminal, who therefore needed to be treated and not punished. The field of law was encroached upon by biology.

The "scientific" development of the idea of "degenerate individuals" veered away from actual study of the criminal element, and towards a means of governing. "Normal" individuals (i.e., white men, employed, civilized per European standards) viewed other types as deviants from normality and a threat to the social order. All of these ideas and theories and attitudes and methods of dealing with them arrived in Brazil from Europe in the nineteenth century, especially after 1870. The new ideas from the positivist school mixed with earlier liberal views from the classical school, and were well received by Brazilian jurists, being viewed as the latest advances from Europe, and resulted in various legal and institutional changes in Brazil, especially in the area of punishment, and control.

Brazil already had a mature legal culture, and the reception of European criminology happened during a time of profound social and political changes from the end of slavery to consolidation of the republic. There was an atmosphere of openness and inclusion of new ideas, such as by the Recife School. This paved the way for the acceptance of positivist criminology, with its air of modernity and free from a spiritualist past they rejected, and moving towards a goal of ensuring social order, which is part of the motto on the Republican flag. The Republic's first piece of business was the Criminal code of 1890; the Constitution itself was only written the following year.

The integration of positivist criminology by Brazilian legal culture took place gradually, centering around legal scholars in the top law schools. There was resistance at first, and Tobias Barreto, a professor of legal philosophy at Recife law school was especially critical of Italian criminologist Lombroso's theories of anthropological criminology and heritable criminality, and was aware of the incursions of the medical field into law. João Vieira, professor of criminal law in Recife, was the first jurist to support criminological positivism in Brazil, although it took him a while to fully adopt its tenets. Vieira's debates with João Baptista Pereira, author of the republican code and professor of criminal law at the Rio law school was a microcosm of the debate between proponents of the classical and positivist schools in Brazil for the duration of the First Republic. These, in turn, were a reflection of debate on this topic going on in Europe, mostly in Italy, between these schools. Vieira was a gradualist, and his increasing understanding and support of the new ideas did not translated into attempts to reform the classical code into a criminological one; his approach followed that of Italian criminologists Ferri and Garofalo, who held that positivist reform would be inevitable, but gradual. He took over revising the Republican code, but chose to find improvements by referring to the old, Imperial code, hoping to increase the prestige of the Republican code through links to the venerated Roman code.

=== Theory ===
The German, tripartite system of criminal theory underlies the theory of crime in Brazil, as well as in all Latin American countries.

English-speaking common law systems are based on the simpler, bipartite system of criminal theory. The central thesis is that a criminal offense is based on two elements: the actus reus, or external action in the world, and the mens rea, or internal mind state, in particular, intent and that for a crime to occur, both elements must be present. France and many countries whose codes are influenced by French law which do not follow common law nevertheless also use the bipartite system, where they call the two elements the material element (actus reus) and the moral element (mens rea). The American Model Penal Code was a project of law released in 1962 which heavily influenced penal law in the United States, and came up with a four-part division of mens rea, more than most European countries based on the tripartite system, which distinguish between only two elements, negligence and intent.

The German tripartite system, on the other hand, takes a different approach, with a criminal offense having three dimensions: the definition of the offense (German: Tatbestand; tipo in Portuguese and Spanish); (Note: Tipo: "'Tipo', como a própria denominação nos está a induzir, é o modelo, o padrão de conduta que o Estado, por meio de seu único instrumento, a lei, visa impedir que seja praticada, ou determina que seja levada a efeito por todos nós. A palavra tipo, na lição de Cirilo de Vargas, 'constitui uma tradução livre do vocábulo Tatbestand, empregada no texto do art. 59 do Código Penal alemão de 1871, e provinha da expressão latina corpus delicti. O tipo, portanto, é a descrição precisa do comportamento humano, feita pela lei penal.'" (Mendez (2010) Tipo penal) "Tipo, as the name itself suggests, is the model, the pattern of conduct that the State, through its only instrument, the law, aims to prevent from being practiced, or determines that it be carried out by all of us. The word tipo, in the words of Cirilo de Vargas, 'is a free translation of the word Tatbestand, used in the text of article 59 of the German Penal Code of 1871 (en:Strafgesetzbuch, de:Reichsstrafgesetzbuch, de:s:Strafgesetzbuch für das Deutsche Reich (1871)#§. 59., and came from the Latin expression corpus delicti. The tipo, therefore, is the precise description of human behavior, as made by the criminal law.'") wrongfulness or unlawfulness; and culpability or blameworthiness (mens rea). This allows criminal defense lawyers to find a particular action as unlawful but not culpable, and since all three must be present in order to find a defendant guilty, that is sufficient for acquittal.

=== Principles ===
Due process of law (devido processo legal) was first guaranteed in the 1988 Constitution in Article 5 paragraph LIV, and provide that "no one shall be deprived of freedom or of his assets without due process of law". (Note: Due process: ninguém será privado da liberdade ou de seus bens sem o devido processo legal. Constitution, Art. 5, paragraph LIV.) Other rights include the right to challenge evidence and reply to arguments (the adversarial system); the right of a full defense (ampla defesa, Art. 5 LV); public availability of all court reasoning and decisions (Art. 5, LX and Art. 93 IX); inadmissibility of evidence obtained illegally (Art. 5 LVI); the presumption of innocence (Art. 5 LVII); (Note: Presumption of innocence: ninguém será considerado culpado até o trânsito em julgado de sentença penal condenatória. Art. 5 LVII) compensation for wrongful conviction (Art. 5 LXXV); protection from arrest except per judicial warrant or when caught in the act (Art. 5 LXI); (Note: Protection from unreasonable arrest: ninguém será preso senão em flagrante delito ou por ordem escrita e fundamentada de autoridade judiciária competente, salvo nos casos de transgressão militar ou crime propriamente militar, definidos em lei. Art. 5 LXI) release on recognizance (Art. 5 LXVI); right to remain silent and to have a lawyer (Art. 5 XII); (Note: Right to a lawyer: o preso será informado de seus direitos, entre os quais o de permanecer calado, sendo-lhe assegurada a assistência da família e de advogado) and the right to a speedy trial (Art. 5 LXXVIII). (Note: Speedy trial: a todos, no âmbito judicial e administrativo, são assegurados a razoável duração do processo e os meios que garantam a celeridade de sua tramitação. Supplementary notes: (Incluído pela Emenda Constitucional nº 45, de 2004) (Vide ADIN 3392))

- Principle of legality in criminal law (principio da legalidade) or Priority of the Norm: the Principle of Legality in Brazilian law is based on article 1 of the Penal Code, which states that there is a requirement for the prior existence of law defining the practice of a given act as a crime, without which the perpetrator can not be convicted. Known from the Latin Nullum crimen, nulla poena sine lege praevia.
- Right to a full defense: This states that everyone has the right to a defense, regardless of the crime committed and its circumstances. If the person cannot afford to pay for their defense, the state will provide it.
- Principle of human dignity: this is the idea that human dignity is an essential value of the fundamental rights guaranteed by the Constitution in Article I, III. Examples include laws to punish discrimination (Article 5, XLI) and to ensure physical and moral rights to prison inmates (Article 5, XLIX).

=== Current outlook ===
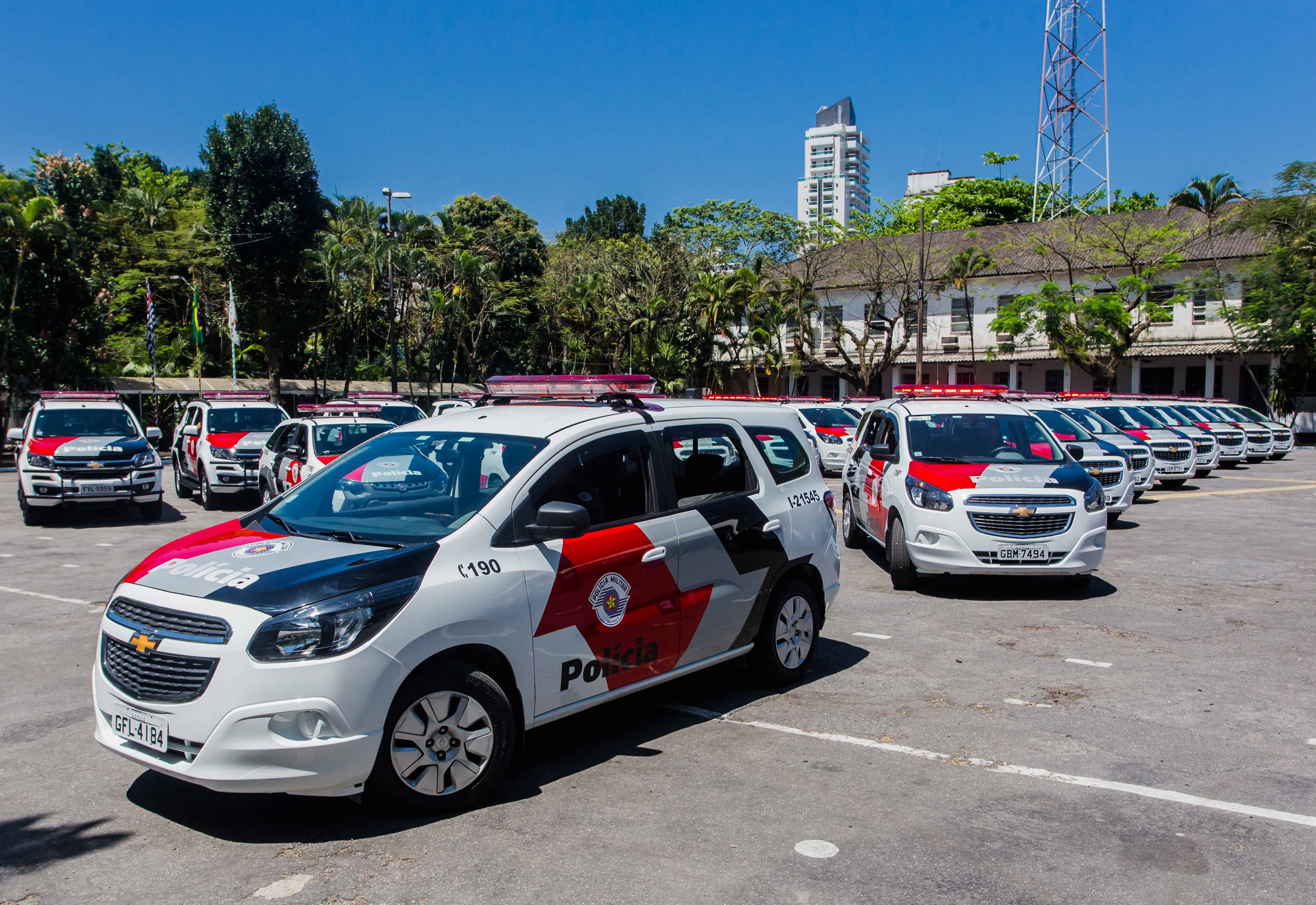
Police cars of the Military Police of São Paulo State in 2017

Crime is a persistent issue that affects the population either directly or indirectly in Brazil. The country has above-average global levels of violent crime, with particularly high rates of gun violence and homicides. According to the United Nations Office on Drugs and Crime (UNODC), Brazil had an intentional homicide rate of 19.28 per 100,000 inhabitants in 2023, down from 20.08 in 2022 and 31.16 in 2017.

In 2025, Brazil recorded 34,086 homicides, down from 38,374 homicides reported in 2024. This decline continues a trend that began in 2020, with a 25% reduction in homicides since then. The homicide rate in Brazil for 2025 was 16 per 100,000 inhabitants, the lowest in over a decade.

Brazil's numerous ports and its borders with many South American countries makes it a key center of the global cocaine trafficking trade. Prison-based gangs such as the First Capital Command (Primeiro Comando da Capital – PCC) and the Red Command (Comando Vermelho – CV) have expanded from Nationwide and are heavily involved in international drug and armstrafficking. Militias form another pole for violent crime and are made up chiefly of police officers, current and former. They hold sway over whole neighborhoods, committing extortion and extrajudicial killings.

== Structure ==
The Judiciary of Brazil is the system of courts and judicial institutions established by the Constitution of Brazil (1988) to carry out judicial functions, ensure the rule of law, and protect constitutional guarantees. It operates under a tripartite division of powers alongside the executive and legislative branches, but maintains institutional independence and oversight. Among its key organs are the Supreme Federal Court (Supremo Tribunal Federal, STF), which serves as the ultimate constitutional court; the Superior Court of Justice (Superior Tribunal de Justiça, STJ), which handles non-constitutional federal issues; and specialized courts such as the Superior Labor Court, Superior Electoral Court, and Superior Military Court. Oversight and administration are in part managed by the National Council of Justice (Conselho Nacional de Justiça, CNJ), which regulates administrative, financial, and disciplinary matters of the judiciary. The system is divided between common justice (federal and state courts) for most civil and criminal cases, and specialized justice (labor, electoral, military) which deals with specific jurisdictional areas.

=== Ministry of Justice ===
The Ministry of Justice was created under the Empire of Brazil, through the decree of 3 July 1822 by Pedro I of Brazil, as Secretary of State for the Affairs of Justice (Secretaria de Estado dos Negócios da Justiça.

Under Article 2 of the Constitution, the Ministry of Justice and Public Security cannot interfere in the judiciary branch.

=== Judiciary ===
The 92 courts of the Brazilian judiciary
	State		Federal	
Superior courts		0	Supreme Federal Court; STF	1
Superior courts		0	Federal superior courts STJ TSE TST STM	4
Common justice	Court of Justice; TJ	27	Federal Regional Courts; TRF1 .. TRF6	6
Specialized justice	Court of Military Justice	3	Electoral Justice Courts; TRE	27
Specialized justice	TJM	3	Regional Labor Courts; TRT	24
Total		30		62

The Judiciary of Brazil is the system of courts and judicial institutions established by the Constitution of Brazil (1988) to carry out judicial functions, ensure the rule of law, and protect constitutional guarantees. It operates under a tripartite division of powers alongside the executive and legislative branches, but maintains institutional independence and oversight. Among its key organs are the Supreme Federal Court (Supremo Tribunal Federal, STF), which serves as the ultimate constitutional court; the Superior Court of Justice (Superior Tribunal de Justiça, STJ), which handles non-constitutional federal issues; and specialized courts such as the Superior Labor Court, Superior Electoral Court, and Superior Military Court. Oversight and administration are in part managed by the National Council of Justice (Conselho Nacional de Justiça, CNJ), which regulates administrative, financial, and disciplinary matters of the judiciary. The system is divided between common justice (federal and state courts) for most civil and criminal cases, and specialized justice (labor, electoral, military) which deals with specific jurisdictional areas.

The Federal government of Brazil is defined by the 1988 constitution which defines a tripartite separation of powers into the legislative, executive, and judicial branches of government. Aside from those, the country also has the Public Ministry which acts autonomously and has in the past been referred to as the country's fourth branch.

In terms of jurisdiction, the main division is between common justice (Portuguese: Justiça Comum) and specialized justice (Justiça Especializada). Common justice, composed of federal and state justices (and the Federal District's own justice), handles most civil and criminal cases. Specialized justice, composed of electoral, military and labor justices, handles more specialized cases which also have their own specific procedures.

Article 92 of the Constitution divides the judiciary into nine organs: four individual superior courts (STF, STJ, TST, CNJ), four types of courts and judges (federal regional, labor, electoral, military), and courts and judges at the state level, including the Federal District and the territories.

There is no judicial organization at the municipality level.

==== National Justice Council ====
The National Council of Justice (Note: Portuguese: Conselho Nacional de Justiça [kõˈseʎu nasi.oˈnaw dʒi ʒusˈtʃisɐ, - nasjoˈnaw -].) (CNJ) is an administrative and oversight organ of the Brazilian Judiciary created by constitutional amendment in 2004 as a part of judicial reform. Among its responsibilities are ensuring that the judicial system remains autonomous, conducting disciplinary proceedings against members of the Judiciary, and compiling and publishing statistics on the Brazilian court system. The Council has nationwide jurisdiction over all courts except the Supreme Federal Court, but makes no rulings on cases and does not review judgements of other courts. Its fifteen members are chosen by the Supreme Federal Court for two-year terms.

==== Superior courts ====
Article 92 of the Constitution named five superior courts. They are: the Supreme Federal Court, the Superior Court of Justice, the Superior Labor Court, the Superior Electoral Court, and the Superior Military Court. Magistrates who make up these courts are called ministers.

===== Supreme Federal Court =====
The Supreme Federal Court is the constitutional court of Brazil. An attempt was made without success at the Constitutional Assembly of 1988 to create this court, and again in 1992 as part of the greater push for judiciary reform. It finally became law 12 years later.

In May 2009 The Economist called the Supreme Federal Court

"the most overburdened court in the world, thanks to a plethora of rights and privileges entrenched in the country's 1988 constitution (...) till recently the tribunal's decisions did not bind lower courts. The result was a court that is overstretched to the point of mutiny. The Supreme Court received 100,781 cases last year."

===== Superior Court of Justice =====
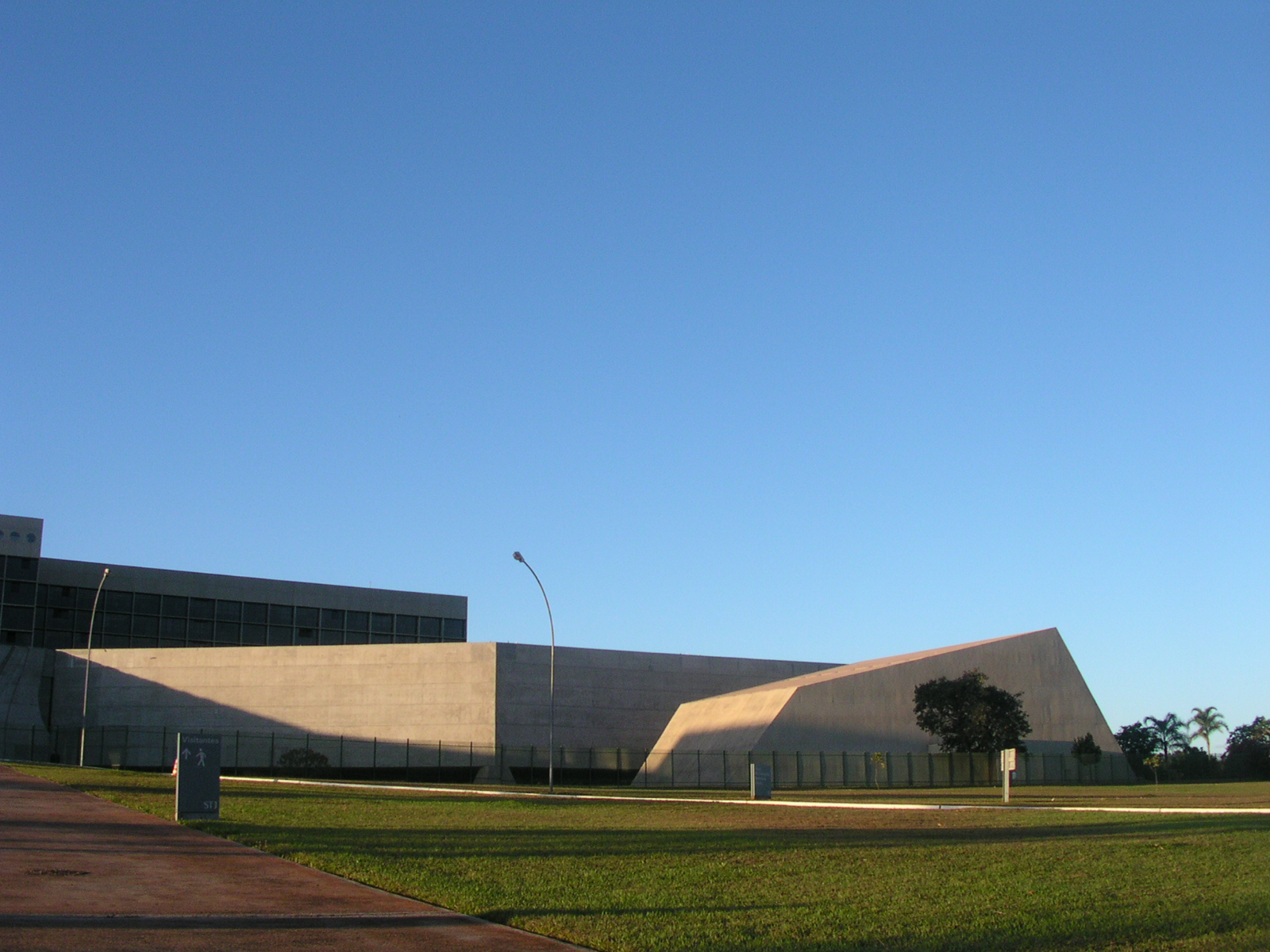
Superior Court of Justice in Brasília

The Superior Court of Justice (Portuguese: Superior Tribunal de Justiça, also known as STJ, IPA: [ˌɛsiteˈʒɔtɐ]) is the highest appellate court in Brazil for non-constitutional issues regarding federal law. The STJ also has original jurisdiction over some cases. Its jurisdiction is provided for in Article 105 of the Brazilian Constitution.

===== Superior Labor Court =====
The Superior Labor Court (Portuguese: Tribunal Superior do Trabalho, TST), is the highest Brazilian appellate court for labor law issues. Its headquarters are located in Brasília, near the American Embassy.

It is one of the five high courts in Brazil, the highest instance in the Brazilian federalized labor courts system, which includes the Regional Labor Courts (Tribunais Regionais do Trabalho - TRT's), at common appeal level, and the Trial Labor Courts (Varas do Trabalho) in the first instance.

The origin of the court was the National Labor Council, created in 1923, which was a part of the executive branch, subordinated to the Ministry of Agriculture, Industry and Commerce.

On 18 September 1946, the council was transformed into the Tribunal Superior do Trabalho. The Brazilian Constitution adopted that year recognized the TST as part of the judiciary branch, no longer subordinated to the executive. That status was retained by all subsequent constitutions.

===== Superior Electoral Court =====
The Superior Electoral Court (Brazilian Portuguese: Tribunal Superior Eleitoral, TSE) is the highest body of the Brazilian Electoral Justice, which also comprises one Regional Electoral Court (Brazilian Portuguese: Tribunal Regional Eleitoral, TRE) in each of the 26 states and the Federal District of the country, as determined by the Article 118 of the Constitution of Brazil.

==== Federal Regional Courts ====
The Regional Federal Courts (in Portuguese, Tribunais Regionais Federais, commonly called TRFs) are the courts of appeal in the Federal Courts of Brazil, the second instance courts of the Brazilian federal justice system, responsible not only for appeals of trial court decisions, but also for writs of security, habeas corpus, and habeas data against acts by federal judges, motions to set aside judgments, criminal revisions, and conflicts of jurisdiction. Article 108 of the Brazilian Constitution defines the jurisdiction of the Federal Regional Courts.

They have a varied composition, but the number of judges is defined by law. One fifth are chosen by lawyers with 10 years experience or more, as well as by members of the Public Prosecutor's Office, also known as the "Federal Public Ministry" (Ministério Público Federal) with ten years experience or more. The rest of the judges are appointed through the promotion of federal judges with over five years experience, by longest service time and by merit, alternately.

In each tribunal is a Regional Office for Internal Affairs of Federal Justice (Corregedoria Regional da Justiça Federal), responsible for corrections, inspections, and investigations at first instance. The internal affairs offices are also in charge of hiring processes, and instruction towards a uniformization of jurisdictional activity and forensic service. They are each run by a regional director, with a possible vice-director.

==== State courts ====
===== Trial courts =====
Each state territory is divided into judicial districts, called comarcas, composed of one or more municipalities. The 27 Courts of Justice have their headquarters in the capital of each state and have jurisdiction only over their State territories. The Federal District only presents the federal-level judicial branch. Each comarca has at least one trial court, a court of first instance. Each court of first instance has a law judge and a substitute judge. The judge decides alone in all civil cases and in most criminal cases. Only intentional crimes against life are judged by jury. The judges of the courts are nominated after a selection process. There are specialized first-instance courts for family litigation or bankruptcy in some comarcas. Judgments from these district courts may be subject to judicial review following appeals to the courts of second instance.

===== Courts of justice =====
The highest court of a state judicial system is its court of second instance, the Courts of Justice. In each Brazilian state, there is one Court of Justice (Tribunal de Justiça in Portuguese). Courts of Justice are courts of appeal, meaning they can review decisions made by trial courts and have the final word on state-level decisions, though federal courts may overturn those decisions. Some states, such as São Paulo and Minas Gerais, used to have a Court of Appeals (Tribunal de Alçada in Portuguese) which had a different jurisdiction. But article 4 of the 45th constitutional amendment to the Brazilian constitution, decreed their extinction to simplify the second instance structure.

Three judges, called desembargadores usually make second-instance judgments. These Courts are divided into civil chambers, which hear civil cases, and criminal chambers, which hear criminal cases. Judges of the Courts of Justice overview one another. A Court can expel any judge who has displayed unethical behavior.

==== Regional electoral courts ====
Regional Electoral Court (Portuguese: Tribunal Regional Eleitoral, TRE) is the judicial body that is in charge of elections at the state level in Brazil. There are 27 TREs, one for each Brazilian state, plus one for the Federal District.

According to law, the regional courts are responsible for control and inspection of the whole electoral process in their jurisdiction, from the registration of regional branches of political parties, to the production of reports and electoral maps during vote counting.

The regional courts are responsible for voter registration, for constitution of electoral districts and for reporting the results. The regional courts also settle disputes regarding elections and handle appeals of the decisions of the electoral judges.

==== Regional military courts ====
Currently, three states have Military Justice Courts: the São Paulo, Minas Gerais and Rio Grande do Sul, the first of which were created following an agreement between the federal government and the states to reorganize the military police and state military courts in 1936. With the 1988 constitution and the reaffirmation of the military status of the fire departments of the states and the Federal District, the members of these institutions are also subject to the jurisdiction of the Court of Military Justice (TJM).

The main functions of the TJM are defined in the state constitutions, but some are common and exclusive to them, such as prosecuting and judging.

=== Public prosecution ===
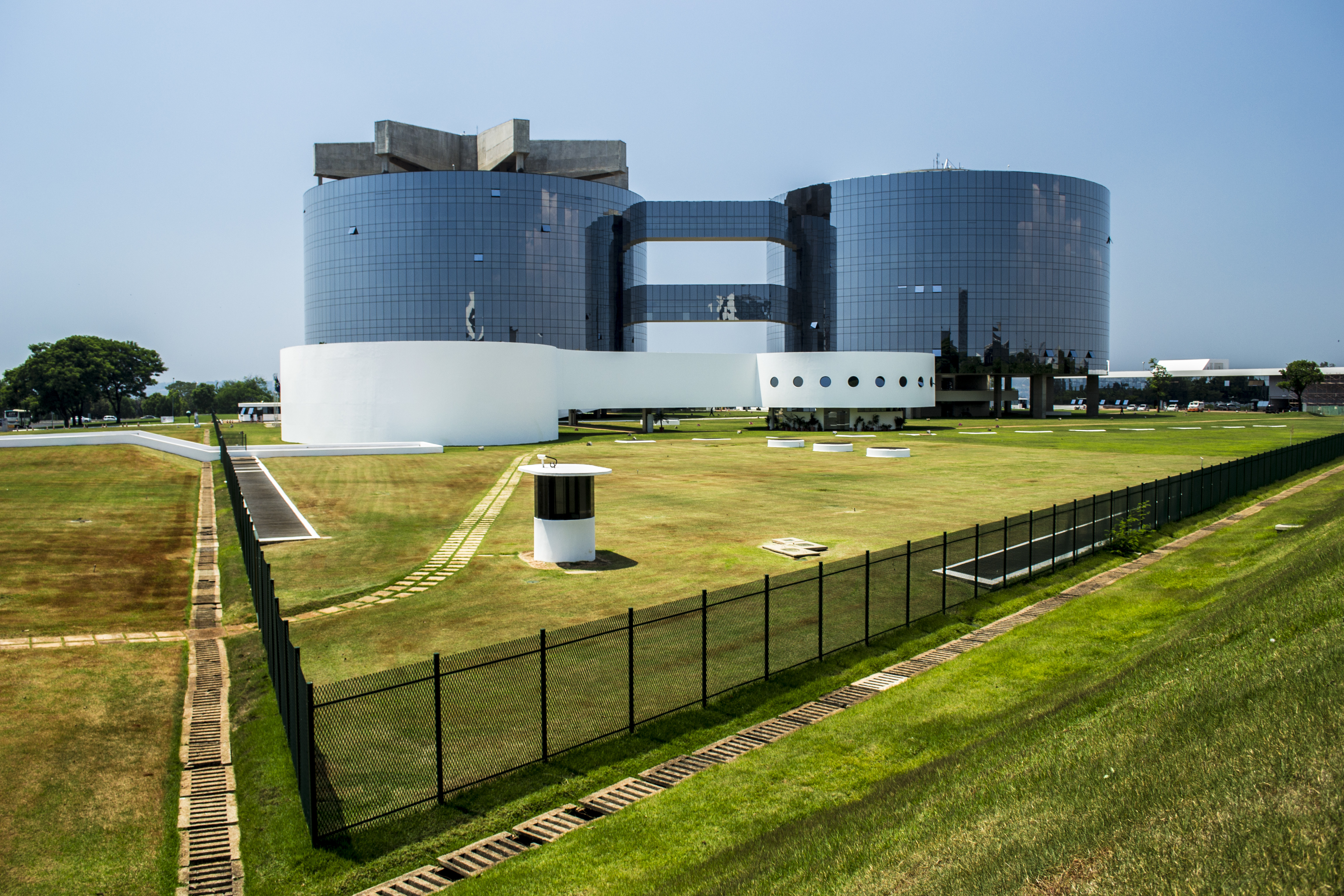
Head office of the Prosecutor General of the Brazilian Republic

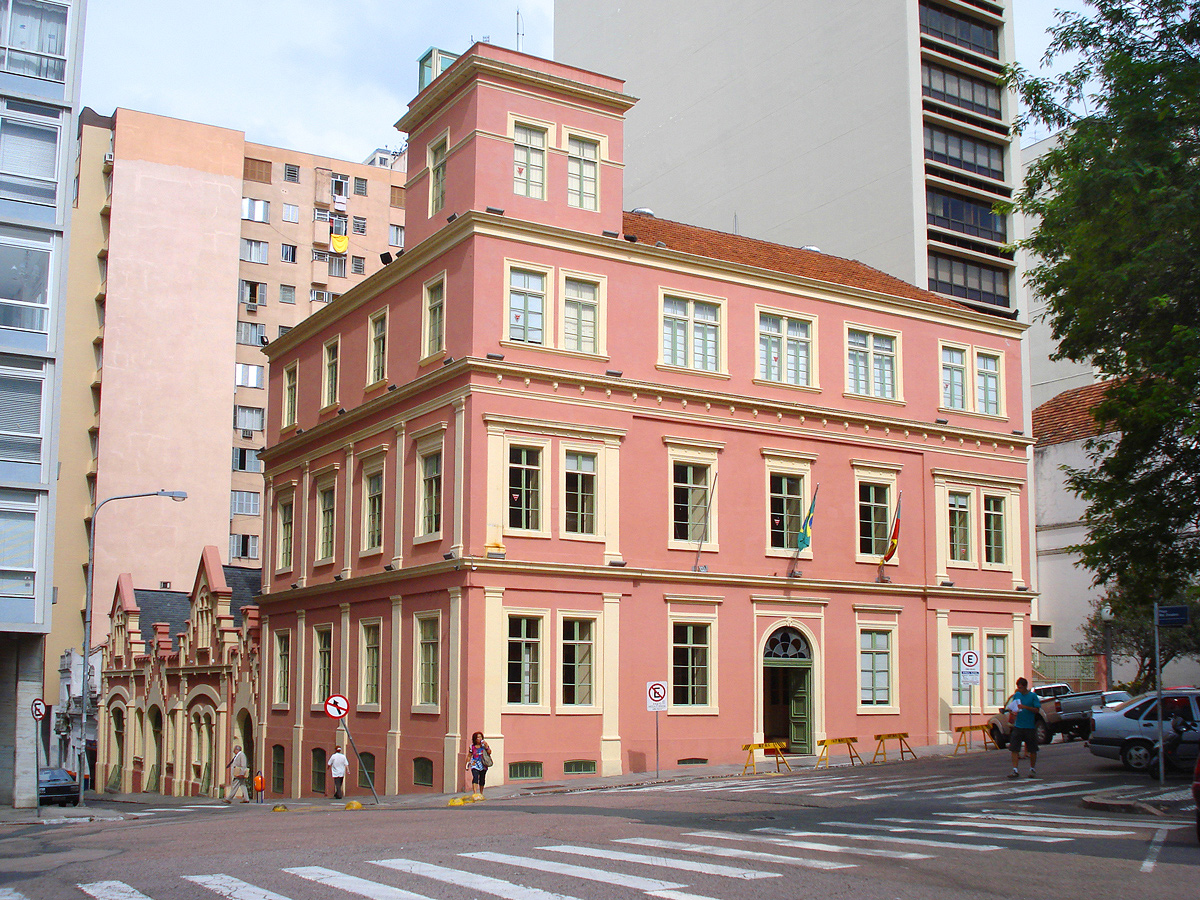
Old building of Public Ministry in Porto Alegre

The Public Prosecutor's Office (Portuguese: Ministério Público, lit. "Public Ministry", often abbreviated "MP") is the Brazilian body of independent public prosecutors at both the federal (Ministério Público da União) and state level (Ministério Público Estadual). It operates independently from the three branches of government. The Constitution of 1988 divides the functions of the Public Prosecutor's Office into three different bodies: the Public Procurator's Office, the Public Defender's Office and the Public Prosecutor's Office itself, each one of them an independent body. In addition to that, the Constitution created the Federal Court of Accounts (Tribunal de Contas da União), which is also autonomous in its functions.

There are three levels of public prosecutors, according to the jurisdiction of the courts before which they perform their duties. There are the federal prosecutors (procuradores da República) who bring cases before judges in lower courts; the appellate federal prosecutors (Procuradores Regionais da República); and the superior federal prosecutors (Subprocuradores Gerais da República). The Prosecutor General (Procurador Geral da República) heads the federal body and brings cases before the Supreme Federal Court, which handles final judicial reviews and criminal offenses committed by federal legislators, members of the cabinet, and the President of Brazil. At the state level, the body usually has three divisions: deputy state prosecutors (Promotores de Justiça Substitutos); state prosecutors before the lower courts (Promotores de Justiça Titulares); and appellate state prosecutors (Procuradores de Justiça). There are also military prosecutors (promotores militares) whose duties are related to State Military Police Corps and Military Firefighter Corps.

The Office is part of the Brazilian criminal justice system, whose task is to uphold justice. The main job of prosecutors is their duty to bring criminal charges and try criminal cases, but also to request acquittal of charges if during a trial they become convinced of a defendant's innocence. Prosecutors have the last word on whether criminal charges are filed, except in those rare cases in which Brazilian law permits civil prosecution. In those cases, the prosecutor acts as custos legis and ensures that justice is indeed delivered.

It is also mandatory that a Prosecutor to be part of litigation related to underage minors.

Although the law allows prosecutors to conduct criminal investigations, they only do so in major cases, usually where there has been wrongdoing involving the police or public officials. They are also in charge of supervising police work and police investigations. The power prosecutors have to conduct criminal investigations is controversial and, although judges, prosecutors and the general population favor it generally, it is being contested before the Supreme Federal Court. In addition to prosecuting crimes, Brazilian prosecutors are also authorized, among others, by the Brazilian constitution to bring action against private individuals, commercial enterprises and the Union, state, Federal District, and the municipal governments, in the defense of minorities, the environment, consumers and the civil society in general.

Federal Prosecution Office (MPF) database, the Car Wash investigation resulted in 361 convictions at first instance and billions of dollars in fines and financial settlements with companies involved.

=== Public defenders ===
According to the Principles of criminal law in Brazil in the Constitution, everyone has the right to a defense, and the state will provide one if the accused cannot afford one. The Office of the Federal Public Defender is the autonomous body that ensures this right.

== Police ==
=== Police roles ===
==== Judicial police ====
In Brazil, the duties of the judicial police are the responsibility of the Civil Police of the States and the Federal District and the Federal Police, in accordance with paragraphs 4 and 1 of article 144 of the Constitution.

The function of the Judicial Police dates back to 1619, when the alcaides, carrying out their activities in the towns of the Colony, carried out measures to arrest evildoers, always accompanied by a clerk who would draw up a report of what had happened for later presentation to the magistrate. Later, the figure of the "criminal minister" (ministro criminal or meirinho) emerged, who in his districts mixed the roles of judge and police officer, keeping the peace, carrying out investigations, and ordering the arrest of criminals.

Under the terms of article 144, paragraph 4, of the Constitution, "the civil police, led by career delegados, are responsible, except for those under jurisdiction of the Union (Polícia Federal), for the functions of the judicial police and the investigation of criminal offenses, except military ones." They are subordinate to the state governors, through the public security secretariats.

The investigation of criminal offenses is carried out in the course of a police inquiry as provided for in the Code of Criminal Procedure. The Police investigation is conducted independently, exclusively by the delegado, under the terms of Law No. 12.830/2013, which refers it to the appropriate criminal court after its conclusion. The Public Prosecutor's Office may request additional measures to better investigate a case in order to file a criminal action.

=== Police forces ===
There are three national police forces in Brazil: the Federal Police, Federal Highway Police, and the National Force.

==== Federal Police ====
The Federal Police of Brazil (Portuguese: Polícia Federal do Brasil) or Department of Federal Police (Portuguese: Departamento de Polícia Federal) is a federal law enforcement agency of Brazil and one of the most well-known nationwide police forces of the executive branch of Brazil. There are also Federal Highway Police and Polícia Penal Federal (Federal Prisons Police) and the polices of the capital, Brasília, Federal District, which is also organized and maintained from the federal government. In addition, Brazil has more federals polices from another powers, like the Institutional Polices from the Congress (Polícia Legislativa Federal), Federal Prosecutor’s Office Police (Polícia do MPU) and Judicial Police of the Federal Judiciary. From 1944 to 1967 it was called the Federal Public Safety Department (Portuguese: Departamento Federal de Segurança Pública).

The Federal Police Department is responsible for combating crimes against federal institutions, international drug trafficking, terrorism, cyber-crime, organized crime, public corruption, white-collar crime, money laundering, immigration, border control, airport security and maritime policing. It is subordinate to the Ministry of Justice and Public Security.

==== Military Police ====
Military Police, (Note: Portuguese: Polícia Militar, IPA: [poˈlisi.ɐ miliˈtaʁ, -sjɐ -].) also known as PM, (Note: Pronounced [peˈemi].) are the uniformed preventive state police of the states and Federal District of Brazil. The Military Police units are the main ostensive police force at the state level and are responsible for policing and maintaining the public order. Their formations, rules and uniforms vary depending on the state. Investigative work and forensics are undertaken by the Civil Police of each state.

With the fall of the Empire, the First Brazilian Republic adopted a constitution based on the United States' one, where the federal states have a large degree of autonomy. The Police Corps began to be administered by the states and became small state armies, with infantry, cavalry, artillery, and later, even air forces. This danger to national security remained until the end of World War II, with the deposition of the dictatorial government of Getúlio Vargas.

After World War II, the Military Police became a more "traditional" police force, similar to a gendarmerie, subject to the states.

==== National Police ====
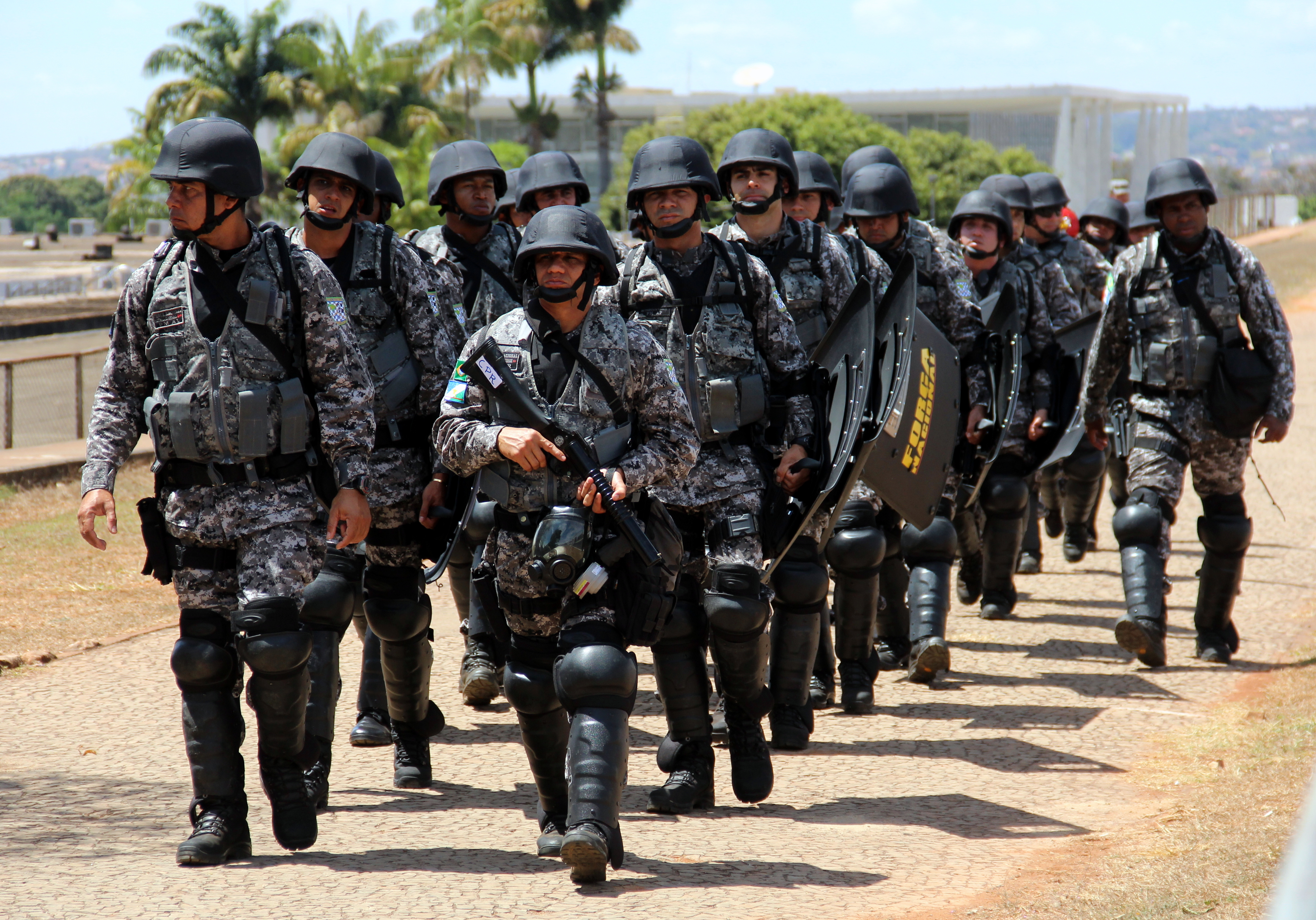
Agents of the National Public Security Force active.

The National Public Security Force (Portuguese: Força Nacional de Segurança Pública, FNSP), or National Force (Força Nacional) was created in 2004 and is headquartered in Brasília, in the Federal District, as a joint cooperation of various Brazilian Public Safety forces, co-ordinated by the National Secretariat of Public Security (Secretaria Nacional de Segurança Pública - SENASP), of the Ministry of Justice and Public Security. It was created during the administration of President Luiz Inácio Lula da Silva, as a concept developed by then Minister of Justice, Márcio Thomaz Bastos.

The National Force is composed of the most qualified civil and military police personnel, military firefighters and experts loaned from each of the states of Brazil. It is deployed in cases of major security crisis to augment local security forces by the request of local authorities. It is similar in its regiment, action, and use to the USA's National Guard.

==== Civil Police ====
The Civilian Police are agencies of the public administration of the states and of the Federal District of Brazil, whose function is, under Article 144 of the Federal Constitution of 1988, public security and the preservation of the public order, the safety of the people and of the patrimony.

Each of the states and the Federal District has its own civilian police department, which carries out detective work, forensics and criminal investigation, acting as a state bureau of investigation, while the "military police" carry out preventive police duties. Some states also have a "Scientific Police" specialized in forensic science and working together, but separate from the institution of the Civil Police.

It aims at the exercise of functions of judiciary police and the exercise of activities of administrative and security police, which are indispensable to the preservation of the juridical order, to the (promotion of the) harmonic life of the community, and to guarantee citizens' rights and liberty.

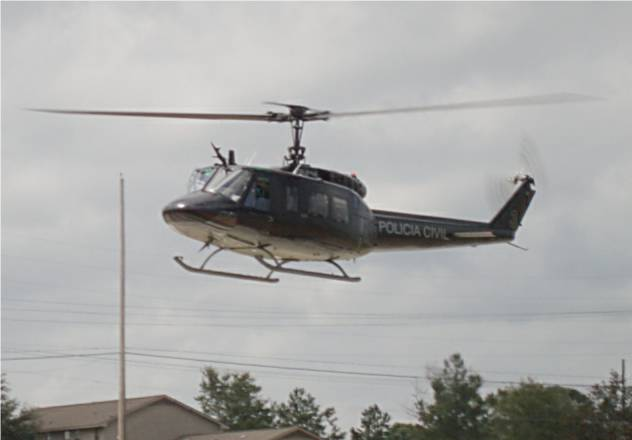
Police helicopter - Rio de Janeiro

== Correctional system ==
=== Prisons and detention centers ===
==== Types ====
There are three types, or "regimes", of prisons in Brazil:

- closed regime – the most restrictive type of the three, it is for the most serious crimes (sentences over eight years) and includes confinement to a cell with limited or no access to outside opportunities, as in the more relaxed regimes.
- semi-open regime – offers some limited opportunities outside the prison, but requires the inmate to return to a dorm-like barracks every night.
- open regime – the least restrictive regime, more similar to work-release in that inmates may not have to be confined to a prison but have certain restrictions on their freedom such as reporting regularly to an officer of the court, attending required workshops, and not leaving their area of residence.

==== Conditions ====
Forced to provide their own mattresses, bedding, clothing and toiletries, many prisoners are dependent on the support of their families or others outside the prison. The struggle for space, and the authorities' failure to provide basic provisions in many facilities, leads to prisoner-on-prisoner exploitation, as prisoners who lack money and family support are victimized by others.

Brazilian prisoners face awful living conditions. Overcrowding is endemic, with many facilities holding two to five times as many prisoners as designed for. Because of this, many sleep on the floor, or with no floor space, tie themselves to cell bars or hang in suspended hammocks. Prisoners are expected to provide their own clothing, mattresses, toiletries, and thus are dependent on outside support; this leads to contention and exploitation among the prisoners for scarce resources.

Prisons come in different sizes, with several having over 1,000 prisoners, though the Standard Minimum Rules recommend that prisons hold no more than 500 inmates.The Carandiru prison complex in São Paulo, Latin America's largest, the Casa de Detenção, which held 6,508 when Human Rights Watch visited it in 1998. Most are much smaller, with several hundred inmates each. Most penal facilities are physically deteriorated, some severely.

Only China and the United States have larger person populations than Brazil. Its 811,000 inmates are a result of a 170% increase in incarceration between 2000 and 2015.

Massive overcrowding has resulted, in a prison system where conditions are deplorable by tradition.

Prison violence frequently spills over to the outside world.

=== Juvenile offender facilities ===
Youths are not punished under the penal code, but under the Brazilian Statute of the Child and Adolescent.

While some politicians, notably Sergio Cabral, have argued for lowering the age of criminal responsibility from the current eighteen in a get-tough-on-crime measure, opponents have so far prevented this.

=== Rehabilitation programs ===
Criminal rehabilitation is provided for in article 94 of the Brazilian Penal Code, and plays a crucial role in the resocialization of ex-convicts.

Article 94 establishes that criminal rehabilitation is a right for convicts who have served their sentence and met certain legal requirements. According to the article, the purpose of the rehabilitation process is to declare the end of the criminal and social effects of conviction, enabling the ex-convict to regain their full civil and political rights.

By providing a return to civil and political rights, the process allows individuals to rebuild their lives in a dignified and productive way. The Brazilian legal system invests in rehabilitation programs, offering support and opportunities for ex-convicts to reintegrate into the community and contribute positively to society. Criminal rehabilitation is intended to represent a path towards justice, resocialization and the construction of a more inclusive and supportive society.

There are many problems with rehabilitation, the most serious of which is overcrowding.

== Legislation ==
The penal code and the Code of criminal procedure are defined by legislation. The penal code defines what actions or omissions are crimes, and establishes punishments. The Code of criminal procedure defines procedural issues: the role of the police, prosecutors, and courts; who carries out criminal investigation and under what circumstances; formalities of arrest, rights of defendants, rules of evidence, trial procedure, judicial process and decisions, and the administration of sentences.

=== Penal Code ===
The current Penal Code of Brazil (Portuguese: Código Penal brasileiro) was promulgated in 1940, during the Estado Novo regime, and has been in effect since January 1, 1942. It is the third codification of criminal law in the country's history, succeeding those of 1830 and 1890. One notable feature of the document is the inclusion of libel as a crime.

After the end of the Vargas Era in 1945–46, a new constitution was created, but the Penal Code of 1940 was not abolished. There was an unsuccessful attempt to replace it with a new one in 1969, during the military government. An extensive reform of the Code was proposed in 1973 and successively postponed until it was revoked in 1978. Another commission to overhaul the Code was formed in 1980. The reform finally took place in 1984, one year before the end of the military government.

Recent modifications include a redefinition of "sexual crimes" in 2009, and the inclusion of feminicide in 2015.

=== Code of criminal procedure ===
The Brazilian Code of Criminal Procedure (CPP) governs Brazilian criminal proceedings. The National Congress legislates on criminal procedure. Its purpose is to organize the system of criminal justice originating in the penal Code of Brazil and other miscellaneous legislation.

The current code was written by Francisco Campos and instituted by Decree-law No. 3,689 of 1941, by then President Getúlio Vargas, with 811 articles. It went into effect 1 January 1942.

==== Code reform ====
The current Code of Criminal Procedure, in force since the Third Brazilian Republic (Estado Novo) period, and the 1988 Brazilian Constitution. Some legislative changes were made in 2008, but the Senate, dissatisfied, established a committee to develop a new Code, whose draft was delivered on 22 April 2009.

=== Special criminal laws ===
The Comissão parlamentar de inquérito, (Parliamentary investigative commission), or parliamentary commission of inquiry. For example, "CPI da Petrobras" ("Petrobras CPI"). See #CPI da Petrobras.

==== Drug laws ====
In 2025, Brazil recorded 34,086 homicides, down from 38,374 homicides reported in 2024. This decline continues a trend that began in 2020, with a 25% reduction in homicides since then. The homicide rate in Brazil for 2025 was 16 per 100,000 inhabitants, the lowest in over a decade.

==== Organized crime laws ====
In June 2023, a former senior police chief in the Amazon warned that organized crime groups in the Amazon were heavily armed and growing rapidly, and warned of dire consequence for the entire area if they were allowed to grow into powerful armies as had occurred in Colombia.

Prison gangs based in three major cities have expanded beyond prison walls and become nationwide criminal enterprises. In São Paulo, the First Capital Command (Primeiro Comando da Capital, PCC) and Rio de Janeiro's Red Command (Comando Vermelho, CV) have expanded throughout the country. The Northern Family (Família do Norte, FDN) is active in northern states and some neighboring countries, and controls the lucrative drug trading route through the Amazon.

==== Cybercrime laws ====
Estelionato ("confidence game") is the crime of obtaining for oneself or someone else an unlawful advantage (vantagem indevida) to the detriment of others, by misleading someone by deception or any other fraudulent means. One of several crimes that are considered a "Crime contra o patrimônio". See Penal code, and Article 171. (Estelionato has a secondary meaning of "phishing" in the context of e-mail spam.)

== Criminal procedure ==
A newly adopted law introduced 'rewarded collaboration' (colaboração premiada) (Note: Colaboração premiada – literally, "rewarded collaboration"; the common name for the legal process known as delação premiada.) (Note: Delação premiada – "rewarded whistleblowing" (or, "informing"). A legal process by which a suspect is offered a specific reduced sentence prescribed by law, in return for turning in accomplices, or aiding in investigations. The common name for it in Brazil is colaboração premiada ("rewarded collaboration"). The concept is similar to a plea bargain, in return for investigative assistance.) a type of plea bargaining involving sentence reductions for defendants who cooperate in investigations. Costa's deposition showed which political parties controlled Petrobras.

=== Arrest and detention ===
Prisão preventiva ('preventive detention') is a pre-trial, preventive detention defined by CPP §311–316. pre-trial remand. It is a type of preventive detention, which may be used in the investigation of a serious crime. A 1989 law replaced the former prisão por averiguação (investigatory detention) which was found to be contrary to fundamental rights defined in the 1988 Constitution. Only used in certain high crimes where the subject might impede the investigation if not detained, or where they have no fixed address or their identity cannot be established.

It is a preventive measure declared by a judicial authority, and the maximum measure that someone suspected but not convicted of a crime is subject to. The measure is taken only when strictly necessary, in order to prevent an accused from committing additional crimes or to prejudice a case in progress (destruction of evidence, intimidation of witnesses, etc.). It can be declared in any phase of the process, from the initial police investigation phase, or the trial investigation (see law 12.403/2011).

=== Pre-trial proceedings ===
Pre-trial detainees make up nearly 40 percent of the prisoners in Brazilian prisons. Less than half of these prisoners are eventually convicted.

==== Bail and pretrial release ====
Because the public defender system is chronically understaffed, 40 percent of prisoners in Brazil are detainees awaiting trial or sentencing. This is exacerbated by the tendency of judges not to apply available alternatives for non-violent crimes. In the state of Amazonas, the percentage of inmates in pre-trial detention is above 70 percent. This results in many detainees awaiting trial are held in the same facilities as convicted prisoners.

A visit by Human Rights Watch to a prison in the northeastern state of Maranhão found that many prisoners wait months to see a judge. During that time, they face intense pressure to join one of the violent prison gangs for their own safety. The understaffed and underfunded prisons leave new inmates at the mercy of the system, and make the prisons into a recruiting system for the criminal gangs already operating within the prisons.

==== Preliminary investigations ====
Preliminary investigations are carried out by the police forces of the State (polícias estaduais) under the State Public Attorney Ministério Público Estadual), and by the federal police (polícia federal) of the Union (União) under the Federal Public Attorney (Ministério Público da União). These responsibilities are defined in Article 144 of the Constitution.

The police investigation (inquérito policial) is considered to be an administrative procedure intended to establish what offense has been committed, and who committed, as a basis for possible future prosecution. The investigation can be initiated by the victim, by police authorities who become aware of an offense, or by government representatives such as the State or Federal Public Prosecutor's Office, or by judges. The actual inquiry procedure is not specified by law, other than the goal to clarify the facts so that they may be handed off to the next stage of the process and is at the discretion of police authorities.

Both the victim and the accused have rights during the investigation, including the right to request investigation of anything that will help bring out the facts of the case (per Article 14 of the Code of Criminal Procedure) and to request seizure of assets of the accused to insure payment of any damages accorded to the victim (per Article 125).

When all the facts of the case have been gathered by the investigation, the police prepare a report (inquérito) which is handed over to the Delegado, who is a member of the police force whose role combines aspects of that of a sheriff and a crown prosecutor. The Delegado receives the report, and in the next phase of the process will examine it and decide whether or not to proceed with a prosecution based on the facts of the case.

=== Trial process ===
==== Adversarial system ====
Brazil has adopted the adversarial system as its legal system. It is also known as the accusatorial system (Brazilian Portuguese: sistema acusatorio ) because there is a clear separation between the accusatory function of the Public Prosecutor's Office (Ministério Público ) in prosecuting and judging crimes. This is one of three systems of criminal procedure, the others being the inquisitorial system, and the hybrid system (sistema misto ). In the adversarial system, the functions of prosecution, defense, and judgment are carried out by different individuals or teams. The principle of contraditório e ampla defesa (audi alteram partem) meaning both sides get to present and challenge evidence, goes back to the Magna Carta and is very important in this system and is grounded in Article 5, section LV of the Constitution. Because the prosecution has the initiative in beginning the proceedings in the adversarial system, the defense has the right to be heard last. Provision of evidence is the responsibility of both parties.

There has been some debate about whether Brazil uses the adversarial system or a hybrid system (sistema misto ) consisting of a mix of features from both the adversarial and inquisitorial systems. Those claiming the latter say that there are some features of the inquisitorial system either during the initial investigation or because of special circumstances whereby the judge may furnish evidence (per articles 156, 212, and 404 of the CPP), or call witnesses (testemunhas do juiz ). Another argument states that since the adversarial system in Brazil dates to 1941, thus falling under the Constitution of 1937, at the time criminal procedure had a clear, inquisitorial aspect that has held over in part. Some say that given the guarantees in the 1988 Constitution and later laws such as Law 13.964/2019 it's clear that system now tends more towards the adversarial system, and most others say given constitutional guarantees and the CPP limiting the state in criminal matters, there is no longer any doubt that Brazil is currently under the adversarial system.

==== Roles of primary actors ====
===== Prosecutors =====
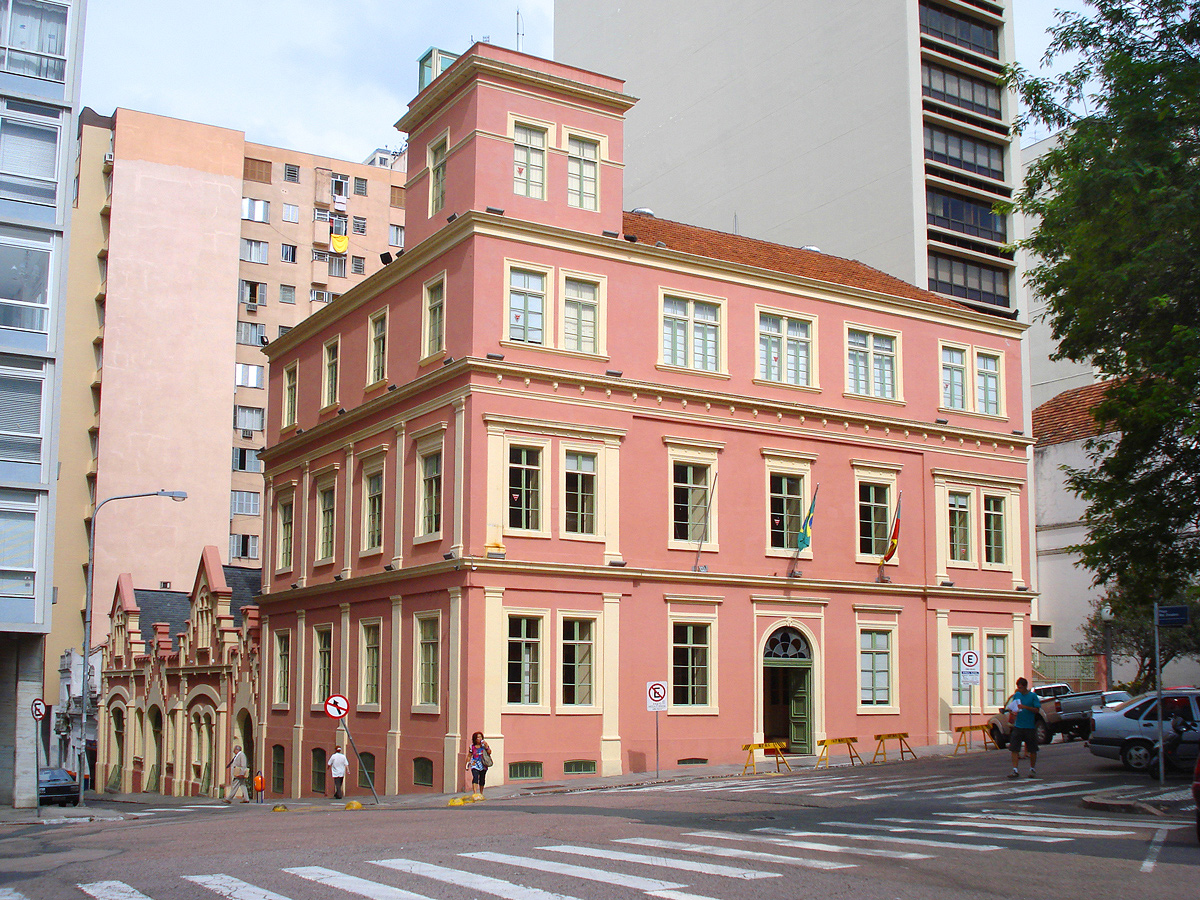
Old building of Public Ministry in Porto Alegre

There are three levels of public prosecutors, according to the jurisdiction of the courts before which they perform their duties. There are the federal prosecutors (procuradores da República) who bring cases before judges in lower courts; the appellate federal prosecutors (Procuradores Regionais da República); and the superior federal prosecutors (Subprocuradores Gerais da República). The Prosecutor General (Procurador Geral da República) heads the federal body and brings cases before the Supreme Federal Court, which handles final judicial reviews and criminal offenses committed by federal legislators, members of the cabinet, and the President of Brazil. At the state level, the body usually has three divisions: deputy state prosecutors (Promotores de Justiça Substitutos); state prosecutors before the lower courts (Promotores de Justiça Titulares); and appellate state prosecutors (Procuradores de Justiça). There are also military prosecutors (promotores militares) whose duties are related to State Military Police Corps and Military Firefighter Corps.

The Office is part of the Brazilian criminal justice system, whose task is to uphold justice. The main job of prosecutors is their duty to bring criminal charges and try criminal cases, but also to request acquittal of charges if during a trial they become convinced of a defendant's innocence. Prosecutors have the last word on whether criminal charges are filed, except in those rare cases in which Brazilian law permits civil prosecution. In those cases, the prosecutor acts as custos legis and ensures that justice is indeed delivered.

Although the law allows prosecutors to conduct criminal investigations, they only do so in major cases, usually where there has been wrongdoing involving the police or public officials. They are also in charge of supervising police work and police investigations. The power prosecutors have to conduct criminal investigations is controversial and, although judges, prosecutors and the general population favor it generally, it is being contested before the Supreme Federal Court. In addition to prosecuting crimes, Brazilian prosecutors are also authorized, among others, by the Brazilian constitution to bring action against private individuals, commercial enterprises and the Union, state, Federal District, and the municipal governments, in the defense of minorities, the environment, consumers and the civil society in general.

===== Others =====
In Brazil, an expert criminal witness (perito criminal) is a public servant, police officer or not, who may play a legal role in a criminal trial. Specialized in finding or providing technical or expert evidence through scientific analysis of traces left behind in the commission of a crime. Crime scene experts analyze crime scenes, identifying, recording, collecting, interpreting and storing evidence, and are responsible for establishing the dynamics and suspected perpetrators of crimes and providing the evidence that will be used during criminal proceedings.

== Challenges and issues ==
Brazil's colonial past as a plantation economy built on forced labor continues to permeate its society today and contributes to an otherization of labour.

While a majority of the brazilian prison population is represented by a public defender, that institution has been called "incapable of making the justice system observe, in due course, the most ordinary rights of a convict."

=== Amazon ===
Drug cartels ship cocaine into Brazil in the poorly policed border area where Peru, Brazil, and Colombia meet. Expansion of coca cultivation on the Peruvian side since 2019 has resulted in increased criminal activity and violence, including murder, in the Tres Fronteras region. In 2022 a Peruvian police outpost was pillaged and burned, and the authorities in all three countries are overwhelmed and ill-equipped to fight the well-financed and well-armed drug cartels that effectively control this area of the Amazon, where 120 tons of cocaine are trafficked into Brazil yearly.

=== Impunity ===
Political Capture in the Petrobras Corruption Scandal: The Sad Tale of an Oil Giant Monica Arruda de Almeida and Bruce Zagaris The Fletcher Forum of World Affairs Vol. 39, No. 2, Lights Out For Oil? The Climate After Paris (SUMMER 2015), pp. 87–99 (13 pages) Published By: The Fletcher School of Law and Diplomacy Political Capture in the Petrobras Corruption Scandal: The Sad Tale of an Oil Giant Media Leaks and Corruption in Brazil: The Infostorm of Impeachment and the Lava-Jato Scandal], Damgaard, Mads Bjelke, Taylor & Francis, 2018.

Caixa 2 slush fund (lit. "cashbox two") unrecorded funds typically used as a slush fund for bribery or money laundering.

=== Overcrowding in prisons ===
Mass incarceration and overcrowding created a fertile ground for the spread of prison gangs and the related cocaine trade through the Amazon

"Brazil's prison violence is legendary" according to NPR. "The homicide rate for inmates is six times higher than the national average." Only some prisoners are faced with it however, since those that meet certain criteria are guaranteed a secure cell of their own and sometimes even house arrest.

Carandiru Penitentiary

Tracking the spread of tuberculosis in Brazilian prisons Tracking the spread of tuberculosis in Brazilian prisons: Stanford infectious disease expert Jason Andrews has spent years studying the spread of tuberculosis in crowded Brazilian prisons and surrounding communities — an overlooked global health crisis.

December 16, 2021 - By Krista Conger two rival gangs of drug trafficking, the Primeiro Comando da Capital (PCC) and the Família do Norte (NDF) (allied to the Comando Vermelho (CV)) clashed in what was considered the most violent massacre in the history of the Brazilian prison system since the slaughter of Carandiru (1992).

=== Corruption and police misconduct ===
Corruption is so prevalent in Brazil that it has developed a specialized vocabulary. For example the verb malufar, to steal public money is derived from a politician legendary for graft the verb malufar was created, meaning "to steal public money", was coined from the family name of Paulo Maluf, a long-time politician notorious both for his graft and his impunity.

Undue advantage

Illicit funds. The term undue advantage is a literal translation of vantagem indevida, from a type of corruption called Recebimento de vantagem indevida: literally, "Receipt of undue advantage" (or "improper gain", etc.) This is a form of corruption, either active (corrupção ativa) or passive (corrupção passiva) involving payment or receipt of improper advantage (economic or otherwise) or the promise of it, from someone in public office, or before or after their term of office if related to their function while in office. The term comes up in several places in the CPP, including article 217 (regarding corrupção passiva), article 316 (concussão), article 333 (corrupção ativa), and others.

=== Inequality and access to justice ===
"...members of Jair Bolsonaro's far-right government portrayed the crime as the fruit of a local conflict unconnected to the devastation inflicted on the Amazon by his anti-environmental policies and dismantling of Indigenous protections."

Source: O mito da justiça penal igualitária no Brasil

== Recent reforms and initiatives ==
Constitutional and legislative reforms since the late 1980s have greatly strengthened the judicial system in Brazil, enabling successful prosecution of major corruption cases. The reforms chiefly responsible for this new power in the judiciary include the introduction of plea bargaining, creation of new institutions with oversight power over the judiciary and the Public Prosecutor's Office; competitive, merit-based selection of judges and prosecutors; greater autonomy for the Federal Public Ministry and the Federal Police, and greater access to public office for citizens.

Some of these reforms are incorporated in the 1988 Brazilian Constitution and some stem from legislative initiatives. These have led to huge improvements in the efficiency of the system, especially since the 1990s, and have enabled very major criminal investigations to take place, such as Operation Car Wash which discovered widespread, major corruption and led to the levy of three billion dollars in fines against major corporations, and the arrest of hundreds of people, including numerous politicians up to the highest levels, including governors, senators, and two presidents, in the largest scandal in the country's history, which received worldwide attention.

=== Anti-corruption measures ===
Acordo de leniência is a leniency agreement between a company and legal authorities. A company enters into this type of agreement in order to reduce their exposure to fines for criminal activity in exchange for something; typically an agreement to assist in investigations. It is part of the Anti-Corruption Act (also known as the Clean Company act), a law enacted in 2014 targeting corrupt practices in Brazil. It defines civil and administrative penalties, as well as the possibility of reductions in penalties for cooperation with law enforcement under a written leniency agreement.

Chapter 5 of the Anti-Corruption Act provides the legal underpinning for companies to enter into leniency agreements with the authorities. It is similar to delação premiada in its plea bargaining aspect, except that a leniency accord deals with a company's assets not its employees (as seen with the Odebrecht leniency agreement).

== International cooperation and extradition ==
=== Bilateral and multilateral agreements ===
Anderson Torres

=== Extradition process ===
Extradition can be requested both for the purpose of investigating or prosecuting a criminal case to which the person being extradited is subject (investigative extradition) and for the purpose of carrying out a sentence already imposed (executory extradition). Extradition requires a pre-trial detention order or a definitive sentence involving deprivation of liberty and must be requested by the Judiciary.

Active extradition is when the Brazilian government requests the extradition of a fugitive from Brazilian justice to another country, and passive extradition, when another country requests the extradition of a fugitive in Brazilian territory. A request for extradition is not limited to countries with which Brazil has an extradition treaty. It can be requested by any country and for any country. Where there is no treaty, the request must be accompanied by documents as provided for by the law.

The authority for carrying out measures of extradition and transferring convicted persons is in the Department of Asset Recovery and International Legal Cooperation of the National Secretariat of Justice of the Ministry of Justice and Public Security (Departamento de Recuperação de Ativos e Cooperação Jurídica Internacional da Secretaria Nacional de Justiça do Ministério da Justiça e Segurança Pública) (DRCI/Senajus), the Brazilian Central Authority for international legal cooperation.

Article 5 of the Constitution prohibits the extradition of native-born Brazilians, but makes an exception for naturalized citizens. Nevertheless, this does not imply impunity for Brazilians who have committed crimes abroad. Brazilian law provides for international cooperation where the country where the crime was committed can ask the Brazilian authorities for legal cooperation for criminal prosecution in Brazil, according to Brazilian law. Proceedings can be opened in Brazil and the individual tried locally as if they had committed the crime in Brazil.

The United States has an extradition treaty with Brazil passed in 1961.

Brazil was involved in a US–Russia extradition fight involving Wall Street Journal reporter Evan Gershkovich who was detained in Russia as an alleged spy.

== Notable cases and landmark decisions ==
As a result of the 2023 Brazilian Congress attack Brazil's Electoral Court system has barred Jair Bolsonaro from again becoming president until at least 2030.

Impeachment of Dilma Rousseff

=== High-profile criminal cases ===
==== Operation Car Wash ====
Operation Car Wash (Operação Lava Jato) was a vast, multi-year investigation (2014–2022) which uncovered a massive corruption scheme in the Brazilian federal government, particularly in state-owned enterprises such as oil giant Petrobras, and conglomerates like Odebrecht. The investigation was conducted through a joint task force of agents in the federal police and other agencies, and evidence was collected and presented to the courts by a teamled by Deltan Dallagnol, to lead judge Sergio Moro who was in charge of the operation. This spread from federal prosecutors and judges to related cases under their jurisdictions in various Brazilian states. The operation implicated leading businessmen, federal congressmen, senators, state governors, federal government ministers, three former presidents, and numerous foreign countries. Companies and individuals accused of involvement agreed to pay 25 billion reais ($6.8 billion USD) in fines and restitution of embezzled public funds.

According to investigators, political appointees in state-owned enterprises systematically extorted bribes from private-sector suppliers. Part of these bribes was channeled to political parties in order to illegally fund political campaigns as well as for personal gain. The largest amounts of bribes were detected in oil giant Petrobras; company directors negotiated with contractors to receive illegal kickbacks ranging from 1% to 5% of disbursements.

==== Journalists disappear in Amazon ====
British reporter Dom Phillips and Bruno Pereira disappeared in 2022 in the Javari Valley region of the Amazon, a remote area known for its lawlessness.

==== Homicide at the Senate ====
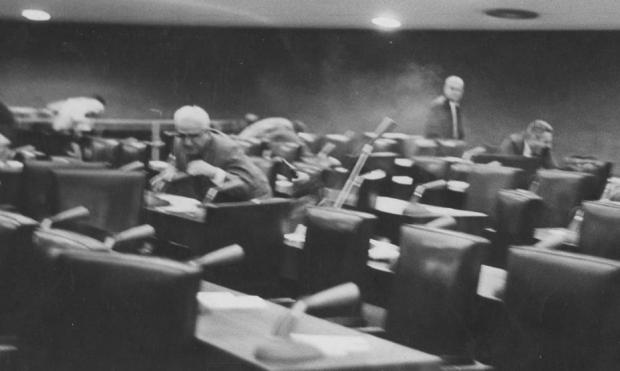
Photograph depicting the moment after the incident

The homicide at the Brazilian Federal Senate occurred on December 4, 1963 inside the Brazilian Federal Senate, at Brasília. The event involved a shooting carried out by senator Arnon de Melo (PDC-AL), who tried to shoot senator Silvestre Péricles (PST-AL) and ended up hitting and killing substitute Senator José Kairala (PSD-AC).

==== Attack on Congress ====
On 8 January 2023, following the defeat of then-president Jair Bolsonaro in the 2022 Brazilian general election and the inauguration of his successor Luiz Inácio Lula da Silva, a mob of Bolsonaro's supporters attacked Brazil's federal government buildings in the capital, Brasília. The mob invaded and caused deliberate damage to the Supreme Federal Court, the National Congress Palace and the Planalto Presidential Palace in the Praça dos Três Poderes (English: Three Powers Square or Three Branches of Government), seeking to violently overthrow the democratically elected president Lula, who had been inaugurated on 1 January. Many rioters said their purpose was to spur military leaders to launch a "military intervention" (related to a misinterpretation of the 142nd article of the Brazilian constitution and a euphemism for a coup d'état) and disrupt the democratic transition of power.<ref>

==== Assassination of Marielle Franco ====
Marielle Franco was a Brazilian politician, feminist, and human rights activist. Franco served as a city councillor of the Municipal Chamber of Rio de Janeiro for the Socialism and Liberty Party (PSOL) from January 2017 until her assassination on March 14, 2018, in Estácio, Rio de Janeiro. The assassins were in a car that pulled up alongside the Rio de Janeiro councilwoman's car and fired several shots, which also killed the driver. An investigation conducted by the authorities pointed to political motivations.

Franco had been an outspoken critic of police brutality and extrajudicial killings, as well as the February 2018 federal intervention by Brazilian president Michel Temer in the state of Rio de Janeiro which resulted in the deployment of the army in police operations.

=== Landmark Supreme Court rulings ===
==== Reproductive rights ====
ADI 3510: In 2008, the STF declared embryonic stem cell research legal.

On April 12, 2012, the Supreme Federal Court ruled by an 8–2 vote to legalize abortion in cases of fetuses with anencephaly, saying that children with anencephaly were biologically alive but that they were not a person, and therefore had no rights. The Catholic Church and Brazilian Pro-Life movements criticized the decision of the court, saying that even with a terminal illness, children with anencephaly also had the right to life.

In ADPF 54, the STF ruled that it did not violate the constitutional right to life. This decision was significant in shaping discussions on reproductive rights in Brazil.

==== Minority rights ====
ADI 4277 and ADPF 132: In 2011, the STF ruled in favor of same-sex marriages.

In 2020, the STF made a historic ruling forcing the Bolsonaro government to protect indigenous communities from COVID.

ADPF 186 and ADI 3330 : In 2012, the STF recognized the constitutionality of affirmative action policies in higher education. The court upheld the use of racial quotas to promote diversity and address historical inequalities in ADPF 186 in April, and ADI 3330 in May of 2012.

==== Free speech ====
ADPF 187: In 2011, the STF ruled in favor of the right of people to protest in favor of the decriminalization of drugs.

==== Others ====
Noting the reluctance of the Bolsonaro administration to investigate threats against the government, the Supreme court (STF) granted itself the power to do so.

== See also ==
- Attorney General of Brazil
- Brazilian Ministry of Justice
- Constitution of Brazil
- Coronelism
- Federal Police of Brazil
- Glossary of Brazil investigative terms
- Justice ministry
- Legitimate defense of honor
- List of federal institutions of Brazil
- List of Ministers of Justice of Brazil
- Ministry of Justice and Public Security (Brazil)
- Operation Car Wash
- Outsourcing law in Brazil
- Pacifying Police Unit
- Politics of Brazil
- Prosecutor General of Brazil
- Public Procuracy of Brazil
- Public Prosecutor's Office of Brazil
- 2023 Brazilian Congress attack

- Crime acessório
- Crime à distância
- Crime ambiental
- Crime autônomo
- Crime comissivo
- Crime complexo
- Crime comum
- Crime consumado
- Crime continuado
- Crime contra a humanidade
- Crime culposo
- Crime de dano
- Crime de fato permanente
- Crime de guerra
- Crime de lesa-majestade
- Crime de mão própria
- Crime de responsabilidade
- Crime doloso
- Crime eleitoral
- Crime formal
- Crime funcional
- Crime habitual
- Crime hediondo
- Crime impossível
- Crime instantâneo
- Crime material
- Crime organizado
- Crime passional
- Crime perfeito
- Crime permanente
- Crime plurissubsistente
- Crime político
- Crime preterdoloso
- Crime preterintencional
- Crime próprio
- Crime provocado
- Crime putativo
- Crime qualificado
- Crime sexual
- Crime simples
- Crime tentado
- Crime unissubsistente
- Crime vago
- Criminoso
- Delinquência

== Works cited ==
- Akbarzai, Sahar (5 June 2023). "Alleged 'mastermind' named in deaths of British journalist Dom Phillips and indigenous expert Bruno Pereira". CNN.
- Altieri de Moraes Pitombo, Antonio Sérgio (2011). "Criminal Law and Procedure". In Deffenti, Fabiano; Barral, Welber (eds.). Introduction to Brazilian Law (1st ed.). Alphen aan den Rijn, The Netherlands: Wolters Kluwel. ISBN 978-90-411-2506-4. OCLC 463642938. (second edition below)
- "Brazil: Authorities must investigate the killing of human rights defender Marielle Franco". Amnesty International. 15 March 2018. Archived from the original on 8 April 2018.
- Araujo Reis, Alexandre Cebrian; Rios Goncalves, Victor Eduardo (24 February 2023). Direito Processual Penal Esquematizado [Criminal Procedure Law Schematized] (in Brazilian Portuguese) (12 ed.). Saraiva Educação. ISBN 9786553626638.
- Barnett, Greg (27 June 2023). "Brazil's Three Types of Prison Regimes" (in Brazilian Portuguese). Brazil Counsel.
- "Brazil: Big rallies held after Rio politician is shot dead". BBC News. 15 March 2018. Archived from the original on 8 April 2018. "She and her driver, Anderson Pedro Gomes, were both killed, and her press officer, who was sitting in the back seat of the car, was injured. ... She was shot four times in the head, and three bullets hit Mr Gomes. ... Ms Franco, who grew up in Mare, a favela complex in the north of the city, has been an outspoken critic of the move to deploy the army and the federal police force."
- Borges de Mendonça, Andrey (2014). "The Criminal Justice System in Brazil: A Brief Account". Resource Material Series no.92. pp. 63–70.
- Casarin, Rodrigo (4 December 2019). "Há 56 anos, o pai de Fernando Collor matava um senador dentro do Congresso" [56 years ago, Fernando Collor's father killed a senator inside Congress]. Aventuras na História (in Brazilian Portuguese). Grupo Perfil.
- CNJ (2006). "O que é o CNJ" [What is the CNJ?] (in Brazilian Portuguese). Conselho Nacional de Justiça. Archived from the original on 2008-04-01.
- da Cruz Paulino, Galtiênio; Santos Schoucair, João Paulo; Ballan Junior, Octahydes (2023). Sistema Acusatório nos 35 Anos da CF/88 [The Adversarial System in the 35 Years of the Federal Constitution of 1988] (in Brazilian Portuguese). Londrina, Paraná: Thoth. ISBN 9786559596140.
- Deffenti, Fabiano; Barral, Welber, eds. (15 November 2016) [1st pub. 2011]. "Brazil in colonial times". Introduction to Brazilian Law (2nd ed.). Alphen aan den Rijn, The Netherlands: Wolters Kluwel. ISBN 978-9041-16785-9. OCLC 972639824. (1st edition above)
  - Campilongo, Celso. "Brazil in colonial times". In Deffenti & Barral (2016).
- Deodoro da Fonseca, Manoel (11 October 1890). "Legislação Informatizada - DECRETO Nº 847, DE 11 DE OUTUBRO DE 1890" [Computerized Legislation - DECREE No. 847 OF OCTOBER 11, 1890] (in Brazilian Portuguese). Brasília: Câmara dos Deputados.
- Dias, Rebeca (15 February 2020) [1 November 2015]. "Brazilian Criminological Thinking During the First Republic (1889-1930)". SSRN. research paper series. Frankfurt am Main: Max Planck Institute for Legal History and Legal Theory. ISSN 2699-0903. SSRN 2874851.
- Dias, Marvyn (20 December 2023) [2019]. "O Brasil adota o sistema acusatório e não misto, no Processo Penal" [Brazil adopts the accusatory system, not the mixed system, in criminal procedure].
- Fletcher, George P. (2001). "Criminal Theory in the Twentieth Century". Theoretical Inquiries in Law (pdf). 2. Tel Aviv University: 265–286. doi:10.2202/1565-3404.1023. ISSN 1565-3404.
- Gardiner, C.H. (27 August 2020). "In Brazil's prisons, inequality isn't just a condition. It's the law". Christian Science Monitor.
- Gimenez Stahlberg, Stephanie (28 October 2021). The Dark Side of Competition: Organized Crime and Violence in Brazil (pdf) (PhD thesis). ETD. Johns Hopkins University. Docket 0000-0002-3739-0351.
- "HRW: Behind Bars in Brazil: Physical Conditions". HRW. 1998.
- "Brazil Profile". Insight Crime. 24 November 2023.
- Jones de Souza, Audrey; Borges Mendes, Raphael; Ribeiro Bastos, Jefferson Braga (2015). Official Car Wash Operation Financial Report (PDF) (Report) (in Brazilian Portuguese). Serviço Público Federal Mj - Departamento De Polícia Federal Superintendência Regional De Polícia Federal No Paraná Setor Técnico-científico [Federal Public Service Mj - Federal Police Department Federal Police Regional Superintendence in Paraná Technical-Scientific Sector]. 2311/2015-SETEC/SR/DPF/PR.
- Juarez de Oliveira, ed. (2003). Justiça Militar e as peculiaridades do Juiz Militar na atuação jurisdicional | Autor(es): João Ronaldo Roth [Military justice and the peculiarities of the military judge in his judicial work | Author(s): João Ronaldo Roth] (book review) (in Brazilian Portuguese). Juarez de Oliveira. ISBN 978-8574-53383-4. OCLC 255481444. Archived from the original on 15 October 2009.
- Comissão de Juristas (2009). Anteprojeto de Reforma do Código de Processo Penal brasileiro [Draft of the Reform of the Criminal Procedure Code] (PDF) (Report) (in Brazilian Portuguese). Brasília: Senado Federal. Archived from the original (PDF) on 2010-02-15.
- JusBrasil (20 December 2023) [2014]. "A cooperação internacional e os brasileiros que cometem crimes no exterior" [International cooperation and Brazilians who commit crimes abroad]. JusBrasil (in Brazilian Portuguese).
- "Lei nº 192, de 17 de Janeiro de 1936" [Law 192 of 17 January 1936]. Câmara dos Deputados (in Brazilian Portuguese). Chamber of Deputies.
- Lorenzon, Geanluca (20 November 2017). "Corruption and the Rule of Law: How Brazil Strengthened Its Legal System". Cato Institute.
- Marques, Hugo (4 April 2022). "A conta da corrupção: R$ 25 bilhões já retornaram aos cofres públicos" [The corruption bill: R$25 billion already returned to public coffers]. Veja (in Brazilian Portuguese). Grupo Abril.
- Yurksaityte Mendez, Silmara (2010-07-23) [2006-09-23]. "Tipicidade e Tipo Penal". Monografias Brasil Escola. Jardim Goias.
- Ministério da Justiça e Segurança Pública (21 August 2023) [1st pub. 5 April 2016]. "Extradição" [Extradition]. Ministry of Justice and Public Security (Brazil) (in Brazilian Portuguese).
- Ministério Publico Federal (24 November 2023). "Entenda o caso — Caso Lava Jato" [Understand the case - Lava Jato case]. MPF. Ministério Publico. Archived from the original on 24 November 2023.
- Penteado, Luís Filipe (24 October 2023). "A Reabilitação Criminal segundo o Artigo 94 do Código Penal: Um Caminho para a Ressocialização" [Criminal Rehabilitation under Article 94 of the Penal Code: A Path to Resocialization]. Jusbrasil (in Brazilian Portuguese).
- Phillips, Tom; Collyns, Dan (16 June 2022). "Police losing narco war in deadly Amazon region where duo disappeared". The Guardian.
- Phillips, Tom; Watts, Jonathan (1 June 2023). "Brazilian Amazon at risk of being taken over by mafia, ex-police chief warns". The Guardian.
- Bartilotti Picanço, Lara (30 August 2019). "Brazil's Mass Incarceration Policy Has Not Stopped Crime" (in Brazilian Portuguese). Wilson Center.
- "Princípio da anterioridade da lei penal" [The principle of anteriority of criminal law] (in Brazilian Portuguese). Jus Brasil. 16 April 2009. Archived from the original on 2 December 2021.
- Ruiz, Michelle (15 March 2018). "Brazilian Activist Marielle Franco, Who Protested Police Violence, Has Been Assassinated". Vogue. Archived from the original on 8 April 2018.
- Saraiva, Jacqueline (15 March 2018). "Morte de vereadora e motorista no Rio: o que se sabe até agora" [Death of councilwoman and driver in Rio: what we know so far]. Correio Braziliense (in Brazilian Portuguese). Archived from the original on 16 March 2018.
- Savarese, Mauricio; Masionnave, Fabiano (8 June 2022). "EXPLAINER: Crime, impunity surge in Amazon's Javari Valley". AP.
- Schreiber, Mariana (23 September 2022). "Lava Jato atingiu partidos de forma proporcional, mas PT foi foco de Moro, aponta estudo" [Lava Jato affected parties proportionally, but PT was Moro's focus, study shows]. BBC News.
- Silva, Walther Afonso (20 December 2023). "O sistema carcerário brasileiro: desafios e soluções para a reabilitação e ressocialização dos detentos" [The Brazilian prison system: challenges and solutions for the rehabilitation and resocialization of inmates] (in Brazilian Portuguese).
