= Attorney General of the Union (Brazil) =

Brazilian government position

- Portuguese: Advocacia-Geral da União

Agency overview
- Formed: 3 May 1993; 33 years ago
- Type: Ministry
- Jurisdiction: Federal government of Brazil
- Headquarters: SAS, Quadra 03, Lote 05/06; Brasília, Federal District
- Annual budget: $4.2 b BRL (2023)
- Agency executives: Jorge Messias, Attorney General; Clarice Calixto, Secretary-General of Consulting; Isadora Cartaxo de Arruda, Secretary-General of Litigation; André Dantas, Consultant General of the Union; Marcelo Feitosa, Prosecutor General of the Union; Adriana Venturini, Federal Prosecutor General; Anelize Ruas de Almeida, Prosecutor General of National Finances
- Website: www.gov.br/agu/

The Attorney General Office (Portuguese: Advocacia-Geral da União, AGU) is a cabinet-level position in the Brazilian government charged with advising the Executive Branch and representing the federal government of Brazil in legal proceedings legally known as the Union (União). It is the institution responsible for the legal representation, supervision and control of the Union and the Government of Federative Republic of Brazil, as well as for the protection of public assets against third parties or Government members. The Attorney General is defined under the Article 131 of the Brazilian Constitution as one of the essential functions of Brazilian judicial administration, along with the roles performed by the judicial branch, the Prosecutor's office, the public defenders and private lawyers. It practices, along with the Attorney General's Office of the National Treasury, the Federal Attorney General's Office and the Attorney General's Office of the Central Bank, public law at the federal level, which gives it the representation of all the powers of the Union in the judicial or extrajudicial sphere. The current Attorney General is Jorge Messias.

Under the constitution, the Attorney General must be at least 35 years old. All Attorneys General within the Office must be bar members in Brazil. The Attorney General of the Union is a member of the Brazilian cabinet, holds the rank of Minister, and is also the head of the Advocacia-Geral da União (AGU), which is an essential function and branch of the federal government formed by its own Attorneys.

The attorneys who comprise the AGU are divided into four career paths: the Attorney for the National Treasury (Procuradores da Fazenda Nacional), who represent the federal government in tax and financial matters; the Attorney for Brazil (Advogados da União), who represent the government in general cases; the Attorney for the Federal Agencies (Procuradores Federais), who represent the federal agencies; and the Attorney for the Central Bank (Procuradores do Banco Central). Their functions are not limited to the Judiciary, and they are also responsible for internal legal control of the government and international legal representation of the Republic.

== List of attorneys general ==
| No. | Portrait | Attorney General | Took office | Left office | Time in office | President |
|---|---|---|---|---|---|---|
| 1 | José de Castro Ferreira | José de Castro Ferreira (1934–2005) | 12 February 1993 | 3 May 1993 | 80 days | Itamar Franco (MDB) |
| 2 | Alexandre de Paula Dupeyrat Martins | Alexandre de Paula Dupeyrat Martins (born 1944) | 3 May 1993 | 30 June 1993 | 58 days | Itamar Franco (MDB) |
| – | Tarcísio Carlos de Almeida Cunha | Tarcísio Carlos de Almeida Cunha (born 1929); Acting | 30 June 1993 | 5 July 1993 | 5 days | Itamar Franco (MDB) |
| 3 | Geraldo Magela | Geraldo Magela (1935–2024) | 5 July 1993 | 24 January 2000 | 6 years, 203 days | Itamar Franco (MDB); Fernando Henrique Cardoso (PSDB) |
| – | Walter do Carmo Barletta | Walter do Carmo Barletta (born 1940); Acting | 24 January 2000 | 31 January 2000 | 7 days | Fernando Henrique Cardoso (PSDB) |
| 4 | Gilmar Mendes | Gilmar Mendes (born 1955) | 31 January 2000 | 20 June 2002 | 2 years, 140 days | Fernando Henrique Cardoso (PSDB) |
| 5 | José Bonifácio de Andrada | José Bonifácio de Andrada (born 1956) | 20 June 2002 | 1 January 2003 | 195 days | Fernando Henrique Cardoso (PSDB) |
| 6 | Álvaro Augusto Ribeiro Costa | Álvaro Augusto Ribeiro Costa (born 1947) | 1 January 2003 | 11 March 2007 | 4 years, 69 days | Luiz Inácio Lula da Silva (PT) |
| 7 | Dias Toffoli | Dias Toffoli (born 1967) | 11 March 2007 | 23 October 2009 | 2 years, 226 days | Luiz Inácio Lula da Silva (PT) |
| 8 | Luís Inácio Adams | Luís Inácio Adams (born 1965) | 23 October 2009 | 3 March 2016 | 6 years, 132 days | Luiz Inácio Lula da Silva (PT); Dilma Rousseff (PT) |
| 9 | José Eduardo Cardozo | José Eduardo Cardozo (born 1959) | 3 March 2016 | 12 May 2016 | 70 days | Dilma Rousseff (PT) |
| 10 | Fábio Medina Osório | Fábio Medina Osório (born 1967) | 12 May 2016 | 9 September 2016 | 120 days | Michel Temer (MDB) |
| 11 | Grace Mendonça | Grace Mendonça (born 1968) | 9 September 2016 | 1 January 2019 | 2 years, 114 days | Michel Temer (MDB) |
| 12 | André Mendonça | André Mendonça (born 1972) | 1 January 2019 | 28 April 2020 | 1 year, 118 days | Jair Bolsonaro (PSL) |
| 13 | José Levi do Amaral | José Levi do Amaral (born 1976) | 29 April 2020 | 29 March 2021 | 334 days | Jair Bolsonaro (Ind) |
| 14 | André Mendonça | André Mendonça (born 1972) | 29 March 2021 | 6 August 2021 | 130 days | Jair Bolsonaro (Ind) |
| 15 | Bruno Bianco | Bruno Bianco (born 1982) | 6 August 2021 | 1 January 2023 | 1 year, 148 days | Jair Bolsonaro (PL) |
| 16 | Jorge Messias | Jorge Messias (born 1980) | 1 January 2023 | Incumbent | 3 years, 207 days | Luiz Inácio Lula da Silva (PT) |

== Prosecutor General of Brazil ==
The prosecutorial duties of the office of the Attorney General were split off to a new Prosecutor General, named Prosecutor General of the Republic, under the Article 4 of the Federal Law No. 73 of 10 February 1993. The Prosecutor General is appointed by the President and confirmed by the Senate. The office of Prosecutor General of the Republic (PGR) is an autonomous agency in charge of criminal prosecution and the defense of society in general, versus the office of the Attorney General, which represents the federal government in legal proceedings.

The Prosecutor General of the Republic (PGR) is the head of the Federal Prosecution Service (Ministério Público Federal), which is also an essential function but holds the responsibility for criminal prosecution. Differently from the AGU, the members of the Federal Prosecution Service are called "Federal Prosecutor", and are in charge of criminal prosecution at the first level of the Federal Justice. Despite the title, the Federal Prosecutor do not legally represent the Republic in international issues, which is a responsibility of the members of the AGU.

== Federal Public Defender General ==
The Federal Public Defender General oversees the federal public defenders offices.

== See also ==
- Public Procuracy of Brazil
- Prosecutor General of Brazil
- Brazilian Ministry of Justice
- Brazilian Public Prosecutor's Office
- Brazilian Public Defender's Office
- Other attorneys general
