= Jorge Messias =

Attorney General of Brazil since 2023

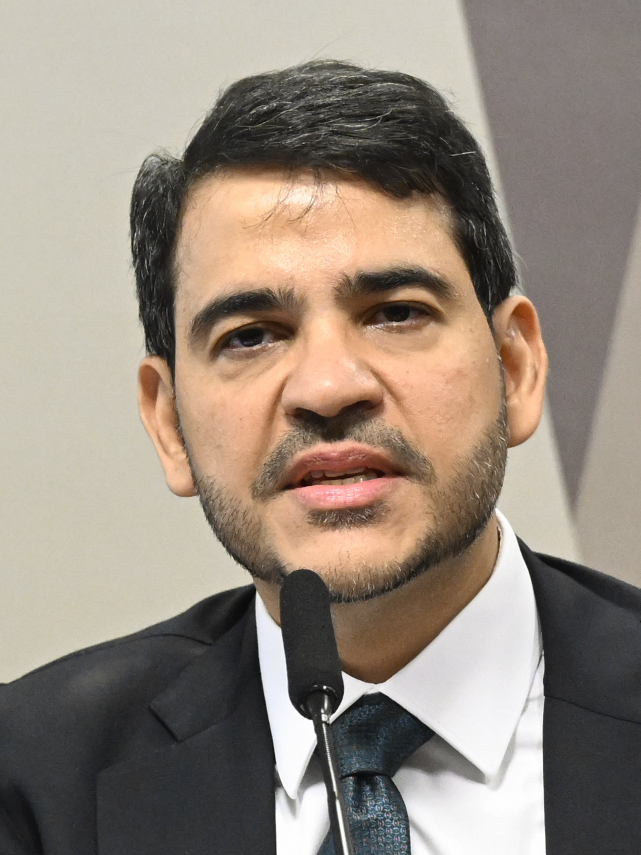
- Jorge Messias in 2024

Attorney General of the Union
- Incumbent
- Assumed office 1 January 2023
- President: Luiz Inácio Lula da Silva
- Preceded by: Bruno Bianco

Personal details
- Born: Jorge Rodrigo Araújo Messias; 25 February 1980 (age 46) Recife, Pernambuco, Brazil
- Education: Federal University of Pernambuco (LL.B.); University of Brasília (M.A., D.Sc.)
- Profession: Attorney

Jorge Rodrigo Araújo Messias (born 25 February 1980) is a Brazilian attorney, incumbent Attorney General of Brazil nominated by president Luiz Inácio Lula da Silva. He joined the Attorney General's Office in 2007 as prosecutor of National Finances and served as deputy chief for legal affairs of the Chief of Staff during the presidency of Dilma Rousseff.

On 20 November 2025, president Lula nominated Messias to the Supreme Federal Court seat vacated by the retirement of Luís Roberto Barroso. His confirmation hearing in the Federal Senate took place on 29 April 2026, and he was rejected by a vote of 34 to 42. It was the first time since 1894 that the Senate rejected a presidential nomination to the Supreme Court.

== Career ==
Messias also worked as prosecutor in the Central Bank of Brazil and the Brazilian Development Bank (BNDES), legal consultant in the Ministry of Science, Technology and Innovation, secretary of regulation and oversight of Higher Education in the Ministry of Education, deputy chief of government political analysis and follow-up in the Chief of Staff and parliamentary assistant to senator Jaques Wagner.

He gained notoriety in 2016, after being mentioned in a phone call recording between then-president Dilma Rousseff and former president Lula, who was being investigated as part of Operation Car Wash and was nominated, but not yet sworn-in, as Chief of Staff. In an audio leaked by judge Sergio Moro, Dilma informed that she would forward, through "Bessias" (Rousseff was sick), the term of office for use "in case of need".

Regarding the mention in the call, Messias stated that, in that occasion, he was an assistant at the Presidency fulfilling his role and that the publishing of a cut and out of context audio aimed to destabilize Rousseff's administration.

Messias is Bachelor of Laws at the Federal University of Pernambuco (UFPE) and Master of Development, Society and International Cooperation at University of Brasília (UnB).

In November 2022, Messias was the most voted by his peers in a sixfold list for the office of Attorney General of the Union, made by the National Union of National Finances Prosecutors (Sinprofaz), the National Association of Members of the Attorney General of the Union (Anajur) and the National Association of the Attorneys of the Union (Anauni).

Political offices
Preceded by Bruno Bianco	Attorney General of the Union; 2023–present	Incumbent
Order of precedence
Preceded by Commanders of the Armed Forces	Brazilian order of precedence 15th in line as Attorney General of the Union	Followed by Foreign envoys
