= Bruno Bianco =

Brazilian attorney

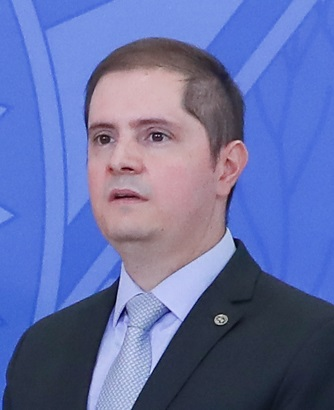

Attorney General of the Union
- In office 6 August 2021 – 31 December 2022
- President: Jair Bolsonaro
- Preceded by: André Mendonça
- Succeeded by: Jorge Messias

Personal details
- Born: Bruno Bianco Leal; 9 January 1982 (age 43); São Paulo, Brazil
- Occupation: Senior relationship manager at BTG Pactual

Bruno Bianco Leal (born 9 January 1982) is a Brazilian attorney and politician who served as the deputy special secretary for Social Security and Labor at the Ministry of Economy, from January 2019 to August 2021, and as the Attorney General of Brazil in the Bolsonaro administration, from August 2021 to December 2022. Following the end of Bolsonaro's government, he was hired as a senior relationship manager at BTG Pactual bank in January 2023. Bianco also served as an advisor to the Civil House during Michel Temer's government, where he provided assistance in the development of the pension reform.

Political offices
Preceded by André Mendonça	Attorney General of the Union; 2021–2022	Succeeded by Jorge Messias
