= Public Procuracy of Brazil =

The State Procurator's Office (in Portuguese, Advocacia Pública) is a public organ connected to the Executive branch that aims to ensure an efficient management of public assets by representing the State as a legal entity in both domestic and international disputes and by giving legal counsel.

It is considered by the Federal Constitution to be one of the positions deemed “essential” for dispensing Justice, along with the Public Prosecutor's Office, Public Defender's Office and attorneys, as stated in Title IV (The Organization of the Powers), Chapter IV (Positions Essential to Justice), Section II .

It is internally divided in units (Procuradorias) for the Union and for States throughout the territory. In addition, it is sorted into specialized sections according to the substantial matters under discussion, as follows: Office of the General Counsel for the Federal Government (Advocacia Geral da União), for the Federal Treasury (Procuradoria Geral da Fazenda Nacional) , for the National Bank (Procuradoria Geral do Banco Central) and for Federal Matters (Procuradoria Geral Federal), all at the Union level, and Offices of the General Counsel for the State Government (Procuradoria Geral do Estado) at State levels. This arrangement was designed with the goal of separating the concerns of the State from the worries of the current members of the government.

The Federal Constitution is silent on Municipal offices, but considering that there is no explicit prohibition, most municipalities have instituted their own State Prosecutor's Office.

== See also ==
- Brazilian criminal justice
- Prosecutor General of Brazil
- Brazilian Ministry of Justice
- Brazilian Public Prosecutor's Office
