= Penal Code of Brazil =

Brazilian criminal code

- Created: December 7, 1940
- Location: Rio de Janeiro, Brazil
- Author: National Congress of Brazil
- Purpose: Federal penal code

The current Penal Code of Brazil (Portuguese: Código Penal brasileiro) was promulgated in 1940, during the Estado Novo regime, and has been in effect since January 1, 1942. It is the third codification of criminal law in the country's history, succeeding those of 1830 and 1890. One notable feature of the document is the inclusion of libel as a crime.

== Background ==
The penal code is one part of the Brazilian criminal justice system. The National Congress passes laws to define what acts are considered criminal; this becomes part of the penal code. The Congress also codifies the procedures for implementing the penal code. Three national police forces and multiple state-level police forces work to prevent and combat crime and hold alleged perpetrators for prosecution. The judiciary, including 92 courts at the federal and state levels interpret the codes and hear prosecutions and judge perpetrators; the correctional system oversees punishment and rehabilitatation of convicted criminals. The whole system hinges on the penal code, which is the starting point.

== History ==
=== Previous penal codes ===
The first penal law in independent Brazil was the imperial Criminal Code of 1830, issued on December 16, 1830 and approved by Emperor Pedro I. The General Assembly of the Empire determined that any offense or voluntary omission to the Code was to be considered a crime. The Criminal Code of 1830 was in force during the Empire.

After the Proclamation of the Republic in 1889, a new penal code was created on October 11, 1890, followed by a new constitution in 1891. This penal code was in effect during the First Republic and most of the Vargas Era.

=== Current penal code ===
In 1934, a new constitution was enacted under President Getúlio Vargas. This was followed by the creation of a new penal code, the one currently in use, on December 7, 1940.

After the end of the Vargas Era in 1945–46, a new constitution was created, but the Penal Code of 1940 was not abolished. There was an unsuccessful attempt to replace it with a new one in 1969, during the military government. An extensive reform of the Code was proposed in 1973 and successively postponed until it was revoked in 1978. Another commission to overhaul the Code was formed in 1980. The reform finally took place in 1984, one year before the end of the military government.

Recent modifications include a redefinition of "sexual crimes" in 2009, and the inclusion of feminicide in 2015.

== See also ==
- Brazilian Anti-Corruption Act
- Brazilian criminal justice
- Law of Brazil
- Crime in Brazil
- Constitution of Brazil
