= Theoretical Inquiries in Law =

- Discipline: Legal theory, Jurisprudence
- Language: English

Publication details
- History: 2000-present
- Publisher: Tel Aviv University (Israel)
- Frequency: Biannually

Standard abbreviations
- ISO 4: Theor. Inq. Law

Indexing
- ISSN: 1565-3404

Links
- Journal homepage; Online access

Theoretical Inquiries in Law (abbreviated as "TIL") is a biannual peer-reviewed Israeli law journal published by Tel Aviv University. It is the only English law journal published by the school, and one out of only two published in English in Israel, alongside Israel Law Review.

== Publication and Topics ==
TIL is published by Tel Aviv University's Cegla Center for Interdisciplinary Research. The journal focuses on legal theory and related topics, such as sociology, history, philosophy and economics, when those are relevant to legal questions. Each issue focuses on a specific topic. Resepected experts in that topic are invited to contribute articles which are presented in a biannual conference.
