= Public Prosecutor's Office (Brazil) =

Brazilian government organization

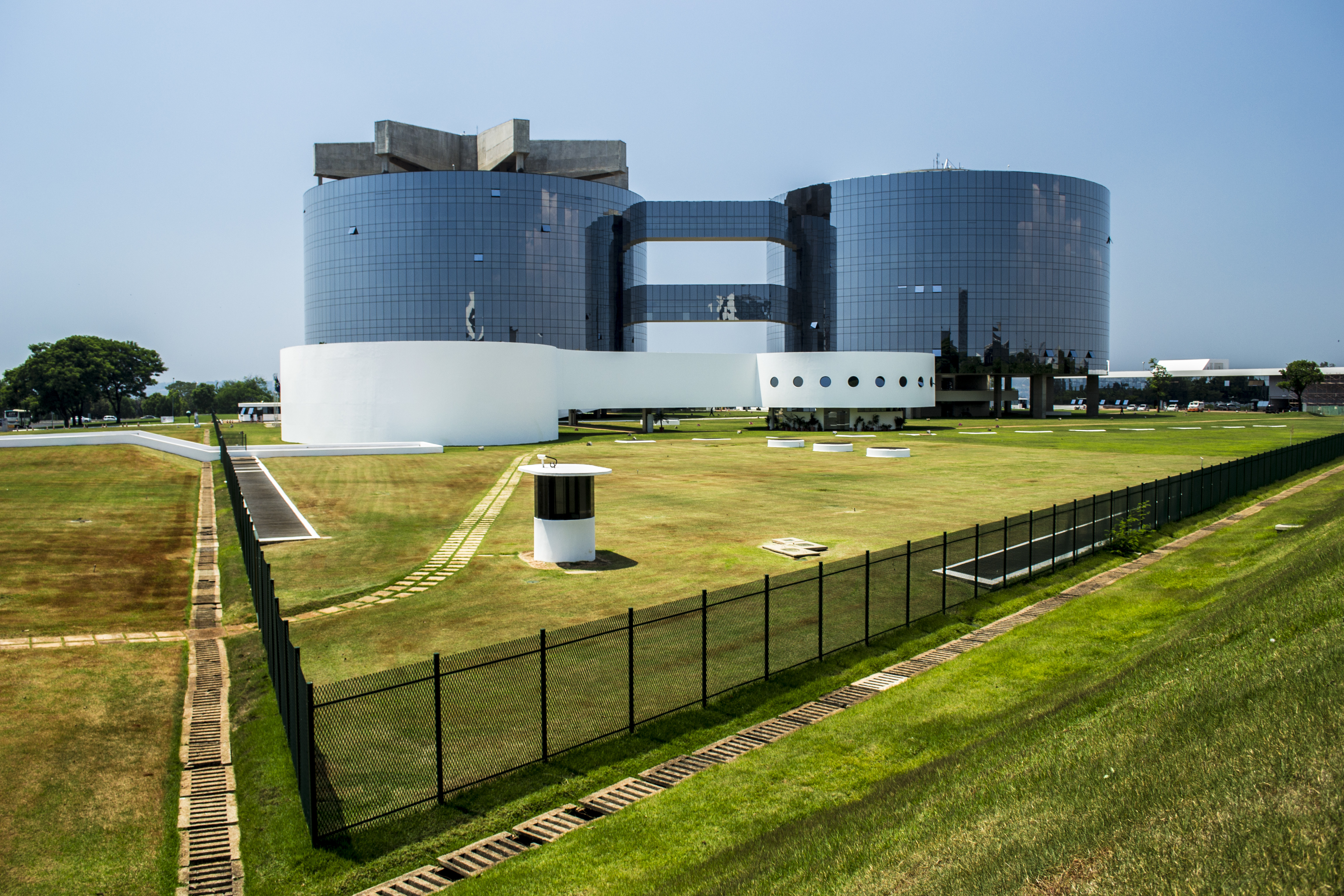
Head office of the Prosecutor General of the Brazilian Republic

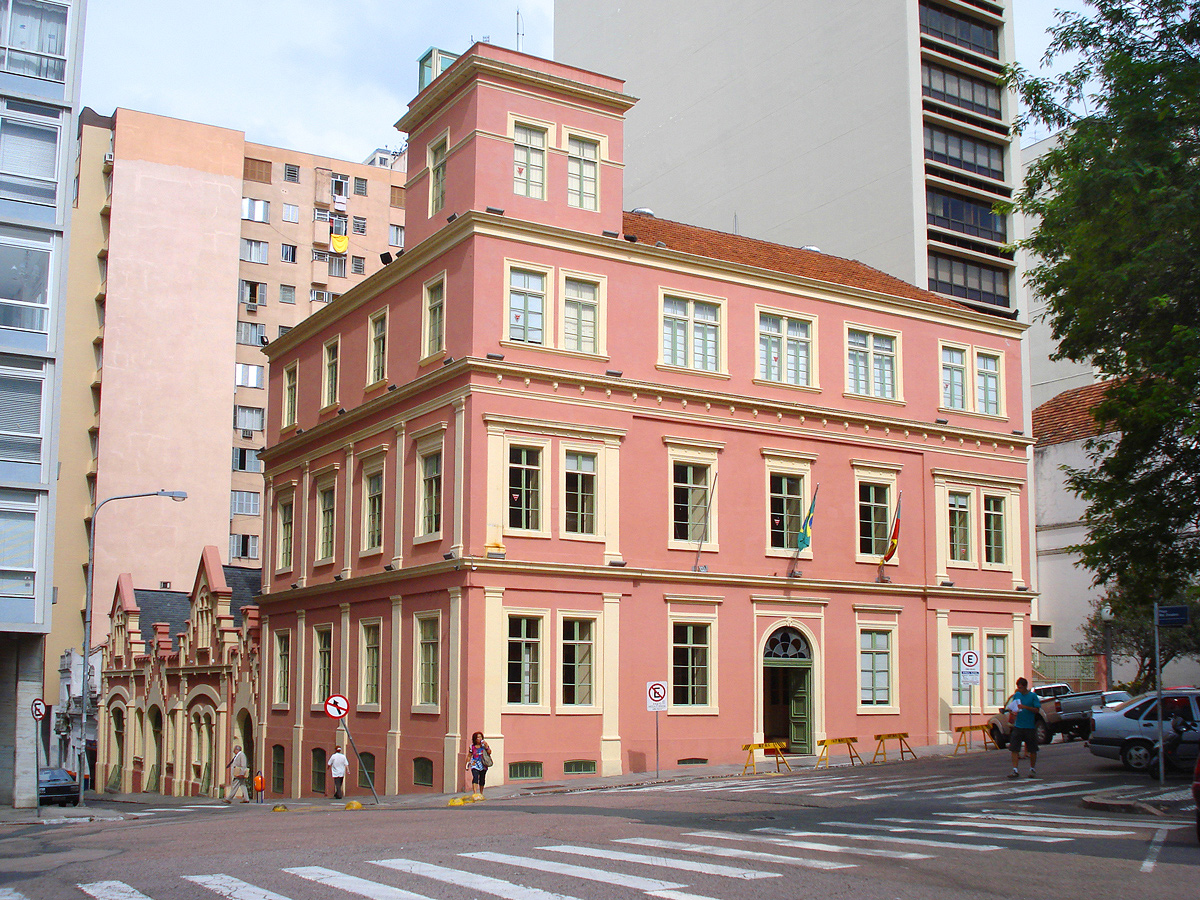
Old building of Public Ministry in Porto Alegre

The Public Prosecutor's Office (Portuguese: Ministério Público, lit. "Public Ministry", often abbreviated "MP") is the Brazilian body of independent public prosecutors at both the federal (Ministério Público da União) and state level (Ministério Público Estadual). It operates independently from the three branches of government. The Constitution of 1988 divides the functions of the Public Prosecutor's Office into three different bodies: the Public Procurator's Office, the Public Defender's Office and the Public Prosecutor's Office itself, each one of them an independent body. In addition to that, the Constitution created the Federal Court of Accounts (Tribunal de Contas da União), which is also autonomous in its functions.

There are three levels of public prosecutors, according to the jurisdiction of the courts before which they perform their duties. There are the federal prosecutors (procuradores da República) who bring cases before judges in lower courts; the appellate federal prosecutors (Procuradores Regionais da República); and the superior federal prosecutors (Subprocuradores Gerais da República). The Prosecutor General (Procurador Geral da República) heads the federal body and brings cases before the Supreme Federal Court, which handles final judicial reviews and criminal offenses committed by federal legislators, members of the cabinet, and the President of Brazil. At the state level, the body usually has three divisions: deputy state prosecutors (Promotores de Justiça Substitutos); state prosecutors before the lower courts (Promotores de Justiça Titulares); and appellate state prosecutors (Procuradores de Justiça). There are also military prosecutors (promotores militares) whose duties are related to State Military Police Corps and Military Firefighter Corps.

The Office is part of the Brazilian criminal justice system, whose task is to uphold justice. The main job of prosecutors is their duty to bring criminal charges and try criminal cases, but also to request acquittal of charges if during a trial they become convinced of a defendant's innocence. Prosecutors have the last word on whether criminal charges are filed, except in those rare cases in which Brazilian law permits civil prosecution. In those cases, the prosecutor acts as custos legis and ensures that justice is indeed delivered.

It is also mandatory that a Prosecutor to be part of litigation related to underage minors.

Although the law allows prosecutors to conduct criminal investigations, they only do so in major cases, usually where there has been wrongdoing involving the police or public officials. They are also in charge of supervising police work and police investigations. The power prosecutors have to conduct criminal investigations is controversial and, although judges, prosecutors and the general population favor it generally, it is being contested before the Supreme Federal Court. In addition to prosecuting crimes, Brazilian prosecutors are also authorized, among others, by the Brazilian constitution to bring action against private individuals, commercial enterprises and the Union, state, Federal District, and the municipal governments, in the defense of minorities, the environment, consumers and the civil society in general.

== Constitution of 1988 ==
Until the Constitution of 1988, Brazil adopted a worldwide-common system: the legal representation of the Union (the federation), the states, the Federal District, and the municipalities, was attributed to the Public Prosecutor's Office, which had a main role as a public ministry of attorneyship and also would act in defense of weaker classes, such as poorer, elder and native people. Hence, the attorneyship was divided between public and private ministry, the first one considered a kind of magistracy. The Union (the federation) was represented by the Federal Public Ministry, and the States were represented by each State Public Ministry.

Under the will to develop the protection to civil rights and improve the democratic control of the Government, however, the Constitution created a new system, advancing from the old theory of tripartition, bringing the Essential Offices to the Justice (articles 127 to 135). These Offices included the Public Prosecutor's Office, the Public Procurator's Office, the Public Defender's Office and the attorneyship itself, which remained private. Although, the new Constitution established a new division of responsibilities, which can be synthesized as the following:

- Society's Procuracy: the Public Prosecutor's Office;
- Nation's Procuracy: the Public Procurator's Office;
- Weaker classes Procuracy: the Public Defender's Office.

Thus, the Public Prosecutor's Office was put in charge of the defense of society in criminal and civil issues; the Public Procurator's Office was put in charge of the intern control of the Public Administration, policing the acts of the Government, such as the legal representation of the nation in intern and international issues; and the Public Defender's Office was put in charge of the defense of the weaker classes. Each Office is independent in its duty to guarantee democracy.

== Branches of the Brazilian Public Ministry ==
Brazilian Judiciary System is divided not only regionally, but also by the subject of discuss. As such, the Brazilian Public Ministry is divided in 5 branches, designed to match the Judiciary Division. The branches are:

- Ministério Público Federal (Federal Public Ministry), in charge of crimes judged by federal courts and federal civil activities. One can say this branch is the "default branch".
- Ministério Público do Trabalho (Labour Public Ministry) in charge of keeping and supervising Labour Laws
- Ministério Público Militar (Military Public Ministry) in charge of prosecuting military from the 3 Brazilian Armed Forces in their criminal misdoing during duties
- Ministério Público do Distrito Federal e dos Territórios (Public Ministry of the Federal District and the Territories) in charge of justice in the Federal District and in the territories of the Union. Since the 1988 Brazilian Constitution, there are no active territories.
- Ministério Público Eleitoral (Electoral Public Ministry) is a mixed branch, composed by both Federal and State Prosecutors.

The several State Public Ministries are not divided in branches, but their prosecutors can be specialized in specific subjects. The exception are the few states with an Appeal Military State Court, as they have Military State Prosecutors in an independent branch.

== See also ==
- Law of Brazil
- Public Ministry (Portugal)
