= Sergio Moro =

Brazilian politician and federal judge (born 1972)

- Official portrait

Governor-elect of Paraná
- Assuming office 6 January 2027
- Lieutenant: Edson Vasconcelos (elect)
- Succeeding: Ratinho Júnior

Senator for Paraná
- Incumbent
- Assumed office 1 February 2023
- Preceded by: Álvaro Dias

Minister of Justice and Public Security
- In office 1 January 2019 – 24 April 2020
- President: Jair Bolsonaro
- Preceded by: Torquato Jardim (Justice); Raul Jungmann (Public Security)
- Succeeded by: André Mendonça

Federal judge under the Federal Regional Court of the 4th Region
- In office 26 June 1996 – 19 November 2018
- Seat (last): 13th Federal Court of Curitiba
- Succeeded by: Luiz Antônio Bonat

Personal details
- Born: Sergio Fernando Moro; 1 August 1972 (age 54) Maringá, Paraná, Brazil
- Party: PL (2026–present)
- Other political affiliations: PODE (2021–2022); UNIÃO (2022–2026)
- Spouse: Rosangela Wolff (m. 1999)
- Children: 2
- Education: State University of Maringá (LLB); Federal University of Paraná (LLM, PhD)
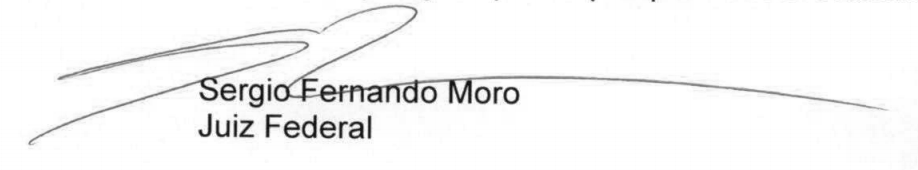
- Signature

Sergio Fernando Moro (Brazilian Portuguese: [ˈsɛʁʒju ˈmoɾu]; born 1 August 1972) is a Brazilian jurist, former federal judge, college professor, and politician. He was elected as a member of the Federal Senate for Paraná in October 2022. In 2015, he gained national attention as one of the lead judges in Operation Car Wash (Portuguese: Operação Lava Jato), a criminal investigation into a high-profile corruption and bribery scandal involving government officials and business executives. Moro was also Minister of Justice and Public Security under the presidency of Jair Bolsonaro from 2019 to 2020.

On 29 October, shortly after the 2018 Brazilian general election, President-elect Bolsonaro nominated Moro to be Minister of Justice and Public Security. On 1 November, Moro accepted the job after personally meeting with Bolsonaro. His appointment to Bolsonaro's cabinet and the way he had previously conducted Operation Car Wash (in particular former president Luiz Inácio Lula da Silva's case) drew praise from his peers and a significant portion of the Brazilian society. However, it also faced significant criticism, especially after allegations of partiality and judicial misconduct on his part were published by American investigative journalist Glenn Greenwald, during the Car Wash investigations. Moro left government service in April 2020, referencing the President's undue interference in the affairs of the Ministry of Justice and Public Security. He then worked with the Alvarez and Marsal law firm for almost one year.

Leaked messages exchanged between then-judge Moro and Brazilian prosecutors resulted in widespread questioning of his impartiality during the Operation Car Wash hearings; Moro has publicly disputed these allegations.

On 9 March 2021, the habeas corpus trial was resumed in the Supreme Federal Court that questioned his impartiality, with two judges, Gilmar Mendes and Ricardo Lewandowski, voting that Moro was indeed biased, including the vote of these two last for the payment of a US$ 40,000 fine and the court costs of the lawsuit filed against Lula. Later, in 2022, the United Nations Human Rights Committee agreed with the STF that Sergio Moro was biased in all cases against Lula.

Sergio Moro was elected governor of Paraná on 4 October 2026, receiving over 3.1 million votes, which accounted for 50.10% of the valid votes in the election. He will assume office on 6 January 2027.

== Early life and education ==
Moro was born in Maringá, son of Odete Starke Moro and Dalton Áureo Moro, a former professor of geography at the State University of Maringá, who died in 2005. His elder sibling, César Fernando Moro, owns a technology company. His family is of Italian, German, Portuguese, Spanish and Polish descent. His Italian forebears were from Veneto: his great grandparents came from Breganze and Sandrigo in the Province of Vicenza. Moro's family moved to Ponta Grossa when Sergio and César were children.

Moro earned his law degree from State University of Maringá in 1995. During his studies, he interned in a law firm for two years, being described as a "sensational person" by the lawyer who hired him. He attended a summer course at Harvard Law School in 1998, including studies on money laundering promoted by the US Department of State. He earned his master's degree in 2000 from the Federal University of Paraná with the dissertation "Development and Judicial Enforcement of Constitutional Norms", guided by Professor Clèmerson Merlin Clève.

In 2002, he completed a PhD in State Law at the same institution with the thesis "Constitutional Jurisdiction as Democracy", guided by Marçal Justen Filho. In 2007, he participated in the International Visitor Leadership Program in which he visited U.S. agencies and institutions responsible for preventing and combating money laundering.

== Career ==
In 1996, Moro started teaching at his alma mater, the Federal University of Paraná. This very same year, he became a federal judge in Porto Alegre, before moving to Joinville, Santa Catarina, in 1999. Between 2003 and 2007, Moro worked on a case involving the public bank Banestado. The investigation resulted in the arrest of nearly 200 people for tax evasion and money laundering.

In 2012, he worked with Rosa Weber, a minister of the Brazilian Supreme Court, in the Mensalão scandal. Weber called him because of his experience with cases involving financial crimes, more specifically money laundering.

After leaving the judiciary and the Bolsonaro government, his first case as a lawyer, in 2020, favored controversial Israeli businessman Beny Steinmetz, in a dispute against mining company Vale S.A. That same year, Moro was hired as a partner by the consultancy Alvarez & Marsal, judicial administrator of the recovery process of the Odebrecht Group – the company targeted by then judge Moro during Lava Jato. Moro worked for Alvarez & Marsal for almost one year and was paid approximately half million dollars.

=== Operation Car Wash ===
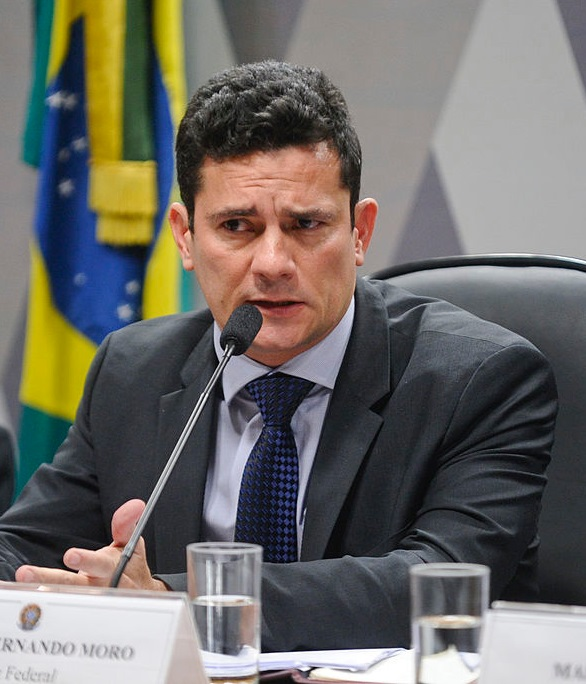
Moro in 2015

In 2014, while working in Curitiba, Sergio Moro became one of the head judges in Operation Car Wash (Portuguese: Operação Lava Jato), a massive criminal investigation that started as a money laundering case and evolved to a huge corruption scandal crackdown, involving bribery and misappropriation of public funds by political authorities. The investigation was modeled after Mani pulite in Italy.

Corruption scandals in Brazil usually take a long time to be investigated and the legal processes tend to stagnate. However, at an unusual speed, Moro authorized further investigations, detentions and interrogations of suspects. By late 2017, at least 120 sentences were issued and 175 people were sent to jail. Despite some criticism from fellow jurists for being a "media darling", Moro enjoyed high popularity with the Brazilian people and became a main face in the fight against corruption in the country. Despite criticism regarding the high speed with which he imposed sentences in such a complex case, his actions were backed by the Brazilian Supreme Court and most of his sentences and decisions were upheld in higher courts. By late 2016, Moro had sent 28 people to jail on charges of corruption, with four of them having their sentences reduced and another four being acquitted by higher courts. Overall, in Operation Car Wash, 71% of the sentences given by Moro were upheld by Brazilian Regional Federal Courts.

However, in 2021, due to Moro's conviction for partiality, famous Lava Jato defendants reaped the fruits of the decisions of the Federal Supreme Court that relaxed the jurisprudence that had taken politicians, businessmen and bribery operators to jail. The number of whistleblower petitions, initial investigations, inquiry requests, etc. dropped from 257 to 200. Of the 31 inquiries, 3 were filed in 2021, 7 complaints await judgment (the same number as in 2020) and no convictions.

In 2017, Moro sentenced former Brazilian president, Luiz Inácio Lula da Silva, to 9 and a half years in jail, on the charges of money laundering and passive corruption. Lula was considered the frontrunner for the 2018 presidential election. The sentencing caused an uproar in Brazil at that time, with many widely supporting and saluting the judge for his decision, with others claiming he was getting ahead of himself. The decision was later overturned by the Supreme Court of Brazil in 2021, which stated that Moro had acted with partiality. The April 2022 decision of Lula's 2016 petition was ratified and expanded by the UN Human Rights Committee. Additionally, in a unanimous decision in April, the Regional Federal Court (TRF) ruled that Lula's lawyers be compensated for the telephone interception and illegal confidentiality breaches by Moro in 2016.

=== Minister of Justice ===
In many of his encounters with the media and further interviews, Sergio Moro described himself as "apolitical" and said he had no interested in joining the political world. However, right after the 2018 elections, rumors started to circulate that the president-elect, Jair Bolsonaro, was considering nominating Moro to head the Ministry of Justice. Despite claiming he was unaware of such a plan, it was later revealed that Moro was contacted by Paulo Guedes, an incoming member of Bolsonaro's administration, during Bolsonaro's election campaign.

Exactly four days after the election, on 1 November 2018, Moro met with Bolsonaro and it was announced that he would become a minister in Bolsonaro's administration.

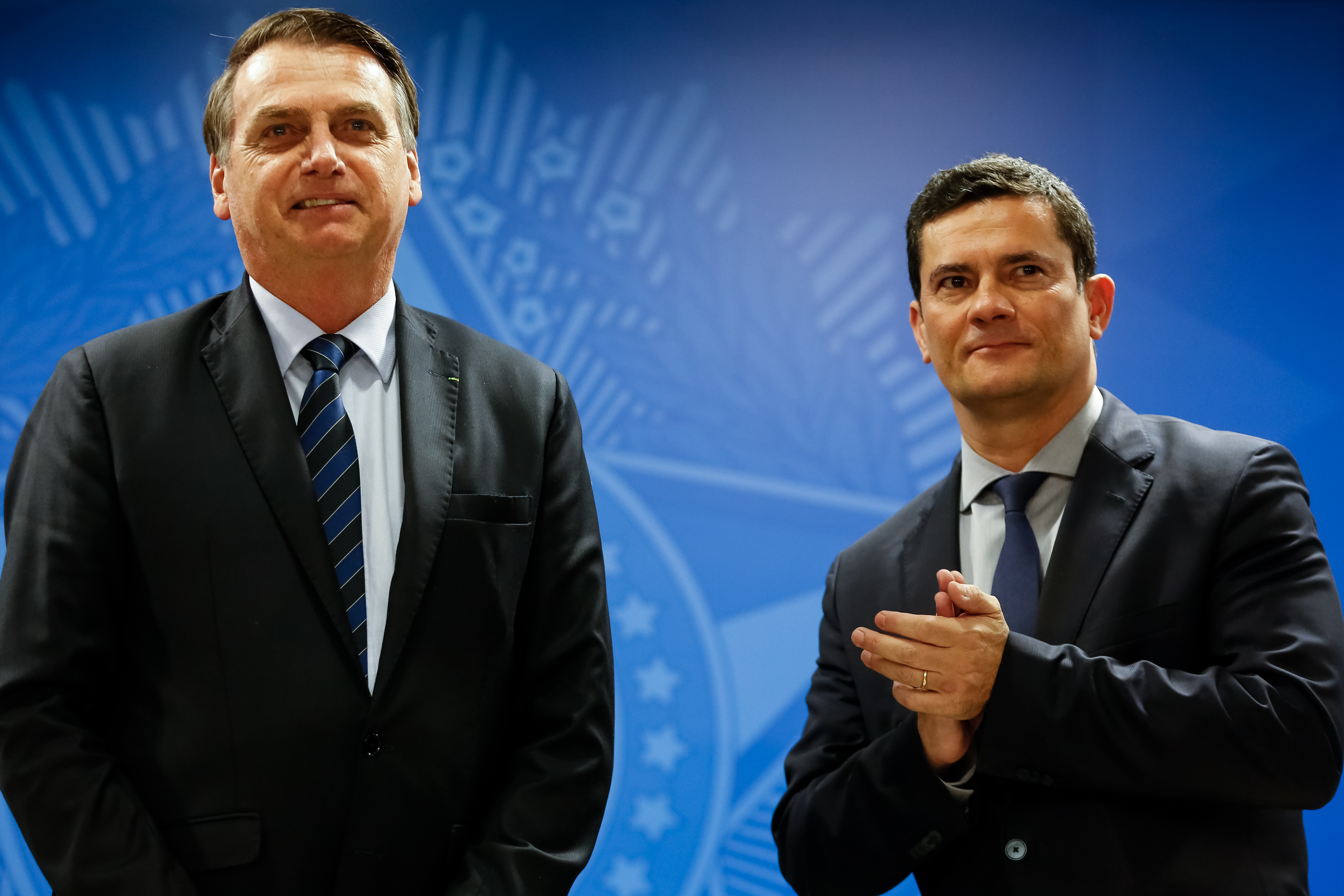
Moro and Bolsonaro, in 2019

His nomination was well-received by fellow magistrates across the country, but opponents of Bolsonaro and some in the press criticized the decision on the grounds of conflict of interest, claiming Moro's sentencing of former president Lula da Silva greatly benefited Bolsonaro's bid for the presidency.

On 12 May 2019, President Bolsonaro publicly expressed his intention of nominating Moro to the Supreme Federal Court, to succeed Justice Celso de Mello, who would retire in 2020. However, on 1 October 2020, he nominated Kassio Nunes Marques.

During his short 15 months tenure as Minister of Justice and Public Security, Moro focused on fighting organized crime, border security and taking new anti-corruption measures, with different degrees of success. Crime fell sharply across the board in most of the country in 2019, but if that was due to any government action or not remains unknown.

By 2020, the relationship between Moro and Bolsonaro began to deteriorate due to a variety of factors. Moro began to complain about the president's interference in his ministry. During talks about assuming the Ministry of Justice, Bolsonaro reportedly made a promise to Moro that he would have independence to run his ministry the way he saw fit, including the appointment of personnel, especially in the Federal Police. However, that changed over time and the president began to interfere in investigations and in the way Moro was running the ministry. On top of that, Moro also criticized Bolsonaro's handling of the COVID-19 pandemic.

On 24 April 2020, after the unjustified discharge of Federal Police's Director-General Maurício Valeixo by President Bolsonaro, Moro announced he would leave the Ministry and denounced the president's intention to meddle in investigations. He then started a career as lawyer and attorney.

=== Political career ===
As a Lava Jato judge, Moro repeatedly stated that "There is no possibility of a political career.” However, he actually started his political career in November 2018, when he accepted the invitation of President Jair Bolsonaro to be the head of the Ministry of Justice and Public Security. He joined the political party Podemos (PODE) on November 10, 2021 and confirmed that he was building his government project, as a pre-candidate for the Brazilian presidency.

Moro had emerged as a "third way" candidate against poll-leading former president Lula on the left and extreme-right Bolsonaro. However, after leaving the Podemos party, Moro removed himself from the run for the presidency. His popularity reportedly faded, due to his controversial decision to join the Bolsonaro cabinet, and of political bias and judicial overreach that tainted the legacy of the "Car Wash" investigation.

Moro joined the Liberal Party in 2026 to run for the governorship of Paraná, and was soon endorsed by Flávio Bolsonaro.

== Controversies ==
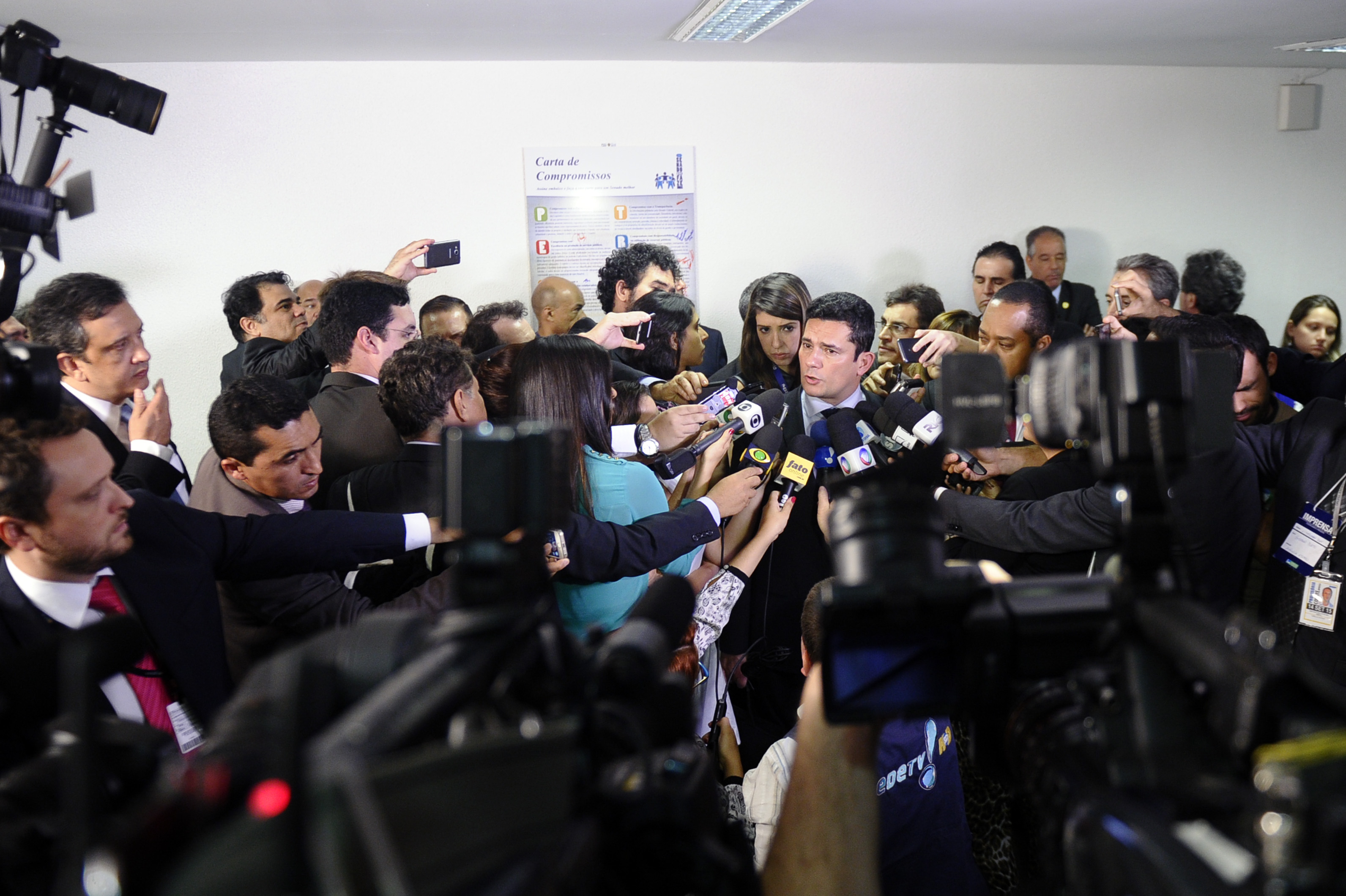
Moro holding a press conference in September 2015

Moro's methods have been questioned by his peers and audited by Brazilian Justices since 2005. In 2007, when a defendant wasn't to be found at home, he issued an order to monitor the lists of passengers of all airliners flying from Ciudad del Este in Paraguay and from Porto Alegre in Brazil to Curitiba in order to track the movements of the defendant's attorneys. From 2007 through 2010, he issued an order to record and collect all phone communications and visitor booth talks between all inmates, their families and attorneys at Catanduvas Federal Penitentiary in order to "prevent future crimes".

These cases, among others, have been considered excesses and caused serious criticism of Moro. Justice Celso de Mello officially accused Moro of condoning a "nosy police state" and acting as an "investigative judge". Additionally, Brazilian Justice Gilmar Mendes stated he was worried about Moro's actions. For him, the case showed a "set of abusive acts" and "objectionable excesses" practiced by the judge. In his dissenting opinion he wrote that they are "unacceptable behaviors in which resistance or nonconformity of the magistrate is envisaged, when contradicted by decision of superior instance".

On 6 December 2016, at a ceremony in which Moro was awarded a Man of the Year prize by Brazilian Editora Três publishing house, Moro was photographed laughing alongside Brazilian Senator Aécio Neves, PSDB's candidate in Brazil's 2014 Presidential Election and main critic of PT's tenures in office. As PT was the party most scrutinized by Operation Car Wash, the photograph has caused an uproar among PT supporters. During an interview, Moro said "the photograph was unfortunate but there's no bias in my decisions as a judge", while also remarking that Neves is not under his jurisdiction. Neves was accused by five witnesses at Operation Carwash of taking R$300,000 in bribes from Alberto Youssef.

The speed with which Moro purportedly treated specific actions involving figures from the Brazilian Left and his courteous relationship with members of the former opposition, some of whom were under investigation themselves, has been criticized by certain Brazilian jurists, and left-wing activists/politicians, who accused Moro of having a lawfare strategy to ostracize PT and help PSDB accession to power.

During a lecture at Harvard University in 2017, Moro stated that he considers the use of undeclared donations – a crime in Brazilian electoral law – to fund elections more damaging than illicit enrichment through corruption: "If I take this bribe and deposit the money in Switzerland, the money stays there, it isn't harming anyone at the moment. If, however, I use the money to fraud and win an election, I find that terrible." In May 2017, then-congressman Onyx Lorenzoni admitted to having used slush funds donated by JBS in his 2014 campaign for Congress. Lorenzoni was appointed Chief of Staff by former president Jair Bolsonaro; upon being questioned by the press about Lorenzoni's public admission on the use of slush funds, Moro stated that Lorenzoni already apologized to him and has his "personal trust".

In November 2018, Senator Roberto Requião (MDB) proposed a bill called "Lorenzoni Law", which would grant immediate pardon for anyone found guilty of electoral and public administration crimes or crimes against the national financial system, as long as they ask for forgiveness. This proposal, although official, is regarded as a joke regarding Moro's comments about Lorenzoni.

=== Telegram leaks ===
On 9 June 2019, the online newspaper The Intercept published leaked Telegram messages between Moro and the Operation Car Wash lead prosecutor Deltan Dallagnol, in which Moro allegedly sent advice and instructions to the prosecutor in order to interfere in the investigation that ultimately led to the trial and imprisonment of former president Lula da Silva. He was accused of not showing impartiality as a judge of da Silva's trial. Three days later, another conversation was leaked, revealing a secret meeting between Dallagnol and Supreme Court Justice Luiz Fux, asking for his support against the then fellow Supreme Court judge Teori Zavascki. Moro has thoroughly denied any wrongdoing during the course of Operation Carwash and claimed that the conversations leaked by The Intercept were misrepresented by the press. He also claimed that the messages could be inauthentic.

On 12 June, Brazilian conservative magazine Veja published a report accusing Moro of “illegally” steering prosecutors as they worked to convict Brazilian politicians and "overstepping his role as judge", claiming that its journalists had spent a fortnight pouring over nearly 650,000 leaked messages between officials involved in the investigation, and concluded the former judge was guilty of serious "irregularities". Following the report, Moro released a statement condemning “the distorted and sensationalist diffusion of supposed messages obtained by criminal means.”

According to the news outlets The Intercept and the AP, the FBI requested case documents about Lula's investigation before the case became public, and Moro allegedly authorized the information to be sent to the Justice Department through unofficial channels.

On 20 August 2019, Rep. Johnson and his colleagues sent a letter to then Attorney General William Barr stating that The Intercept published leaked communications between Judge Moro and senior prosecutors that "reveal close collaboration" and "reports of collusive actions aimed at building a case against former president Lula”. Rep. Johnson requested the DOJ to inform if the "DOJ agents aware of collusive actions involving Judge Moro...".

The Brazilian Congress identified at least 13 FBI agents involved with Moro and Dallagnol to collect secret court files. In exchange for these files and other information, that would help the prosecution of Brazilian companies under the U.S. Foreign Corrupt Practices Act (FCPA),

In July 2020, 77 members of the Brazilian Congress sent a letter to their U.S. counterparts, requesting that the Americans “adopt the appropriate legislative measures” and “hold those responsible agents and officials accountable.”

One year later, in July 2021, Congressman Hank Johnson requested that Attorney General Merrick Garland inform Congress of what roles, if any, DOJ agents played in Operation Car Wash. Congressman Johnson also informed the Attorney General that Rep. Johnson had never received an adequate response to his August 2019 letter to then-AG Barr.

== Personal life ==
Moro is married to Rosangela Moro, a lawyer and current legal solicitor of the National Association of Parents and Friends of Exceptional Children (Associação de Pais e Amigos dos Excepcionais). They live in Curitiba and have school-aged children. In addition to his professional career, little is known about his personal life. IstoÉ magazine described him as someone with "reserved lifestyle and simple habits". He is a Roman Catholic.

Moro was portrayed by Marcelo Serrado in the 2017 Brazilian film Polícia Federal: A Lei É para Todos.

Political offices
Preceded by Torquato Jardim as Minister of Justice	Minister of Justice and Public Security; 2019–2020	Succeeded by André Mendonça
Preceded by Raul Jungmann as Minister of Public Security	Minister of Justice and Public Security; 2019–2020	Succeeded by André Mendonça
Preceded by Ratinho Júnior	Governor of Paraná; Taking office 2027	Elect
