= Rogério Galloro =

Brazilian police officer

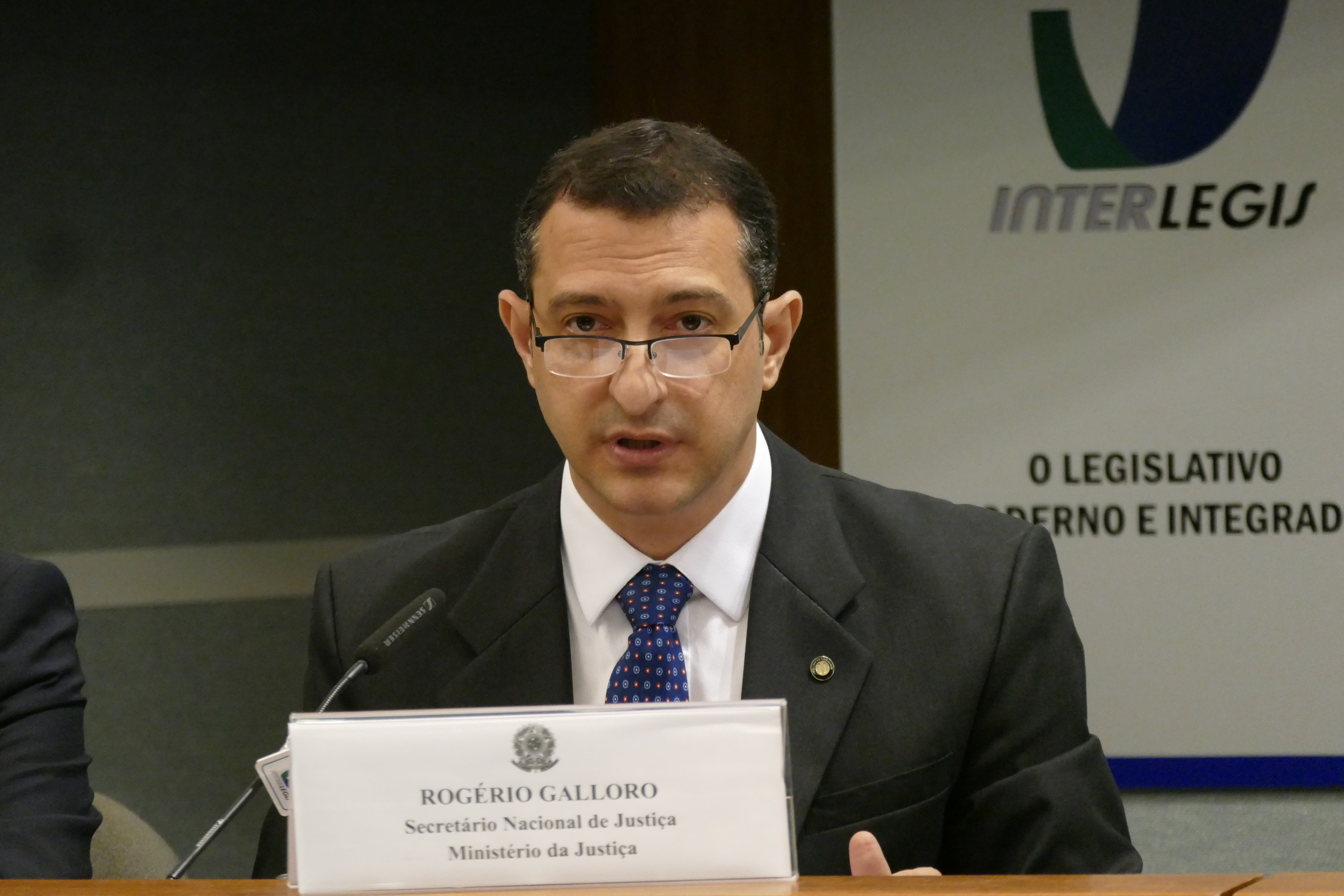

Director-General of the Federal Police of Brazil
- In office 2 March 2018 – 2 January 2019
- President: Michel Temer
- Minister: Raul Jungmann
- Preceded by: Fernando Segóvia
- Succeeded by: Maurício Valeixo

Personal details
- Born: Rogério Augusto Viana Galloro; 1970 (age 54–55); São José do Rio Preto, SP, Brazil
- Parents: Antônio Galloro (father); Raquel Leite Viana (mother)
- Occupation: Police officer, professor

Rogério Augusto Viana Galloro (born 1970 in São José do Rio Preto) is a Brazilian police officer and former Director-General of the Federal Police of Brazil (PF). Joined the PF in 1995. Between April 2011 and June 2013, Galloro was attache of the Federal Police in the United States of America.

== Biography ==
Bachelor of Laws in 1992, Galloro was professor in the National Academy of Police and is MBA by the Getúlio Vargas Foundation (FGV) in Management of Public Security Policies and specialization by the University of Brasília (UnB) in Foreign Relations. He was representative of the Federal Police along with the International Civil Aviation Organization (ICAO) and attended the program of National and International Security in Harvard Kennedy School.

Coordinated the forces of the Federal Police in the security of the 2014 FIFA World Cup and in the 2016 Summer Olympics.

In September 2017, he was elect member of the Interpol International Committee, as representative of the Americas.

After firing the then Director-Geral of the Federal Police, Fernando Segovia, the Minister of Public Security Raul Jungmann nominated Galloro as new head of the Brazilian Federal Police.

Government offices
| Preceded by Fernando Segovia | Director General of the Federal Police of Brazil; 2018–2019 | Succeeded by Maurício Valeixo |
