= Meteoro (disambiguation) =

Meteoro is the word for meteoroid in several languages.

Meteoro may also refer to:

- Meteoro Brasil, a YouTube channel
- ISBI Meteoro, an armored personnel carrier
- Meteoro (brigantine), a ship that served in the Mexican and Chilean navies
- Meteoro-class patrol vessel, a class of Spanish Navy ships
  - Spanish patrol vessel Meteoro, lead ship of the class

== See also ==
- List of ships named Meteor
