= Vasco José Taborda Ribas =

- Born: September 18, 1909; Curitiba, Brazil
- Died: April 3, 1997 (aged 87); Curitiba, Brazil
- Education: Federal University of Paraná
- Occupations: Lawyer, writer, professor, linguist
- Known for: Contributions to law, linguistics, and Brazilian academia

Vasco José Taborda Ribas (September 18, 1909 – April 3, 1997) was a Brazilian lawyer, writer, professor and linguist.

He went to Ginásio Paranaense (currently Colégio Estadual do Paraná) and studied law at the Federal University of Paraná.

He was promoter of Justiça Militar no Brasil, general secretary of Tribunal de Contas do Paraná, director of Serviço Social do Paraná, procurer of the Tribunal de Contas do Paraná, librarian at the Instituto Neopitagórico and a member of institutions such as Círculo de Estudos Bandeirantes, PEN Clube do Brasil, etc.

== Works ==
- Saturnópolis (1940);
- Um Episódio da Ocupação de Curitiba pelas Forças Federalistas em 1894 (1944)
- O Sete Orelhas
- Sapé
- Rocha Pombo (1958)
- Euclides da Cunha (1959)
- Rodrigo Junior (1960)
- Leôncio Correia (1960)
- Antologia do Folclore Brasileiro (1962)
- O Fisquim (1963)
- A Estrela e Eu (1963)
- Varredores da Madrugada
- Antologia de Trovadores do Paraná
- Antologia dos Poetas Paranaenses
- Trufas
- Muçaraí - Movimentos Poéticos (1970)
- Almenara - Meditação (1975)
- Trovadores do Brasil;
- Dicionário Cultural da Língua Portuguesa
- Roteiro - Viagem à Amazonia (1978)
