= Clèmerson Merlin Clève =

Brazilian jurist (born 1958)

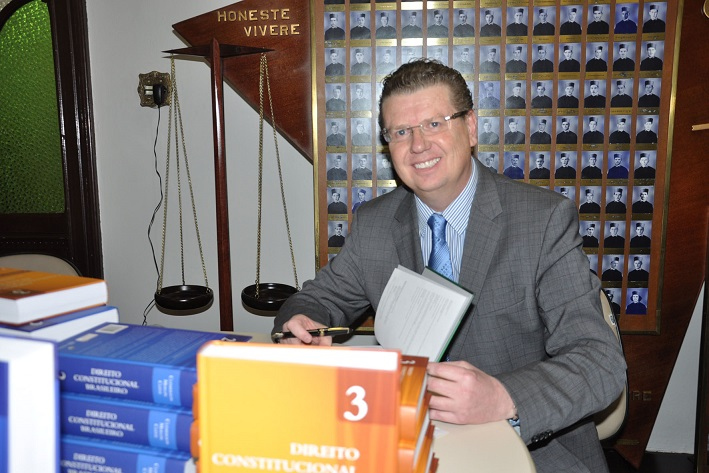
- Clèmerson Merlin Clève
- Born: November 21, 1958 (age 67); Pitanga, Paraná, Brazil
- Education: Federal University of Paraná
- Scientific career
- Fields: Constitutional law
- Workplaces: Federal University of Paraná Autonomous University Center of Brazil (UniBrasil) Universidad Pablo de Olavide
- Website: clemersoncleve.com.br

Clèmerson Merlin Clève (born November 21, 1958) is a Brazilian jurist, Law school professor, and lawyer.

One of the most respected constitutionalists in Brazil, he is a full professor of constitutional law at the Federal University of Paraná (UFPR) (undergraduate, LL.M, and J.S.D.). Clève is also a full professor of constitutional law and president at the Autonomous University Center of Brazil (UniBrasil), and a visiting professor at Universidad Pablo de Olavide – Máster Universitario en Derechos Humanos, Interculturalidad y Desarrollo (LL.M) and Doctorado en Ciencias Jurídicas y Políticas (J.S.D.) (Sevilla, España). Clève also works as the institutional leader of the UFPR's 'Center of Constitutional Investigations' (NINC-UFPR).

Clève completed his university studies at Federal University of Paraná Law School in 1980 and his LLM at the Federal University of Santa Catarina in 1983, and his JSD in public law at the Faculté de Droit of the Université catholique de Louvain in Belgium in 1985, and at the Pontifical Catholic University of São Paulo in 1992. He became the first full professor of constitutional law at the Federal University of Paraná in 1992, with a thesis entitled "Judicial review in Brazilian Law", a classic in the Brazilian juridical literature.

Clève is also a member of the Academy of Juridical Literature of Paraná (Chair n. 40), and a member of the International Association of Constitutional Law. Clève is member of several editorial boards on specialized constitutional law reviews. Acting as an attorney and a legal adviser, his firm is based on the city of Curitiba, Paraná, Brazil.

In February, March, April, and June 2015, and in January 2017 his name showed up several times in the Brazilian press as a likely candidate for a nomination to the Supreme Federal Court.

In 2017, Clève was quoted in the press as the academic supervisor of Sergio Moro and João Pedro Gebran Neto, judges in Operation Car Wash cases, at the Master in Constitutional Law of Federal University of Paraná Graduate Program.

Clève was nominated for the Prêmio Jabuti in Juridical Literature 2015 for his book Fundamental Rights and Constitutional Jurisdiction.

== Professional activities ==
Clève was Professor of Public International Law at UFPR (1986–89); Public Attorney of the State of Paraná (1986–2009); Chair's Legal Adviser of Constituent Process of the State Constitution of Paraná (1989); Republic's Public Prosecutor (1990–92); Coordinator (1992–94), and Vice-Director (1992–96) of the Federal University of Paraná Law School; and Substitute Judge of the Regional Electoral Court of Paraná (1999–2000).

Some main cases which he promoted or participated:

- As Republic's Public Prosecutor, Clève prosecuted, by means of a civil action, the Union, FUNAI, Ibama and Itaipu to protect the native forest, to proportionate alimentary and sanitary care, and to recover the lost lands by the people Avá guaraní during the colonization process on the west of the State of Paraná (1990);
- In 2003, Clève defended the establishment of affirmative actions policies in Brazil. The outcome of this defense and memento was the ground for an article entitled "Ações Afirmativas, justiça e igualdade" ("Affirmative Actions, Justice, and Equality"), published in Portuguese in several juridical scientific journals and reviews in Brazil;
- He worked for the Brazilian Ministry of Justice in the Group of Experts who was responsible for the new Migrations' Statute draft ('Anteprojeto da Nova Lei de Migração' – 2013 to 2014).

== Publications (Partial list, in Portuguese) ==
- Governo Democrático e Jurisdição Constitucional, Belo Horizonte, Fórum, 2016 (Co-author, with Bruno Meneses Lorenzetto). (Democratic Government and Constitutional Jurisdiction)
- Coleção Doutrinas Essenciais - Direito Constitucional, 5 volumes, São Paulo, Revista dos Tribunais, 2015 (Editor). (The Essential Doctrines - New Volumes)
- Doutrina, Processos e Procedimentos: Direito Constitucional, 2 volumes, São Paulo, Revista dos Tribunais, 2015 (Editor). (Doctrine, Process and Procedures: Constitutional Law)
- Direitos Fundamentais e Jurisdição Constitucional, São Paulo, Revista dos Tribunais, 2014 (Co-author, with Alexandre Freire). (Fundamental Rights and Constitutional Jurisdiction)
- Direito Constitucional Brasileiro, 3 volumes, São Paulo, Revista dos Tribunais, 2014 (Editor). (Brazilian Constitutional Law)
- Temas de Direito Constitucional, 2 ed., Belo Horizonte, Fórum, 2014 (Issues on Constitutional Law)
- Jurisdição e Questões Controvertidas de Direito Constitucional, Curitiba, Juruá, 2013 (Editor). (Jurisdiction and Constitutional Law's Controversial Questions)
- Soluções Práticas de Direito: Direito Constitucional, São Paulo, Revista dos Tribunais, 2012. (Practical Solutions of Law: Constitutional Law)
- Fidelidade Partidária e Impeachment (Estudo de caso), 2. ed., Curitiba, Juruá, 2012. (Partisan fidelity and Impeachment)
- Para uma dogmática constitucional emancipatória, Belo Horizonte, Fórum, 2012. (For an emancipatory constitutional dogmatic)
- O Direito e os Direitos: elementos para uma crítica do Direito Contemporâneo, 3. ed., Belo Horizonte, Fórum, 2011. (The Law and the Rights: elements for a Contemporary Law's critic)
- Doutrinas Essenciais – Direito Constitucional, 7 volumes, São Paulo, Revista dos Tribunais, 2011 (Co-author, with Luís Roberto Barroso). (The Essential Doctrines - Constitutional Law)
- Constituição, Democracia e Justiça: aportes para um constitucionalismo igualitário, Belo Horizonte, Fórum, 2011 (Editor). (Constitution, Democracy, and Justice: issues for an egalitarian constitutionalism)
- Atividade Legislativa do Poder Executivo, 3. ed., São Paulo, Revista dos Tribunais, 2011. (Legislative Activity of the Executive Power)
- Teatro inexperto em duas peças quase distópicas, Curitiba, Artes & Textos, 2011. (Inexpert Theater in two almost distopic plays)
- Medidas Provisórias, 3. ed., São Paulo, Revista dos Tribunais, 2010. (Provisory Acts)
- Direitos Humanos e Democracia, Rio de Janeiro, Forense, 2007 (Co-editor, with Ingo Wolfgang Sarlet; Alexandre Coutinho Pagliarini). (Human rights and Democracy)
- A Fiscalização Abstrata de Constitucionalidade no Direito Brasileiro, 2. ed., São Paulo, Revista dos Tribunais, 2000. (The Judicial Review in the Brazilian Law)
- Temas de Direito Constitucional (e de Teoria do Direito), São Paulo, Acadêmica, 1993. (Issues on Constitutional Law and Theory of Law)
