= Henry Bugalho =

Brazilian writer (b. 1980)

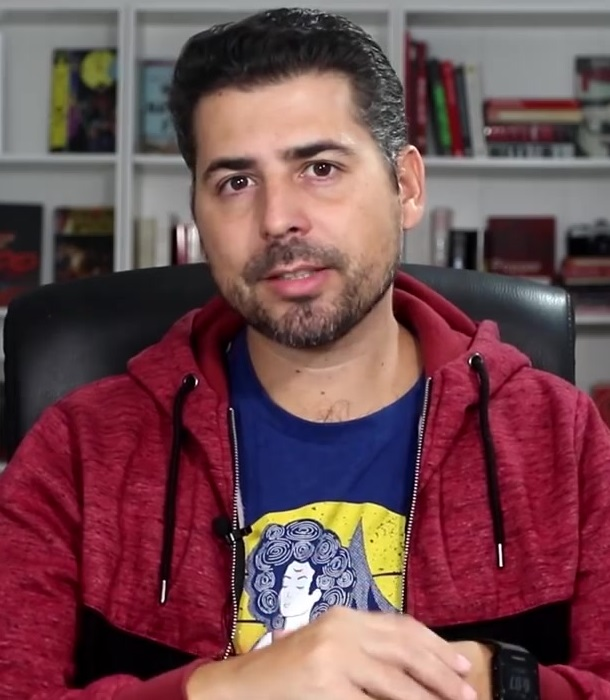
- Born: Henry Alfred Bugalho; October 2, 1980 (age 45); Curitiba, Paraná, Brazil
- Education: Federal University of Paraná
- Occupations: YouTube creator, writer, translator and philosopher
- Years active: 2006–present

Henry Alfred Bugalho (born October 2, 1980), known simply as Henry Bugalho, is a Brazilian YouTube creator, writer, translator and philosopher. Bugalho is also a fellow of the Royal Society of Arts.

== Education ==
Bugalho studied philosophy at the Federal University of Paraná, with emphasis in Aesthetics.

== Career ==
=== As a writer ===
Prior to his YouTube career, Henry Bugalho writes several books such as Guia de Nova York para Mãos-de-Vaca (New York Guide for the Tight-fisted), on which he worked together with his wife, Denise Nappi. This work was featured in the Brazilian newspaper O Globo. He also authored The Parallel Life of Your Dog, O Cão Cego da Guardia Vieja, O Canto do Peregrino, Cassandra, O Rei dos Judeus, O Covil dos Inocentes, O Homem Pós-Histórico, Margot Adormecida, Meu Pai: O Guru do Presidente, and two collections of short stories.

=== YouTube ===
Bugalho created his YouTube channel on 30 November 2006. In 2018, Henry expressed his opposition to the Brazilian president Jair Bolsonaro and right wing essayist Olavo de Carvalho. His YouTube channel, has reached about 593,000 subscribers.

After the 2018 Brazilian presidential election his channel quickly started to grow. He often works with Brazilian Politics mainly criticisms against the Presidency of Jair Bolsonaro.

His channel is identified with a new wave of Brazilian liberal or left-wing channels and YouTubers, such as Sabrina Fernandes, Felipe Neto, Lilia Schwarcz, Meteoro Brasil, Caue Moura, Pirula, Jones Manoel.

== Personal life ==
Henry recently divorced his wife, now having a new girlfriend, and has a child.

Bugalho has resided in over 6 countries and is fluent in 3 languages. He currently resides in Alicante, Spain.

== Bibliography ==
- Minha Especialidade é Matar: Como o Bolsonarismo tomou conta do Brasil (2020)
- Meu Pai, o Guru do Presidente (com Heloísa de Carvalho) (2020)
- A Impureza da Minha Mão Esquerda (2020)
- Um Cego em Buenos Aires (2019)
- The Parallel Life of Your Dog (2017)
- O Personagem e Outras Fábulas Filosóficas (2016)
- Margot Adormecida (2014)
- The Innocent Thugs: A Mafia Story (2013)
- Roma Para Mãos de Vaca (2013)
- O Rei dos Judeus (2013)
- Fantasmas, Vampiros, Demônios e Histórias de Outros Monstros (2013)
- O Homem Pós-Histórico e Contos Sobre o Futuro (2013)
- O Covil dos Inocentes (2012)
- Nova York, Bairro a Bairro (2010)
- FC do B - Ficção Científica do Brasil (2009)
- Tamanho Não é .DOC (2009)
- Tamanho Não é .DOC II (2009)
- Oficina da Escrita e Teoria Literária, Antologia de Contos Temáticos I (2008)
- Aqualung (2008)
- Nova York Para Mãos de Vaca (2008)
- Ponto Final (2006)
- O Voo de uma Alma (2001)
