= Daniel Przybysz =

Brazilian radiation oncologist

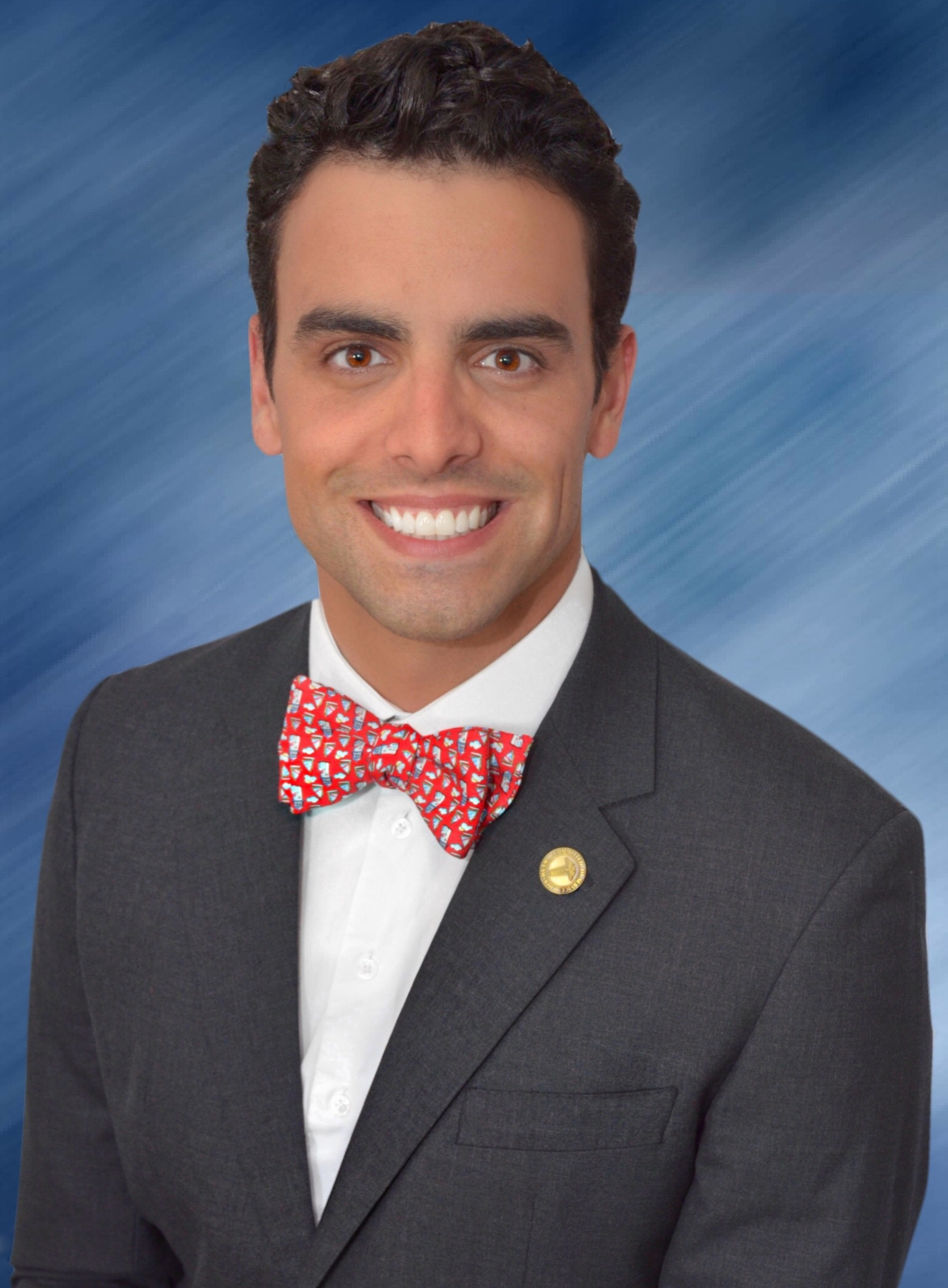
Daniel Przybysz, MD 2017

Dr. Daniel Przybysz (born March 25, 1988) is a Brazilian Radiation-Oncologist. His practice is mainly focused on lung cancer treatment and high technology approaches toward better patient care

Przybysz has a medical degree from the Federal University of Parana, Brazil jointly with Harvard Medical School. He graduated in 2013 with high-honors after doing his internships in Oncology-related rotations.

After spending some time at the Massachusetts General Hospital in Boston and at the University of Texas MD Anderson Cancer Center, Przybysz began a Radiation-Oncology program at the Brazilian National Cancer Institute. He graduated residency and was invited to start a position as Visitor Researcher in Radiation-Oncology at the Washington University School of Medicine.

Przybysz also works as an Oncology Reviewer for UpToDate and as an author, editor and reviewer for lung-related articles at the International Journal of Radiation Oncology, Biology and Physics, contributing on high-level reviews for medical content.

== Publications ==
Przybysz's interest in clinical cancer research and outcomes has culminated in several publications, some of listed below:

- Henke, Lauren E.; Kashani, Rojano; Przybysz, Daniel; Hilliard, Jessica; Curcuru, Austen; Green, Olga L.; Bradley, Jeffrey D.; Robinson, Clifford G. (2017-06-01). "(S009) In Silico Trial of MR-Guided Mid-Treatment Adaptive Planning for Hypofractionated Stereotactic Radiotherapy in Centrally Located Thoracic Tumors". International Journal of Radiation Oncology, Biology, Physics. 98 (2): E3. doi:10.1016/j.ijrobp.2017.02.045. ISSN 0360-3016.
- "Wednesday 31 May / ISRS - INTERNATIONAL STEREOTACTIC RADIOSURGERY SOCIETY". www.isrscongress.org.
- Przybysz, Daniel; Bradley, Jeffrey D. (2017-06-01). "Challenging Situations for Lung SBRT". Journal of Thoracic Oncology. 12 (6): 916–918. doi:10.1016/j.jtho.2017.04.007. ISSN 1556-0864. PMID 28532561.
- Magnetic Resonance Image-Guided Radiation Therapy (MR-IGRT) for the Treatment of Prostate Cancer: Initial Patient Selection and Clinical Experience - Journal of Urology 2017
- Lung SBRT using MRI-guided radiation therapy: possible GTV changes and benefits of adaptive therapy In Silico Trial of MR-Guided Mid-Treatment Adaptive Planning for Hypofractionated Stereotactic Radiotherapy in Centrally Located Thoracic Tumors - IJROBP 2016
- Lung SBRT using MRI-guided radiation therapy: possible GTV changes and benefits of adaptive therapy - SBRT 2016
- Henke, L.; Przybysz, D.; Kashani, R.; Green, O.; Robinson, C.; Bradley, J. (April 2016). "EP-1225: MRI-defined GTV change during SBRT for unresectable or oligometastatic disease of the central thorax". Radiotherapy and Oncology. 119: S580 – S581. doi:10.1016/S0167-8140(16)32475-6.
- A comparison between VMAT, IMRT and GAP techniques on the Medulloblastoma approach: different technologies aiming better patient care - Radiology 2015
- Potential benefits of Neoadjuvant Radiation Therapy On Overall Survival in Advanced Breast Cancer Patients - Radiology 2016
- Przybysz, D.; Hill, E. K.; Dizon, D. S. (2015-11-01). "Sexual Dysfunction After Cancer: Findings From the Program in Women's Oncology Center for Sexuality, Intimacy, and Fertility". International Journal of Radiation Oncology, Biology, Physics. 93 (3): E487. doi:10.1016/j.ijrobp.2015.07.1790. ISSN 0360-3016.
- Vieiralves, Yasmine; Przybysz, Daniel; et al. (31 May 2017). Visual outcomes predictors after stereotactic radiosurgery for choroidal melanomas. ISRS2017: International Stereotactic Radiosurgery Society.

Nevertheless, Przybysz is now developing projects using high-technology treatment planning towards better patient care. At present, he is engaged in several studies regarding lung cancer, CNS malignancies and prostate cancer.

He has been recognized and awarded as a Leading Physician of The World by the International Association of Healthcare Providers in 2017.
