= Meteoro Brasil =

Brazilian YouTube channel

YouTube information
- Years active: 2017–present
- Genre: Education
- Subscribers: 1.75 million
- Views: 750 million
- Last updated: February 15, 2025

Meteoro Brasil is a Brazilian YouTube channel created by the journalists Álvaro Borba and Ana Lesnowski. Borba and Lesnowski began their YouTube channel, Meteoro Brasil, as an entertainment channel in 2017.

== Content ==
Meteoro Brasil's videos include pop culture, science and philosophy. This YouTube channel also discusses societal attitudes to misinformation.

== History ==
On April 9, 2017, Meteoro Brasil was created on YouTube to provide viewers with culture and entertainment about science, philosophy and pop culture.

After the 2018 Brazilian presidential election this channel was identified with a new wave of Brazilian liberal or left-wing channels and YouTubers, such as Sabrina Fernandes, Felipe Neto, Lilia Schwarcz, Henry Bugalho, Caue Moura, Pirula, Jones Manoel.

In 2019 the channel published a book named Tudo O Que Você Precisou Desaprender Para Virar Um Idiota (Everything You Needed To Unlearn To Become An Idiot). The work is satirizing misinformation in the book by Olavo de Carvalho and other Brazilian conspiracy theorists, right-wing thinkers or influencers.

By November 30, 2020, Meteoro Brasil had gained more than 890,000 subscribers.
