= Autonomous University Center of Brazil =

University in Parana, Brazil

- Centro Universitário Autônomo do Brasil
- Other names: UniBrasil
- Former names: Integrated Faculties of Brazil, Faculty of Applied Social Sciences of Brazil
- Type: Private
- Established: 22 April 2000
- President: Clèmerson Merlin Clève
- Rector: Jairo Marçal
- Students: 6.000 (2014)
- Location: Curitiba, Paraná, Brazil
- Campus: Curitiba
- Website: www.unibrasil.com.br

The Autonomous University Center of Brazil - UniBrasil is a Brazilian higher education institution, which has campus in the city of Curitiba, Paraná. It has undergraduate courses on fields of health, biology, math, engineering, human sciences, and law. UniBrasil has also educational programs in specialization courses and a Master in Law Program.

UniBrasil was founded on 22 April 2000 and is maintained by the professors Dr. Clèmerson Merlin Clève and Dr. Wilson Ramos Filho. The institution begun its activities just with the School of Law, called, in that time, as Faculty of Applied Social Sciences of Brazil. In 2003, UniBrasil became Integrated Faculties of Brazil and, in 2014, the institution became Autonomous University Center of Brazil.
