= Enedina Alves Marques =

Brazilian engineer

- Born: January 13, 1913; Curitiba, Paraná, Brazil
- Died: August 1981 (aged 68); Curitiba, Paraná, Brazil
- Occupation: Civil engineer

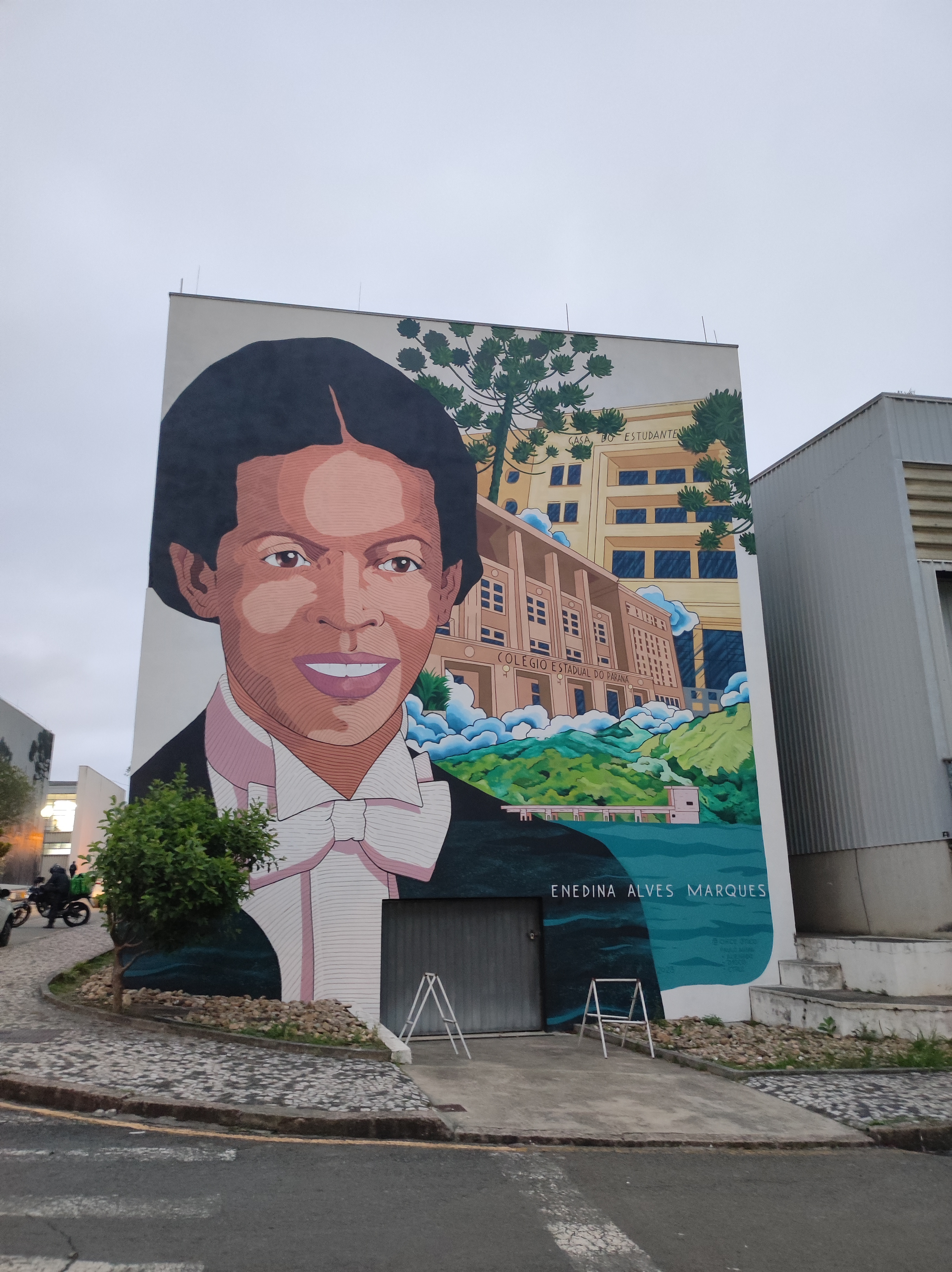
Mural of Enedina Alves Marques by Paolo Auma at Universidade Federal do Paraná

Enedina Alves Marques (13 January 1913 – between 20 and 27 August 1981) was a Brazilian engineer and teacher who worked for the Paraná State's Department of Water and Energy. Upon graduating from the Federal University of Paraná in 1945 with a degree in civil engineering, she became the first black woman to receive an engineering degree in Brazil and the first woman to receive an engineering degree in Paraná State.

== Early life and education ==
Enedina Marques was born in 1913 in Curitiba, the capital of Paraná, and was the only girl among the ten children of Paulo Marques and Virgília Alves Marques, who came to Curitiba in the 1910s as part of the larger Afro-Brazilian migration from the countryside to Brazil's cities following the abolition of slavery in 1888. The family settled in the Ahú or Portão neighbourhoods, where Virgília worked as a washerwoman and housemaid.

By the 1920s, the Marqueses had become close with the family of Domingos Nascimento Sobrinho, a mixed-race police officer and major whose household employed Virgília and boarded her children after she separated from her husband. Sobrinho had a daughter, Isabel, of the same age as Enedina, and paid for Enedina's enrollment in private schools so she could keep his daughter company. Between 1925 and 1926 Marques was taught to read, and around 1927 she entered a Normal School to train to become a teacher, graduating in 1931. From 1932 to 1935, together with Isabel, Marques worked as a teacher in several cities of Paraná, including Rio Negro, São Mateus do Sul, Cerro Azul, and Campo Largo.

Between 1935 and 1937, Marques came back to Curitiba to complete Madureza, a preparatory course at the time required for teachers, at the Ginásio Novo Ateneu. She taught at the Escola de Linha de Tiro in the Juvevê neighborhood during this time, and offered literacy classes out of a rented building in front of the Colégio Nossa Senhora Menina. She lived in the home of Mathias Caron, a builder, and his wife Iracema in exchange for providing domestic services. In 1938 or 1939, she took a complementary course in pre-engineering at the Ginásio Paranaense, today the Paraná State College, (Portuguese: Colégio Estadual do Paraná) at night while living at the Carons' house. Marques lived with the Carons until 1954, and the family has become a significant source for the biographical scholarship that exists about her early life.

In 1939, Marques wrote to the director of the Faculty of Engineering of the Federal University of Paraná (Portuguese: Universidade Federal do Paraná, UFPR) to request registration for the qualification exams required to enroll in a civil engineering degree. She enrolled at the UFPR's School of Engineering in 1940. The only woman in her class alongside 32 men, she graduated from the program in 1945, becoming the first female engineer of Paraná and the first Black woman engineer in Brazil at the age of 32.

== Engineering career ==
In 1946, Marques moved from teaching and housekeeping, which she had done throughout her education to support herself, to working as an engineering assistant to the State Secretary of Transport and Public Works. The following year she was transferred by Paraná's Governor Moisés Lupion to the State Department of Water and Electric Power to work as an inspector of public works. She was employed in the state's hydroelectric power system and participated in several important projects involving the Capivari, Cachoeira and Iguaçu rivers, including the construction of the Capivari-Cachoeira Plant (now the Governador Pedro Viriato Parigot de Souza Plant), the largest underground hydroelectric plant in the south of Brazil. She also contributed to the construction of campus buildings for the Paraná State College.

In 1961, the sociologist Octávio Ianni interviewed Marques for the UNESCO-funded publication Metamorphoses of the Slave (Portuguese: As metamorfoses do escravo) that aimed to profile the successes and travails of Afro-Brazilians. In 1962, upon her retirement, Governor Ney Braga acknowledged her contributions to Paraná with a decree that guaranteed her a pension equivalent to that of a judge.

== Death and legacy ==
In 1981, Marques died of a heart attack at her longtime home in the Lido Building in downtown Curitiba, at the age of 68. She never married and had no immediate family, and it took at least a week to find her body. Diário Popular, a local tabloid, depicted her as an eccentric older woman and a complete unknown, provoking anger among the faculty and students of Paraná's School of Engineering, who rallied around her historic legacy. After the case, the press published various articles highlighting her achievements.

In 1988, a street was named after her in the Cajuru neighbourhood of Curitiba: Rua Engenheira Enedina Alves Marques. In 2000, her name was inscribed along with those of 53 other groundbreaking Brazilian women on the Memorial to Pioneering Women (Memorial à Mulher Pioneira), built in Curitiba by the Soroptimists, an international human rights organization focused on the advancement and recognition of women.

In 2006, the Instituto de Mulheres Negras Enedina Alves Marques, in Maringá, was founded and named in her honor.
