= Pitanga, Paraná =

Coordinates: 24°45′25″S 51°45′39″W

- Municipality
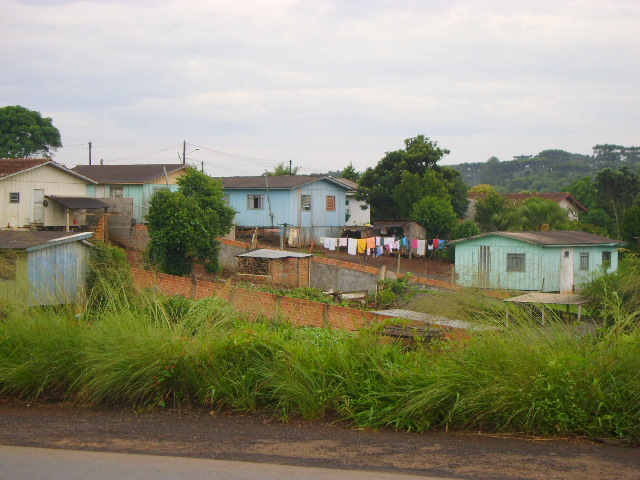

- Flag Coat of arms
- Interactive map of Pitanga, Paraná
- Country: Brazil
- Region: Southern
- State: Paraná
- Mesoregion: Centro-Sul Paranaense

Population (2020)
  - Total: 29,994
- Time zone: UTC−3 (BRT)

Pitanga, Paraná is a municipality in the state of Paraná in the Southern Region of Brazil.

== See also ==
- List of municipalities in Paraná
