= Ministry of Public Security (Brazil) =

- Ministério da Segurança Pública

Ministry overview
- Formed: 26 February 2018
- Dissolved: 1 January 2019
- Jurisdiction: Federal government of Brazil
- Status: Merged into Ministry of Justice and Public Security
- Headquarters: Esplanada dos Ministérios; Brasília, Federal District

The Ministry of Public Security (Portuguese: Ministério da Segurança Pública) was a ministry of Brazil, responsible for managing federal police offices and penitentiary departments. It was headed by the Minister of Public Security.

It is a branch from the Ministry of Justice, then called Ministry of Justice and Public Security. After an increase in violence ratings in Rio de Janeiro and a military intervention evoked by the Brazilian federal government, President Michel Temer signed a Provisional Measure, creating the ministry temporarily. President Temer nominated Raul Jungmann as Extraordinary Minister, moving him from the Ministry of Defence. In January 2019, President Jair Bolsonaro merged the Ministry of Public Security and the Ministry of Justice, and appointed former Federal Judge Sergio Moro as the Minister of Justice and Public Security.
