= Raul Jungmann =

Brazilian politician (1952–2026)

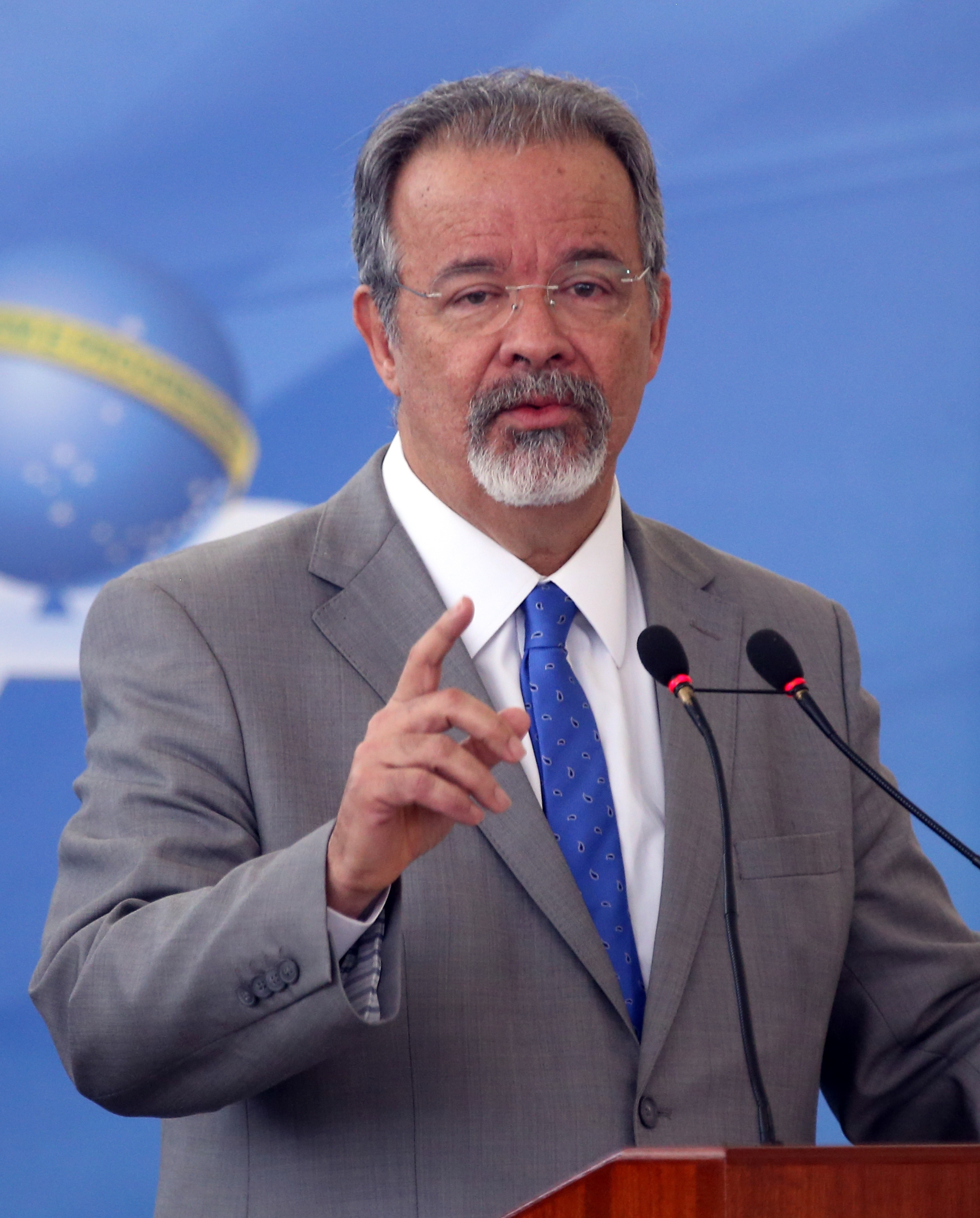

Minister of Public Security
- In office 27 February 2018 – 1 January 2019
- President: Michel Temer
- Preceded by: Office established
- Succeeded by: Sergio Moro (Justice and Public Security)

Minister of Defence
- In office 12 May 2016 – 27 February 2018
- President: Michel Temer
- Preceded by: Aldo Rebelo
- Succeeded by: Joaquim Silva e Luna

Federal Deputy
- In office 1 February 2015 – 12 May 2016
- Constituency: Pernambuco
- In office 1 February 2003 – 1 February 2011
- Constituency: Pernambuco

Councillor
- In office 1 January 2013 – 1 February 2015
- Constituency: Recife

Minister of Agrarian Development Land Policy (1996–1999)
- In office 30 April 1996 – 4 April 2002
- President: Fernando Henrique Cardoso
- Preceded by: Office established
- Succeeded by: José Abrão

Personal details
- Born: Raul Belens Jungmann Pinto; 3 April 1952 Recife, Pernambuco, Brazil
- Died: 18 January 2026 (aged 73) Brasília, Federal District, Brazil
- Party: MDB (1972–1992); PCB (1992); PPS (1992–2018)
- Education: Catholic University of Pernambuco

Raul Belens Jungmann Pinto (3 April 1952 – 18 January 2026) was a Brazilian business consultant and politician. He served as minister of agrarian development under former president Fernando Henrique Cardoso and federal deputy for the state of Pernambuco. He was the Minister of Defence from May 2016 to February 2018, appointed by then-acting president Michel Temer. On 27 February 2018, Jungmann was confirmed as Minister of the Public Security.

Jungmann was appointed CEO of the Brazilian Mining Institute (IBRAM) in March 2022.

Jungmann died on 18 January 2026, at the age of 73, after a battle with pancreatic cancer.

Political offices
Office established	Minister of the Public Security; 2018–2019	Succeeded by Sergio Moro as Minister of Justice and Public Security
Preceded by Aldo Rebelo	Minister of Defence; 2016–2018	Succeeded by Joaquim Silva e Luna
Office established	Minister of Agrarian Development; 1999–2002	Succeeded by José Abrão
Office established	Extraordinary Minister of Land Policy; 1996–1999	Office abolished
