= Marçal Justen Filho =

Brazilian attorney and law professor (born 1955)

Marçal Justen Filho (born 1955) is a Brazilian attorney and Law professor. He was tenured professor at Federal University of Paraná Law School (UFPR) from 1978 to 2006.

Marçal Justen Filho obtained his law degree from Federal University of Paraná (UFPR) Law School (1973–1977), having graduated at the top of his class. He figures in the restricted list of notable alumni of the institution.

He achieved his LLM in 1984 and his PhD in 1985, both from Pontifical Catholic University of São Paulo (PUC-SP). He was approved in a public competition for the seat of tenured professor at UFPR in 1986, a position he stepped down from in 2006 in order to fully dedicate himself to his other legal activities. He was a visiting researcher at Yale Law School (2010/2011) and a visiting fellow at the European University Institute in Florence, Italy (1999). He is internationally renowned as one of the greatest experts in public Law in Brazil, particularly in the fields of regulation, public procurement and administrative contracts. He is a frequent speaker in international conferences and seminars, and has taught hundreds of courses and lectures to government organs and legal institutions around Brazil. He is a member of the following institutions: Academia Paranaense de Letras Jurídicas (Parana Academy of Legal Letters), Red Iberoamericana de Contratación Pública and Public Contracts in Legal Globalization Network. He is the coordinator of the Revista de Direito Administrativo Contemporâneo - ReDAC (Contemporary Administrative Law Review, RT/Thomson Reuters).

He has avidly maintained his legal practice, having also been a State attorney from 1981 to 1984. He is founder and partner of Justen, Pereira, Oliveira & Talamini. His full curriculum is available in the Lattes Platform.

== Published works ==
- Administrative Law (Curso de Direito Administrativo) (RT/Thomson Reuters, 11th ed., 2015)
- Comments on the Public Procurement and Government Contracts Act (Comentários à Lei de Licitações e Contratos Administrativos) (RT/Thomson Reuters, 16th ed., 2014)
- Comments on the Differential Procurement Regime (Comentários ao RDC) (Dialética, 2013)
- Reverse Auction: Comments on the Common and Electronic Reverse Auction Acts (Pregão: comentários à legislação do pregão comum e eletrônico) (Dialética, 6th ed., 2013)
- Infrastructure Law of Brazil (Fórum, 3rd ed., 2012), coordinated by Marçal Justen Filho and Cesar Augusto Guimarães Pereira, who contribute articles of their own.
- The Differential Procurement Regime: Comments on Law 12.462 and Decree 7.581 (Fórum, 1st ed., 2012), coordinated by Marçal Justen Filho and Cesar Augusto Guimarães Pereira, who contribute articles of their own.
- The Precatory Writs Amendment (Emenda dos Precatórios) (Fórum, 1st ed., 2010)
- The Post-Modern State (O Estado Pós-Moderno) (Fórum, 1st ed., 2009), written by Jacques Chevallier and translated to Portuguese by Marçal Justen Filho
- The Micro-Enterprise Act and Public Bidding (O Estatuto da Microempresa e as Licitações Públicas) (Dialética, 2nd ed., 2007)
- The General Theory of Concessions of Public Service (Teoria Geral das Concessões de Serviço Público) (Dialética, 1st ed., 2003)
- The Law of Independent Regulatory Agencies (O Direito das Agências Reguladoras Independentes) (Dialética, 1st ed., 2002)
- Concessions of Public Services (Concessões de Serviços Públicos) (Dialética, 1st ed., 1997)
- The Disregard of Legal Entity in Brazilian Law (Desconsideração da Personalidade Societária no Direito Brasileiro) (RT, 1st ed., 1987)
- Passive Tax Subjection (Sujeição Passiva Tributária) (CEJUP, 1st ed., 1986)
- The Tax on Services in the Constitution (O Imposto Sobre Serviços na Constituição) (RT, 1st ed., 1985)

Marçal Justen Filho has also published a large number of articles on a wide array of elements of Public Law. He has also contributed forewords to other books, as well as several interviews to the press.

== See also ==
- Law of Brazil
- Infrastructure of Brazil
