= ISBI Meteoro =

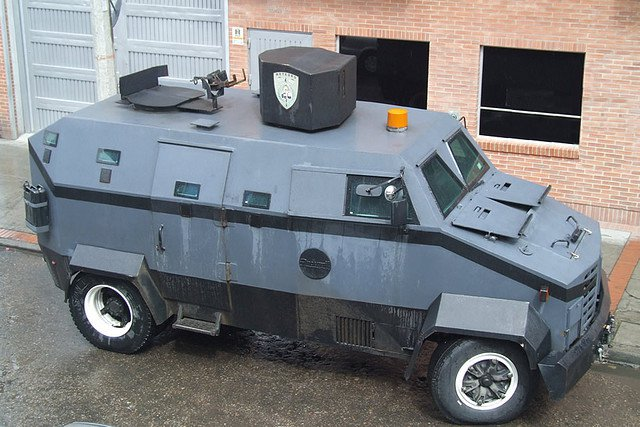
- ISBi Meteoro made in Colombia for the National Army
- Type: Armoured Personnel Carrier
- Place of origin: Colombia

Service history
- In service: 2004-present
- Used by: See Operators

Production history
- Manufacturer: ISBI

Specifications
- Mass: 12,000 kg (26,000 lb)
- Length: 6.1 m (20 ft)
- Width: 2.5 m (8 ft 2 in)
- Height: 2.65 m (8 ft 8 in)
- Crew: 3
- Passengers: 9
- Armor: Norma 10-UL-752
- Main armament: M2 Browning
- Secondary armament: M240 machine gun; IMI Galil
- Engine: 7.2L I6 Caterpillar 3126 Diesel engine
- Transmission: Allison Transmission-Fuller MT653
- Suspension: 4×4 wheeled
- Operational range: 500 km (310 mi)
- Maximum speed: 110 km/h (68 mph)

The ISBI Meteoro is an armored personnel carrier, built on the chassis of a General Motors truck called the Chevrolet Kodiak. It is currently used by the National Police, National Army and Colombian Naval Infantry in road safety plans on national highways, having been in use since 2004.

== Operators ==
- Colombia
