= Pirulla =

Brazilian YouTuber and paleontologist (born 1981)

Pirula
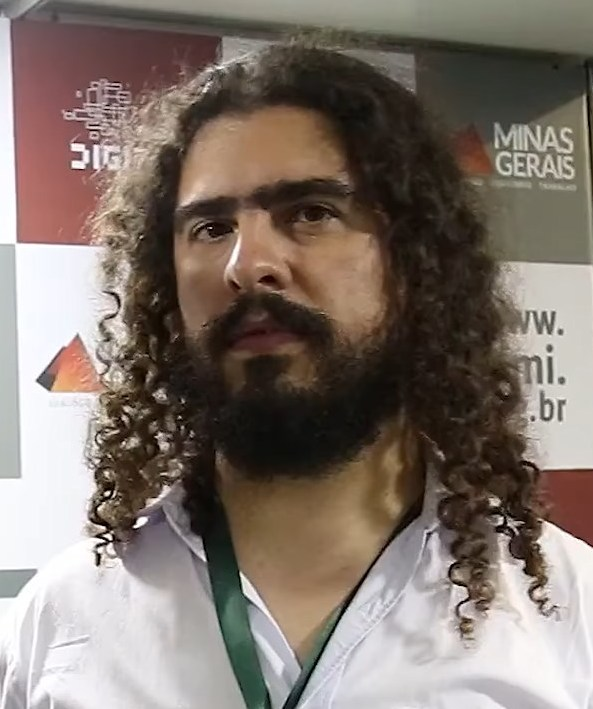
- Pirula in 2017
- Born: Paulo Miranda Nascimento; August 14, 1981 (age 45); São Paulo, Brazil

YouTube information
- Channel: Canal do Pirulla
- Subscribers: 1.12 million
- Views: 141 million
- Last updated: May 14, 2025
- Website: Official website

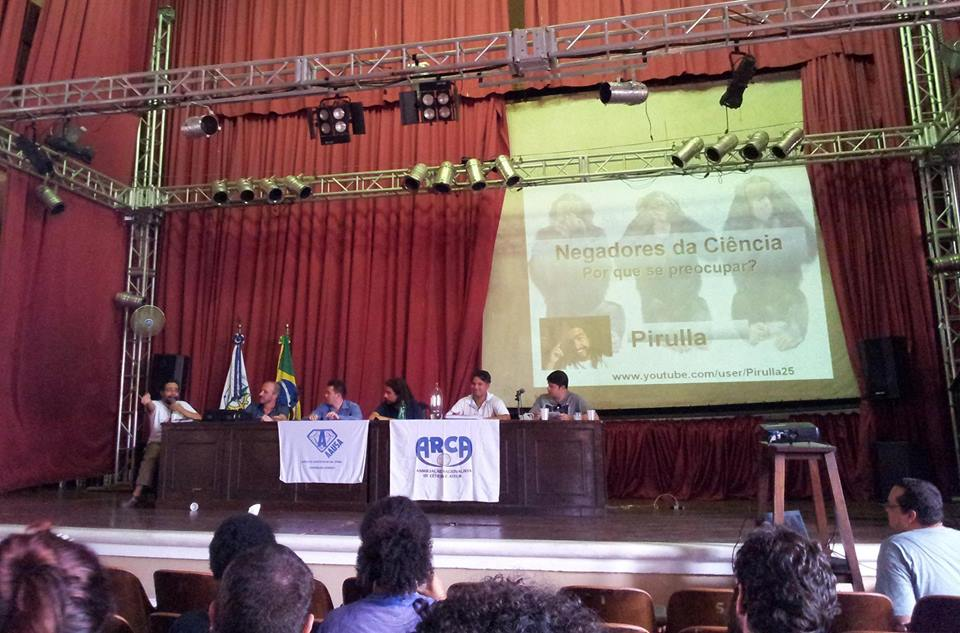
Lecture: "Negadores da Ciência: Por que se preocupar?", on Federal Rural University of Rio de Janeiro.

Paulo Miranda Nascimento (born August 14, 1981), more commonly known by the pseudonym Pirula or Pirulla, is a Brazilian paleontologist, YouTuber, zoologist, lecturer and a scientific disseminator.

Nascimento obtained a bachelor's degree in biology from the Mackenzie Presbyterian University and both a master's degree and PhD in zoology from the University of São Paulo. His PhD thesis was "Revision of the Baurusuchidae family and its phylogenetic affinities within Mesoeucrocodylia". Paulo has also been a professor of evolution and palaeontology in colleges and schools.

In 2006, Nascimento created his YouTube channel, Canal do Pirulla, in which he has discussed science, the environment, religion, philosophy and politics, in long and detailed videos.

Pirula was awarded the Social Media Education Influencer Award in the sixth edition of the Shorty Awards, in 2014. In 2016, together with Laranjeira, Simões, Estevão and other Brazilian social media influencers, Pirula founded another YouTube channel, Bláblálogia, also focused in communicating science to common audiences.

As a critic of how Brazilian media portrays scientific topics, Pirula was one of the founders of the Science Vlogs Brazil project, a conglomerate of YouTube channels focused on science and education which aims to unify Brazilian popular science influencers against fake news and anti-scientific information on the internet.

In July 2019, together with Gilmar Lopes the creator and maintainer of the fact-checking website E-farsas, he debuted a series of videos named "Fake em Nóis" on the MOV.show channel, which belongs to the producer MOV on the UOL portal.

In March 2023, Pirula's YouTube channel has more than 1.04 million subscribers and more than 122 million views.

On May 25, 2025, Nascimento had a stroke at his house in São Paulo for which he was admitted to a non-specified intensive care unit (ICU), according to a statement from his podcast Os Três Elementos. On June 13, 2025, Pirulla was discharged from the ICU but remains hospitalized for continued rehabilitation.

== Works ==
- Darwin sem frescura, co-author: Reinaldo José Lopes. HarperCollins Brasil (2019). ISBN 978-0000185570
