= Federal University of Paraná =

University in Paraná, Brazil

Coordinates: 25°25′44″S 49°16′3″W

- Universidade Federal do Paraná
- Other name: UFPR
- Former name: Universidade do Paraná
- Motto: Scientia et Labor
- Motto in English: Science and Work
- Type: Public (federal)
- Established: 1912
- Budget: R$ 1,038,070,033.68 (2013)
- Rector: Marcos Sunye
- Faculty: 2,328
- Administrative staff: 3,759
- Undergraduates: 28,048
- Postgraduates: 8,658
- Location: Curitiba, Paraná, Brazil
- Campus: Curitiba, Matinhos, Palotina, Pontal do Paraná and Jandaia do Sul
- Website: www.ufpr.br

The Federal University of Paraná (Portuguese: Universidade Federal do Paraná, UFPR) is a public university headquartered in Curitiba, Paraná, Brazil. UFPR is considered to be the oldest university in Brazil.

UFPR ranks as 37th best university in Latin-America and it is among the 651-700 best universities in the world, according to QS World University Rankings. It is placed as the eighth best university in Brazil in the latest "Ranking Universitário Folha (RUF)", published by the nation's largest newspaper, Folha de S.Paulo.

Nowadays, its facilities are spread over the capital Curitiba and other cities in the State of Paraná. It offers 124 undergraduate degree courses, 44 doctorate, 66 masters and 5 professional masters programs, apart from a number of lato sensu programs (mostly paid one-year specializations) - see Higher-ed degrees in Brazil.

== History ==
In 1892, José Francisco da Rocha Pombo, an intellectual of the state of Paraná would have initiated the construction of the university, but his project was frustrated by the Federalist Movement.

Twenty years later, Paraná had a reduced number of intellectuals (nine doctors and four engineers), but it was in true development because of the production of the yerba mate.

Moreover, at this time, the Contestado War appeared as an incentive to the efforts of political leaderships concerning the creation of a university. In this context, Victor Ferreira do Amaral, deputy and director of public instruction of Paraná, started the effective creation of the university.

On December 19, 1912, the university was established and, in 1913, it has initiated its activities as a private institution in an old building situated on Comendador Araújo street. The first courses offered were Juridical and Social Sciences, Engineering, Medicine and Surgery, Commerce, Dentistry, Pharmacy and Obstetrics. After the establishment of the university, Victor Ferreira do Amaral, who was also its first president, initiated the construction of a central building in a land donated by the municipal government.

Due to the economic recession caused by the World War I, difficulties started to appear. In 1920, a federal law determined the closing of all universities. In a contradictory measure, the federal government created the Universidade do Rio de Janeiro, currently Universidade Federal do Rio de Janeiro (Federal University of Rio de Janeiro). The alternative to this law was to split the UFPR in several colleges.

Throughout several years, efforts in order to restore the university took place. Only in the beginning of the fifties the colleges were reunited once again in the University of Paraná, its federalization happening just after that, in 1951, when the university became a public and free-of-charge institution.

After its federalization, a process of expansion began with the construction of the Clinic's Hospital (Portuguese: Hospital de Clínicas da Universidade Federal do Paraná) in 1953, the Reitoria Campus in 1958 and the Polytechnic Center in 1961. The Polytechnic Center campus occupies 617,128 square metres (6,642,710 ft^{2}).

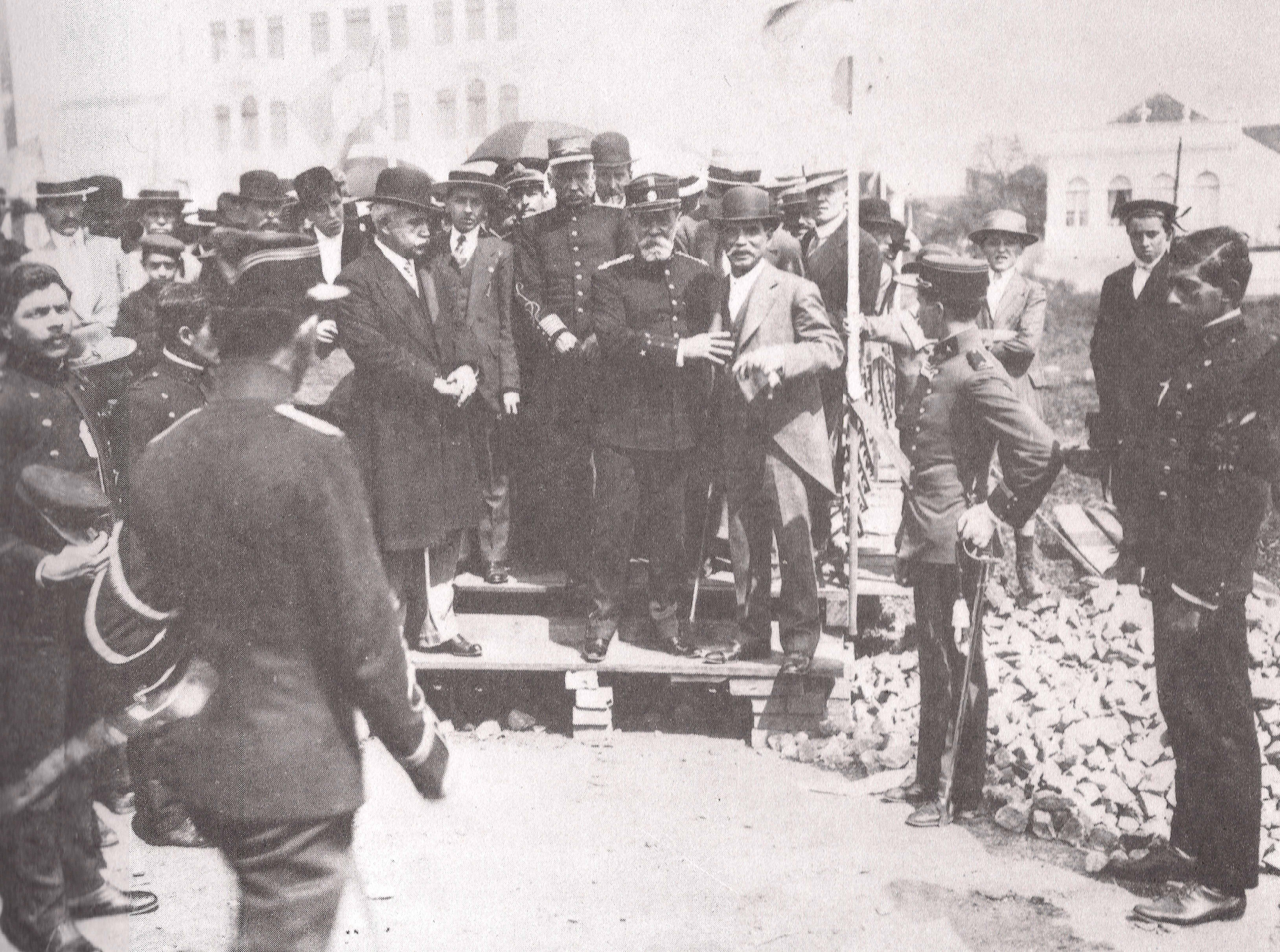
Foundation stone inauguration

== Historical Building ==
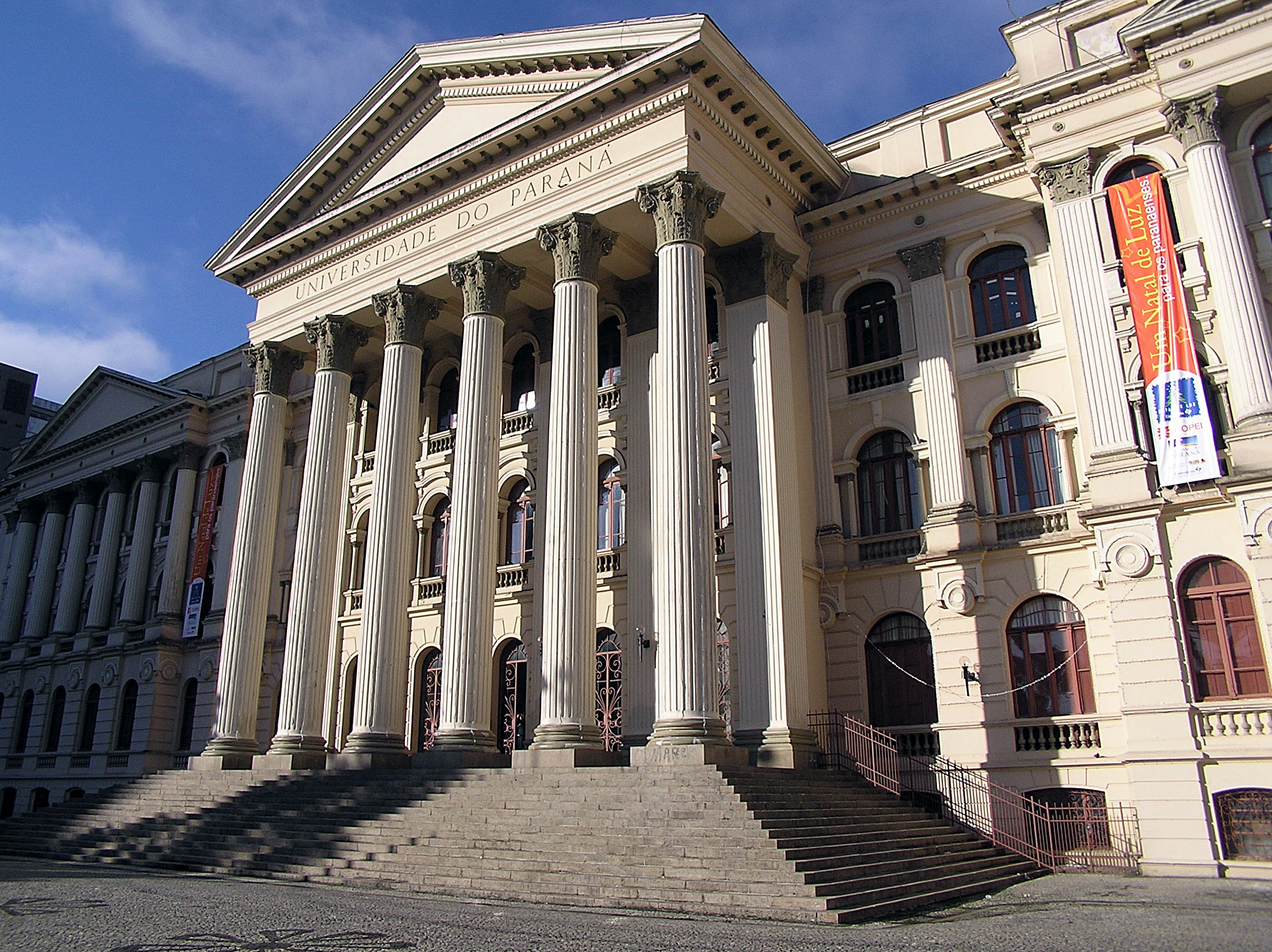
UFPR – Historical Building in Santos Andrade Square, in Curitiba

Construction of the building in Santos Andrade Square began in 1913, based on a project by military engineer Baeta de Faria. It was inaugurated in 1915.

Seven years later, in 1923, two lateral wings were added according to the original project. The construction of the right wing was completed in 1925 and designated for the Engineering degree program. The following year, the left wing was finished and assigned to the Dentistry program. Additional additions were made to the right side of the building, which was fully repainted in 1940. The building was extended toward XV de Novembro Street, and in 1952, new work on the right wing led to the demolition of part of the lateral façade built in 1940.

In 1954, the building occupied an entire block bounded by Santos Andrade Square, XV de Novembro Street, Presidente Faria Street, and Alfredo Bufren Lane. The final modifications included a new façade featuring several columns and a wide set of staircases, and the covered dome was removed. The inauguration of the neoclassical, 17,000-square-meter building took place in 1955.

In 1999, a popular vote was held to determine the official symbol of the city and the Historical Building won. The then mayor of Curitiba Cassio Taniguchi signed a law, officially designating this building the city's symbol.

== Academics ==
=== Undergraduate programs ===
- Accounting
- Agriculture Engineering
- Agronomy
- Aquaculture Engineering
- Architecture and Urbanism
- Artificial Intelligence and Software Engineering
- Biology
- Biomedical Informatics
- Biomedicine
- Bioprocess and Biotechnology Engineering
- Business Administration
- Cartographic and Surveying Engineering
- Chemical Engineering
- Chemistry
- Civil Engineering
- Communication: Journalism, Marketing and Public Relations
- Computer Science
- Dentistry
- Design: Graphic and Industrial
- Economics
- Electrical Engineering (Power Systems, Electronics and Telecommunications)
- Electrical Engineering (with an emphasis on Embedded Electronic Systems)
- Environmental Engineering
- Exact Sciences
- Food Engineering
- Forestry Engineering
- Geography
- Geology
- Graphical expression
- History
- Industrial Mathematics
- Information Management
- Languages and Literature (English, French, German, Greek, Japanese, Latin, Polish, Portuguese, and Spanish)
- Law
- Lumber Industrial Engineering
- Mathematics
- Mechanical Engineering
- Medicine
- Music
- Nursery
- Nutrition
- Occupational Therapy
- Oceanography
- Pedagogy
- Pharmacy
- Philosophy
- Physical Education
- Physics
- Physiotherapy
- Production Engineering
- Psychology
- Social Sciences: Sociology, Anthropology and Political Science
- Statistics
- Technology in Aquaculture
- Technology in Biofuels
- Technology in Biotechnology
- Technology in Information Systems
- Technology in Institutional Communication
- Technology in Luthierie
- Technology in Public Management
- Technology in Quality Management
- Technology in Real Estate Businesses
- Technology in Scenic Production
- Technology in Secretaryship
- Tourism
- Veterinary
- Visual Arts
- Zootechnics

=== Master Programs ===
- Physical Education
- Pharmacology
- Biochemistry
- Genetics
- Zoology
- Botany
- Child and Teenager Health
- Pharmaceutical Sciences
- Surgery
- Internal Medicine and Health Sciences
- Nursery
- Geodesic Sciences
- Geology
- Geography
- Coastal and Oceanic Systems
- Environmental Development
- Applied Mathematics
- Information Systems
- Chemistry
- Physics
- Education
- Anthropology
- Sociology
- History
- Philosophy
- Psychology
- Languages and Literature
- Design
- Music
- Economical Development
- Business Administration
- Accounting and Finance
- Law
- Numerical Methods for Engineering
- Water Resources and Environmental Engineering
- Bioprocess and Biotechnology Engineering
- Food Engineering
- Inter-disciplinary Themes on Engineering
- Electrical Engineering
- Civil Engineering
- Mechanical Engineering
- Chemical Engineering
- Political Sciences
- Bioinformatics
- Teaching of Environmental Science

=== Doctoral programs ===
- Agronomy: Vegetal Production
- Anthropology
- Forestry Engineering
- Computer Science
- Coastal and Oceanic Systems
- Entomology
- Cell Biology
- Pharmacology
- Biochemistry
- Genetics
- Zoology
- Child and Teenager Health
- Surgery
- Internal Medicine and Health Sciences
- Geodesic Sciences
- Geology
- Geography
- Environmental Development
- Mechanical Engineering
- Chemistry
- Physics
- Education
- Sociology
- History
- Languages and Literature
- Economical Development
- Business Administration
- Law
- Numerical Methods for Engineering
- Bioprocess and Biotechnology Engineering
- Food Engineering
- Inter-disciplinary Themes on Engineering
- Water Resources and Environmental Engineering
- Veterinary Medicine
- Microbiology, Parasitology and Pathology
- Philosophy

=== Technical High School ===
Besides the above-mentioned courses, it offers high school education through its Technical High School.

== Admissions ==
Students are admitted by an entrance exam, known as the vestibular, which from 2004 to 2025 used to consist of two parts:

- Phase I was composed of 90 multiple-choice questions with 5 possible choices. The test had sections for each of the following subjects: Portuguese, Literature, Chemistry, Mathematics, Physics, Geography, History and Biology, Philosophy and Sociology plus eight questions of a foreign language which could be chosen from English, Polish, Japanese, French, Spanish, German or Italian.

Over 50,000 people apply every year and sit for exactly the same exam. After two weeks time or so, 15,000 used to be called to take the Phase II, of written exams.

- Phase II was composed of a Portuguese test which covers five (previously seven) compulsory writing essays. Certain courses require that the candidate take an additional one or two exams involving open-questions in Chemistry, Mathematics, Physics, Geography, History, Biology, Philosophy or Sociology, the specific exam choice being determined by correlation between the subject and each major course. Bioprocess Engineering and Biotechnology candidates, for example, used to take Mathematics and Biology tests.

The wait for the results of Part II used to take much longer, approximately between 4 and 7 weeks.

However, as of 2026, the entrance exam system changed to consist on one phase only.

- Single Phase consists of 80 multiple-choice questions with 4 possible choices. The subjects tested before remain the same in the new format. There are now two short compulsory writing essays, however, no specific subject open-questions. To cope with this, most courses opted to have questions related to their subjects hold a higher weight in grading.

A list with all the admitted candidates comes out in the middle of January, and on that day as the Mud-Bath Party, a traditional celebration for the new students, sponsored by the Central Directory of Students (Portuguese: Diretório Central dos Estudantes, DCE) occurs.

== Laboratories ==
- Centro de Documentação e Pesquisa de História dos Domínios Portugueses – CEDOPE
- Centro de Capacitação e Consultoria do Departamento de Ciência e Gestão da Informação do Setor de Ciências Sociais Applicadas – 3CGI
- Centro de Ciência de Segurança Computacional - CCSC
- Centro de Computação Científica e Software Livre – C3SL
- Centro de Estudos do Mar - CEM
- Centro de Microscopia Eletrônica – CME
- Centro de Pesquisa e Processamento de Alimentos – CEPPA
- Ciências Sociais Applicadas – CCCGI
- Centro de Estudos de Engenharia Civil Prof. inaldo Ayres Vieira – CESEC
- Grupo IMAGO de Pesquisa em Visão Computacional, Processamento de Imagens e Computação Gráfica
- Instituto de Tecnologia para o Desenvolvimento – LACTEC
- Laboratório de Análises Clínicas veterinárias
- Laboratório de Acústica e conforto Ambiental
- Laboratório de Eletroquímica de Superfícies e Corrosão – LESC
- Laboratório de Estudos em Monitoramento e Modelagem Ambiental – LEMMA
- Laboratório de Ictiologia Estuarina - Ictiologia UFPR
- Laboratório de Inventário Florestal
- Laboratório de Minerais e Rochas – LAMIR
- Laboratório de Nutrição Animal do Departamento de Zootecnia
- Laboratório de Paisagismo
- Laboratório de Paleontologia
- Laboratório de Parasitologia Clínica Veterinária - LPCV
- Laboratório de Pesquisas Hidrogeológicas – LPH
- Laboratório de Proteção Florestal
- Laboratório de Matriz Extracelular e Biotecnologia de Venenos
- Laboratório de Neurobiologia
- Laboratório de Citogenética Humana
- Laboratório de Genética Molecular Humana – LGMH
- Laboratório de Metabolismo Celular
- Laboratório de Imunogenética e Histocompatibilidade
- Laboratório de Óptica de Raios-X e Instrumentação – LORXI
- Laboratório de Superfícies e Interfaces – LSI
- Laboratório de Genética de Microorganismos – LabGeM
- Laboratório de Bioquimíca e Biofísica de Macromoléculas
- Laboratório de Anestesia e Analgesia Veterinária - LABEST
- Núcleo de Fixação de Nitrogênio - NFIX
- Núcleo de Redes sem Fio e Redes Avançadas - NR2

And many more

== Libraries ==
The university has over 400,000 books and theses as well as thousand of periodicals that, for now, can't be accessed through its intranet, but will be in the future.

Juvevê

- Agricultural science

Centro

- Central (administrative headquarters)
- Human and Educational science
- Health science (main campus)
- Judicial science

Centro Politécnico

- Science and technology
- Biological science
- Technical High School

Jardim Botânico

- Forest and Wood sciences
- Health science (secondary campus)
- Applied Social Sciences
- Physical Education

Matinhos

- UFPR Litoral

Paranaguá

- Archeology and Ethnology Museum of UFPR

Pontal do Paraná

- Sea Studies Center

== Campi ==
In Curitiba

- Campus Juvevê
- Campus Batel
- Campus Centro
- Campus Reitoria
- Campus Ciências Agrárias/Cabral
- Campus III/Centro Politécnico
- Campus III/Escola Técnica
- Campus III/Jardim Botânico

Other cities

- Campus Palotina – Palotina
- Campus Estudos do Mar – Pontal do Paraná
- Campus Litoral – Matinhos
- Campus Jandaia do Sul – Jandaia do Sul

== Publications ==
- Archives of Veterinary Science
- Acta Biologica Paranaense
- Boletim Paranaense de Geociências
- Educar em Revista
- Jornal de Ciências do Exercício e do Esporte
- Jornal do Hospital das Clínicas
- Revista de Ciências Humanas
- Revista de Sociologia e Política
- Revista do Departamento e Programa de Pós-Graduação
- Revista Eletrônica de Musicologia
- Revista Floresta
- Revista Interação
- Revista Letras
- Scientia Agraria
- Revista de Engenharia Térmica

== Notable alumni ==
- Blairo Maggi — agrobusiness entrepreneur
- Clèmerson Merlin Clève — jurist, lawyer, and entrepreneur
- Dalton Trevisan — writer, Camões Prize winner
- Daniel Przybysz — radiation oncologist
- Edson Fachin — jurist, lawyer
- Edith Fanta — Antarctic researcher
- Enedina Alves Marques — civil engineer, first Black woman to receive an engineering degree in Brazil
- Henry Bugalho — philosopher and writer
- Jaime Lerner — governor of Paraná (1995-2002)
- Jorge Reis-Filho — scientist
- Laurentino Gomes — writer and journalist, Jabuti Prize winner
- Marçal Justen Filho — jurist, lawyer
- Newton da Costa — logician and mathematician
- Roberto Requião — governor of Paraná (2003-2010) and senator since 2011
- Tirone E. David — medical doctor
- Wilson Martins — politician (Governor of Piauí from April 1, 2010, to April 2, 2014.)
Notable UFPR Alumni

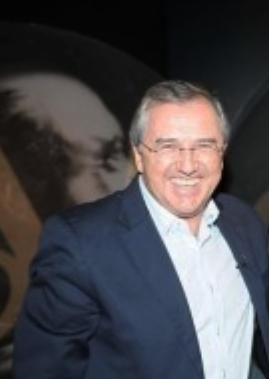
Laurentino Gomes, writer

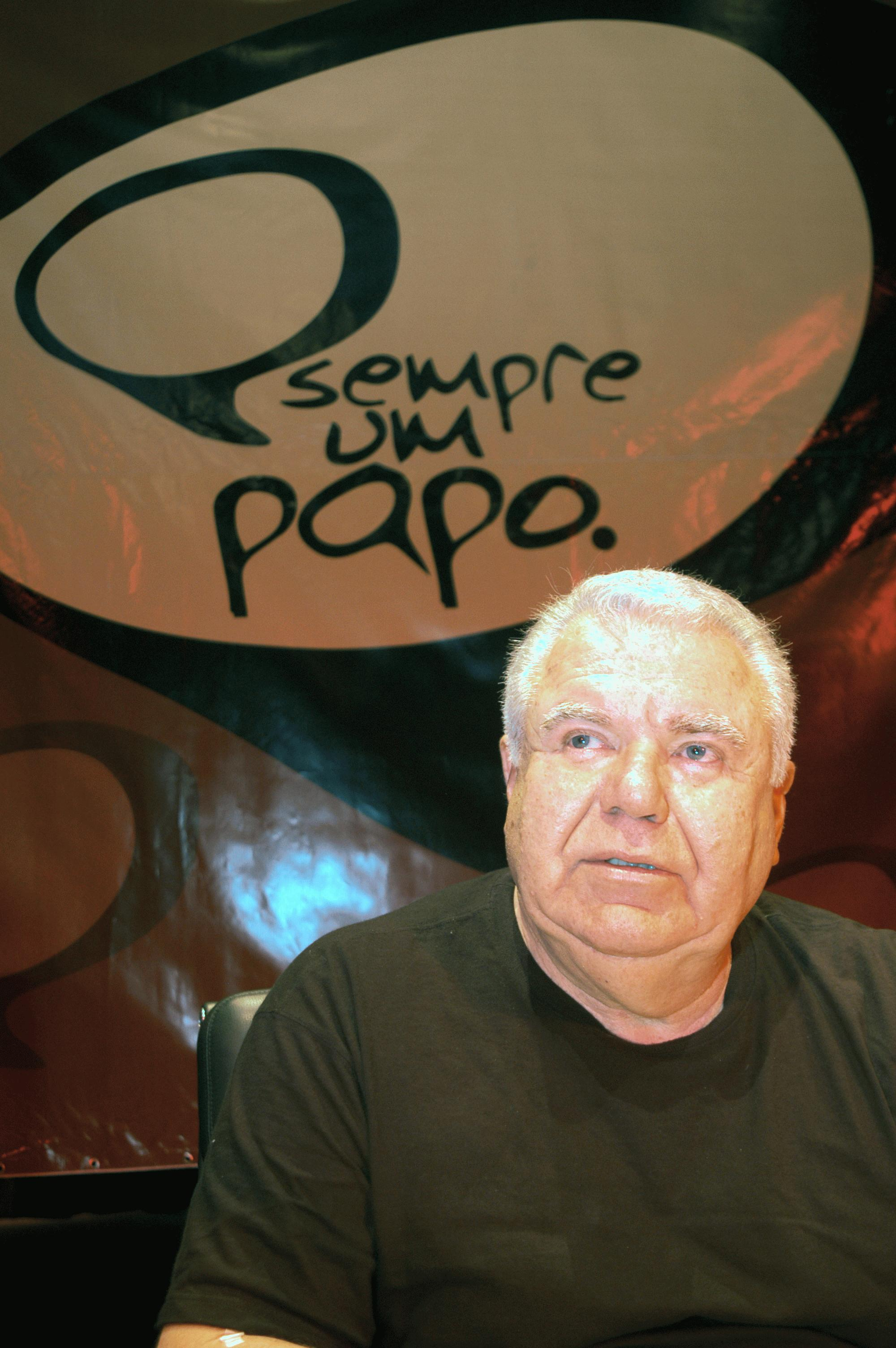
Jaime Lerner, former governor of Paraná

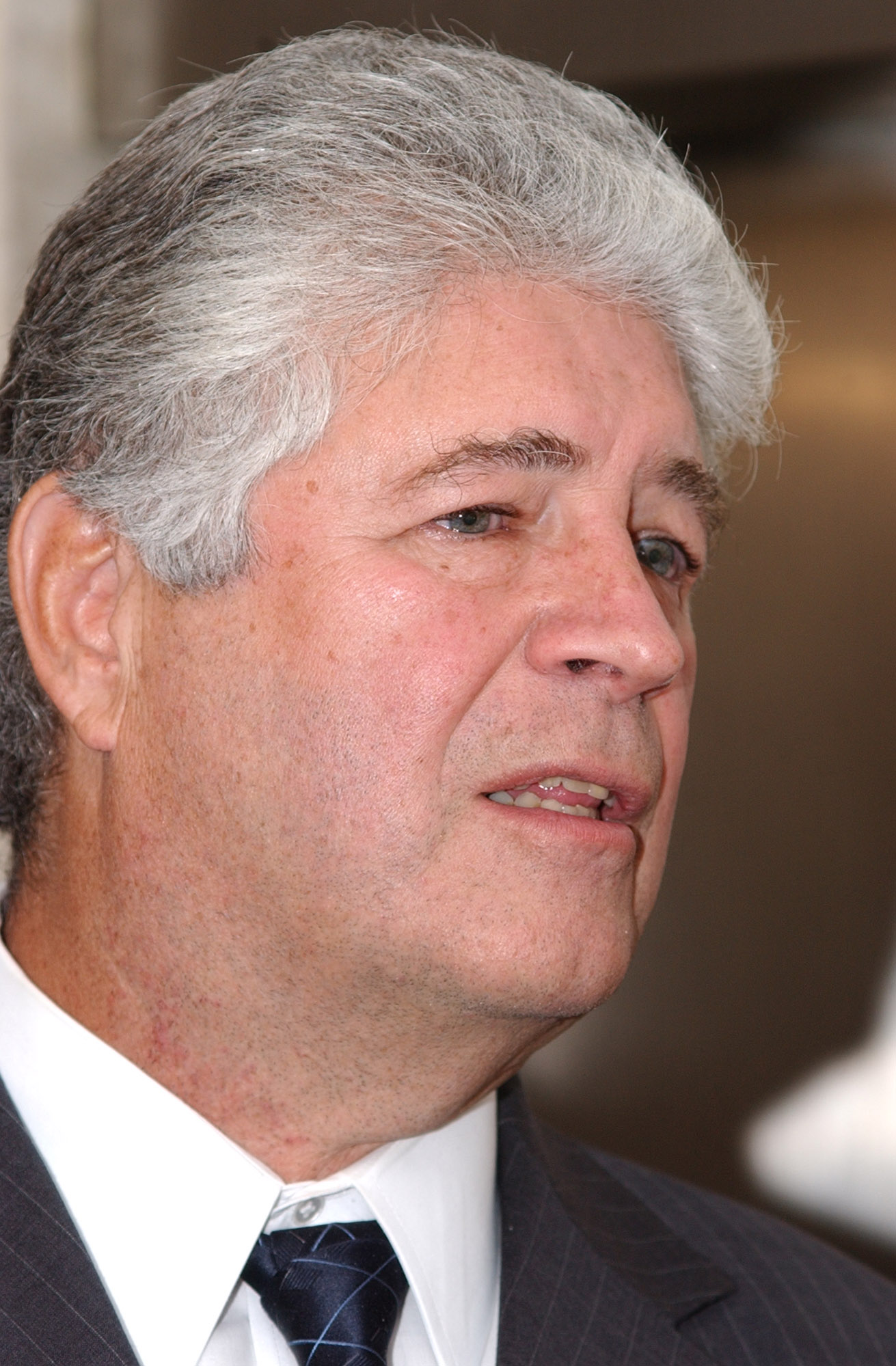
Roberto Requião, senator and former governor of Paraná

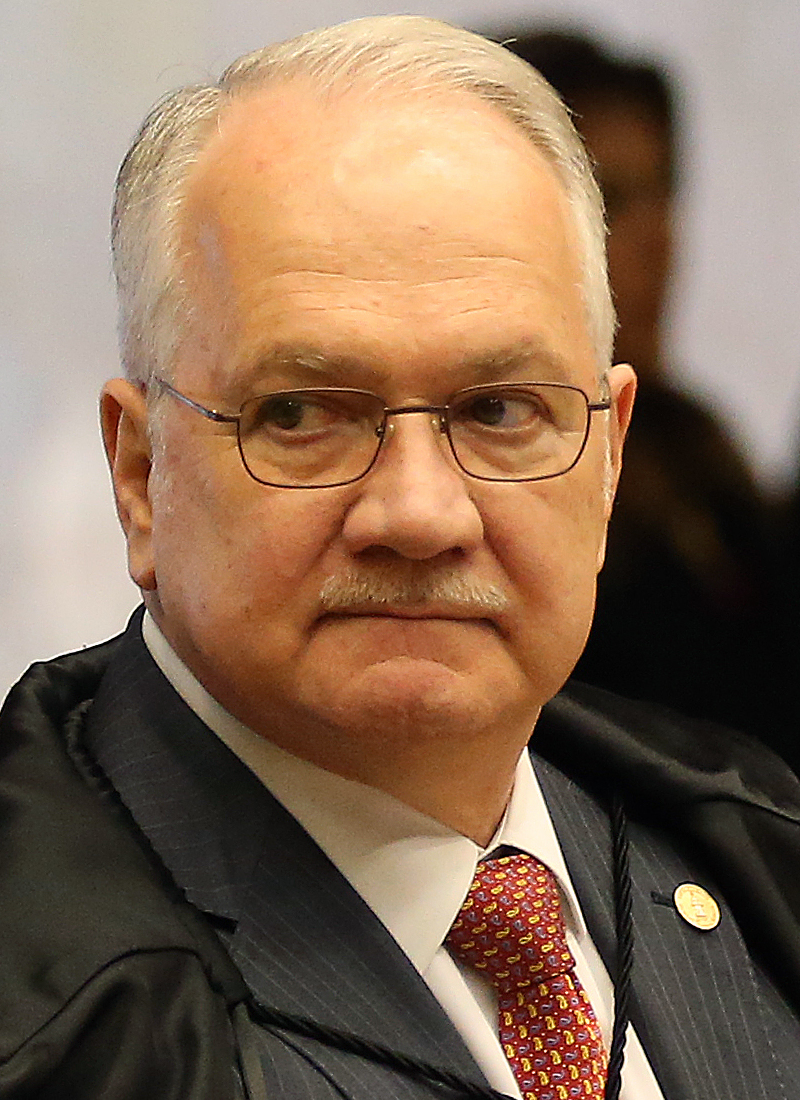
Luiz Edson Fachin, incumbent minister of the Supreme Court of Brazil

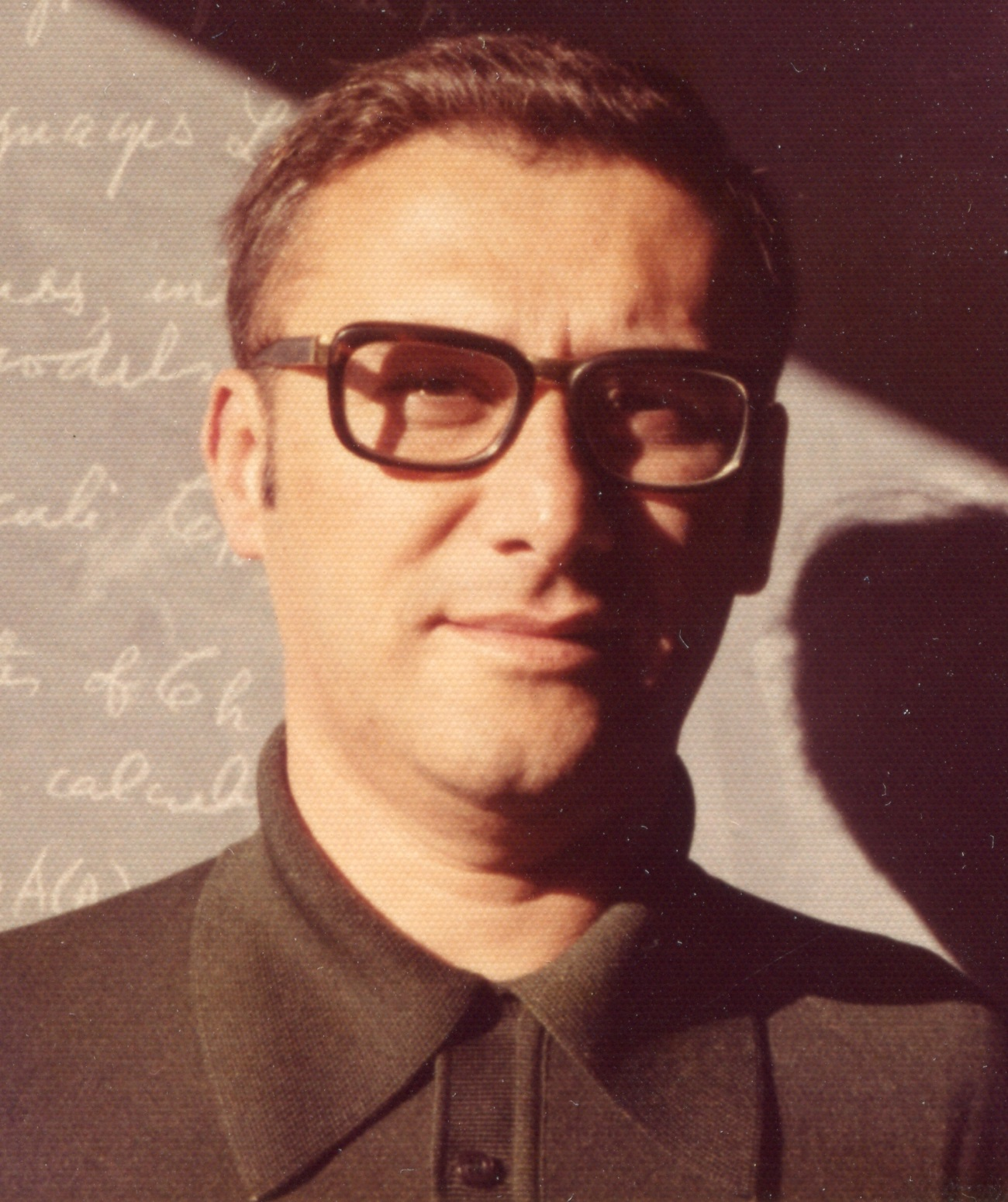
Newton da Costa, logician and mathematician

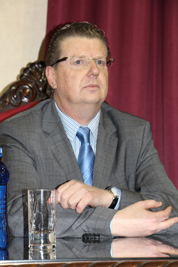
Clèmerson Merlin Clève, jurist, lawyer, and entrepreneur

== See also ==
- Brazil University Rankings
- List of federal universities of Brazil
- Universities and Higher Education in Brazil
