= Municipal Guards =

Municipal police forces of Brazil

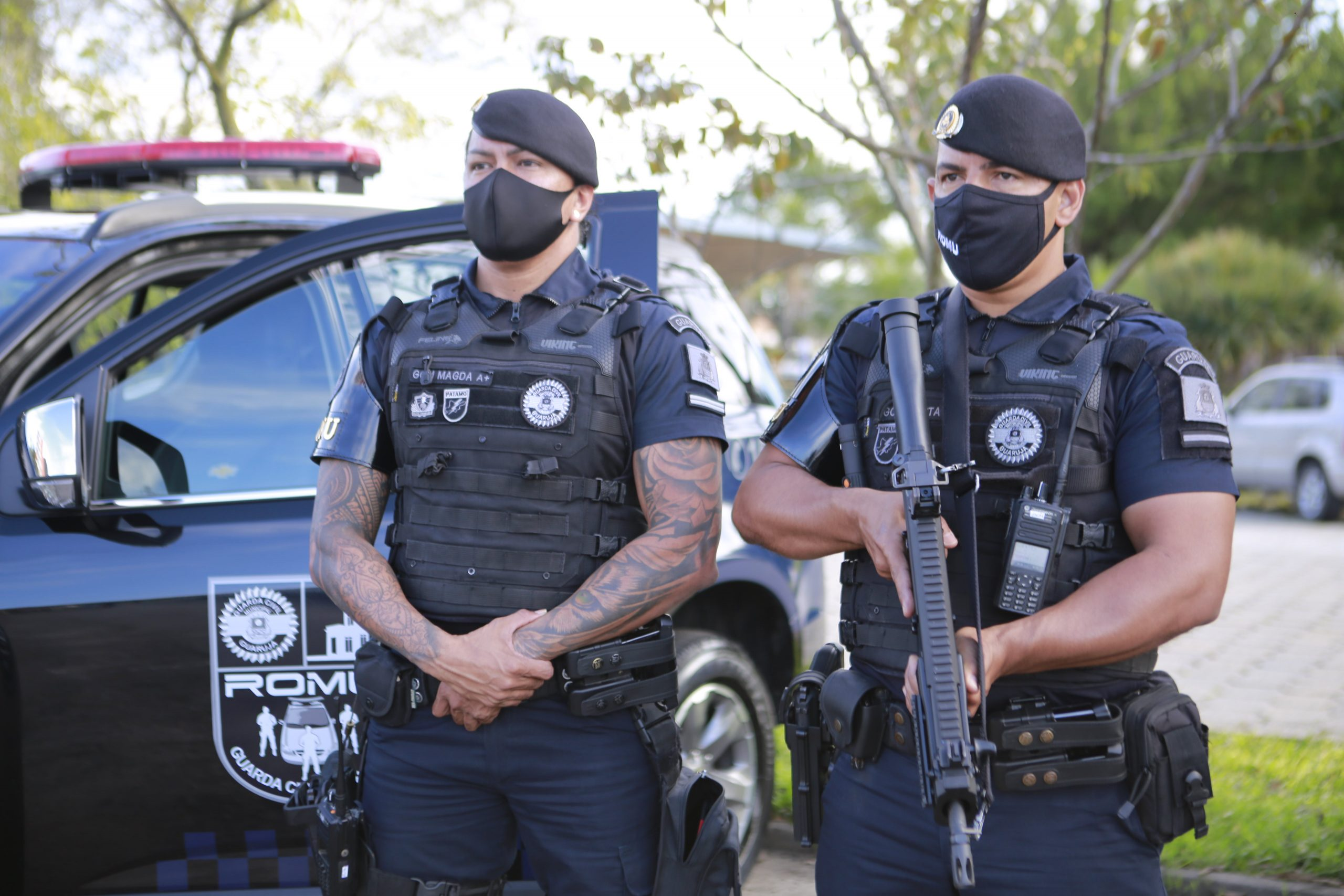
Municipal Guards from the ROMU of Guarujá, São Paulo during COVID-19 pandemic in 2022.

Municipal Guards (Portuguese: Guardas Municipais, singular: Guarda Municipal), also called the Municipal Civil Guards (Guardas Civis Municipais, singular: Guarda Civil Municipal), are the security police forces of municipalities (cities) of Brazil. They are subordinated to the municipality mayors (prefeitos). Trained as a civilian uniformed agency, the city guards are primarily responsible for protecting municipal properties, facilities, and installations, according to the Brazilian Federal Constitution.

Their patrols are called rondas (rounds) and there are 1,200 municipalities with Municipal Guards with more than 120,000 operatives according to the Brazilian Institute of Geography and Statistics.

== Legal basis ==
The Brazilian Federal Constitution, Title III, Article 144, § (paragraph 8th) defines the mission of The Municipal Guards: And federal law 14022 of 2014. redefining the guards' minimum operating principles. The minimum principles of action of municipal guards are:

I - protection of fundamental human rights, the exercise of citizenship and public freedoms;
II - preservation of life, reduction of suffering and reduction of losses;
III - preventive patrolling;
IV - commitment to the social evolution of the community; and

1. "...Protection of goods, services and facilities..." (ipsis literis citation)
2. Organizing, directing and monitoring vehicle traffic in their territory
3. Ensuring the right of the community to enjoy or use public goods, obeying the legal requirements
4. Protecting the environment and historical, cultural and ecological heritage of the municipality
5. Providing assistance for domestic and foreign tourists

== Civil Guard ==
The Municipal Civil Guard is a type of municipal civil police which can be created by specific laws of the chamber of the councilmen of the city as an instrument for public security in the city. Its components possess the same prerogatives and legal obligations as the municipality's employees. The GCM, as it is known, can still assist the other agencies of public security, such as: the Federal Police, Federal Road Police, Federal Railroad Police, Civil Police, (including the Superintendence of State Scientific Police Service) and the Military Police including the Corps of Military Firemen. Based in some stare decisis of the Supreme Federal Court, the scientific police is organized by the states and The Caput of Article 144 is merely exemplary and is no longer considered an explicit authorization.

In São Paulo they receive the name Metropolitan Civil Guard. The use of navy blue uniforms for the Guards has been stipulated. In Rio de Janeiro it is only called only Municipal Guard and the uniform color is khakis. The Civil Guards are organizations of civil, not militarized organizations. Civil Guards are authorized to carry firearms only allowed with legal authorization and the transport is granted by the Federal government (Policy Statute of the Disarmament).

Up to 1965, the Civil Police of the most populous States of Brazil had in its administrative structure a full integration with the Civil Guard, but the police reforms at the beginning of the 20th century and designated them as preventive police, together, with the Military Police. These reforms were made more clear in the Coup D'état on March 30, 1964; which ended autonomy in the Brazilian federal subjects (the Union, the Federal District, The States of Union and the Autonomal Municipalities). The idea was to eliminate any resistance against the military regime. The overreaching goal of the act was to eliminate the Republican State Civilian Guardas as well as the Republican Municipal Civilian Guardas.

The deriving government of the Military Coup of '64, establishing rigid control on the municipal and state uniformed police forces, extinguished the Civil Guards and many Municipal Guards too. They also succeeded in regulating the supervisory norms of the Army on the Military Police and nominated an official of the Army to command them in all the States.

== Constitutional Amendment ==
There is a PEC (Proposal of Constitutional Amendment, PEC nº 534/2002) which would change the Brazilian City/Municipal Guards' constitutional status. If approved, the good use of police power will be regulated by every Municipal Guard Corps to serve and protect the Brazilian cities and citizens, transforming these corporations into law enforcement agencies de jure (the Brazilian people consider the Guardas policemen de facto, and the Brazilian Ministry of Justice are treating the guards as constables. However, the Brazilian State Police Forces do not agree with this ideal- Indeed, all the municipal guard operatives accuse the State sheriffs and colonels of interfering in the municipality's autonomy. In Portuguese, this act is called "ingerência").

The PEC was approved in the Brazilian Federal Senate and the Brazilian Federal House of Representatives Justice Commission (now it is waiting to be approved in the Brazilian Federal House of Representatives, in two voting sessions, with open vote).

== See also ==
- Brazilian Federal Police
- Civil Police of Brazilian States
- Law enforcement in Brazil
- Força Nacional de Segurança
- Military of Brazil
- Military Police of Brazilian States

http://www.planalto.gov.br/ccivil_03/_ato2011-2014/2014/lei/l13022.htm
