= Polícia =

Polícia means police in some languages. Policia may refer to:

== Law enforcement ==
=== Spanish terms ===
- Policía Federal Argentina (Argentine Federal Police)
- Policía Nacional de Colombia (National Police of Colombia)
- Policía Nacional del Perú (National Police of Peru)
- Cuerpo Nacional de Policía (National Police Corps of Spain)

=== Portuguese terms ===
- Brazil:
  - Polícia Civil (Civil Police (Brazil))
  - Polícia Federal (Federal Police (Brazil))
  - Polícia Ferroviária (Federal Railroad Police)
  - Polícia Militar (Military Police (Brazil))
  - Polícia Rodoviária (Federal Highway Police)
- Polícia de Segurança Pública, Portugal
- Guarda nacional Republicana, Portugal
- Corpo de Polícia de Segurança Pública, Macau

=== Albanian terms ===
- Policia e Shtetit (Albanian Police)

=== Slovak terms ===
- Polícia (Slovak Police)

== Music ==
- "Polícia" (song), a song by the Brazilian rock band Titãs
