= Law enforcement in Brazil =

In Brazil, the Federal Constitution establishes eight law enforcement institutions - seven titulars and one auxiliar. The titular institutions are: the Federal Police, the Federal Highway Police, the Federal Railroad Police, the Federal Penal Police, the State Military Police and Fire Brigade, the State Civil Police and the State Penal Police. Of these, the first four are affiliated to federal authorities and the latter three are subordinated to state governments. These public safety institutions are part of the Executive branch of either federal or state government. Apart from these eight institutions, there are others which affiliate to municipal authorities: the Municipal Guards. According to Minister Alexandre de Moraes of the Supreme Federal Court, "...the Municipal Guards are inserted in public safety as the auxiliary and related body of public security force..." Federal law 13,022 (in effect since August 8, 2014) effectively gave them policing powers.

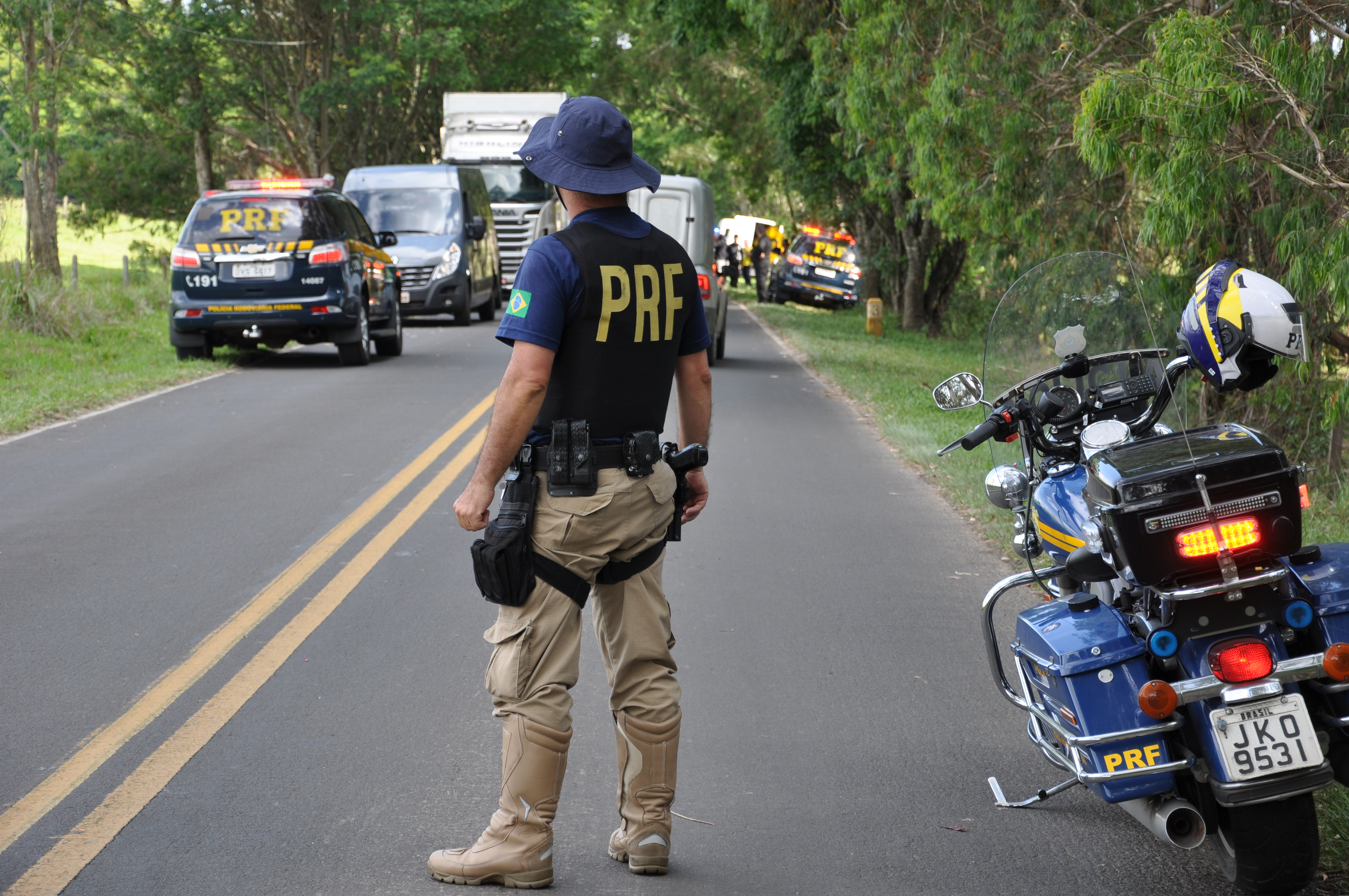
Federal Highway Police (Polícia Rodoviária Federal)

According to the Supreme Federal Tribunal, Law enforcement forces with an obligation to maintain public safety by Brazilian law are the ones listed in article 144 of the Federal Constitution's Caput, that is, the first seven aforementioned forces. As a new force cited in the Federal Constitution Article 144, Eighth Paragraph; the guards act in support and complement - without a relationship of subordination with them. In case of criminal occurrence (in flagrante delicto), Guards forward the occurrence to the Civil and/or Federal police.

There are two primary police functions: maintaining order and law enforcement. When criminal offences affect federal entities, federal police forces carry out those functions. In the remaining cases, the state police forces undertake police activities.

== History ==
The first groups assigned with security duties in Brazilian territory date back to the early sixteenth century. Small, incipient units were designated in the Brazilian coastline, with the main function of fending off hostile foreign invaders. In 1566, the first police investigator of Rio de Janeiro was recruited. By the seventeenth century, most "capitanias" already had local units with law enforcement functions. On July 9, 1775, a Cavalry Regiment was created in Minas Gerais for maintaining order. At the time, intense gold mining had attracted attention and greed of explorers, generating tensions in the area.

In 1808, the Portuguese royal family relocated to Brazil, due to the French invasion of Portugal. King João VI sought to reshape the administrative structure of the colony. Among several reforms, he established the "Intendência Geral de Polícia" (General Police Intendancy), which merged police units with investigative functions, call currently of Civil Police. He also created a Military Guard with police functions on 13 May 1809. This is considered a predecessor force of local military police units. Later, in 1831, when independence had already been declared, each province started organizing its local "military police", with order maintenance tasks.

On 31 January 1842, law 261 was enacted, reorganizing the investigative offices, the current "civil police".

The first federal police force, the Federal Railroad Police, was created in 1852.

Finally, in 1871, law 2033 separated police and judicial functions, creating the general bureaucratic structure and mechanisms still adopted nowadays by local police forces. In 1944, a federal police institution was created. The current Federal Police department was conceived on November 16, 1964. During the military dictatorship, some political police organizations were maintained, such as the DOI-CODI.

== Primary functions ==
Law enforcement and maintaining order are the two primary functions of Brazilian police units. In Brazilian Law, maintaining order is considered a preventive effort whereby police troopers patrol the streets to protect citizens and discourage criminal activity. Law enforcement consists of criminal investigation after an offence.

Prevention and investigation in Brazil are divided between two distinct police organizations. State "military police" forces only have order maintenance duties. Correspondingly, "civil police" institutions are responsible solely for crime investigation. However, at the federal level, the Federal Police is commissioned with both preventive and investigative functions of federal crimes.

== Federal institutions ==
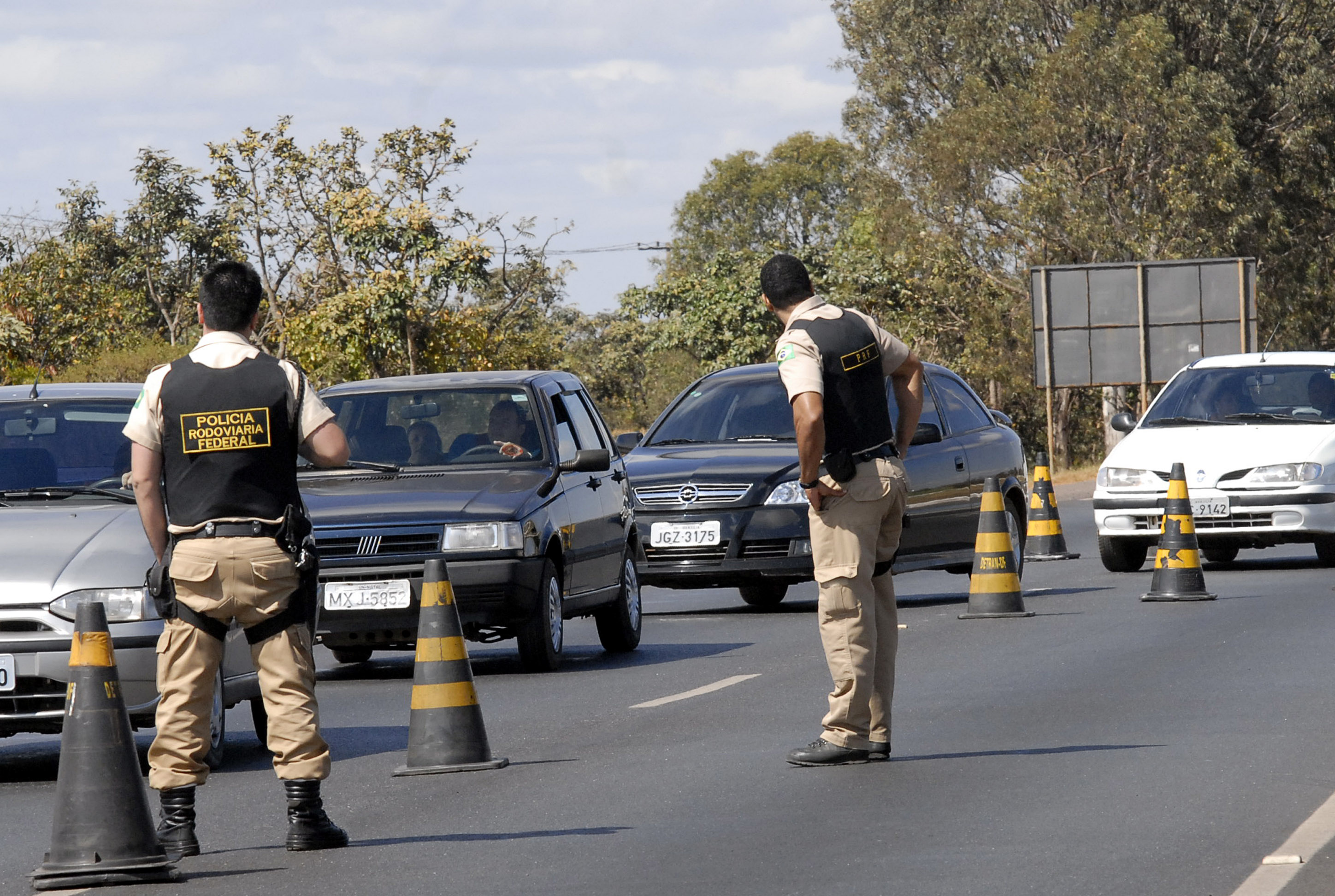
Federal Highway Police (Polícia Rodoviária Federal)

There are four federal police institutions in Brazil: the Federal Police, the Federal Highway Police, the Federal Railway Police, and the Federal Penal Police.

- The Federal Police, officially the Departamento de Polícia Federal investigates of crimes against the Federal Government or its organs and companies, combats international drug trafficking and terrorism, and conducts immigration and border control (including airport and seaport policing). It is directly subordinated to the Ministry of Justice and Public Security (Brazil).
- The Federal Highway Police has the main function of patrolling federal highways. It maintains order, but does not investigate crime.
- The Federal Railway Police, is the third and last component of the federal police force. Its main function is patrolling the federal railway system. It does not investigate crime, solely focusing on maintaining order. As of 2022, the agency is not functional.
- The Federal Penal Police was created by the Federal Constitutional Amendment number 104 (in effect since December 4, 2019), and its officers originate from the bodies of federal prison agencies.

== State institutions ==
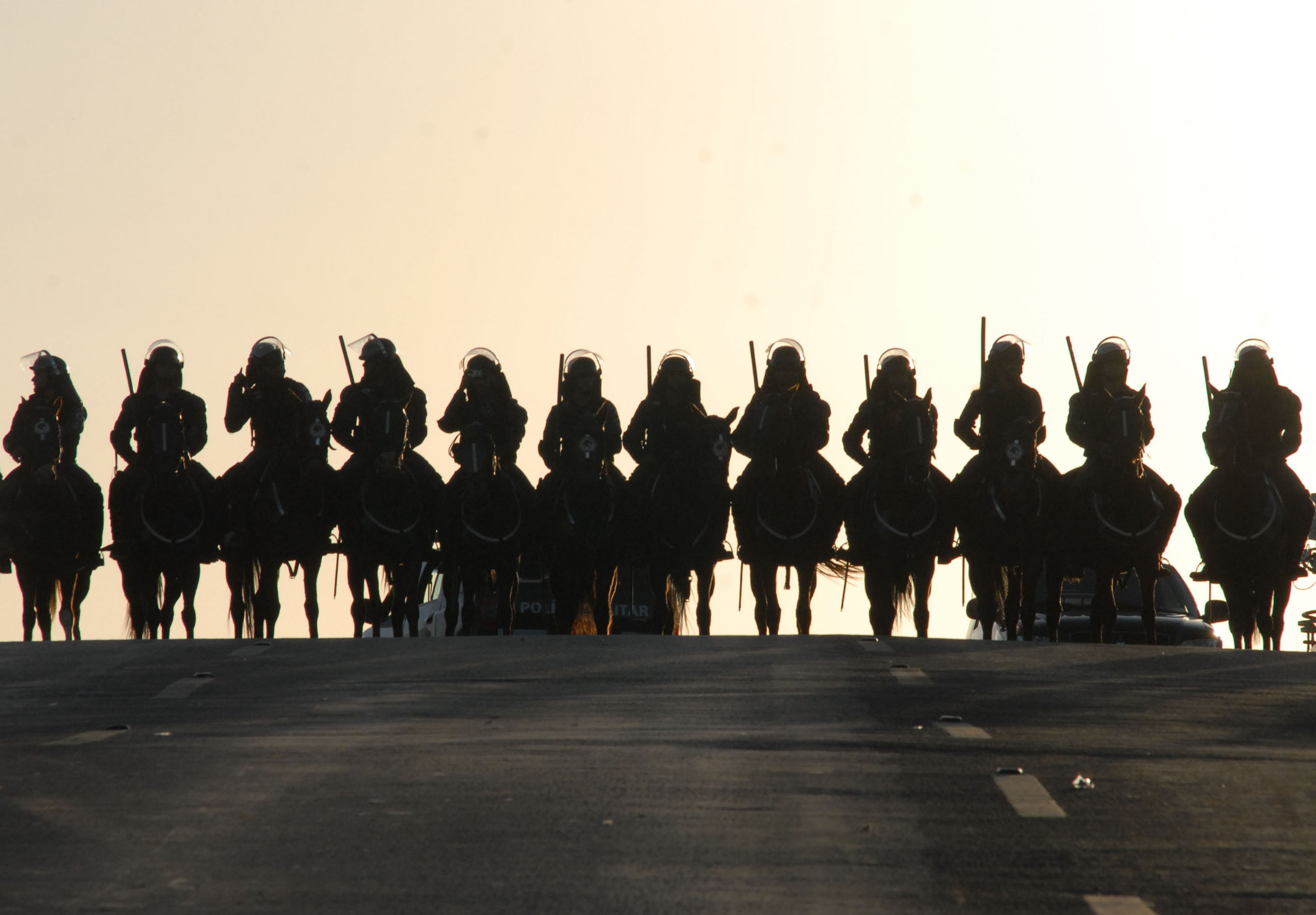
Mounted Police branch of the Federal District Military Police, during crowd control activities.

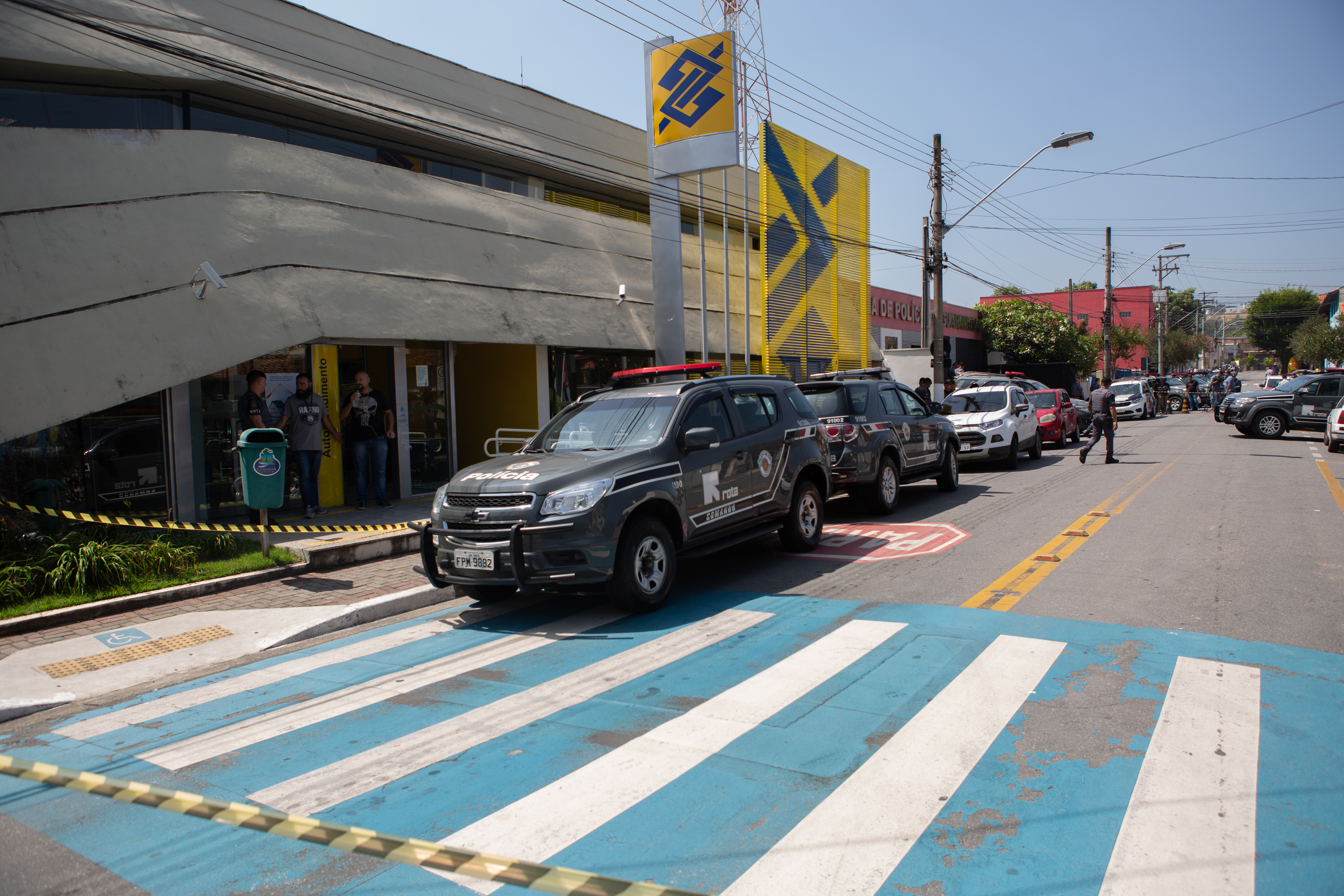
Police car of ROTA a special force of the Military Police of São Paulo (PMESP)

There are three types of state police institutions: the Military Police/Military Firefighters Corps, the Civil Police and the State Penal Police.

- The Military Police and Fire Brigade are charged with maintaining order. Military police patrols the streets and imprison suspects, either handing them over to Civil Police custody or, in case of federal crimes, to the Federal Police. It is a "militarized" institution (gendarmerie) because it is based on military principles of hierarchy, uniform, discipline, and ceremony. However, the body is not a branch of the Brazilian Armed Forces. It is described by the constitution as an "auxiliary force of the Brazilian Army in time of war". The Military Fire Brigade, in general, is a part of the Military Police, although it does not perform traditional policing duties. It is subordinated to the state government. However, in the States of Rio de Janeiro and Minas Gerais, the Military Fire Brigade is an autonomous military corporation, part of State Department of Civil Defense.
- The Civil Police has criminal law enforcement duties and investigates crimes committed in violation of Brazilian criminal law. It does not patrol the streets and generally does not wear uniforms. Like the Military Police, it is subordinated to the state government.
- The State Penal Police, like its sister federal agency, was created by the Federal Constitutional Amendment number 104 (December 4, 2019), and its officers originate from the bodies of state prison agencies.

== Municipal institutions ==
The Municipal Guards (Portuguese: Guardas Municipais singular: Guarda Municipal), also called the Municipal Civil Guards (Guardas Civis Municipais, singular: Guarda Civil Municipal), are the security forces of municipalities of Brazil. Created in the time of the Empire of Brazil, the guardsmen are subordinated to the municipality mayors. Organized as a Municipal police and trained as a civilian uniformed agency, the city guards are responsible to police the municipal parks, properties, installations and the interior of municipal councils and city halls, according to the Brazilian Federal Constitution. Their patrols are called rondas (English for rounds) and there are 1,200 municipalities with Municipal Guards with more than 120,000 operatives according with the Brazilian Institute of Geography and Statistics. They are treated as police officers by the former president of the IPA (International Police Association) Brazilian section, Mr. George Henry Millard. The former Brazilian Minister of Justice and former governor of the state of Rio Grande do Sul, Mr. Tarso Genro, asked for them to be given more jurisdiction for their operatives, and especially for their official recognition by Brazil as public safety workers.

== Other security forces ==
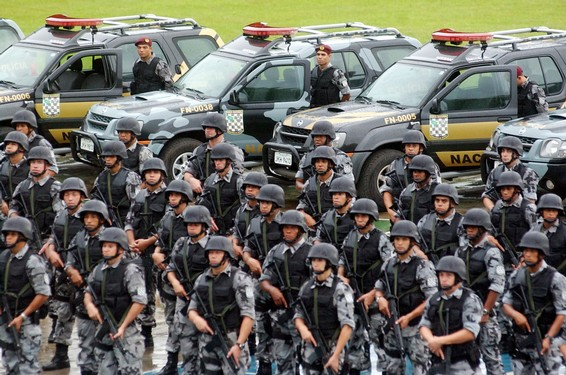
National Public Security Force (Força Nacional de Segurança Pública)

- The National Public Security Force, officially the Força Nacional de Segurança Pública, was created by presidential decree 5.289 on November 29, 2004. It is not a security force per se. Rather, it is a federal program of cooperation among all Brazilian police forces for situations of emergency or exceptional nature.
- Army, Navy and Air Force police units are not to be confused with the state Military Police. These are internal security units of each Armed Forces branch. They do not have general civil order maintenance or law enforcement functions. Other internal units may be created for protection of particular agencies or administrative entities, such as the guards of legislative houses, which do not have public safety functions. Nevertheless, in times of emergency, the Army has been called upon to maintain order, most notably in Rio de Janeiro. There are provost corps for each of the Brazilian Armed Forces: Army Police (Portuguese: Polícia do Exército, PE) for the Army, specific Marine units for the Navy, and Air Force Police (Portuguese: Polícia da Aeronáutica) for the Air Force.
- The Chamber of Deputies, the Federal Senate and the state level legislatures keep security police agencies of their own, similar to the capitol police forces in the United States.
- The security forces of the Judiciary are at times also referred to as police.

== Entry qualification ==
Access to all positions under any military police forces encompasses written knowledge tests, previous and further medical exams, physical strength, agility and endurance tests and, finally, psychological interviews and evaluation. When approved on all tests, the candidate will be considered fit to military police service and admitted in special training courses (CTSP, to graduate soldiers, and the CFO, to graduate aspiring high-ranked officials). There's a minimum entry age of 18 years and, with few variations, a maximum entry age of 30 years.

Candidates to military police lower ranks, such as 2nd class soldier (entry level), must meet a minimum of high school education.

In the Civil Police as well as in the Federal Police, police commissioners ("delegados") are responsible for coordinating and conducting all criminal investigations, with very similar functions and powers of those held by instruction magistrates or prosecutors in other legal systems. For that reason, those police commissioners are required to hold a full degree in Law and have law practicing or law enforcement experience of at least three years.

== Misconduct ==
Reports of police misconduct, such as brutality and corruption, have harmed the reputation of police institutions in Brazil, especially state forces. Violence against suspects and extrajudicial executions are known to be employed by police. In the cities of São Paulo and Rio de Janeiro, the Military Police has been involved in several controversial massacres of civilians, typically in poor neighborhoods where high-profile criminals tend to hide. There have also been massacres in prison facilities. One of the most notorious cases is the Carandiru massacre of 1992. Torture is still commonly used as means of questioning and punishing individuals. Brazil's corrections system is a huge problem for the country and it severely affects the overall well-being of its people. There are a lot of problems relating to violence, gangs and the way the government has been handling the problems. Brazil's corrections system is under the prison administration called Departamento Penitenciário Nacional (DEPEN), and the head of this prison administration is Renato Campos Pinto de Vitto.

The "favelas" (slums or shantytowns) in Brazil have many criminal gangs within them that protect individual favelas from other rival gangs and law enforcement. The government has been seen as "ineffective" towards criminal activity within favelas and Brazil as a whole such as trafficking of humans and drugs, kidnapping, and robberies. Corruption and crime levels within Brazil remain high and Bolsonaro's administration has aimed to help decrease these levels with the help of the police. Bolsonaro mentioned on his own social media page that criminals "should be" attacked by police officials, which can aid to the decrease in crime, thus creating a larger distrust towards law enforcement in Brazil.

The prison population has grown significantly in the twenty-first century. In 2000, 232,755 people were incarcerated in Brazil, an d by 2020, the mean prison population in Brazil was 811,707, which is 381 per 100,000. On 31 December 2020 there were 235,051 under house arrest. There were 1,387 institutions in the Brazilian corrections system. The official capacity of the institutions is 494 379.

As of 2017, the President of Brazil Michel Temer, aimed to build 30 prisons that year to tackle the overcrowding crisis of their institutions. Brazil's prisons are 50% over capacity, and most of the prisons are state-government run. The prisons are heavily controlled by gangs, drugs, guns and other contraband entering the prisons regularly. Many residents of favelas do not trust law enforcement because in 2008, the police killed an average of three people for every twenty-three people they arrested in Brazil. Crime levels are high due to extreme poverty levels and law enforcement refusing to patrol favelas. One of the more recent riots occurred between Brazil's most powerful gang, First Capital Command, and their rival, Red command. First Capital Command slaughtered 26 other inmates at the Alcaçuz Prison in the state of Rio Grande do Norte. President Temer wants to build these new prisons to separate non-violent criminals from the dangerous ones to prevent recruitment into organized crime. Since a big part of their prison population problems are the gangs, President Temer has also said that Brazil will be more cooperative with neighboring countries to try to reduce gangs funded by drug trafficking. Some prisons are close to three times their intended capacity . The frequent use of pepper spray, tear gas, noise bombs and rubber bullets has been documented, as have severe beatings and kicking by the prison personnel on the inmates. Prison personnel are equipped with assault rifles, shotguns and handguns to protect themselves from the violent events in the prisons and also to keep order of the super overcrowded prisons where inmates could otherwise easily overcome the employees.

== See also ==
- Brazilian Intelligence Agency
- Brazilian police militias
- Corruption in Brazil
- Crime in Brazil
- List of scandals in Brazil
- Brazilian Military Criminal Code
