= Ministry of Justice and Public Security (Brazil) =

Justice ministry of Brazil

- Portuguese: Ministério da Justiça e Segurança Pública

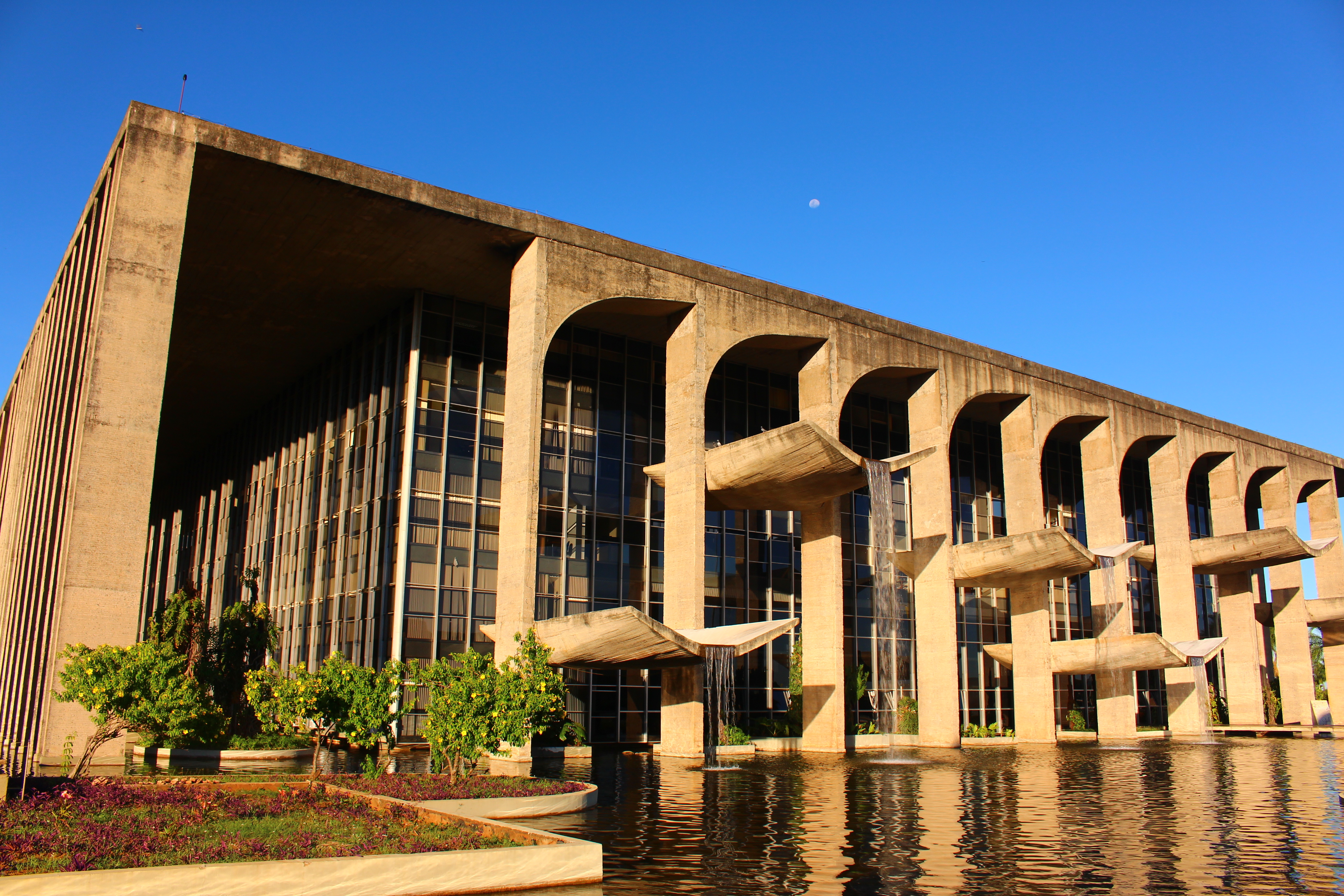
- Palace of Justice

Agency overview
- Formed: 3 July 1822; 204 years ago
- Type: Ministry
- Jurisdiction: Federal government of Brazil
- Headquarters: Esplanada dos Ministérios, Bloco T Brasília, Federal District
- Annual budget: $19.41 b BRL (2023)
- Agency executives: Wellington Lima e Silva, Minister; Manoel de Almeida Neto, Executive-Secretary; Jean Keiji Uema, Secretary of Justice; Paulo Rodrigues Pereira, Secretary of Consumer; Marta Rodriguez Machado, Secretary of Drug Policy and Assets Management; Mario Sarrubbo, Secretary of Public Security; André Garcia, Secretary of Penal Policy; Sheila Santana de Carvalho, Secretary of Access to Justice; Lilian Cintra de Melo, Secretary of Digital Rights
- Website: www.gov.br/mj/

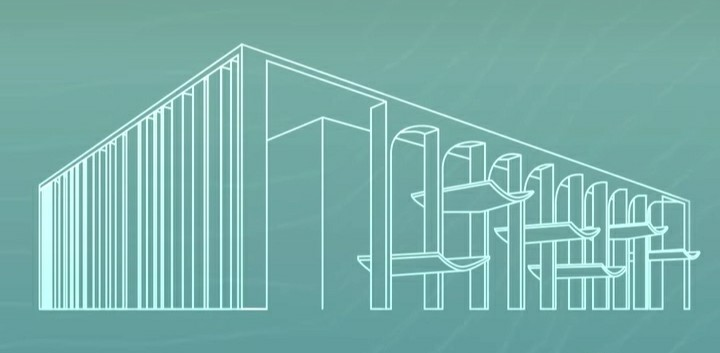
Building logo.

The Ministry of Justice and Public Security (Portuguese: Ministério da Justiça e Segurança Pública), previously known as Ministry of Justice (Portuguese: Ministério da Justiça) and Ministry of Justice and Citizenship (Portuguese: Ministério da Justiça e Cidadania), is a cabinet-level federal ministry in Brazil. The current minister is Wellington Lima e Silva.

== Divisions and programs ==
- The Brazilian National Archives.
- The Administrative Council for Economic Defense (CADE), which regulates economic power and its abuse.
- The Brazilian advisory rating system (ClassInd), which establishes the ratings for movies, TV shows, and video games within Brazil.
- The Federal Police of Brazil, which provides law enforcement of federal laws, acting as a Federal Judicial Police. It has juristicion in interstate and/or international cases, acting in cooperation with a US federal law enforcement agency, for example: the FBI and the DEA.
- The Federal Highway Police (DPRF), which provides the law enforcement of the federal highways.
- The Federal Railroad Police (PFF), which provides the law enforcement of the federal railroads.
- The National Consumer Secretariat (Secretaria Nacional do Consumidor; SENACON), with the mission of protecting consumer rights and promoting consumer relations

== See also ==
- List of ministers of justice of Brazil
- Attorney General of Brazil
- Justice ministry
- Politics of Brazil
- Prosecutor General of Brazil
- Public Prosecutor's Office of Brazil
- FUNAI
- Other ministries of justice
