= Federal Railroad Police =

Federal Railroad Police Polícia Ferroviária Federal
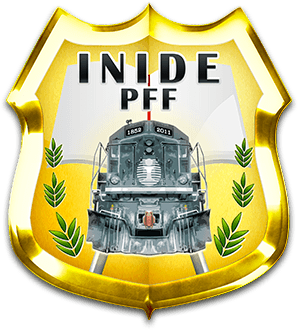
- INIDE PFF emblem, the institute currently responsible for the Brazilian Federal Railroad Police
- Abbreviation: PFF

Agency overview
- Formed: 26 June 1852

Jurisdictional structure
- Federal agency: Brazil
- Operations jurisdiction: Brazil
- General nature: Federal law enforcement; Civilian police
- Specialist jurisdiction: Railways, tramways, rail transit systems

Operational structure
- Headquarters: Brasília, Brazil
- Sworn members: Agency not active

Website
- inidepff.com.br

The Brazilian Federal Railroad Police (US English) or Federal Railway Police (British English) (Portuguese: Polícia Ferroviária Federal) is a police agency founded in 1852 which is responsible for patrols and security on federal railways in Brazil. According to Federal Marshals, the Federal Railway Police does not have an active work force, its name still remains, even without practical use. As of 2021, a bill is in course to promote the Railway Police and turn its creation effective.

== History ==
The PFF was created in 1852, by decree of the emperor Dom Pedro II. It was the first police agency in Brazil and was created to protect railroad cargo. There are some proposals in the Brazilian Senate to reactivate this police agency, as it is considered important to national security. With the considerable amount of railway lines in Brazil being privatized in 1996, the function of this agency has become even more limited, leading to their gradual disappearance.

== Federal Constitution ==
The Brazilian Constitution of 1988 brings in its article 144, paragraph 3º, a text where it mentions and it regularizes the presence of this institution: § 3º - the federal railway police, permanent agency, organized and maintained by the Union and structured in career, is intended, in the law format, to the ostensible patrolling of the federal railroads.

== See also ==
- Rail transport in Brazil
- Brazilian Federal Police
- Military Police of Brazilian States
- Policing in Brazil
- Civil Police of Brazilian States
- Brazilian Federal Highway Police
- National Force
