= Federal Highway Police =

Brazilian highway police

Federal Highway Police Polícia Rodoviária Federal
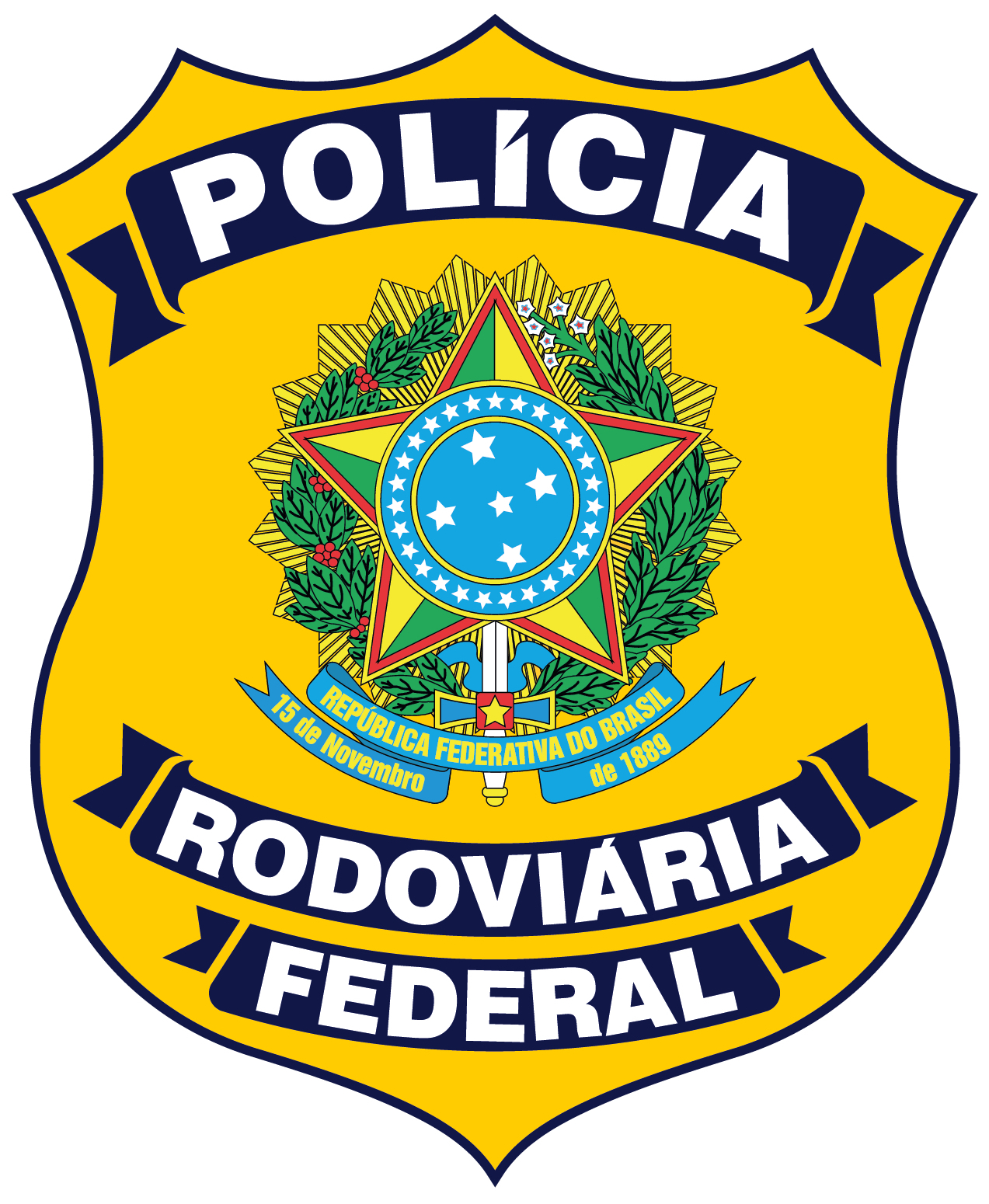
- Emblem of the PRF

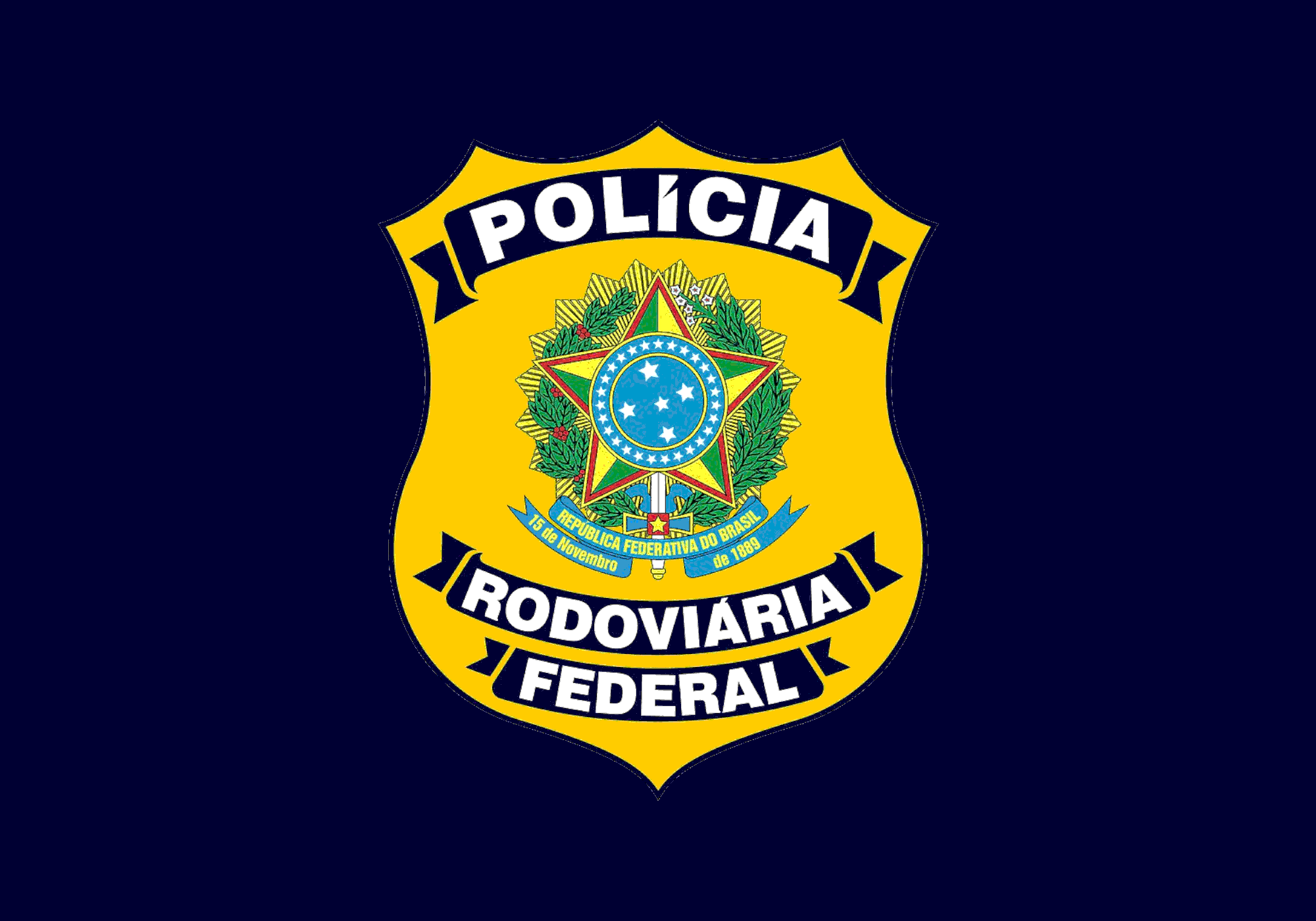
- Flag of the PRF
- Abbreviation: PRF

Agency overview
- Formed: July 24, 1928
- Employees: 11,157 officers as of 20 June 2015

Jurisdictional structure
- Federal agency: Brazil
- Operations jurisdiction: Brazil
- General nature: Federal law enforcement; Civilian police

Operational structure
- Headquarters: SPO, QUADRA 3, LOTE 5, Brasília, DF, Brazil
- Agency executive: Antônio Fernando Souza Oliveira, Diretor Geral
- Major units: 2: Division of Airborne Operations (DOA); National Highway Police Academy (ANPR)

Website
- www.prf.gov.br

The Brazilian Federal Highway Police (Portuguese: Polícia Rodoviária Federal, PRF) is a federal highway patrol, subordinate to the Ministry of Justice and Public Security, whose main function is fighting crime on Brazilian federal roads and highways, as well as monitoring and supervising vehicular traffic, although it has also taken on duties that go beyond its original authority, such as action within Brazilian cities and forests in conjunction with other public safety agencies.

It was subordinate to the old National Department of Roadways (Departamento Nacional de Estradas de Rodagem or DNER), now the National Department of Transport Infrastructure (Departamento Nacional de Infra-Estrutura de Transportes or DNIT), until the publication of Law 8,028 of 12 April 1990, which redefined the structure of the Brazilian executive branch.

Its competences are defined by article 144 of the Federal Constitution, Law 9,503 (Brazilian Traffic Code), Decree 1655 of 3 October 1995 and its internal regulation, approved by Ministerial Decree 1,375 of 2 August 2007.

The title patrolman given to members was abolished in 1998 and replaced by the title policewoman/-man. Members of the PRF are divided into four classes: Third, Second, First and Special.

Since 2009, entry into the PRF has required a university degree recognized by the Ministry of Education, a condition now set out in Law 9,654.

== Organization ==
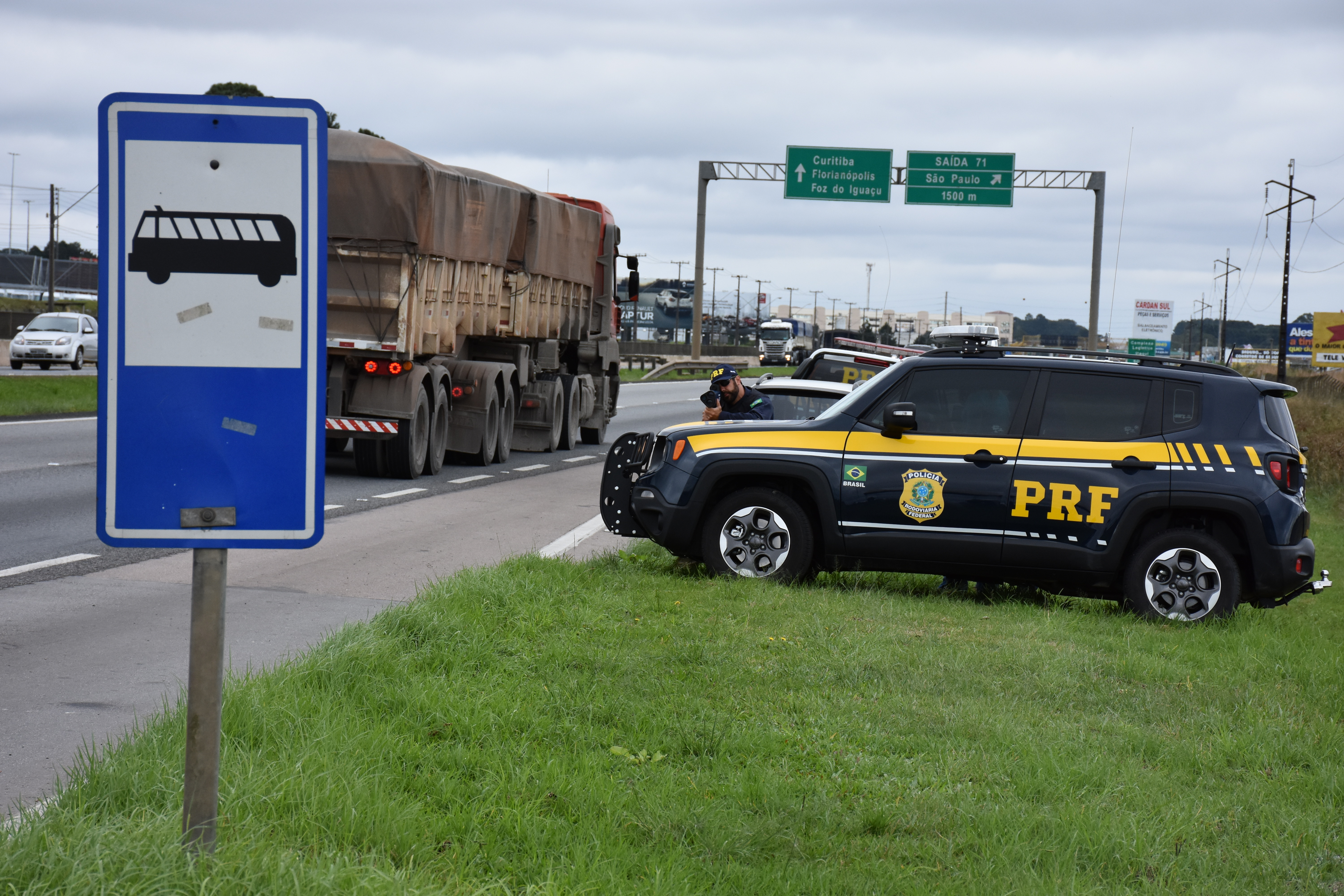
Federal Highway Police on a highway

The Federal Highway Police was created in 1928 during the administration of President Washington Luís, under the name Roadway Police (Polícia das Estradas).

It is present in all units of the federation and is managed by the Federal Highway Police Department (PRF), headquartered in Brasília. The states are divided into administrative units known as regions. A region can be a "superintendency", in the case of larger states, or a "district" in smaller states. Some regions encompass more than one Brazilian state. Regions are divided into "delegations", which coordinate the patrol posts.

The PRF has over four hundred patrol posts in municipalities throughout Brazil, giving the agency a widespread presence across the country.

Although its officers wear uniforms, the PRF is not a military institution and does not have a rigid hierarchy among its police officers. The hierarchy is based on supervisory functions, which can be held by any police officer; for example, a special agent may supervise an inspector.

The PRF, like other law enforcement agencies, also possesses specialized centers, such as the Special Operations Center (Núcleo de Operações Especiais or NOE), where its members receive regular training in more specialized forms of combat.

== Activities ==
=== Alert System ===
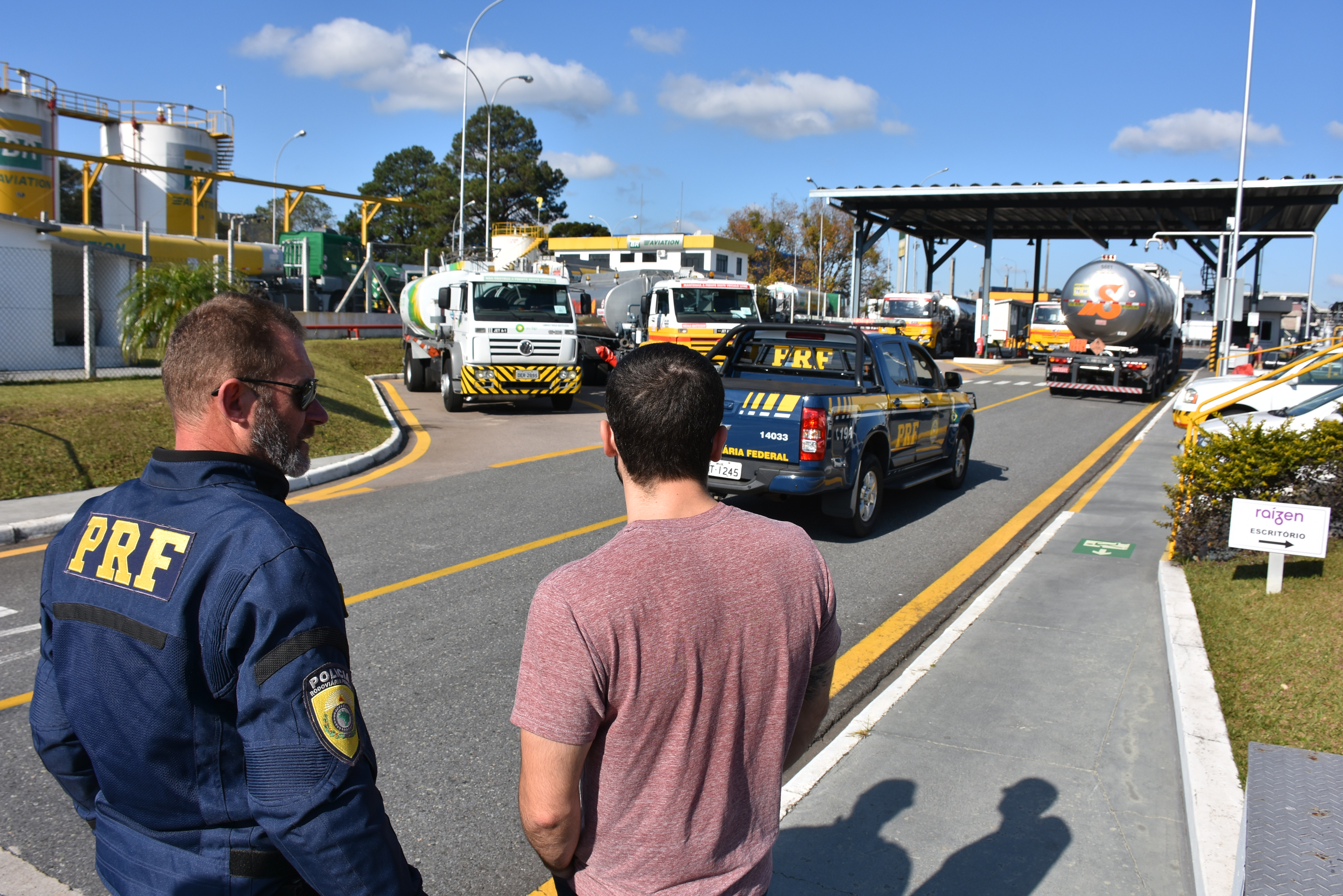
Federal Highway Police during an operation in Paraná.

The PRF operates an online alert system to combat vehicular theft.

After reporting a theft, the vehicle's owner must in most cases wait 24 hours for the report to be entered into the vehicular theft system. Sometimes this information takes over 24 hours to enter the Integrated Traffic System. Therefore, if the thief were stopped before this point, there would be no record of a stolen vehicle and the thief would not be prosecuted.

To address this deficiency, the Federal Highway Police Department created the Alert System, through which the owner can report a stolen vehicle via the Internet. The theft victim enters his or her vehicle's license plate number and all PRF patrol posts are immediately notified.

The system allows vehicle owners to communicate with the PRF instantly and without bureaucracy, speeding the transmission of information during the most critical period after a theft.

As a theft report is linked to a Police Incident Report, the objective of the system is to have a record of the theft information during the critical first 48 hours to aid in the recovery of the stolen vehicle. The system remains active for that license plate for 72 hours. After 72 hours, the theft report must be acted upon through the vehicular theft system of the traffic system, as the report at a delegation of the Civil Police will have concluded and been entered into the database.

The Alert System was created by PRF members with informatics degrees, who formed a program development center to facilitate and improve interactivity between police officers and vehicle owners.

=== Statistics ===
The Federal Highway Police Department publishes a statistical survey that is updated daily. The press and the public can access records of drug seizures and recoveries of stolen vehicles.

By comparing the information available on one day with that published on the next, any user can find out the PRF's actions during the previous 24 hours.

=== Traffic accident bulletin ===
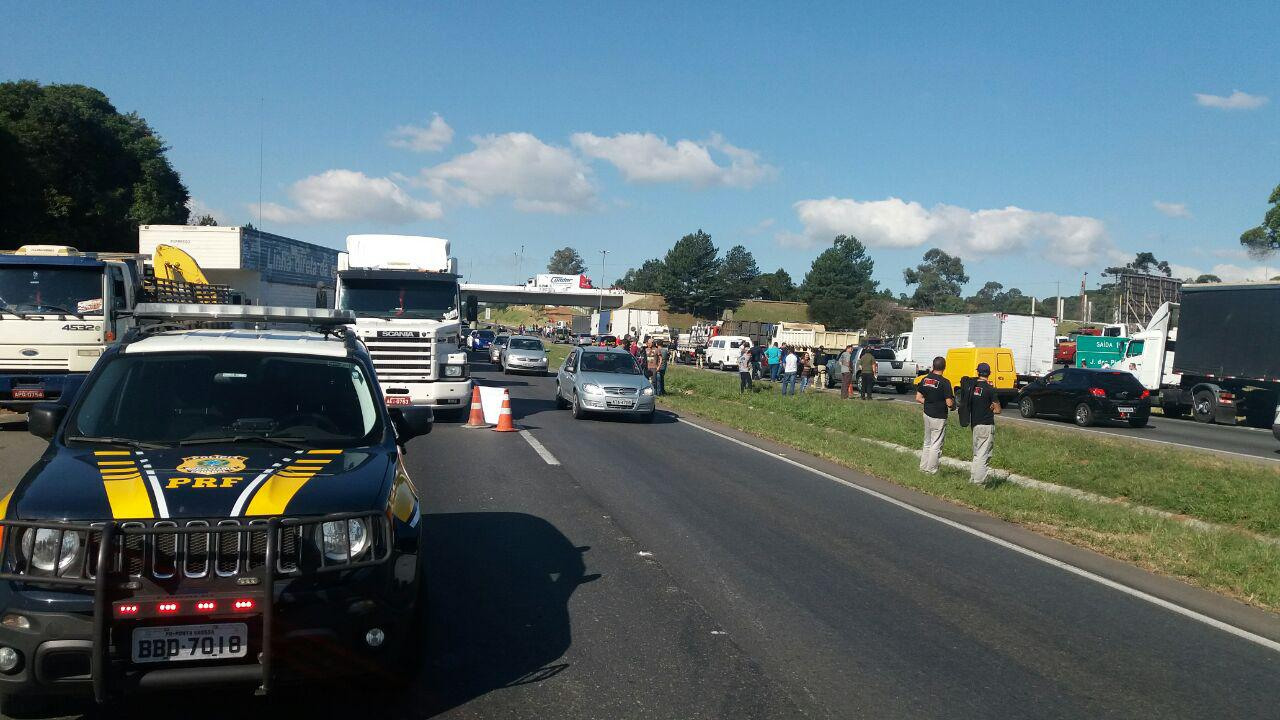
On duty

The PRF's traffic accident bulletin is provided through a system known as BAT (boletim de acidente de trânsito), through which the department makes accident reports from any state of Brazil available. It was originally known as BrBrasil.

Any federal highway police officer has access to an accident reported in this system, even if it was in another region.

This system allows accidents of national relevance to be investigated by the General Command in Brasília in real time. The information is available instantly not only to commanders but also to any PRF officer who wishes to consult it. It also benefits people reporting accidents, who can obtain the information without bureaucracy upon request at a PRF patrol post.

In addition to PRF officers, vehicle owners, insurance companies, drivers, and victims can view and print the BATs. Anyone involved in the accident can print the bulletin free of charge directly from the PRF's website.

== Armament ==
Model	Origin	Type
Taurus PT100 AF	Brazil	Semi-automatic pistol
Taurus PT 940	Brazil	Semi-automatic pistol
Glock 17	Austria	Semi-automatic pistol
Taurus SMT	Brazil	Submachine gun
Pump CBC 12	Brazil	Shotgun
IMBEL IA2	Brazil	Rifle
Para-Fal	Belgium	Rifle
Colt M16	United States	Rifle
Armalite M15	United States	Rifle

== Anti-crime operations ==
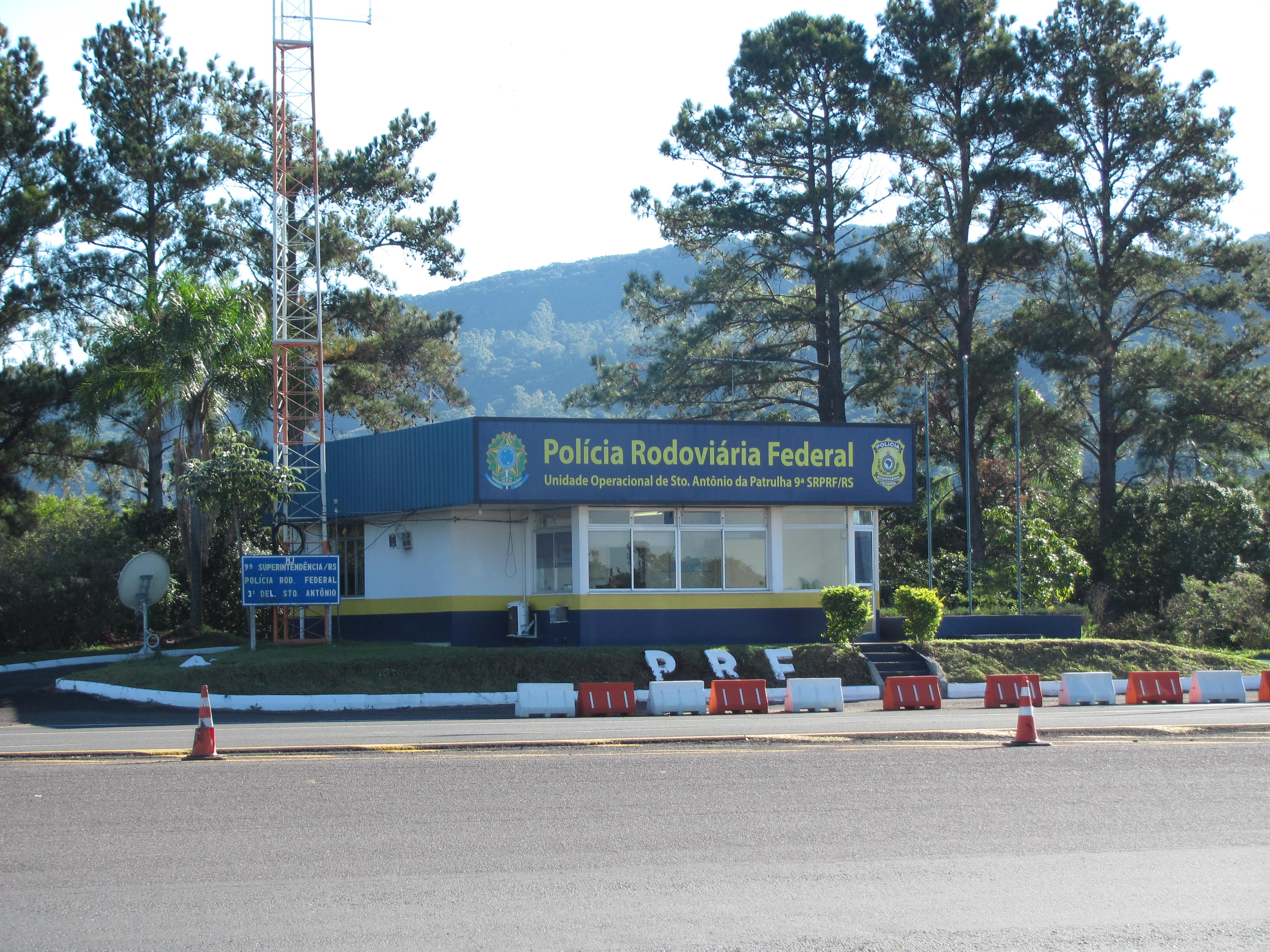
Polícia Rodoviária Federal post in Santo Antônio da Patrulha, Rio Grande do Sul.

As the road is the main method of transport for merchandise, valuables, and people in Brazil, the PRF carries out numerous anti-crime activities, often specific to the characteristics of each region. In border regions, emphasis is given to fighting contraband and drug trafficking (with the aid of police dogs); in the North Region the focus is on repressing environmental crimes, such as the extraction and transport of natural resources prohibited by law; and in the Northeast Region the PRF concentrates on fighting marijuana trafficking and trafficking of minors.

Throughout the country, the PRF searches for fugitives and wanted criminals who may be traveling on federal highways, recovers stolen vehicles, and conducts specific operations against the robbery of vehicles with valuable cargo and passenger buses.

The PRF no longer restricts itself to crimes on federal highways. A series of operations, some of which were carried out in conjunction with other federal agencies, has reinforced the agency's new position of acting as a federal police force: Operação Carta Branca (against fraud in the issuing of licenses), Operação Paracelso (against the fuel mafia), Operação Seringueira and Operação Velozes e Furiosos, among others. Hundreds of search and arrest warrants were carried out throughout the country.

== Emergency aid services ==
In some states, the Federal Highway Police has an agreement with the Mobile Emergency Assistance Service (Serviço de Atendimento Móvel de Urgência or SAMU) and provides some vehicles and aircraft to aid accident victims. Police officers trained in emergency services work in collaboration with doctors and nurses.

In other states, the PRF has an agreement with the Corpo de Bombeiros (firefighters) and provides aid services in conjunction with them.

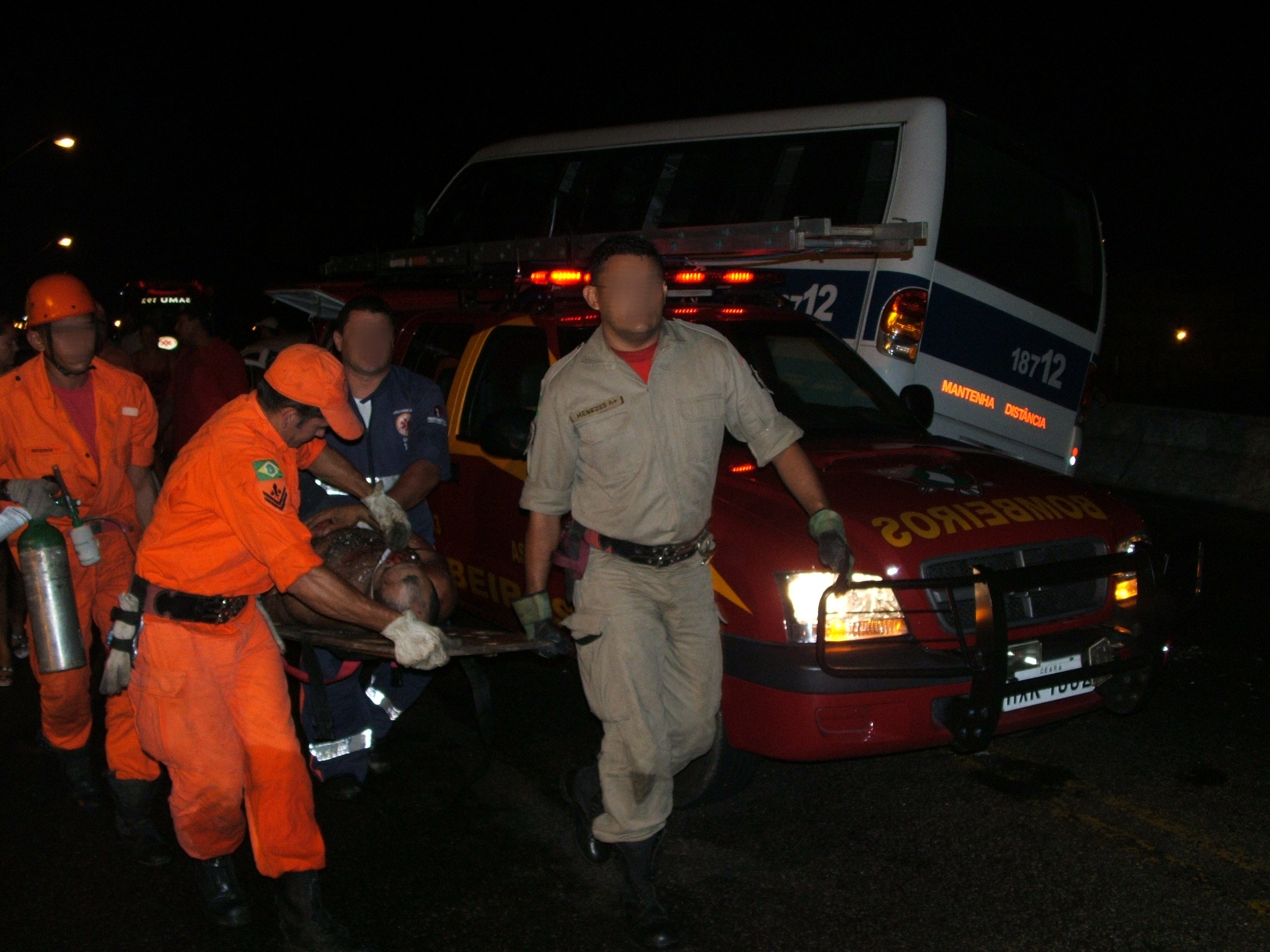
Victim being taken to the mobile ICU PRF

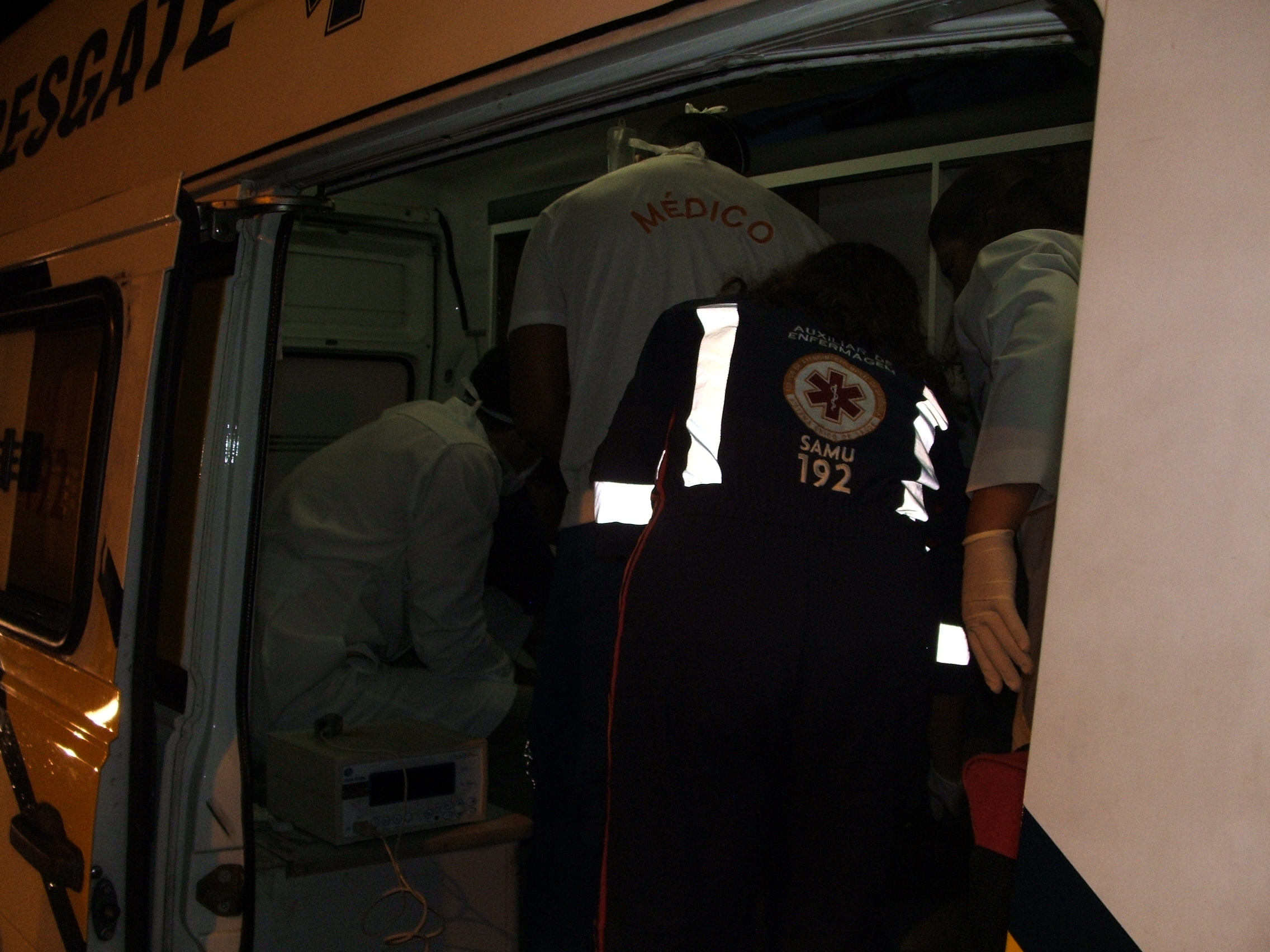
Attending physician in the mobile ICU victim of PRF.

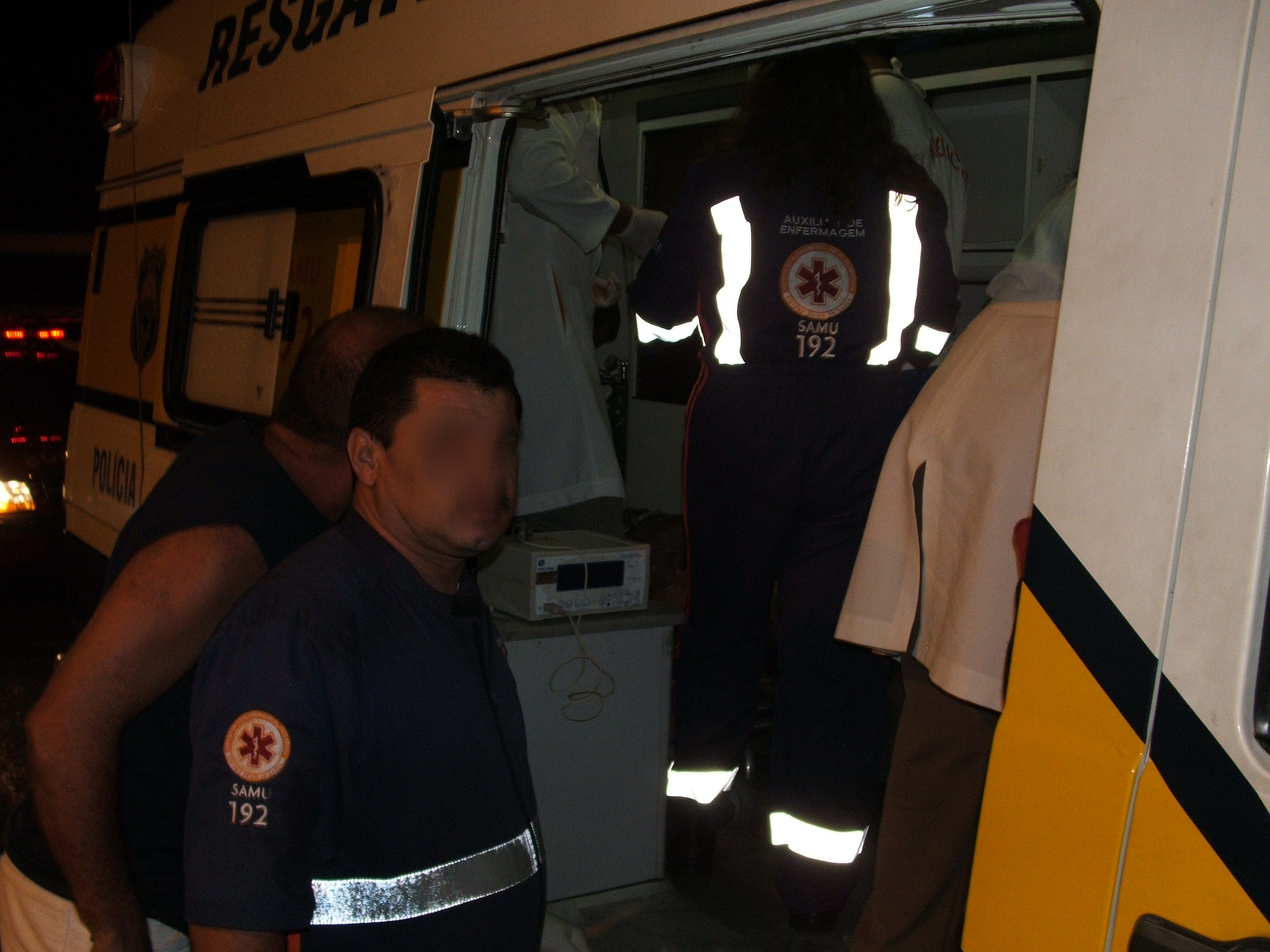
Rescue PRF - Doctor and nurses working with the police

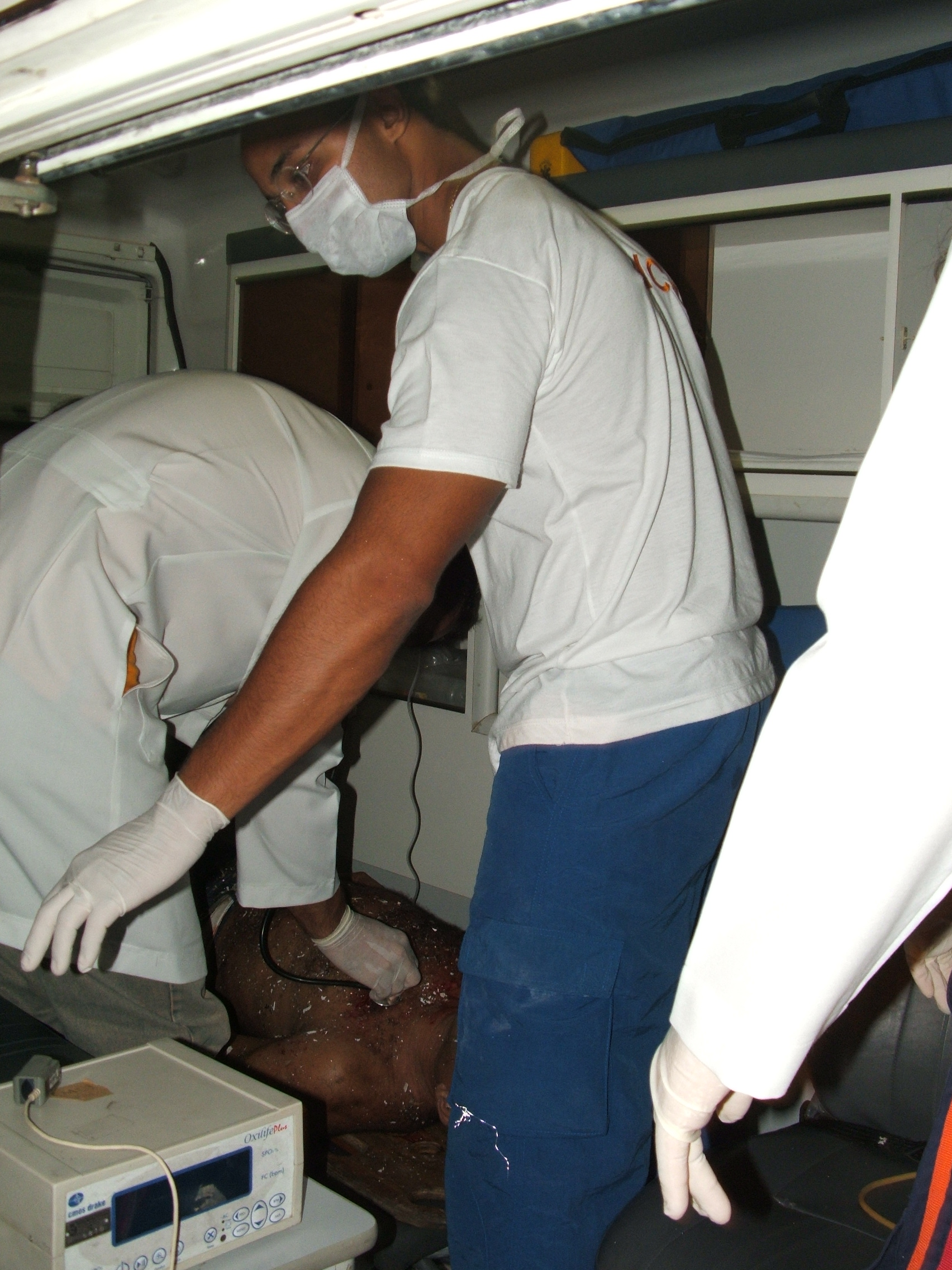
Rescue PRF - Doctor attending to victim of a traffic accident.

== Traffic patrol ==
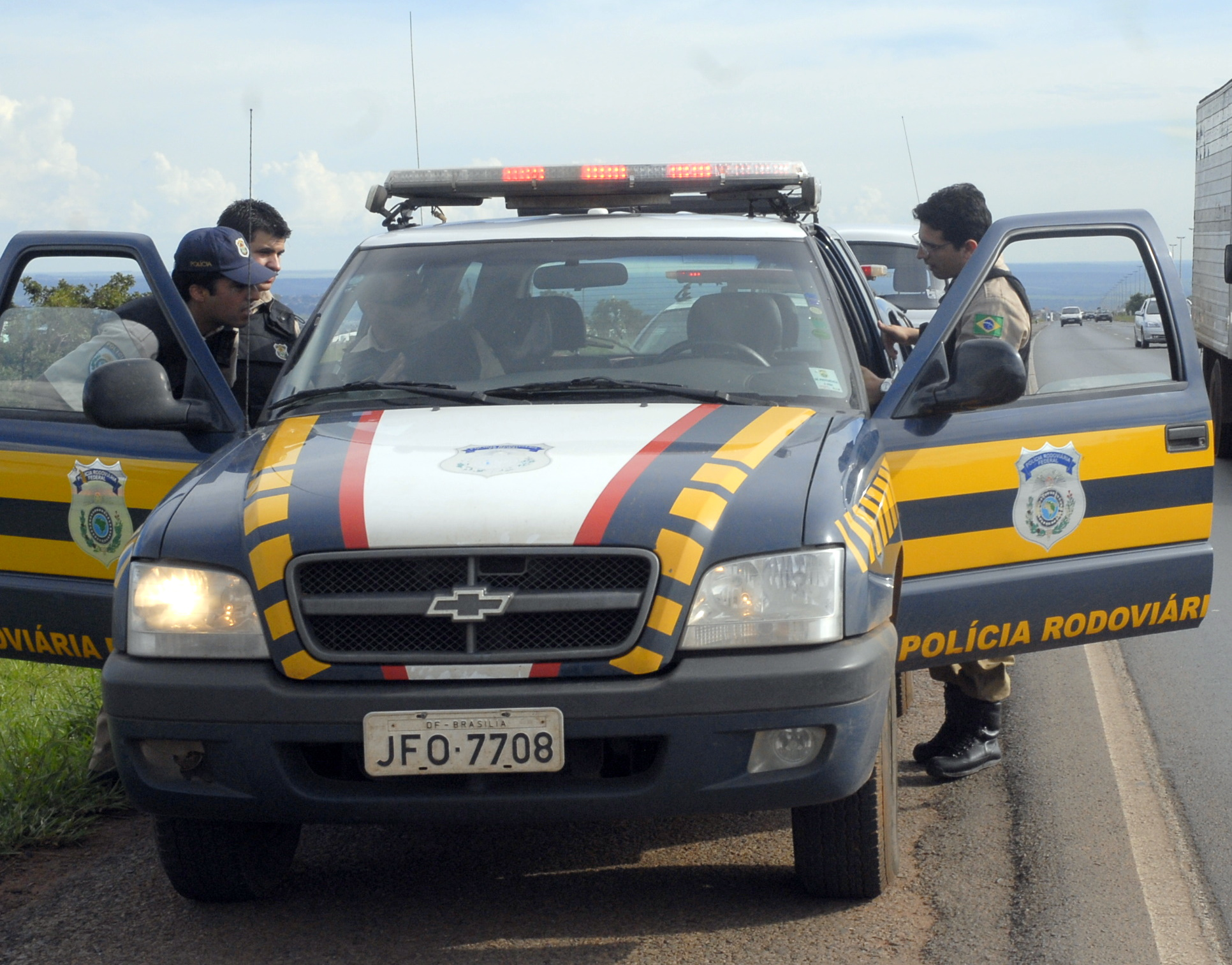
Federal Highway Police in 2008

The PRF has the exclusive function of applying the Brazilian Traffic Code (Law 9,503 of 1997) on federal highways. Traffic patrol is carried out in a simple and conventional manner by way of infraction notification forms and in more complex ways, using specialized equipment, such as speed radar, breathalyzers, and other measuring equipment such as scales. After the time periods mandated by law, the notifications generate punishments, in most cases in the form of fines.

The main objective of traffic patrol is the prevention of accidents and the preservation of national heritage.

Under Law 11,705 of 2008, the PRF is responsible for supervising commercial establishments along rural federal roads with the objective of restricting the sale of alcoholic beverages, in order to reduce the number of accidents occurring as a result of excessive consumption.

During the 2016 Summer Olympics, the PRF provided security and escort for the Olympic athletes during the cycling and cross-country track and field events of the Games.

== Airborne operations ==
The Federal Highway Police Department has an Airborne Operations Division (Divisão de Operações Aéreas or DOA), responsible for the airborne supervision of highways and aiding accident victims.

This division has bases in João Pessoa, Brasília, São Paulo, Pernambuco, Paraná, and Santa Catarina. Each base works with a helicopter, with the Pernambuco base also having an airplane, used for the identification of marijuana plantations. The helicopters are used mostly to aid accident victims, as some bases have agreements with the SAMU.

Every helicopter is staffed by a pilot, an operator and a first responder, all of whom are PRF officers. At bases having agreements with the SAMU, the first responder is replaced by a doctor and a nurse.

The PRF's pilot and operator training course includes technical instruction and rescue training in diverse situations, including on the high seas.

The operators receive combat training and licenses to operate XM-15 rifles, used by the division, in order to also act as tactical support for crime fighting operations.

Photo	Aircraft	Quantity
	Bell 407	6
	Bell 412	1
	Eurocopter EC120 Colibri	4
	Piper Seneca III	1
	Cessna C-208B Grand Caravan	1

== Land vehicles ==
Photo	Model	Function
	BMW 3 Series	Patrol car
	BMW R1200GS	Response motorcycle
	Chevrolet Camaro	Patrol car
	Chevrolet Cruze	Patrol car
	Chevrolet Equinox	Response car
	Chevrolet S-10	Response car
	Combat Armor Defense Turq	Brazilian-made APC with NIJ level III armor
	Dodge Challenger R/T	Made in 2010, seized in 2017 in an operation against drug cartels. Used as a training vehicle
	Ford Ranger XLT	XLT 3.2 Diesel 4x4 AT version featuring NIJ level III armor, loopholes and anti-IED protection. Designated as "Armored Tactical Operations Vehicle" (VBOT).
	Nissan Frontier	Multi-purpose car
	Jeep Grand Cherokee	Response car
	Mercedes-Benz E-Class	Response car
	Mercedes-Benz Sprinter	Patrol car
	Mitsubishi Triton	Response car
	Porsche Cayenne	Response car
	Range Rover Velar	Response car
	Renault Fluence	Patrol car
	Toyota Tundra	Multi-purpose car

== In popular media ==
The PRF appears in Fast Five, the fifth film of the Fast & Furious series, in which corrupt PRF officers on the payroll of drug lord Hernan Reyes are sent, alongside the PMERJ and Rio Civil Police, to retrieve his vault of drug money after it is stolen from a PMERJ station. The main PRF vehicles used in the film are the Volkswagen Jetta and the Ford Explorer.

The TV series O Vigilante Rodoviário (The Road Ranger) was about a patrolman and his dog, who patrolled the highways of Brazil on a 1952 Harley-Davidson motorcycle or in a Simca Chambord sedan, depending on the assignment. The show became part of Brazilian culture as the first action- adventure drama shot on film, and it also popularized the PRF.

== Controversies ==
During the second round of the 2022 Brazilian general election, the PRF made numerous vehicle stops in northeast Brazil, a region with a particularly high number of left-wing voters. At least 619 buses had been stopped by 17:00, when voting closed, a number 108% higher than the stops made in the first round four weeks earlier. It was alleged that this action was an attempt to prevent citizens from reaching their polling places, in support of then-president Jair Bolsonaro, a right-wing politician. Chief director Silvinei Vasques went to the Superior Electoral Court (STE) to testify regarding his administrative decisions. According to the then- president of the STE and minister of the Supreme Federal Court (STF), Alexandre de Morais, "There was no damage to the exercise of the right to vote and logically there will be no postponement of the end of voting time". The stops caused significant controversy on social media, amid high political polarization in Brazil.

== See also ==
- Federal Police of Brazil
- Military Police (Brazil)
- Law enforcement in Brazil
- Civil Police (Brazil)
- National Public Security Force
