= National Public Security Force =

Federal law enforcement agency in Brazil

National Public Security Force Força Nacional de Segurança Pública
- Abbreviation: FNSP

Agency overview
- Formed: 2004
- Employees: 6,000 - 10,000 officers (variable)

Jurisdictional structure
- Federal agency: Brazil
- Operations jurisdiction: Brazil
- General nature: Federal law enforcement; Gendarmerie

Operational structure
- Headquarters: Brasília, DF
- Parent agency: Ministry of Justice and Public Security

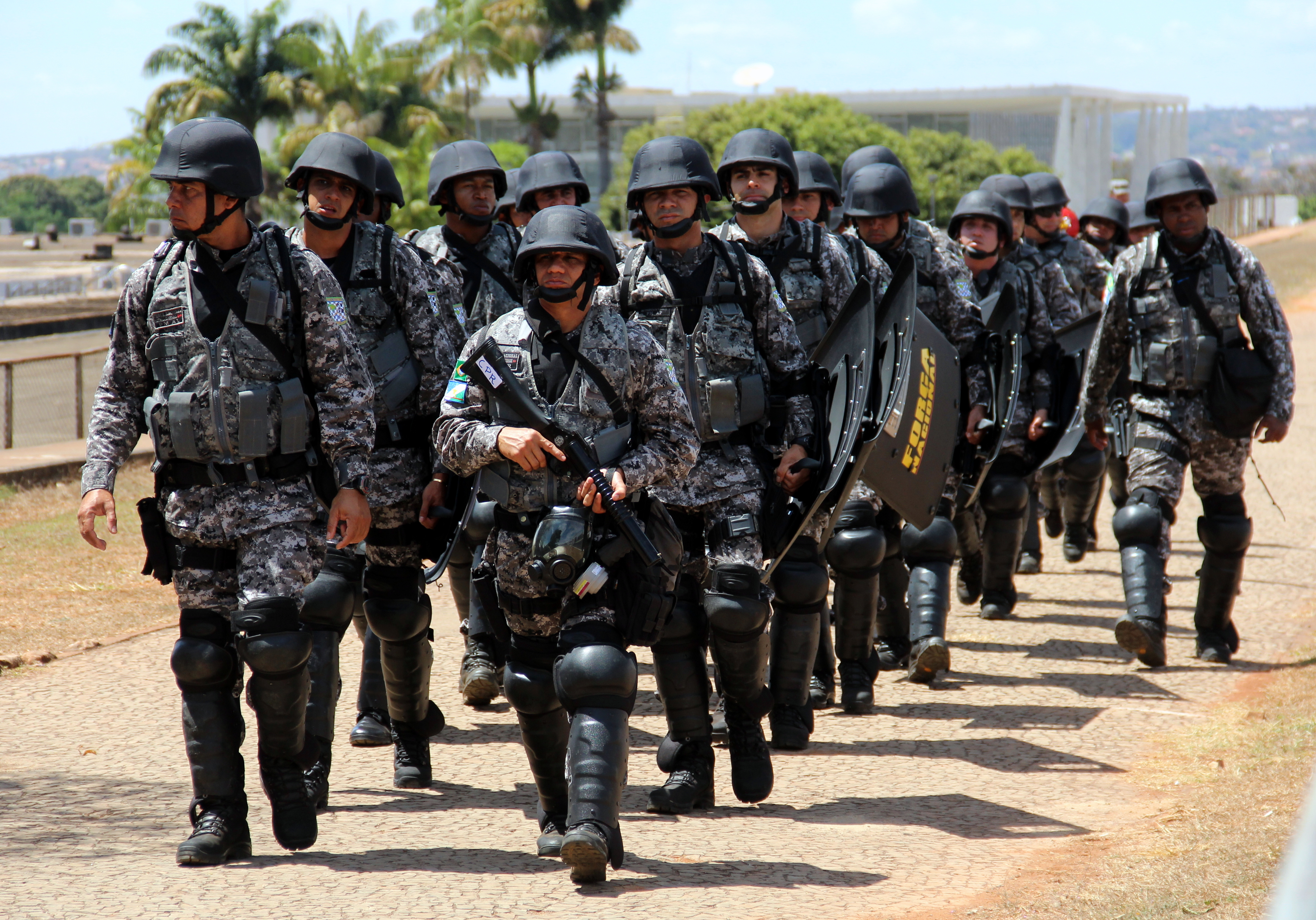
Agents of the National Public Security Force active.

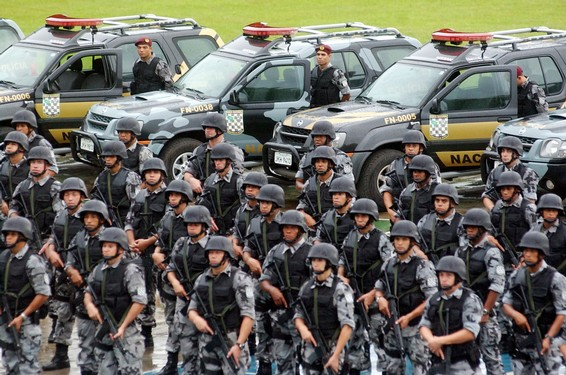
Officers and Nissan Xterra vehicles of the National Public Security Force.

The National Public Security Force (Portuguese: Força Nacional de Segurança Pública, FNSP), or National Force (Força Nacional) was created in 2004 and is headquartered in Brasília, in the Federal District, as a joint cooperation of various Brazilian Public Safety forces, co-ordinated by the National Secretariat of Public Security (Secretaria Nacional de Segurança Pública - SENASP), of the Ministry of Justice and Public Security. It was created during the administration of President Luiz Inácio Lula da Silva, as a concept developed by then Minister of Justice Márcio Thomaz Bastos.

The National Force is composed of the most qualified civil and military police personnel, military firefighters and experts loaned from each of the states of Brazil. It is deployed in cases of major security crisis to augment local security forces by the request of local authorities. It is similar in its regiment, action, and use to the USA's National Guard.

== Command ==
The Secretary of the SENASP, Police Commissioner of the Brazilian Federal Police, Luiz Fernando Correa, is in overall charge of the Force, while the Colonel of the Military Police of Acre, José Américo de Souza Gaia, has operational and direct control of the force.

== Training ==
The National Force is composed of men of the Brazilian Military Police of the various states of Brazil, in coordination with the Secretary of Public Security of each different Brazilian state. One of the FNSP's training units, the Rapid Deployment Training Battalion (Batalhão Escola de Pronto Emprego, Bepe) is based in Gama, Federal District. The school was built in four accommodation blocks and had the capacity to house up to 640 police officers, a school block with 10 classrooms, a cafeteria for 380 people and a laundry. The unit has an administrative block with an auditorium, meeting room and mini-museum on the history of the National Force. A large area is reserved for green area, to help protect the well-being of the staff, greater productivity and better organizational results.

Law enforcement officers receive initially 100 hours of further education, divided in ten days of training. There are classes in human rights, control of civil riots, ostensive policing, crisis management and shooting techniques.

== BEPE ==
The BEPE or Batalhão Especial de Pronto Emprego (Quick Deployment Special Battalion) is the elite unit of the National Public Security Force. It was established on September 30, 2008. It is headquartered in Gama, in the Federal District. Its training with elite units of Brazil, such as the Special Police Operations Battalion (BOPE) from Alagoas Military Police, and foreign special operations units allows BEPE to be effectively suited for patrol or police special operations anywhere in the country. The BEPE was established by the Ministry of Justice as the leading and best-trained unit within the Brazilian police to act in emergency situations concerning public safety when the state law enforcement agencies request federal intervention.

== Operations ==
On different occasions, the National Force was called in the state of Espírito Santo as well as in the state of Mato Grosso do Sul, primarily to help contain prison riots. On another occasion, the federal government offered to send the National Force to assist the state of São Paulo against acts of violence organized there, in 2006, again by prisoners against the state public safety forces, but the federal government offer was refused by the state government, as the state claimed control over the prisoners.

The governor of the state of Rio de Janeiro, Sérgio Cabral Filho asked for support from the National Public Security Force back in 2007 when the state suffered from a wave of attacks by several criminal factions. The Federal Government agreed to send a contingent of about 500 men and 52 vehicles to patrol 19 critical points within the state, primarily within the favelas. In June of 2013, National Public Security Force was deployed in Rio de Janeiro, Belo Horizonte, Salvador, Fortaleza, and Brasilia, who were all hosting FIFA's Confederations Cup, in response to conflicts between riot police and protesters during protests in Sao Paulo. The only city to not request for assistance from the National Public Security Force was Recife.

The FNSP was called into action in the states of Santa Catarina, Minas Gerais and Bahia in 2013, and in Pernambuco in 2014. In these cases, the force provided strict security measures in these states. It reinforced local police work in Teresina, Piaui, in 2015. In 2016, aside from security duties at the 2016 Rio Summer Olympics and the city elections there, detachments of the force were deployed to Rio Grande do Sul and Maranhão, and in the fall of 2017 in Espírito Santo.

In January 2023, National Public Security Force were deployed in Brasília, on the esplanade leads to Brazil’s National Congress Palace, Supreme Federal Court Palace, and Palácio do Planalto, to protect the government after an attempted coup following the 2022 Brazilian general election. In September of 2024, National Public Security Force was mobilized to help combat wildfires located near the Bolivian border. 37 military firefighters, including 25 personnel from the Federal District Military Fire Brigade (Abbreviated in Portuguese as CBMDF), were active in the providing assistance in combating the fires until September 17, 2024.

== Vehicles ==
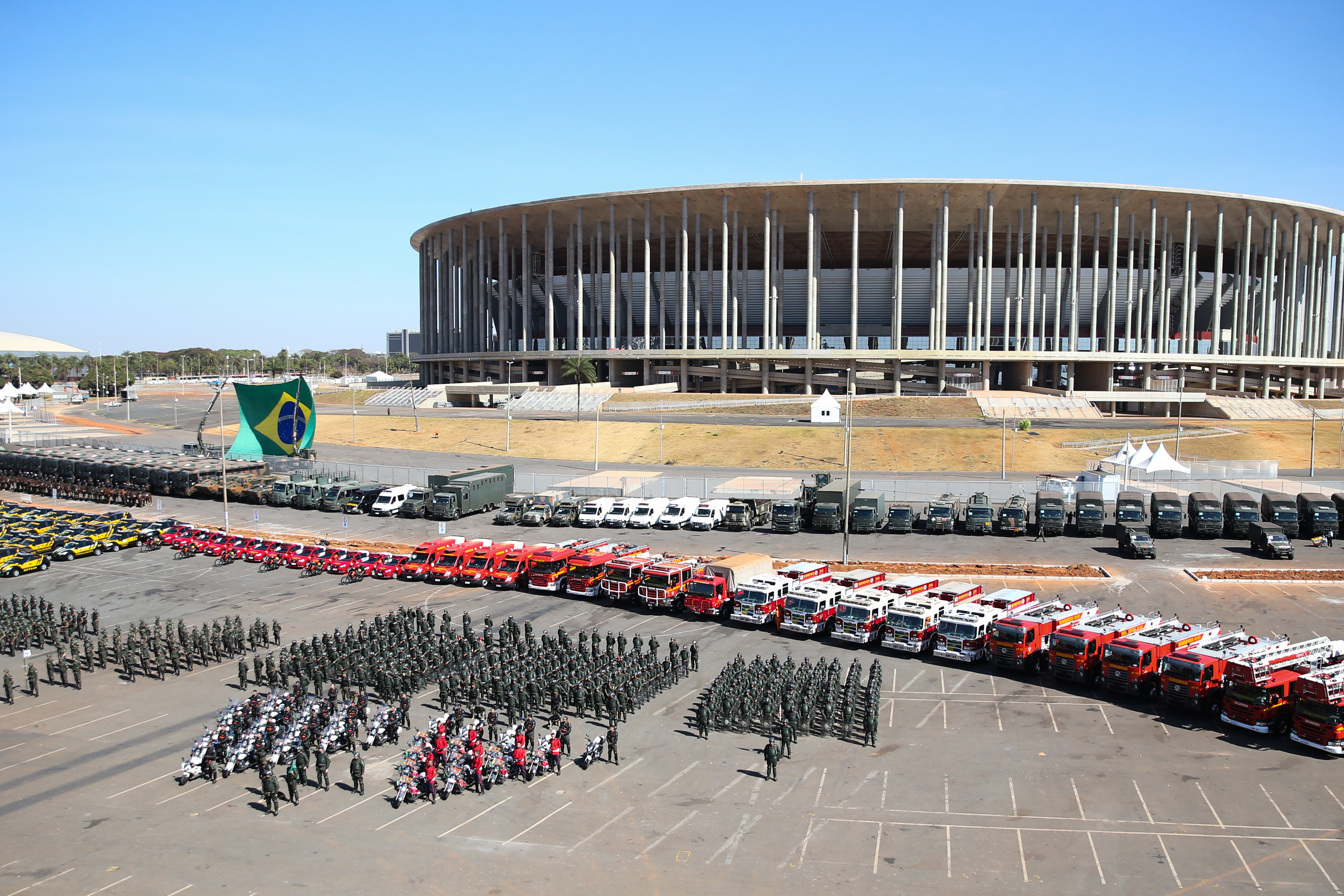
NPSF in Brasília in 2016.

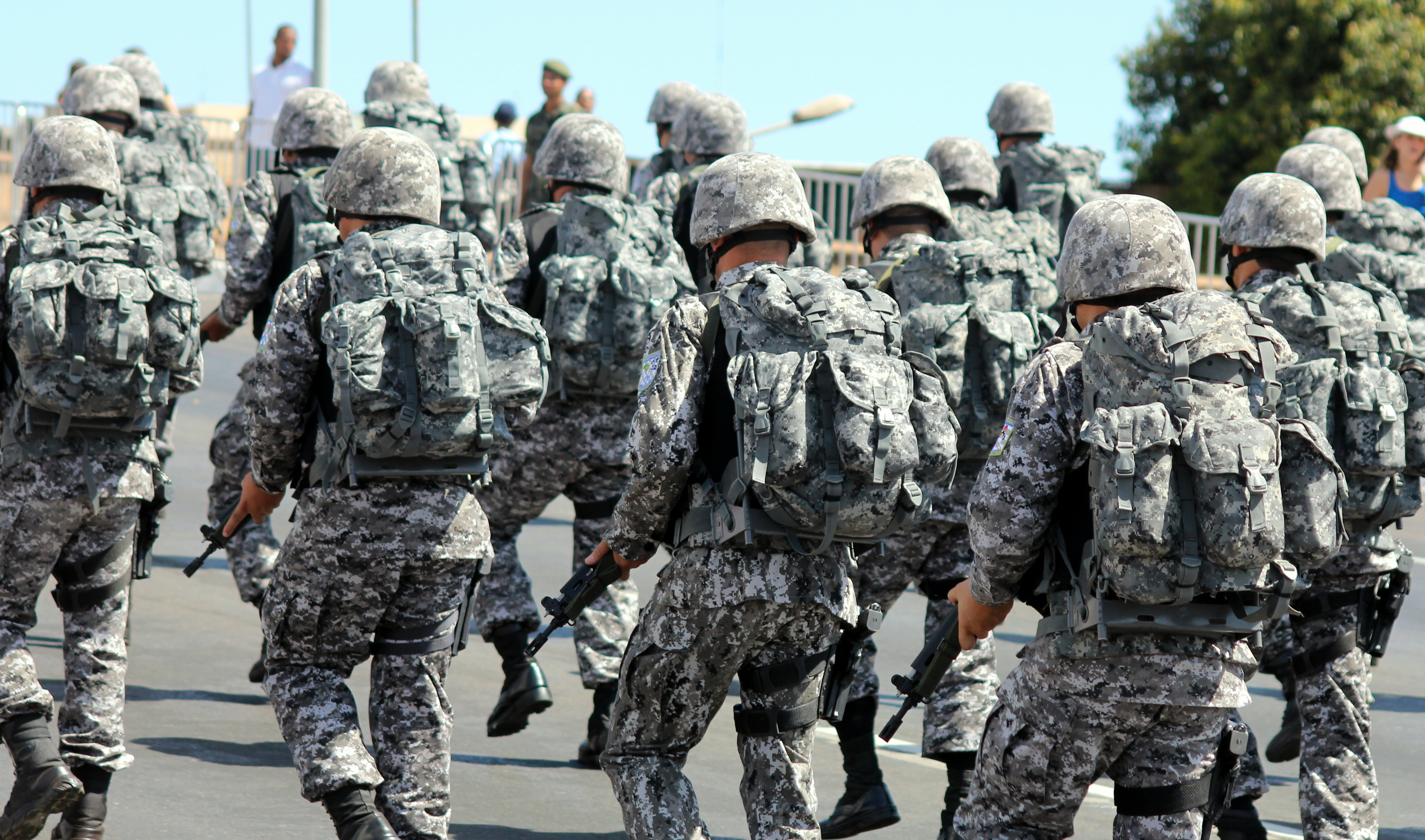
National Public Security Force officers in urban combat uniforms.

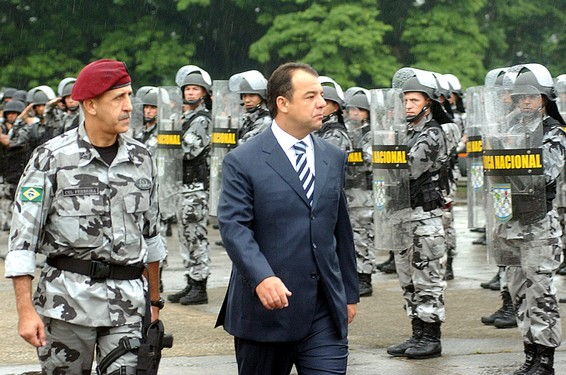
FNSP in Rio de Janeiro - 2007.

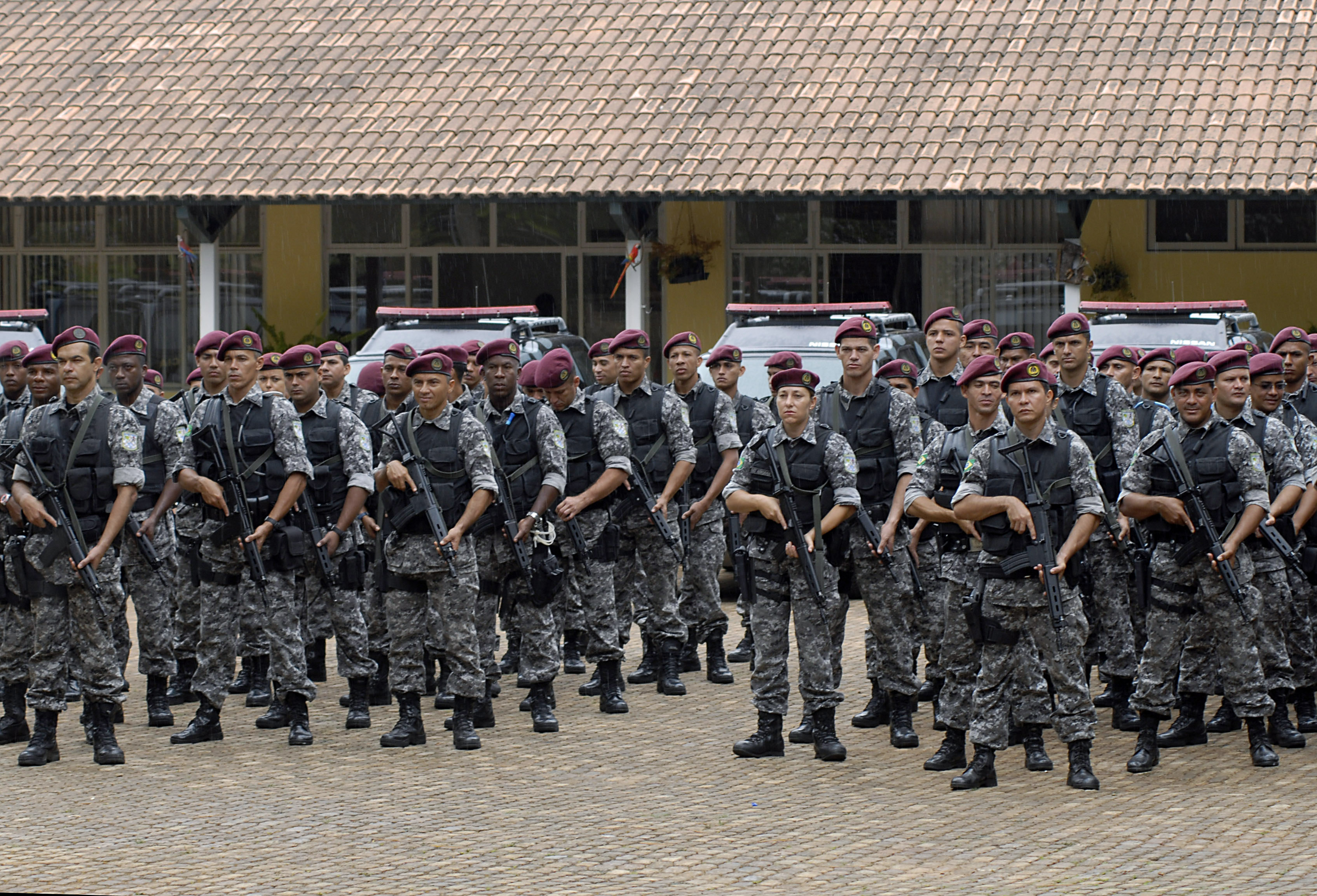
Agents of the National Public Security Force in 2012.

Model	Manufacturer	Notes	Photo
Nissan Xterra	Nissan	Patrol car	
Nissan Frontier	Nissan	Patrol car	
Mitsubishi L200	Mitsubishi	Patrol car	
Fiat Ducato	Fiat	Utilitary	
Mercedes-Benz Sprinter	Mercedes-Benz	Utilitary	
Comil Campione	Volvo/Comil	Bus	
Volare w7	Marcopolo S.A.	Bus	
VBL Gladiador	Inbrafiltro	Armoured car	

== Weapons ==
Model	Origin	Type	Reference
Taurus PT 24/7	Brazil	Semi-automatic pistol	
Taurus PT100	Brazil	Semi-automatic pistol	
Beretta APX	Italy	Semi-automatic pistol	
Pump CBC 12	Brazil	Shotgun	
IMBEL MD97	Brazil	Assault rifle	
IMBEL IA2	Brazil	Assault rifle	

== See also ==
- Law enforcement in Brazil
- Military Police (Brazil)
- Brazilian Armed Forces
- Civil Police (Brazil)
- Batalhão de Operações Policiais Especiais
- Complexo do Alemão massacre
