= List of federal institutions of Brazil =

This is a list of the federal institutions of Brazil:

== Legislative branch ==
- National Congress, Congresso Nacional

- Chamber of Deputies, Câmara dos Deputados
- Senate of Brazil, Senado Federal

- Court of Audit of the Union, Tribunal de Contas da União (TCU)

== Executive branch ==
- Cabinet of Brazil, Gabinete Ministerial

=== Presidency of Brazil, Presidência da República ===
- National Defense Council, Conselho de Defesa Nacional (CDN)
- Cabinet of Institutional Security, Gabinete de Segurança Institucional (GSI)
- Chief of Staff, Casa Civil da Presidência da República
- National Antidrugs Secretariat, Secretaria Nacional Antidrogas (SENAD)
- Special Secretariat for Human Rights, Secretaria Especial dos Direitos Humanos (SEDH)
- General-Secretariat of the Presidency, Secretaria-Geral da Presidência (SG)
- Attorney General of the Union, Advocacia-Geral da União (AGU)
- Press Secretary, Secretaria de Comunicação Social (SeCom)
  - Spokesman of the Presidency, Porta-Voz da Presidência
- Strategic Affairs Unit, Núcleo de Assuntos Estratégicos (NAE)

=== Ministry of Agrarian Development, Ministério do Desenvolvimento Agrário ===
- Instituto Nacional de Colonização e Reforma Agrária (INCRA)

=== Ministry of Agriculture, Livestock and Supply, Ministério da Agricultura, Pecuária e Abastecimento ===
- Secretaria de Produção e Comercialização (SPC)
- Secretaria de Defesa Agropecuária (SDA)
- National Institute of Meteorology, Instituto Nacional de Meteorologia (INMET)

=== Ministry of Communications, Ministério das Comunicações (MC) ===
- Brazilian Agency of Telecommunications, Agência Nacional de Telecomunicações (ANATEL)
- Brazilian Post and Telegraph Corporation, Empresa Brasileira de Correios e Telégrafos (ECT)

=== Ministry of Culture, Ministério da Cultura (MinC) ===
- Institute of National Historical and Artistic Heritage, Instituto do Patrimônio Histórico e Artístico Nacional (IPHAN)
- National Film Agency, Agência Nacional do Cinema (Ancine)
- House of Rui Barbosa Foundation, Fundação Casa de Rui Barbosa (FCRB)
- Palmares Cultural Foundation, Fundação Cultural Palmares (FCP)
- National Foundation of Arts, Fundação Nacional de Artes (Funarte)
- National Library Foundation, Fundação Biblioteca Nacional (FBN)
- National Museum of Brazil, Museu Nacional

=== Ministry of Defense, Ministério da Defesa (MD) ===
- Brazilian Army, Exército Brasileiro (EB)
- Brazilian Air Force, Força Aérea Brasileira (FAB)

- Aeronautical Accidents Investigation and Prevention Center, Centro de Investigação e Prevenção de Acidentes Aeronáuticos (CENIPA)

- Brazilian Navy, Marinha do Brasil (MB)

Linked entities

- Brazilian Airport Infrastructure Company, Empresa Brasileira de Infraestrutura Aeroportuária (Infraero)
- Higher War School, Escola Superior de Guerra (ESG)
- Armed Forces Hospital, Hospital das Forças Armadas (HFA)
- National Civil Aviation Agency, Agência Nacional de Aviação Civil

=== Ministry of Development, Industry and Foreign Trade, Ministério do Desenvolvimento, Indústria e Comércio Exterior (MDIC) ===
- National Institute of Metrology, Standardization and Industrial Quality (Brazil) Instituto Nacional de Metrologia, Normalização e Qualidade Industrial, (INMETRO)
- National Institute of Industrial Property Instituto Nacional da Propriedade Industrial (INPI)
- National Bank for Economic and Social Development Banco Nacional de Desenvolvimento Econômico e Social (BNDES)

=== Ministry of Education, Ministério da Educação (MEC) ===
- National Institute of Educational Studies and Researches, Instituto Nacional de Estudos e Pesquisas Educacionais (INEP)
- National Council of Education, Conselho Nacional da Educação
- Joaquim Nabuco Foundation, Fundação Joaquim Nabuco
- Federal Institutes of Education, Science and Technology, Institutos Federais de Educação, Ciência e Tecnologia (IFs)
- Federal Centers of Technological Education, Centros Federais de Educação Tecnológica (CEFETs)
- Federal universities

=== Ministry of the Environment, Ministério do Meio Ambiente (MMA) ===
Councils and commissions

- Conselho Nacional do Meio Ambiente (CONAMA)
- Conselho Nacional da Amazônia Legal (CONAMAZ)
- Conselho Nacional de Recursos Hídricos
- Conselho Deliberativo do Fundo Nacional do Meio Ambiente
- Conselho de Gestão do Patrimônio Genético
- Comissão de Gestão de Florestas Públicas
- Comissão Nacional de Florestas (CONAFLOR)
- Serviço Florestal Brasileiro (SFB)

Linked entities

- Agência Nacional de Águas (ANA)
- Brazilian Institute of Environment and Renewable Natural Resources, Instituto Brasileiro do Meio Ambiente e dos Recursos Naturais Renováveis (IBAMA)
- Instituto Chico Mendes de Conservação da Biodiversidade
- Instituto de Pesquisas Jardim Botânico do Rio de Janeiro (JBRJ)
- Companhia de Desenvolvimento de Barcarena (CODEBAR)

=== Ministry of Foreign Affairs, Ministério das Relações Exteriores (MRE/Itamaraty) ===
- Rio Branco Institute, Instituto Rio Branco (IRBr)
- Alexandre de Gusmão Foundation, Fundação Alexandre de Gusmão (FUNAG)

=== Ministry of Economy, Ministério da Economia ===
Secretariats

- Secretaria-Executiva

- Subsecretaria de Planejamento Orçamento e Administração

- Secretaria de Acompanhamento Econômico (SEAE)
- Secretaria de Assuntos Internacionais
- Secretaria de Política Econômica
- Secretariat of Federal Revenue of Brazil, Secretaria da Receita Federal do Brasil
- Secretariat of National Treasury, Secretaria do Tesouro Nacional

Collegiate Organs

- Conselho Monetário Nacional
- Conselho Nacional de Política Fazendária
- Conselho de Recursos do Sistema Financeiro Nacional
- Conselho Nacional de Seguros Privados
- Conselho de Recursos do Sistema Nacional de Seguros Privados, de Previdência Privada Aberta e de Capitalização
- Council for Financial Activities Control, Conselho de Controle de Atividades Financeiras (COAF)
- Câmara Superior de Recursos Fiscais
- Conselhos de Contribuintes
- Comitê Brasileiro de Nomenclatura
- Comitê de Avaliação de Créditos ao Exterior
- Comitê de Coordenação Gerencial das Instituições Financeiras Públicas Federais

Linked entities

- Autarchies:

- Central Bank of Brazil, Banco Central do Brasil
- Comissão de Valores Mobiliários
- Superintendência de Seguros Privados

- Public companies:

- Casa da Moeda do Brasil
- Serviço Federal de Processamento de Dados
- Caixa Econômica Federal
- Empresa Gestora de Ativos

- Mixed economy companies:

- Banco do Brasil
- Brasil Resseguros
- Banco da Amazônia
- Banco do Nordeste do Brasil
- Banco do Estado do Piaui
- Banco do Estado de Santa Catarina
- BESC Crédito Imobiliário (BESCRI)

=== Ministry of Justice, Ministério da Justiça (MJ) ===
- State Secretariat for Human Rights, Secretaria de Estado dos Direitos Humanos (SEDH)
- National Secretariat of Justice, Secretaria Nacional de Justiça
- National Prison Department, Departamento Penitenciário Nacional (DEPEN)
- Department of Foreigners, Departamento de Estrangeiros (DEEST)
- National Secretariat of Public Security, Secretaria Nacional de Segurança Pública (SENASP)
- Secretariat for Economic Rights, Secretaria de Direito Econômico (SDE)
- Department of Consumer Protection and Defence, Departamento de Proteção e Defesa do Consumidor (DPDC)
- Department of Economic Protection and Defence, Departamento de Proteção e Defesa Econômico (DPDE)
- Secretariat for Legislative Affairs, Secretaria de Assuntos Legislativos (SAL)
- Federal Police Department, Departamento de Polícia Federal (DPF)
- Department of the Federal Highway Police, Departamento de Polícia Rodoviária Federal (DPRF)
- Departamento Nacional de Trânsito (DENATRAN)

=== Ministry of Labor and Employment, Ministério do Trabalho e Emprego ===
- Board of Trustees of the Guarantee Fund Service Time, Conselho Curador do Fundo de Garantia do Tempo de Serviço
- Advisory Board of the Fund for Workers, Conselho Deliberativo do Fundo de Amparo ao Trabalhador
- National Council for Solidarity Economy, Conselho Nacional de Economia Solidária
- National Immigration Council, Conselho Nacional de Imigração
- National Labour Council, Conselho Nacional do Trabalho
- Legal Advice, Consultoria Jurídica
- Jorge Duprat Figueiredo Foundation, Safety and Occupational Health, Fundação Jorge Duprat Figueiredo, de Segurança e Medicina do Trabalho
- Office of the Minister, Gabinete do Ministro
- Ombudsman General, Ouvidoria-Geral
- Bureau of Labor Inspection, Secretaria de Inspeção do Trabalho
- Department of Public Employment Policies, Secretaria de Políticas Públicas de Emprego
- Bureau of Labor Relations, Secretaria de Relações do Trabalho
- National Secretariat for Solidarity Economy, Secretaria Nacional de Economia Solidária
- Executive Secretary, Secretaria-Executiva
- Regional superintendencies:
  - Alagoas
  - Goiás
  - Mato Grosso
  - Mato Grosso do Sul
  - Minas Gerais
  - Pernambuco
  - Rondônia
  - Roraima
  - Santa Catarina
  - São Paulo
  - Sergipe
  - Tocantins
  - Bahia
  - Paraíba
  - Acre
  - Amapá
  - Amazonas
  - Ceará
  - Distrito Federal
  - Espírito Santo
  - Maranhão
  - Pará
  - Paraná
  - Piauí
  - Rio de Janeiro
  - Rio Grande do Norte

=== Ministry of National Integration, Ministério da Integração Nacional ===
- Departamento Nacional de Obras Contra as Secas (DNOCS)

=== Ministry of Planning, Budget and Management, Ministério do Planejamento, Orçamento e Gestão ===
- Brazilian Institute of Geography and Statistics, Instituto Brasileiro de Geografia e Estatística (IBGE)
- Institute of Applied Economic Research, Instituto de Pesquisa Econômica Aplicada (IPEA)

=== Ministry of Science and Technology, Ministério da Ciência e Tecnologia (MCT) ===
- Brazilian Space Agency, Agência Espacial Brasileira (AEB)
- National Institute for Space Research, Instituto Nacional de Pesquisas Espaciais (INPE)
- National Nuclear Energy Commission, Comissão Nacional de Energia Nuclear (CNEN)
- National Institute of Amazonian Research, Instituto Nacional de Pesquisas da Amazônia (INPA)
- National Institute of Technology, Instituto Nacional de Tecnologia (INT)
- National Council of Scientific and Technological Development, Conselho Nacional de Desenvolvimento Científico e Tecnológico (CNPq)
- Brazilian Institute of Information in Science and Technology, Instituto Brasileiro de Informação em Ciência e Tecnologia (IBICT)
- Institute for Pure and Applied Mathematics, Instituto Nacional de Matemática Pura e Aplicada (IMPA)
- Brazilian Centre of Physics Research, Centro Brasileiro de Pesquisas Físicas (CBPF)
- Centre of Mineral Technology Centro de Tecnologia Mineral (CETEM)
- National Laboratory of Astrophysics, Laboratório Nacional de Astrofísica (LNA)
- National Laboratory of Scientific Computing, Laboratório Nacional de Computação Científica (LNCC)
- National Laboratory of Light Synchrotron, Laboratório Nacional de Luz Síncrotron (LNLS)
- National Technical Commission of Biosecurity, Comissão Técnica Nacional de Biossegurança (CTNBio)
- Renato Archer Research Center, Centro de Pesquisas Renato Archer (CPRA)

=== Ministry of Social Welfare and Security, Ministério de Previdência e Assistência Social (MPAS) ===
- National Institute of Social Security, Instituto Nacional do Seguro Social (INSS)

=== Ministry of Sports, Ministério do Esporte ===
- National Institute of Sport Development, Instituto Nacional de Desenvolvimento do Desporto

=== Ministry of Tourism, Ministério do Turismo ===
- Brazilian Tourism Agency, Empresa Brasileira de Turismo (Embratur)

=== Ministry of Transportation, Ministério dos Transportes ===
- Departamento Nacional de Infraestrutura de Transporte (DNIT)

== Judicial branch ==
=== Administrative organs ===
- National Justice Council
- Federal Council of Justice Conselho da Justiça Federal (CJF)

=== Supreme Court ===
- Supreme Federal Court, Supremo Tribunal Federal (STF)

=== Superior courts ===
- Superior Court of Labor, Tribunal Superior do Trabalho (TST)
- Superior Military Court, Superior Tribunal Militar (STM)
- Superior Electoral Court Tribunal Superior Eleitoral (TSE)
- Superior Court of Justice, Superior Tribunal de Justiça (STJ)

=== Second instance Courts ===
- Regional Labor Courts
- Regional Electoral Courts
- Regional Federal Courts
- Regional Military Courts
- Regional State Courts

=== First instance courts ===
- Labor Courts
- Electoral Courts
- Federal Courts
- Military Courts
- Municipal Courts

=== Other court ===
- Court of Justice of the Federal District and the Territories Tribunal de Justiça do Distrito Federal e dos Territórios (TJDFT)

== Public Ministry of the Union ==
- Federal Prosecution Service, Ministério Público Federal (MPF)
- Labor Public Ministry, Ministério Público do Trabalho (MPT)
- Military Public Ministry, Ministério Público Militar (MPM)

== See also ==
- List of Brazilian government enterprises
- List of regulatory organs of Brazil
- Brazilian Public Service
