= Regional Electoral Courts =

Regional Electoral Court (Portuguese: Tribunal Regional Eleitoral, TRE) is the judicial body that is in charge of elections at the state level in Brazil. There are 27 TREs, one for each Brazilian state, plus one for the Federal District.

== Responsibilities ==
The operation of the regional electoral courts is governed by law 4.737 of 1965. Each court consists of judges that are publicly elected or nominated by part of the judiciary, according to rules set independently by each regional court.

According to law, the regional courts are responsible for control and inspection of the whole electoral process in their jurisdiction, from the registration of regional branches of political parties, to the production of reports and electoral maps during vote counting.

The regional courts are responsible for voter registration, for the makeup of electoral districts and for reporting the results. The regional courts also settle disputes regarding elections and handle appeals of the decisions of the electoral judges.

Each regional court has the freedom to make their own rules with regard to how these things are handled.

== List of regional electoral courts ==
- Regional Electoral Court of Acre, Tribunal Regional Eleitoral do Acre (TRE-AC)
- Regional Electoral Court of Alagoas, Tribunal Regional Eleitoral de Alagoas (TRE-AL)
- Regional Electoral Court of Amazonas, Tribunal Regional Eleitoral do Amazonas (TRE-AM)
- Regional Electoral Court of Amapá, Tribunal Regional Eleitoral do Amapá (TRE-AP)
- Regional Electoral Court of Bahia, Tribunal Regional Eleitoral da Bahia (TRE-BA)
- Regional Electoral Court of Ceará, Tribunal Regional Eleitoral do Acre (TRE-CE)
- Regional Electoral Court of the Federal District, Tribunal Regional Eleitoral do Distrito Federal (TRE-DF)
- Regional Electoral Court of Espírito Santo, Tribunal Regional Eleitoral do Espírito Santo (TRE-ES)
- Regional Electoral Court of Goiás, Tribunal Regional Eleitoral de Goiás (TRE-GO)
- Regional Electoral Court of Maranhão, Tribunal Regional Eleitoral do Maranhão (TRE-MA)
- Regional Electoral Court of Mato Grosso, Tribunal Regional Eleitoral do Mato Grosso (TRE-MG)
- Regional Electoral Court of Mato Grosso do Sul, Tribunal Regional Eleitoral do Mato Grosso do Sul (TRE-MS)
- Regional Electoral Court of Minas Gerais, Tribunal Regional Eleitoral de Minas Gerais (TRE-MG)
- Regional Electoral Court of Pará, Tribunal Regional Eleitoral do Pará (TRE-PA)
- Regional Electoral Court of Paraíba, Tribunal Regional Eleitoral da Paraíba (TRE-PB)
- Regional Electoral Court of Paraná, Tribunal Regional Eleitoral do Paraná (TRE-PR)
- Regional Electoral Court of Pernambuco, Tribunal Regional Eleitoral de Pernambuco (TRE-PE)
- Regional Electoral Court of Piauí, Tribunal Regional Eleitoral do Piauí (TRE-PI)
- Regional Electoral Court of Rio de Janeiro, Tribunal Regional Eleitoral do Rio de Janeiro (TRE-RJ)
- Regional Electoral Court of Rio Grande do Norte, Tribunal Regional Eleitoral do Rio Grande do Norte (TRE-RN)
- Regional Electoral Court of Rio Grande do Sul, Tribunal Regional Eleitoral do Rio Grande do Sul (TRE-RS)
- Regional Electoral Court of Rondônia, Tribunal Regional Eleitoral de Rondônia (TRE-RO)
- Regional Electoral Court of Roraima, Tribunal Regional Eleitoral de Roraima (TRE-RR)
- Regional Electoral Court of Santa Catarina, Tribunal Regional Eleitoral de Santa Catarina (TRE-SC)
- Regional Electoral Court of São Paulo, Tribunal Regional Eleitoral de São Paulo (TRE-SP)
- Regional Electoral Court of Sergipe, Tribunal Regional Eleitoral do Sergipe (TRE-SE)
- Regional Electoral Court of Tocantins, Tribunal Regional Eleitoral de Tocantins (TRE-TO)

== In relation to other courts ==
The 92 courts of the Brazilian judiciary
	State		Federal	
Superior courts		0	Supreme Federal Court; STF	1
Superior courts		0	Federal superior courts STJ TSE TST STM	4
Common justice	Court of Justice; TJ	27	Federal Regional Courts; TRF1 .. TRF6	6
Specialized justice	Court of Military Justice	3	Electoral Justice Courts; TRE	27
Specialized justice	TJM	3	Regional Labor Courts; TRT	24
Total		30		62

== Works cited ==
- Superior Electoral Court (22 June 2023). "Código Eleitoral - Lei nº 4.737, de 15 de julho de 1965". TSE.
