= Federal courts of Brazil =

The federal court system of Brazil has all its organs and competences listed and defined in the Brazilian 1988 Constitution. The National Justice Council is an exclusively administrative organ of the federal court system.

== Courts ==
The 92 courts of the Brazilian judiciary
	State		Federal	
Superior courts		0	Supreme Federal Court; STF	1
Superior courts		0	Federal superior courts STJ TSE TST STM	4
Common justice	Court of Justice; TJ	27	Federal Regional Courts; TRF1 .. TRF6	6
Specialized justice	Court of Military Justice	3	Electoral Justice Courts; TRE	27
Specialized justice	TJM	3	Regional Labor Courts; TRT	24
Total		30		62

- Supreme Federal Court
- Superior courts:
  - Superior Court of Justice
  - Superior Labor Court
  - Superior Electoral Court
  - Superior Military Court
- Second instance Courts
  - Regional Labor Courts
  - Regional Electoral Courts
  - Regional Federal Courts
- First instance courts:
  - Labor Courts
  - Electoral Courts
  - Federal Courts
  - Military Courts

== See also ==
- Judiciary of Brazil
