= Law of Brazil =

The law of Brazil is based on statutes and, more recently, on a mechanism called súmulas vinculantes. It derives mainly from the European civil law systems, particularly the Portuguese, the Napoleonic French, and the German (especially the German Civil Code).

There are many codified statutes in force in Brazil. The current Constitution of Brazil, created on October 5, 1988, is the supreme law of the country; there have been several constitutional amendments. Other important federal law documents in the country include the Civil Code, the Penal Code, the Commercial Code, the National Tax Code, the Consolidation of Labor Laws, the Customer Defense Code, the Code of Civil Procedure, and the Code of Criminal Procedure.

== Division of powers ==
The executive, judicial, and legislative branches govern Brazilian law. In these branches, the President of Brazil heads the executive branch. The judicial branch comprises the Superior Court of Justice and the Supreme Federal Court. Brazil's legislative branch encompasses the National Congress of Brazil.

== Constitution and law ==
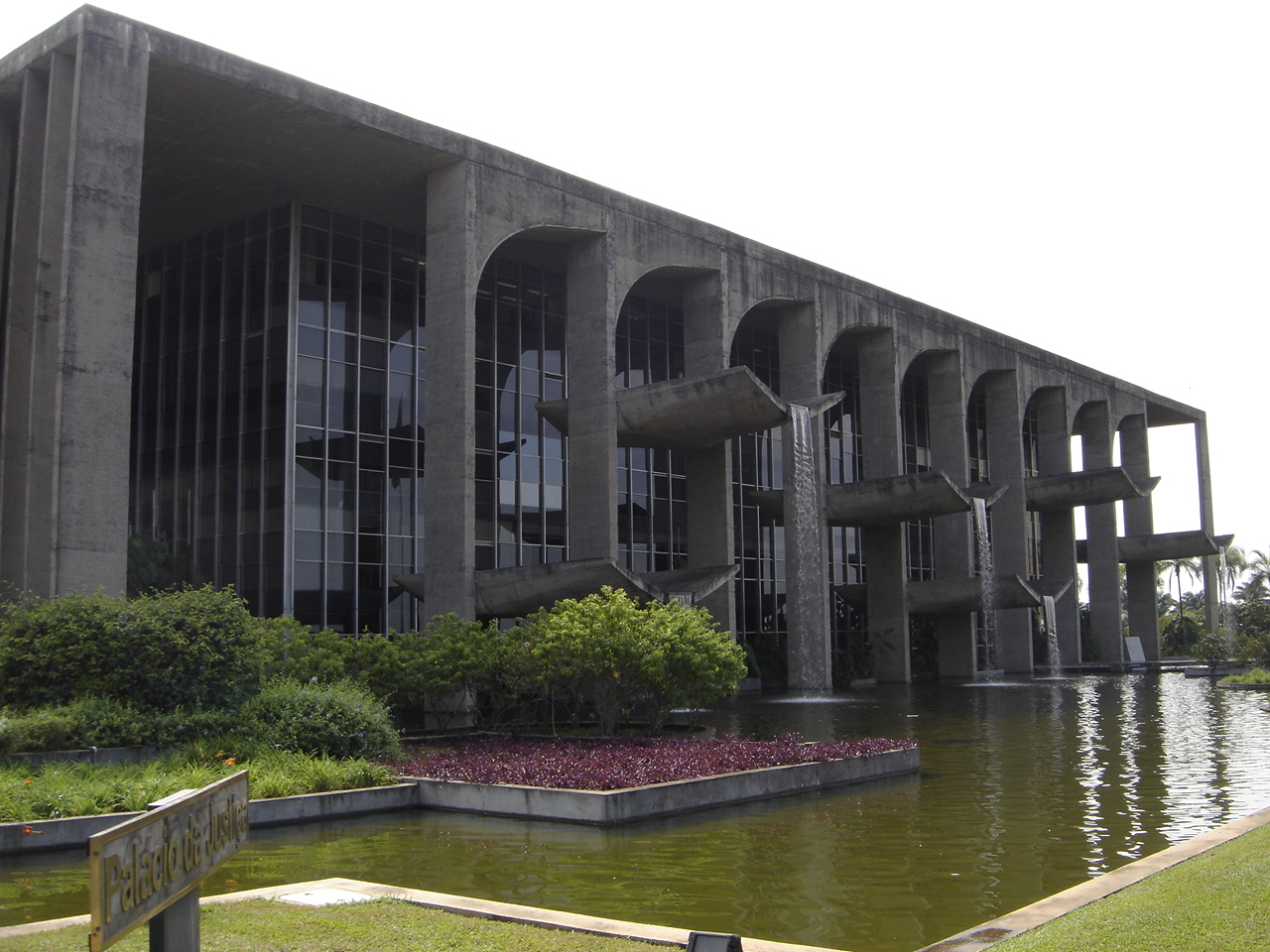
Palace of Justice in Brasília

Brazilian law is largely derived from Portuguese civil law and is related to the Roman-Germanic legal tradition. This means that the legal system is based on statutes. However, a recent constitutional reform (Amendment to the Constitution 45, passed in 2004) has introduced a mechanism similar to the stare decisis, called súmula vinculante. Nevertheless, under Article 103-A of the Constitution of Brazil, only the Supreme Court may issue binding rules. Inferior judges and courts, and the public administration, are hence obliged to obey the interpretations of the Supreme Court.

In more recent times, according to the judiciary structure framed in the Brazilian constitution, judicial power is divided between the judicial branches of the states and the Federal judicial branch, and they have different jurisdictions. The prerogatives and duties of judges are the same, however, and the differences lie only in the competencies, structures, and compositions of the Courts.

== Law and lawyers ==
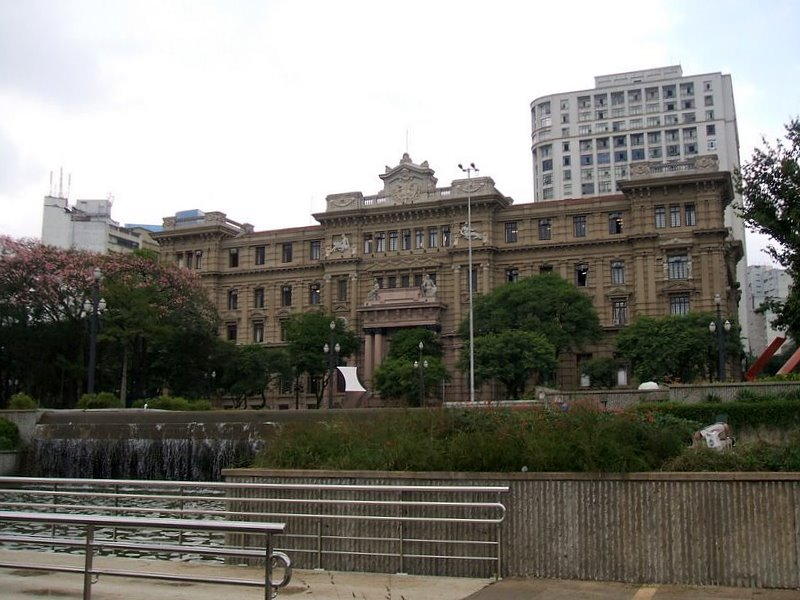
Court of Justice in São Paulo

In 2007, there were 1,024 law school programs in Brazil, with 197,664 law students. Law schools are present in each of the States of Brazil. In 2010, the total of lawyers in Brazil were 621,885. The State of São Paulo had the largest number of lawyers, 222,807, one-third of all working lawyers in the country. The State of Rio de Janeiro had 112,515 lawyers, and the State of Minas Gerais had 63,978 lawyers.

Students studying law in Brazil take five years to complete their education at a law school. Upon completing their studies, they need to pass an exam held by the Bar Association of Brazil (Ordem dos Advogados do Brasil in Portuguese).

The overall median income of the Brazilian lawyer was R$36,120 per year in 2007. The starting median income was R$20,040, and the top median was R$3,000,000. The Brazilian judge had an overall median income of R$170,000. The starting median income was R$150,500, and the top median was R$310,500. The Brazilian prosecutors had an overall median income of R$150,000. The starting median income was R$140,000, and the top median was R$270,000 per year. Nowadays, Brazilian judges and prosecutors, in almost all states, earn the same, and, in some states, prosecutors have a higher income.

== State-level judiciary ==
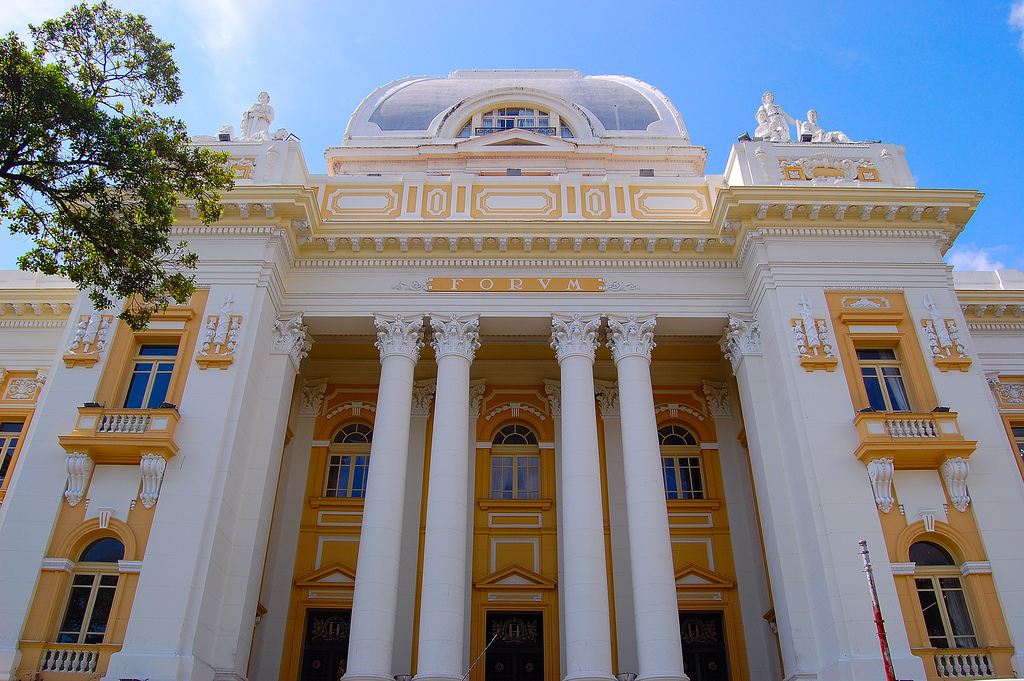
Court of Justice in Recife

=== Trial courts ===
Each state territory is divided into judicial districts, called comarcas, composed of one or more municipalities. The 27 Courts of Justice have their headquarters in the capital of each state and have jurisdiction only over their State territories. The Federal District only presents the federal-level judicial branch. Each comarca has at least one trial court, a court of first instance. Each court of first instance has a law judge and a substitute judge. The judge decides alone in all civil cases and in most criminal cases. Only intentional crimes against life are judged by jury. The judges of the courts are nominated after a selection process. There are specialized first-instance courts for family litigation or bankruptcy in some comarcas. Judgments from these district courts may be subject to judicial review following appeals to the courts of second instance.

=== Courts of Justice ===
The highest court of a state judicial system is its court of second instance, the Courts of Justice. In each Brazilian state, there is one Court of Justice (Tribunal de Justiça in Portuguese). Courts of Justice are courts of appeal, meaning they can review decisions made by trial courts and have the final word on state-level decisions, though federal courts may overturn those decisions. Some states, such as São Paulo and Minas Gerais, used to have a Court of Appeals (Tribunal de Alçada in Portuguese) which had a different jurisdiction. But article 4 of the 45th constitutional amendment to the Brazilian constitution, decreed their extinction to simplify the second instance structure.

Three judges, called desembargadores usually make second-instance judgments. These Courts are divided into civil chambers, which hear civil cases, and criminal chambers, which hear criminal cases. Judges of the Courts of Justice overview one another. A Court can expel any judge who has displayed unethical behavior.

== Federal-level judicial branch ==
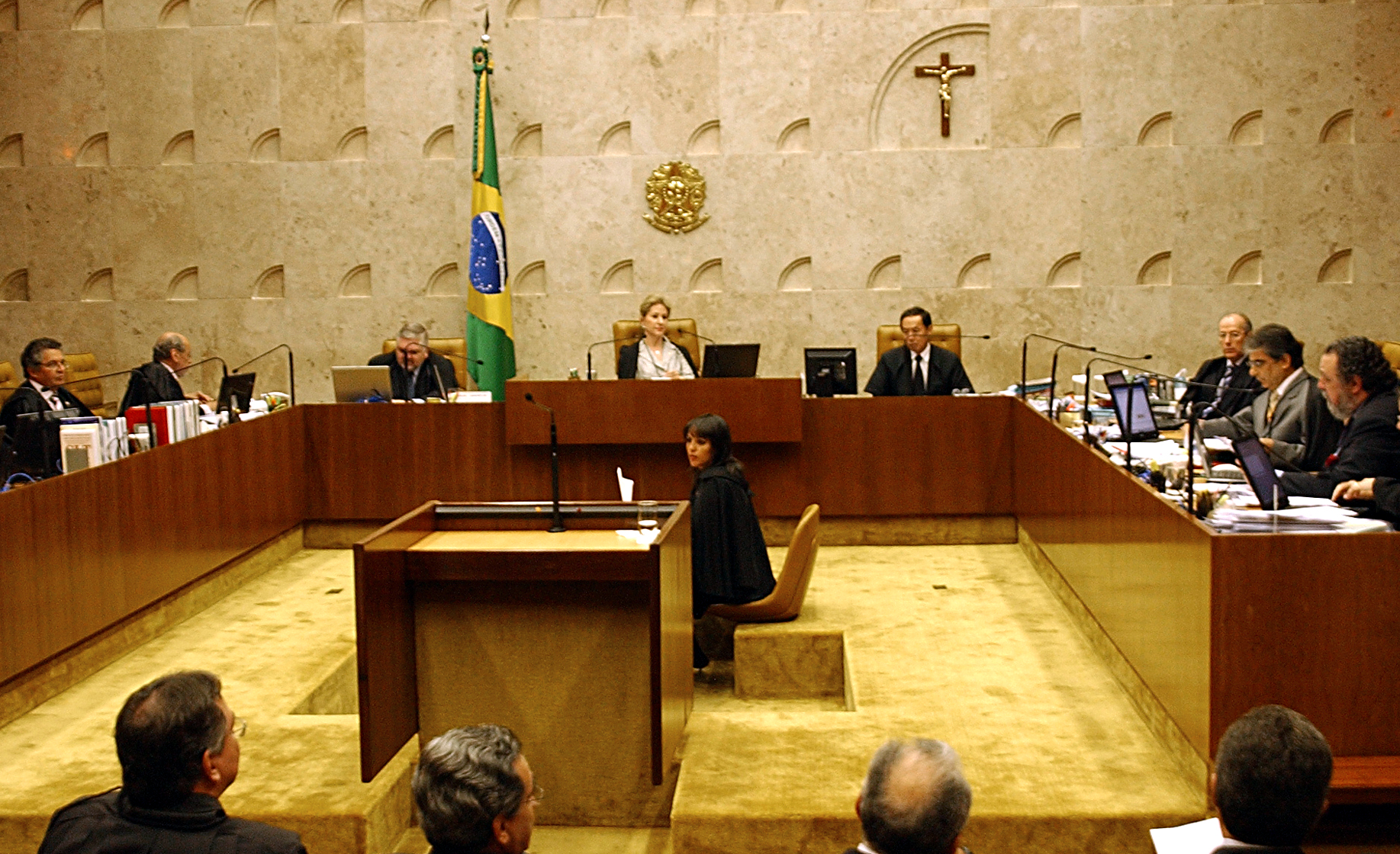
Supreme Federal Court of Brazil

The five regional Federal Courts have jurisdiction over circuits that span several states and are typically headquartered in the largest city within their territory. The regional courts are:

- The Regional Federal Court of the 1st Region has jurisdiction over the Federal District and 13 States: Minas Gerais, Bahia, Piauí, Maranhão, Goiás, Mato Grosso, Amapá, Tocantins, Pará, Amazonas, Roraima, Rondônia and Acre, with headquarters in Brasília, Federal District.
- The Regional Federal Court of the 2nd Region has jurisdiction over two States: Rio de Janeiro and Espírito Santo, with headquarters in Rio de Janeiro, Rio de Janeiro.
- The Regional Federal Court of the 3rd Region has jurisdiction over two States: São Paulo and Mato Grosso do Sul, with headquarters in São Paulo, São Paulo.
- The Regional Federal Court of the 4th Region has jurisdiction over three States: Rio Grande do Sul, Santa Catarina and Paraná, with headquarters in Porto Alegre, Rio Grande do Sul.
- The Regional Federal Court of the 5th Region has jurisdiction over six States: Sergipe, Alagoas, Pernambuco, Paraíba, Ceará and Rio Grande do Norte, with headquarters in Recife, Pernambuco.

=== Superior courts ===
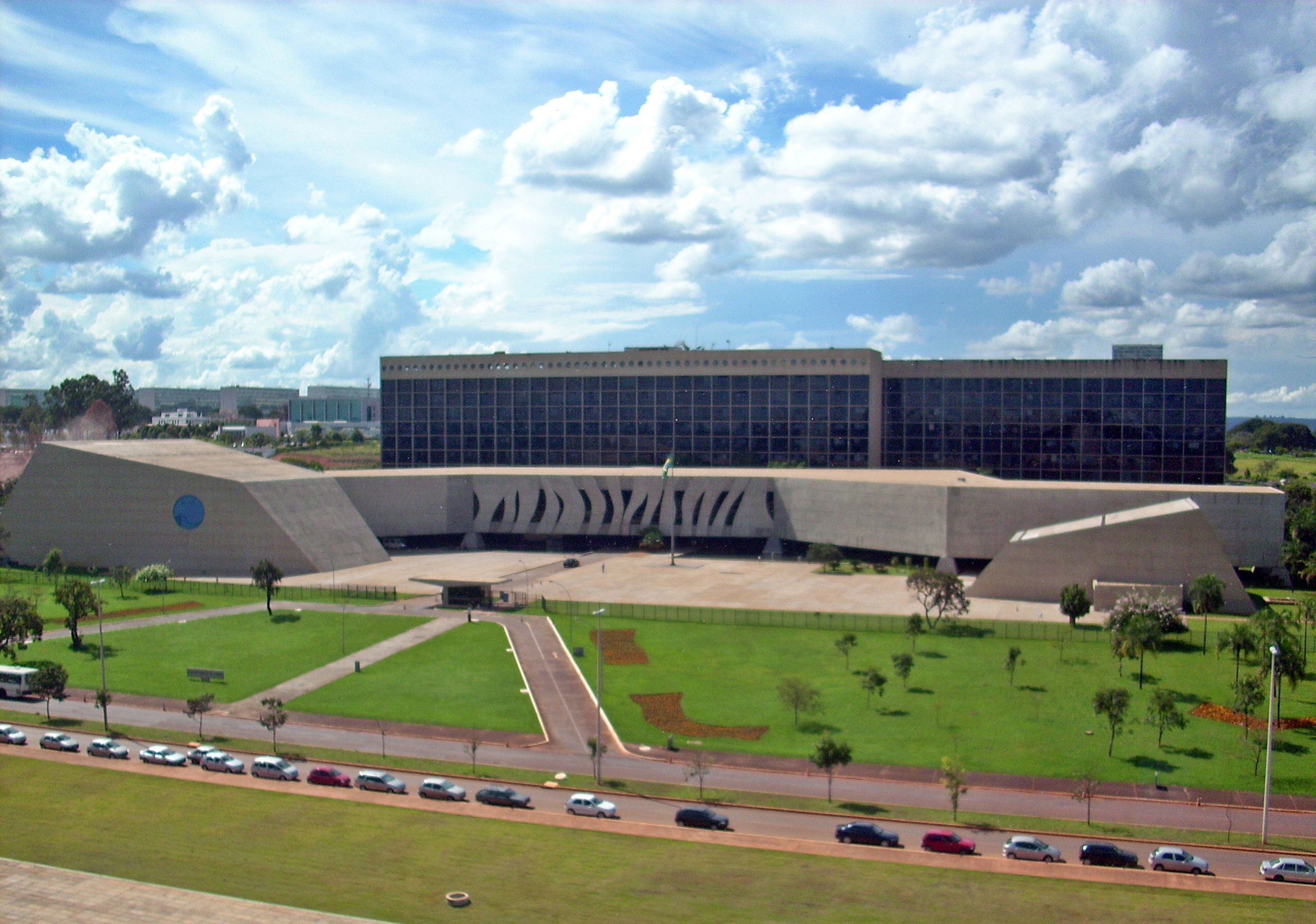
Superior Court of Justice of Brazil

Two national superior courts are making up the Supreme Court, which grant writs of certiorari in civil and criminal cases: the Superior Court of Justice (Superior Tribunal de Justiça in Portuguese) or STJ and the Supreme Federal Court (Supremo Tribunal Federal in Portuguese) or STF, the highest Brazilian court (decides issues concerning offences to the Brazilian constitution).

The STJ is the highest Brazilian court in non-constitutional matters. It grants a Special Appeal (Recurso Especial in Portuguese) when a judgment of a court of second instance offends a federal statute disposition or when two or more second-instance courts render different rulings on the same federal statute. There are parallel courts for labor law, electoral law and military law.

The STF grants Extraordinary Appeals (Recurso Extraordinário in Portuguese) when judgments of second instance courts violate the constitution. The STF is the last instance for the writ of habeas corpus and for reviews of judgments from the STJ.

The superior courts do not analyze any factual questions in their judgments, but only the application of the law and the constitution. Facts and evidence are judged by the courts of second instance, except in specific cases such as writs of habeas corpus.

== See also ==
- Crime in Brazil
- Judiciary of Brazil
- Order of Attorneys of Brazil
