= Judiciary of Brazil =

Public entities designated by the Brazilian constitution

The Judiciary of Brazil is the system of courts and judicial institutions established by the Constitution of Brazil (1988) to carry out judicial functions, ensure the rule of law, and protect constitutional guarantees. It operates under a tripartite division of powers alongside the executive and legislative branches, but maintains institutional independence and oversight. Among its key organs are the Supreme Federal Court (Supremo Tribunal Federal, STF), which serves as the ultimate constitutional court; the Superior Court of Justice (Superior Tribunal de Justiça, STJ), which handles non-constitutional federal issues; and specialized courts such as the Superior Labor Court, Superior Electoral Court, and Superior Military Court. Oversight and administration are in part managed by the National Council of Justice (Conselho Nacional de Justiça, CNJ), which regulates administrative, financial, and disciplinary matters of the judiciary. The system is divided between common justice (federal and state courts) for most civil and criminal cases, and specialized justice (labor, electoral, military) which deals with specific jurisdictional areas.

== Constitutional foundation ==
The Federal government of Brazil is defined by the 1988 constitution which defines a tripartite separation of powers into the legislative, executive, and judicial branches of government. Aside from those, the country also has the Public Ministry which acts autonomously and has in the past been referred to as the country's fourth branch.

In terms of jurisdiction, the main division is between common justice (Portuguese: Justiça Comum) and specialized justice (Justiça Especializada). Common justice, composed of federal and state justices (and the Federal District's own justice), handles most civil and criminal cases. Specialized justice, composed of electoral, military and labor justices, handles more specialized cases which also have their own specific procedures.

Article 92 of the Constitution divides the judiciary into nine organs:

- the Supreme Federal Court (Supremo Tribunal Federal or "STF");
- the National Justice Council (Conselho Nacional de Justiça or "CNJ");
- the Superior Court of Justice (Superior Tribunal de Justiça or "STJ");
- the Superior Labor Court (Tribunal Superior do Trabalho or "TST");
- the Regional Federal Courts (Tribunais Regionais Federais or "TRFs") and Federal Judges;
- the labor courts and judges;
- the electoral courts and judges,
- the military courts and judges; and
- the courts and judges of the States, Federal District and territories.

There is no judicial organization at the municipality level.

== National Council of Justice ==
Created by Constitutional Amendment 45 of 2004, also known as the Judicial Reform amendment, the National Council of Justice (Conselho Nacional de Justiça) has the express purpose of controlling the administrative and financial performance of the judiciary and the fulfillment of the duties of individual judges.

Its constitutional duties are to watch over the judiciary's autonomy and the maintenance of the Statue of Magistrature, ensure the constitutional principles of legality, impersonality, morality, publicity and efficiency are followed by the public administration, define aspects of the internal administration of the Judiciary, receive complaints against members of the judiciary and judge disciplinary procedures against them.

The historical antecedent of the council is the National Council of Magistrature (Conselho Nacional da Magistratura), created in 1975 with correctional powers over members of Brazilian courts, however without truly interfering in the Judiciary's autonomy. Attempts to increase this control recurred during the Constitutional Assembly of 1988, without success, and again in 1992 as part of the greater push for judiciary reform. It finally became law twelve years later.

== Federal courts ==
=== Supreme Federal Court ===
The 92 courts of the Brazilian judiciary
	State		Federal	
Superior courts		0	Supreme Federal Court; STF	1
Superior courts		0	Federal superior courts STJ TSE TST STM	4
Common justice	Court of Justice; TJ	27	Federal Regional Courts; TRF1 .. TRF6	6
Specialized justice	Court of Military Justice	3	Electoral Justice Courts; TRE	27
Specialized justice	TJM	3	Regional Labor Courts; TRT	24
Total		30		62

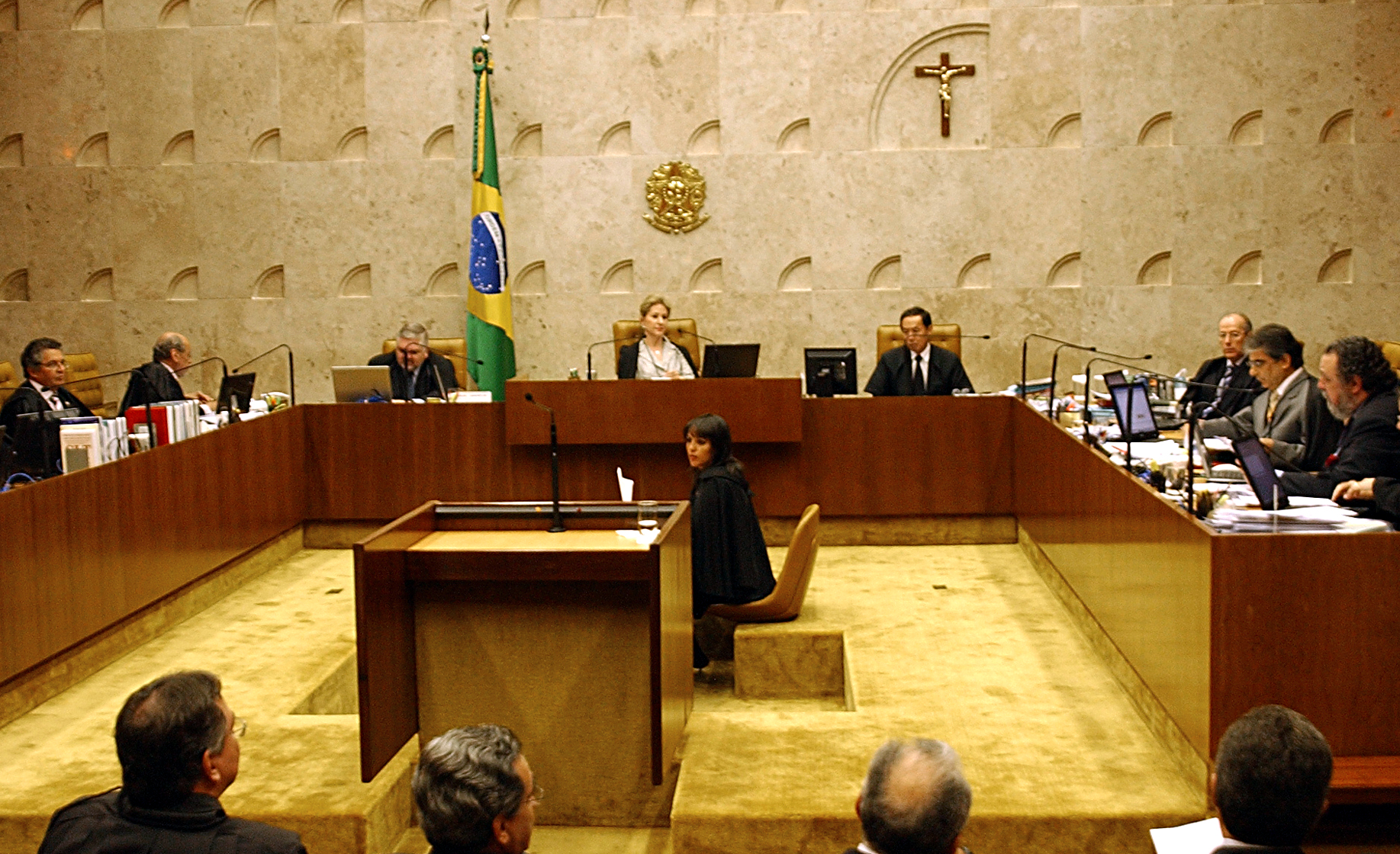
Supreme Federal Court of Brazil

The Supreme Federal Court (Supremo Tribunal Federal) is the highest body of the Brazilian Judiciary. Its main responsibility is to serve as the ultimate guardian of the Brazilian Constitution, with the roles of a constitutional court. It is composed of eleven ministers.

Its ministers are chosen from citizens between 35 and 65 years of age, with a clean reputation and juridical knowledge, initially suggested by the President, and after vetting and approval by the Senate, through the Commission of Constitution, Justice and Citizenship and then a vote where they must be approved by an absolute majority of all members of the Brazilian Senate to then be properly named by the President.

The jurisdiction of the Court is defined by the constitution and is divided in two groups: matters of original jurisdiction, and matters of appellate jurisdiction. The difference is whether the lawsuit starts in the Court itself or reaches the court through an appeal.

Matters of original jurisdiction are: direct unconstitutionality lawsuits (Ação Direta de Inconstitucionalidade); constitutional declaration lawsuits (Ação Declaratória de Constitutionalidade); cases of privileged venue ("foro privilegiado"); lawsuits between a foreign state or international organization and the Brazilian Federal Government, its states, the federal district and territories, or just between the internal federative units themselves and the federal government; extradition requests; injunction mandates against federal entities; and other specific cases related to the judiciary and the maintenance of the Court's authority.

Its appellate jurisdiction involves: ordinary appeals of superior court decisions; extraordinary appeals (recurso extraordinário) of decisions of appellate courts which violate the constitution, declare unconstitutional a federal law, or involve conflicts between federal law and the laws of states and municipalities.

=== Federal superior courts ===
There are four federal superior courts, the Superior Court of Justice (STJ), the Superior Electoral Court (TSE), the Superior Labor Court (TST), and the Superior Military Court (STM).

==== Superior Court of Justice ====
The Superior Court of Justice (Superior Tribunal de Justiça) is the highest Brazilian court for non-constitutional issues concerning both states and Federal ordinary courts, dealing mainly with matters of Common Justice. Its responsibility is to standardize the interpretation of federal law in the country's territory.

To achieve this purpose, the Court has a special appeal available for cases where a judgement rendered by a court of second instance conflicts with a federal statute disposition or when two or more second instance courts rule differently on the same federal statute.

The Superior Court of Justice also has a role in the adjudication of common crimes committed by certain officials who are accorded the special status of "privileged forum" defined by the law to apply to state governors, appellate court judges, and some other positions of higher prestige in Brazil's public service, who skip the courts of first instance and are judged exclusively by the Superior Court, which also is responsible for habeas corpus and other appeals filed by these public servants.

It is composed of 33 ministers, chosen by the President of Brazil from three choices named by the Court itself, with prospective ministers also having to do a public Sabbath in the Senate in order to finally be named by the President, ministers must come from a diverse background, with a third from federal appellate courts, a third from state-level appellate courts, and the last third hailing from the Public Ministry.

==== Superior Electoral Court ====
The Brazilian Electoral system is controlled by the country's Judiciary, specifically the Regional Electoral Courts (Tribunais Regionais Eleitorais), the Superior Electoral Court (Tribunal Superior Eleitoral) and electoral judges, notably it does not have its own magistrature, being composed for the most part of magistrates from other Courts and the Judiciary.

The Superior Electoral Court is composed of seven members, three chosen from the ministers of Supreme Federal Court, two chosen from ministers of the Superior Court of Justice and two chosen from lawyers indicated by the Supreme Federal Court and named by the President of Brazil. Its jurisdiction involves the registry of Brazilian Political Parties, the organization of Electoral Zones, the maintenance of its authority and its appellate jurisdiction over decisions of the Regional Courts.

==== Superior Labor Court ====
The National Labor Council (Conselho Nacional do Trabalho), was created in 1923 as a subdivision of the Ministry of Agriculture, Industry and Commerce, as such, it was originally part of the executive branch rather than the judiciary. In 1946 it was reformed into the Superior Labor Court (Tribunal Superior do Trabalho).

Headquartered in Brasília, the Superior Labor Court (Tribunal Superior do Trabalho) is the highest court for the Labor Justice. It is composed of 27 ministers, named by the President of Brazil after approval by the Brazilian Senate, a fifth of whom must be lawyers or members of the Public Ministry, with the rest composed of Labor Judges. Its jurisdiction involves appeals from cases already in the Regional Labor Courts and cases regarding its own jurisdiction and the maintenance of its authority.

==== Superior Military Court ====
The military justice system is divided between the federal military justice and the state military justice, the first is in charge of matters concerning the Brazilian Armed Forces.

The first instance of the federal military justice are the Councils of Justice, formed by a military judge and four officers, whose positions and rank depend on the accused, councils are divided between special councils, with jurisdiction over officers and Permanent Councils, with jurisdiction over those of enlisted rank (Praças).

The second instance of the federal military justice is the Superior Military Court (Superior Tribunal Militar), which acts as an appellate court for the Councils of Justice and also for specific appeals from the second instance of the state military justice.

=== Regional courts and judges ===
There are five Federal Regional Courts (Tribunal Regional Federal - TRF), each covering several Brazilian states. They are established by articles 107 and 108 of the Constitution. Together with the Federal judges (juízes federais), the Federal Regional Courts make up the Federal Courts of Brazil.

Each Federal Regional Court has at least seven judges of the second instance, named by the President, recruited preferably from the region, with at least a fifth of those recruited from lawyers with at least ten years of experience. .

The Regional Court serves mainly as an Appellate Court for cases from the Judges in the region, whose jurisdiction is defined in articles 108 and 109 of the Brazilian Constitution:

- Causes where the federal government, its agencies or enterprises have an interest, with the exception of bankruptcy and industrial injury, which are in states' jurisdiction, and also respecting the specific jurisdiction of the labor and electoral courts, which prevails over federal ordinary courts jurisdiction;
- Causes involving foreign governments or recognized international public organization;
- Political crimes;
- Crimes against the labor organization, including slavery (as decided in 2006 by the STF);
- Crimes committed aboard ships or aircraft;
- Foreigners and nationality rights;
- Indigenous peoples' rights.

As a matter of internal organization, while the Regional Courts involve several States, they are internally divided between the States, with each State having its own Section, headquartered in the Capital, with Subsections defined by law spread over the cities of the State.

=== Regional labor courts and labor judges ===
Together with the Superior Labor Court, the Regional Labor Courts and Labor Judges compose the general Labor Justice System of Brazil, with jurisdiction over most labor cases, including collective cases regarding Trade Unions. They have no jurisdiction over civil servants, except in specific cases at the municipal level and employees of nationalized companies, such as Petrobras and the Correios.

The first instance is composed of the Labor Judges, organized in specific Labor Courts (Varas do Trabalho, present in most major cities, with jurisdiction to receive most complaints from individual workers, often without the need of a lawyer, and also judge administrative matters concerning labor law. Exceptionally, when there is no Labor Court, cases of labor law can be presented to the local judge.

The second instance is composed of the Regional Labor Courts, organized in 22 regions over the country, most of those receiving a specific State, these Courts have jurisdiction over collective complaints on the state-level and also appellate jurisdiction over cases handled by the local judges.

The Regional Labor Courts are composed of at least seven judges, unofficially given the title of Desembargador, recruited preferably from the local region, of whom a fifth must be lawyers with at least ten years of experience or members of the Labor Public Ministry, similarly to other Regional Courts, they are named by the President of Brazil with approval from the Brazilian Senate.

=== Electoral courts and judges ===
The Regional Courts are distributed through the country's State capitals, each composed of seven judges, two chosen from the second-instance State Courts, two chosen by the State Courts from the first-instance judges, one judge of the Regional Federal Court headquartered in the State's capital, or if there isn't, a Federal Judge, the last two are named from six lawyers of notable juridical knowledge indicated by the local State Court.

These Courts have jurisdiction over the registry of the Municipal and State Directories of Brazilian Political Parties, candidates to the positions of Governor, Vice-Governor, and Federal and Local Congressmen, the Courts organize the local Electoral Juntas, designating their headquarters and jurisdiction, have the duty to maintain their authority with a provision to call upon federal assistance, and also serve as an appellate court to judgements made by Electoral Judges.

The Electoral Judges are the first-instance judges of the State and Federal District. Their jurisdiction involves processing and adjudicating common and electoral crimes, except those under the jurisdiction of the Superior or Regional Courts. They issue Electoral IDs, grant Electoral Transfers, and take action to prevent illicit actions during elections.

Finally, the Electoral Juntas are composed of a Judge, who serves as the president of the Junta, and two to four citizens with an honest reputation. These Juntas are in charge of solving challenges and incidents regarding the counting of votes and issuing Diplomas to the candidates elected in municipal elections.

== State courts ==
=== Courts of Justice ===
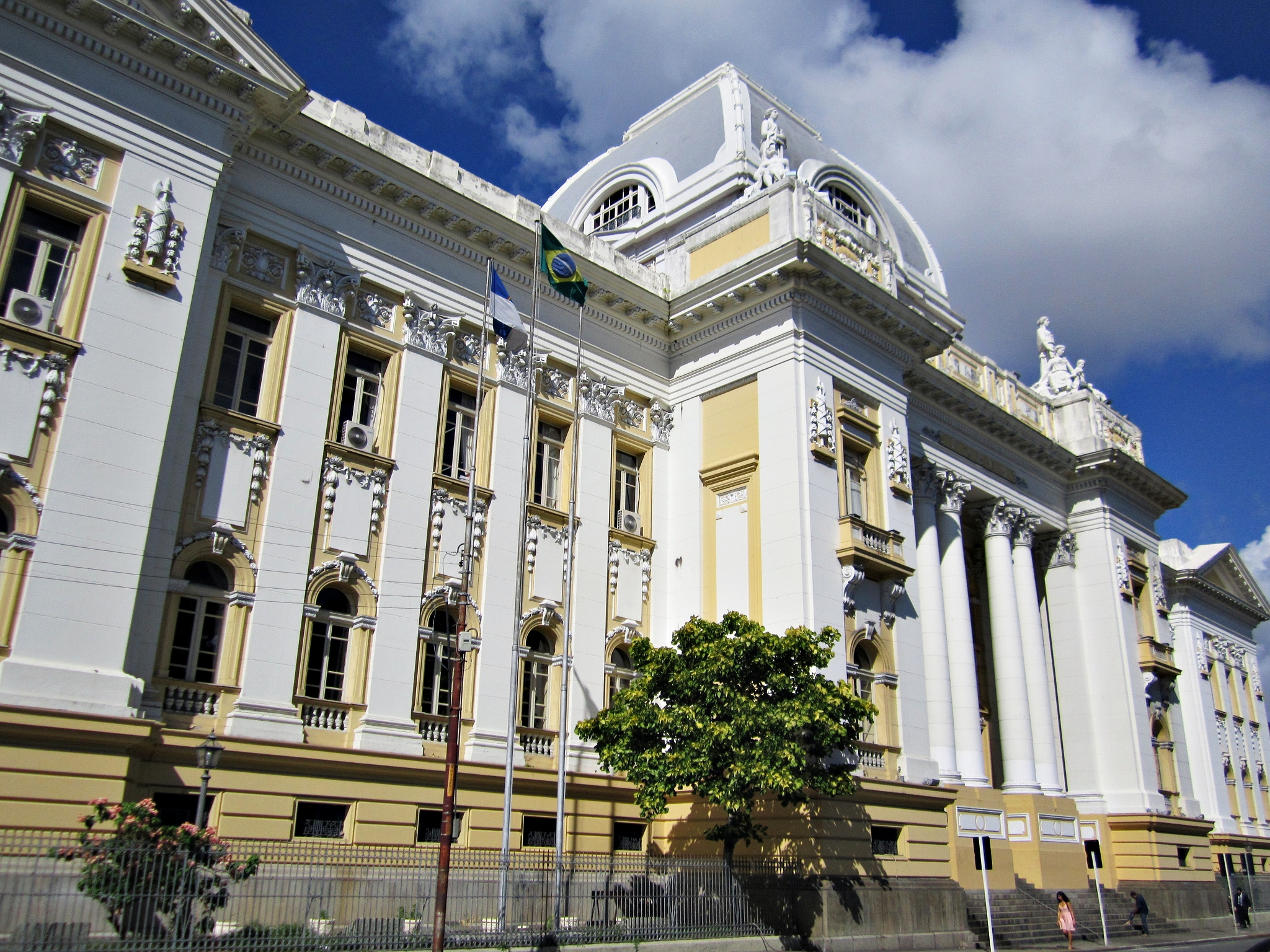
Pernambuco Court of Justice

The highest court of a state judicial system is the Court of Justice (Tribunal de Justiça). There are 27 Courts of Justice, one per Brazilian state, headquartered in the state capital, functioning mostly as an appellate court, and one in the federal capital. Second instance judgments are usually rendered by three judges, called desembargadores, however in specific cases the decision may be made by a single judge. Large courts are usually divided into different sections, specialized by subject matter.

=== Military courts and judges ===
The state military justice system has jurisdiction over the Auxiliary Forces, composed of the States' Military Police and Military Firefighters Corps.

The State Military Justice is organized on the State-level, with the first instance having a few particularities in regard to the officers rank and post, as the Auxiliary Forces do not have Generals, and the second instance being either a State-level Court of Military Justice or a specific board within the State's ordinary Court of Justice.

=== Courts and judges of the states, federal district and territories ===
==== Trial courts ====
Each state territory is divided into judicial districts (comarca), which are composed of one or more municipalities. Each judicial district has at least one trial court (Vara) that functions as a court of first instance for most cases. In large judicial districts with two or more trial courts, there may be Small claims courts as well as specialized courts by subject, such as courts handling exclusively criminal cases or family litigation. Judgments from the trial courts can be the subject of judicial review following appeals to the Courts of Justice.

Each court of first instance has a judge and may have a substitute judge. The judge decides alone in civil cases and most criminal cases, except that a jury has jurisdiction over willful crimes against life (murder, attempted murder, infanticide, abortion and inducement, instigation and assistance to suicide).

== See also ==
- Federal courts of Brazil
- Judiciary of Portugal
- Law of Brazil
- Ministry of Justice (Brazil)
