= List of Federal Agrotechnical Schools in Brazil =

Federal Agrotechnical Schools in Brazil are listed below.

== List ==
- Federal Agrotechnical School of Satuba
- Federal Agrotechnical School of Manaus
- Federal Agrotechnical School of São Gabriel da Cachoeira
- Federal Agrotechnical School of Catú
- Federal Agrotechnical School of Guanambí
- Federal Agrotechnical School of Santa Inês
- Federal Agrotechnical School of Senhor do Bonfim
- Federal Agrotechnical School of Crato
- Federal Agrotechnical School of Iguatú
- Federal Agrotechnical School of Alegre
- Federal Agrotechnical School of Colatina
- Federal Agrotechnical School of Santa Teresa
- Federal Agrotechnical School of Ceres
- Federal Agrotechnical School of Rio Verde
- Federal Agrotechnical School of Urutaí
- Federal Agrotechnical School of Codó
- Federal Agrotechnical School of São Luís
- Federal Agrotechnical School of Bambuí
- Federal Agrotechnical School of Barbacena
- Federal Agrotechnical School of Inconfidentes
- Federal Agrotechnical School of Januária
- Federal Agrotechnical School of Machado
- Federal Agrotechnical School of Muzambinho
- Federal Agrotechnical School of Rio Pomba
- Federal Agrotechnical School of Salinas
- Federal Agrotechnical School of São João Evangelista
- Federal Agrotechnical School of Uberaba
- Federal Agrotechnical School of Uberlândia
- Federal Agrotechnical School of Cáceres
- Federal Agrotechnical School of Cuiabá
- Federal Agrotechnical School of Castanhal
- Federal Agrotechnical School of Sousa
- Federal Agrotechnical School of Barreiros
- Federal Agrotechnical School of Belo Jardim
- Federal Agrotechnical School of Vitória de Santo Antão
- Federal Agrotechnical School of Colorado do Oeste
- Federal Agrotechnical School of Rio do Sul
- Federal Agrotechnical School of Alegrete
- Federal Agrotechnical School of Bento Gonçalves
- Federal Agrotechnical School of São Vicente do Sul
- Federal Agrotechnical School of Sertão
- Federal Agrotechnical School of Concórdia
- Federal Agrotechnical School of Sombrio
- Federal Agrotechnical School of São Cristóvão
- Federal Agrotechnical School of Araguatins

== See also ==
- Federal institutions of Brazil
