= Supreme Federal Court =

Supreme court of Brazil

- Supremo Tribunal Federal
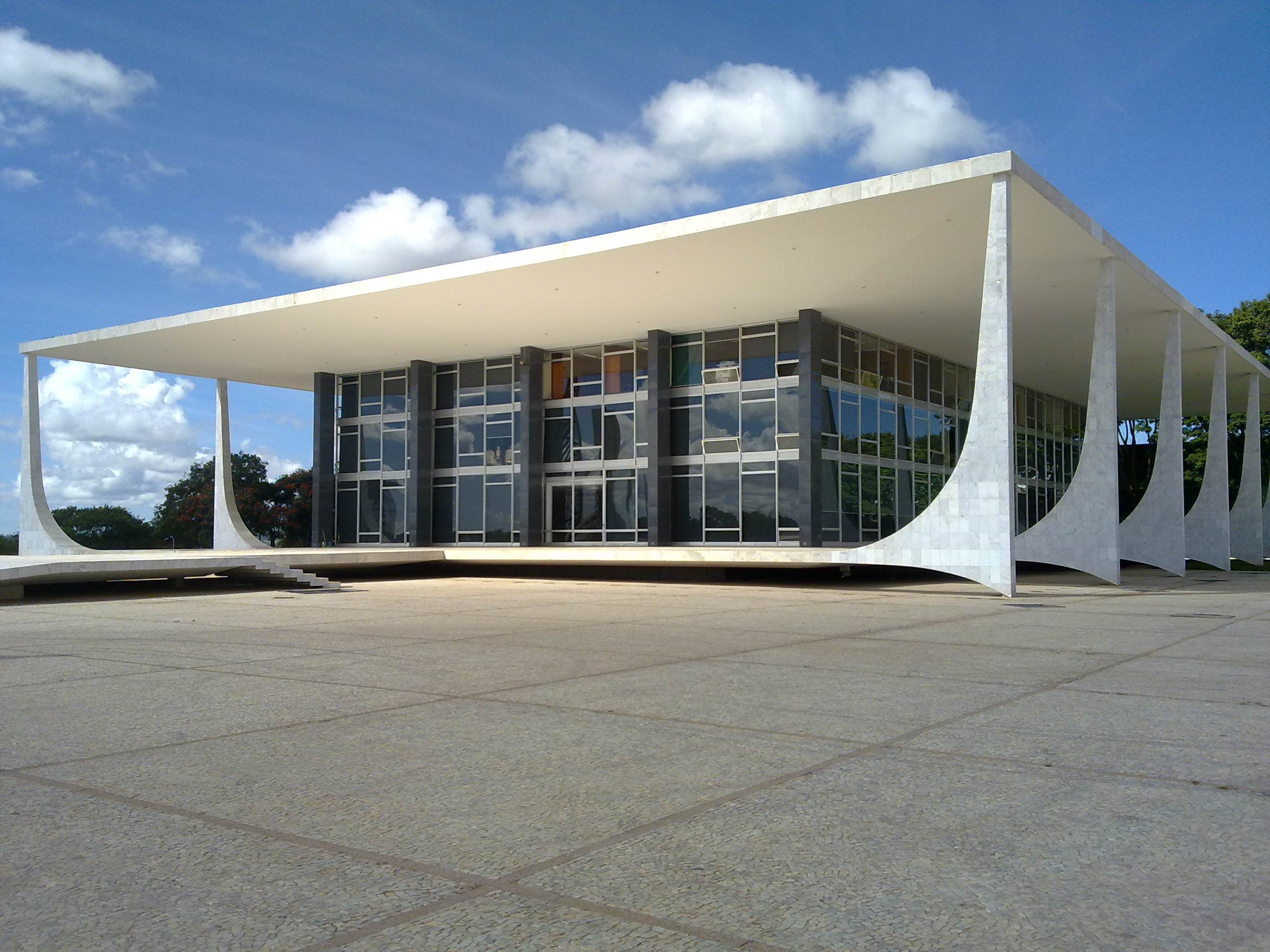
- The Supreme Federal Court Palace

- Interactive map of Supreme Federal Court
- 15°48′08″S 47°51′43″W
- Established: 28 February 1891; 135 years ago
- Location: Brasília, Federal District, Brazil
- Coordinates: 15°48′08″S 47°51′43″W
- Composition method: Presidential nomination with Senate confirmation
- Authorised by: Constitution of Brazil
- Appeals from: Superior Courts; State Courts of Justice
- Judge term length: Life tenure (mandatory retirement at age 75)
- Number of positions: 11
- Website: portal.stf.jus.br

President
- Currently: Edson Fachin
- Since: 29 September 2025

Vice President
- Currently: Alexandre de Moraes
- Since: 29 September 2025

The Supreme Federal Court (Portuguese: Supremo Tribunal Federal, [suˈpɾẽmu tɾibuˈnaw fedeˈɾaw], STF) is the supreme court (court of last resort) of Brazil, serving primarily as the country's constitutional court. It is the highest court of law in Brazil for constitutional issues and its rulings cannot be appealed. On cases involving exclusively non-constitutional issues, regarding federal laws, the highest court is, by rule, the Superior Court of Justice.

== History ==
The current court was preceded by the House of Appeals of Brazil (Casa de Suplicação do Brasil), which was inaugurated during the colonial era on 10 May 1808, the year that the Portuguese royal family (the House of Braganza) arrived in Rio de Janeiro after fleeing to Brazil.

The Brazilian proclamation of Independence and the adoption of the Imperial Constitution in 1824 preceded the establishment of the Supreme Court of Justice (Supremo Tribunal de Justiça) in 1829, which served as the Brazilian Empire's supreme court. With the fall of the monarchy and Brazil's first Republican Constitution, the current court was established.

Although the constitutional norms that regulated the creation of the court allowed Deodoro da Fonseca, Brazil's first president, to nominate an entirely new court, the president chose to nominate as the first members of the Supreme Federal Court the ministers who were then serving as members of the imperial court that preceded it.

Two hundred members have served on the court. The Constitution of 1891 provided that the court would have 15 members. When Getúlio Vargas came into power, the number of members was reduced to 11. The number was changed to 16 in 1965, but returned to 11 in 1969 and has not changed since. Of all Presidents of Brazil, only Café Filho and Carlos Luz (acting) never nominated a minister.

All judicial and administrative meetings of the STF have been broadcast live on television since 2002. The court is open for the public to watch the meetings.

On 8 January 2023, the building was attacked by supporters of the former president, Jair Bolsonaro. On November 13, 2024, a bomb was set off outside the court. The perpetrator was the only fatality.

== Functions ==
Alongside its appeal competence, mostly by the Extraordinary Appeal (Recurso Extraordinário), the Court has a small range of cases of original jurisdiction, including the power of judicial review, judging the constitutionality of laws passed by the National Congress, through a Direct Action of Unconstitutionality (Ação Direta de Inconstitucionalidade, or ADI). There are also other mechanisms for reaching the Court directly, such as the Declaratory Action of Constitutionality (Ação Declaratória de Constitucionalidade, or ADC) and the Direct Action of Unconstitutionality by Omission (Ação Direta de Inconstitucionalidade por Omissão or ADO).

== Case law ==
In May 2009 The Economist called the Supreme Federal Court "the most overburdened court in the world, thanks to a plethora of rights and privileges entrenched in the country's 1988 constitution (...) till recently the tribunal's decisions did not bind lower courts. The result was a court that is overstretched to the point of mutiny. The Supreme Court received 100,781 cases last year."

Overruling seems to be frequent in STF jurisprudence: "three years ago when the STF adopted the understanding that defendants who have a conviction upheld by a single appellate court may be sent to jail to begin serving their sentences. (...) The 2016 decision happened largely due to a change in opinion from Minister Gilmar Mendes (...). He had voted against sending defendants to jail after a single failed appeal in 2009, but changed his mind in 2016. Jump to 2019, and the circumstances – both political and judicial – have changed".

== President and Vice President ==
The President of the STF and its Vice President are elected by their peers for a two-year term by secret ballot. The incumbent president is Minister Luís Roberto Barroso.

Reelection for a consecutive term is not allowed. By tradition, the most senior minister who has not yet served in the presidential role is elected as the president by the court members, to avoid politicisation of the court.

If all currently sitting members have already served in the presidential role, the rotation starts all over again. However, due to vacancies caused by the compulsory retirement age and subsequent appointment of new ministers, it is very rare for the cycle to be ever completed. Some ministers are forced to retire before their turn for the presidency arrives, as was expected to happen with Teori Zavascki.

According to the same convention, the minister who is next in the line of succession for the presidency will serve as the vice-president for the time being. Also by tradition, the elections of the president and vice-president are never unanimous, there being always one isolated minority vote in each election, as the ministers who are to be elected never cast their votes for themselves; such votes are cast either for the dean of the court— its most senior member — or for some other elder minister that the one to be elected admires and wants to pay homage to.

The chief justice is also the 4th in the presidential line of succession, when the President of the Republic becomes prevented to be in charge, being preceded by the Vice President, the President of the Chamber of Deputies, and the President of the Federal Senate, as provided in Article 80 of the Brazilian Constitution.

== Current members ==
The eleven judges of the court are called Ministers (Ministros), although have no similarity with the government body of ministers. They are appointed by the President and approved by the Federal Senate, with approval requiring an absolute majority of 41 votes. While there is no term length, there is a mandatory retirement age of 75.

Former president Incumbent president Incumbent vice president
Order of seniority	Justice^{[M]}	Born (date and state)	Appointed by	Senate confirmation vote	Age at inauguration	Initial date (inauguration)	Limit date (retirement)	Main previous functions
1	Gilmar Mendes	30 December 1955 in Mato Grosso	Cardoso	57–15	46	20 June 2002	30 December 2030	Prosecutor of the Republic (1985–1988), deputy chief for Legal Issues of the Chief of Staff (1996–2000), Attorney General of the Union (2000–2002)
2	Cármen Lúcia	19 April 1954 in Minas Gerais	Lula	55–1	52	21 June 2006	19 April 2029	Attorney of the State of Minas Gerais (1983–2006)
3	Dias Toffoli	15 November 1967 in São Paulo	Lula	58–9	41	23 October 2009	15 November 2042	Lawyer (1991–2009), deputy chief for Legal Issues of the Chief of Staff (2003–2005), Attorney General of the Union (2007–2009)
4	Luiz Fux	26 April 1953 in Rio de Janeiro	Rousseff	68–2	57	3 March 2011	26 April 2028	Prosecutor of the Public Prosecutor's Office of Rio de Janeiro (1979–1982), judge of the state of Rio de Janeiro (1983–1997), apellate judge of the Court of Justice of Rio de Janeiro (1997–2001), justice of the Superior Court of Justice (2001–2011)
5	Edson Fachin	8 February 1958 in Rio Grande do Sul	Rousseff	52–27	57	16 June 2015	8 February 2033	Lawyer (1980–2015), Attorney of the State of Paraná (1990–2006)
6	Alexandre de Moraes	13 December 1968 in São Paulo	Temer	55–13	48	22 March 2017	13 December 2043	Prosecutor of the Public Prosecutor's Office of the state of São Paulo (1991–2002), lawyer (2010–2014), minister of Justice and Public Security (2016–2017)
7	Nunes Marques	16 May 1972 in Piauí	Bolsonaro	57–10	48	5 November 2020	16 May 2047	Apellate judge of the Regional Federal Court of the 1st Region (2011–2020)
8	André Mendonça	27 December 1972 in São Paulo	Bolsonaro	47–32	48	16 December 2021	27 December 2047	Attorney General of the Union (2019–2021), Minister of Justice and Public Security (2020)
9	Cristiano Zanin	15 November 1975 in São Paulo	Lula	58–18	47	3 August 2023	15 November 2050	Lawyer (2000–2023)
10	Flávio Dino	30 April 1968 in Maranhão	Lula	47–31	55	22 February 2024	30 April 2043	Minister of Justice and Public Security (2023–2024), Governor of Maranhão (2015–2022), Senator for Maranhão (2023), federal judge (1996–2006)
11	(vacant)							

Notes

- **M.** Names in bold are the names used in social denomination.

== In relation to other courts ==
The 92 courts of the Brazilian judiciary
	State		Federal	
Superior courts		0	Supreme Federal Court; STF	1
Superior courts		0	Federal superior courts STJ TSE TST STM	4
Common justice	Court of Justice; TJ	27	Federal Regional Courts; TRF1 .. TRF6	6
Specialized justice	Court of Military Justice	3	Electoral Justice Courts; TRE	27
Specialized justice	TJM	3	Regional Labor Courts; TRT	24
Total		30		62

== Gallery ==
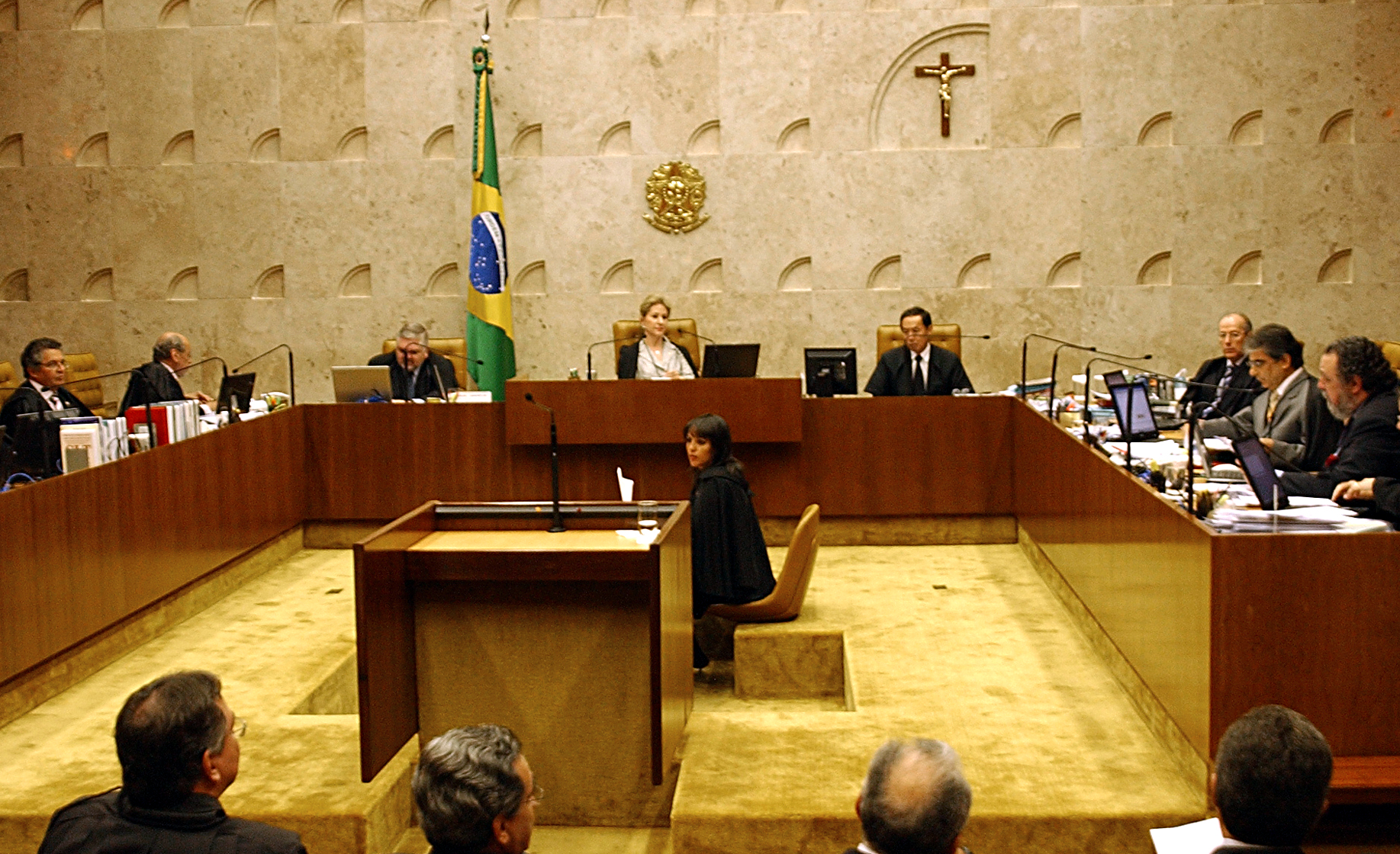
The Supreme Federal Court in session

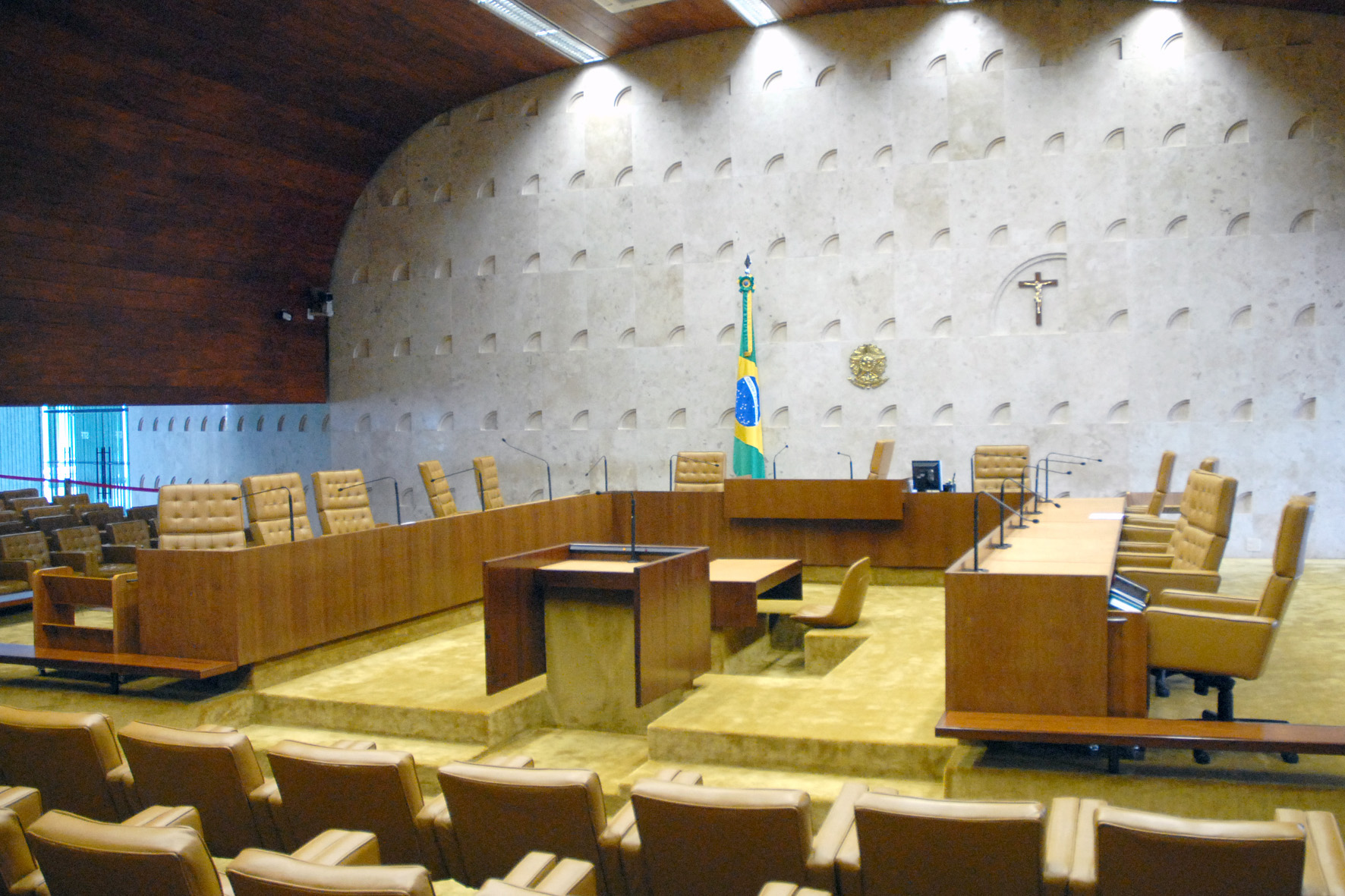
The courtroom of the Supreme Federal Court

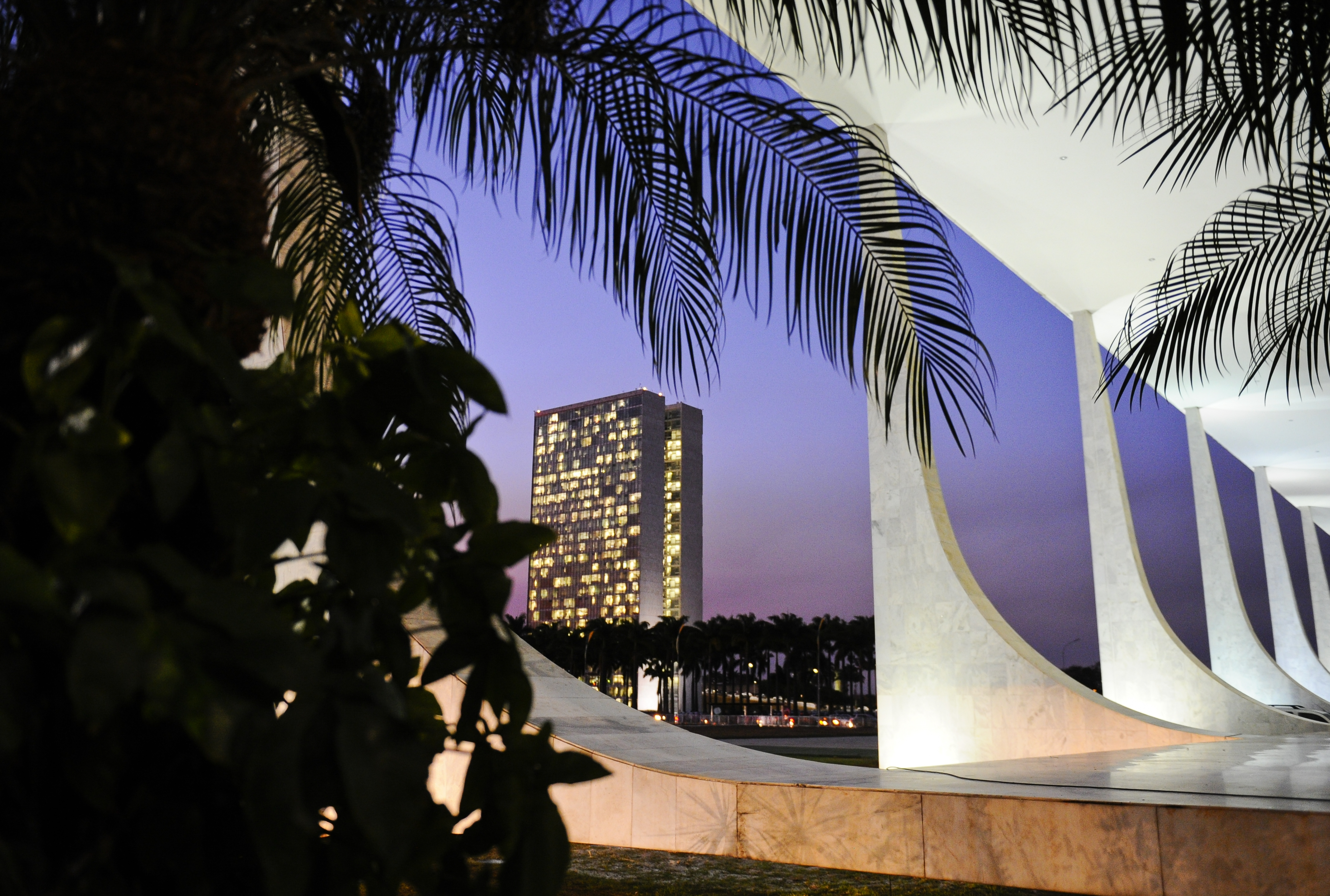
Supreme Federal Court at night

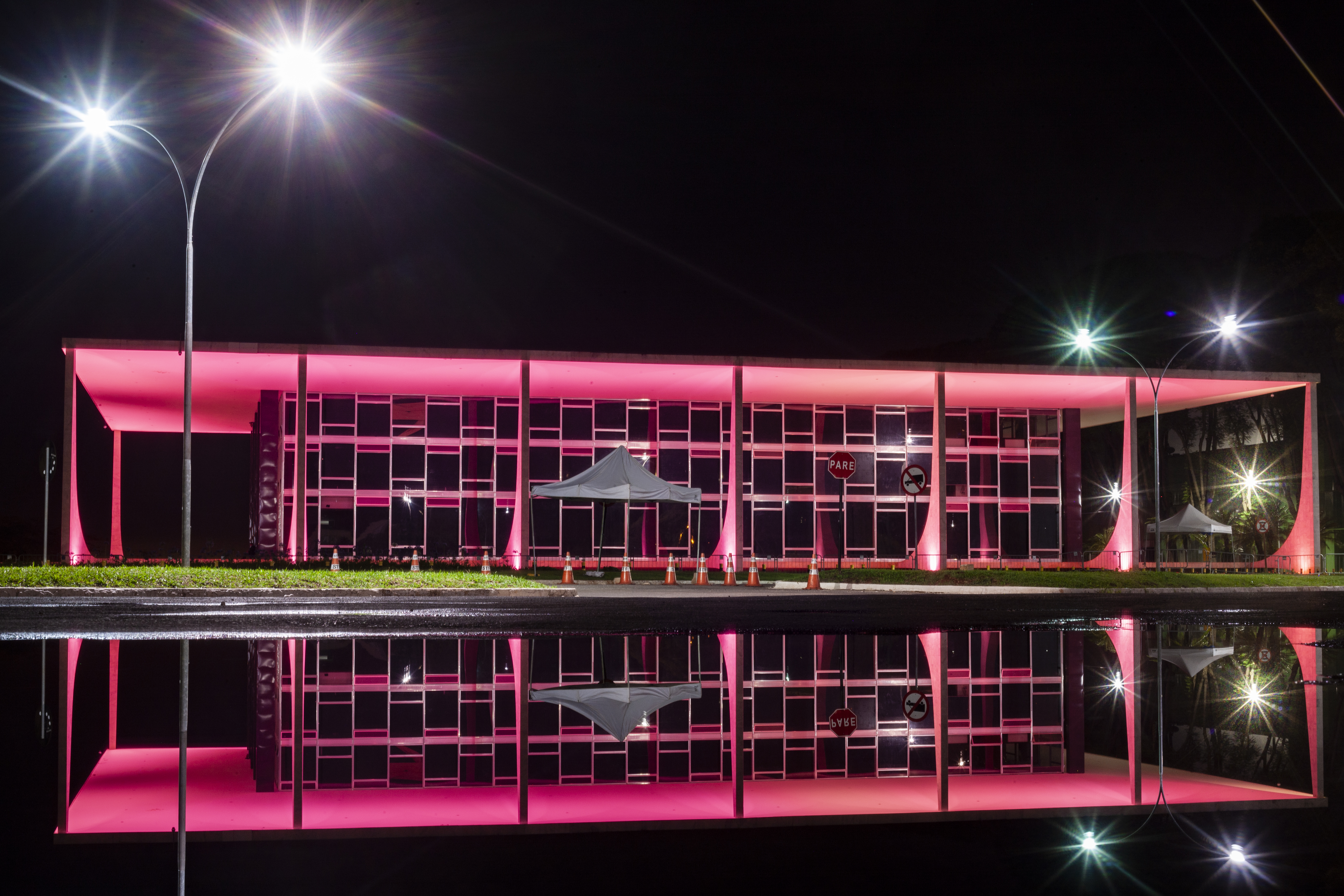
The Supreme Court lit up in pink for Breast Cancer Awareness Month on 29 October 2020

== See also ==
- Brazil federal courts
- List of ministers of the Supreme Federal Court (Brazil)
- Tribunal de Justiça
