= Desembargador =

Appellate judge in the Portuguese legal tradition

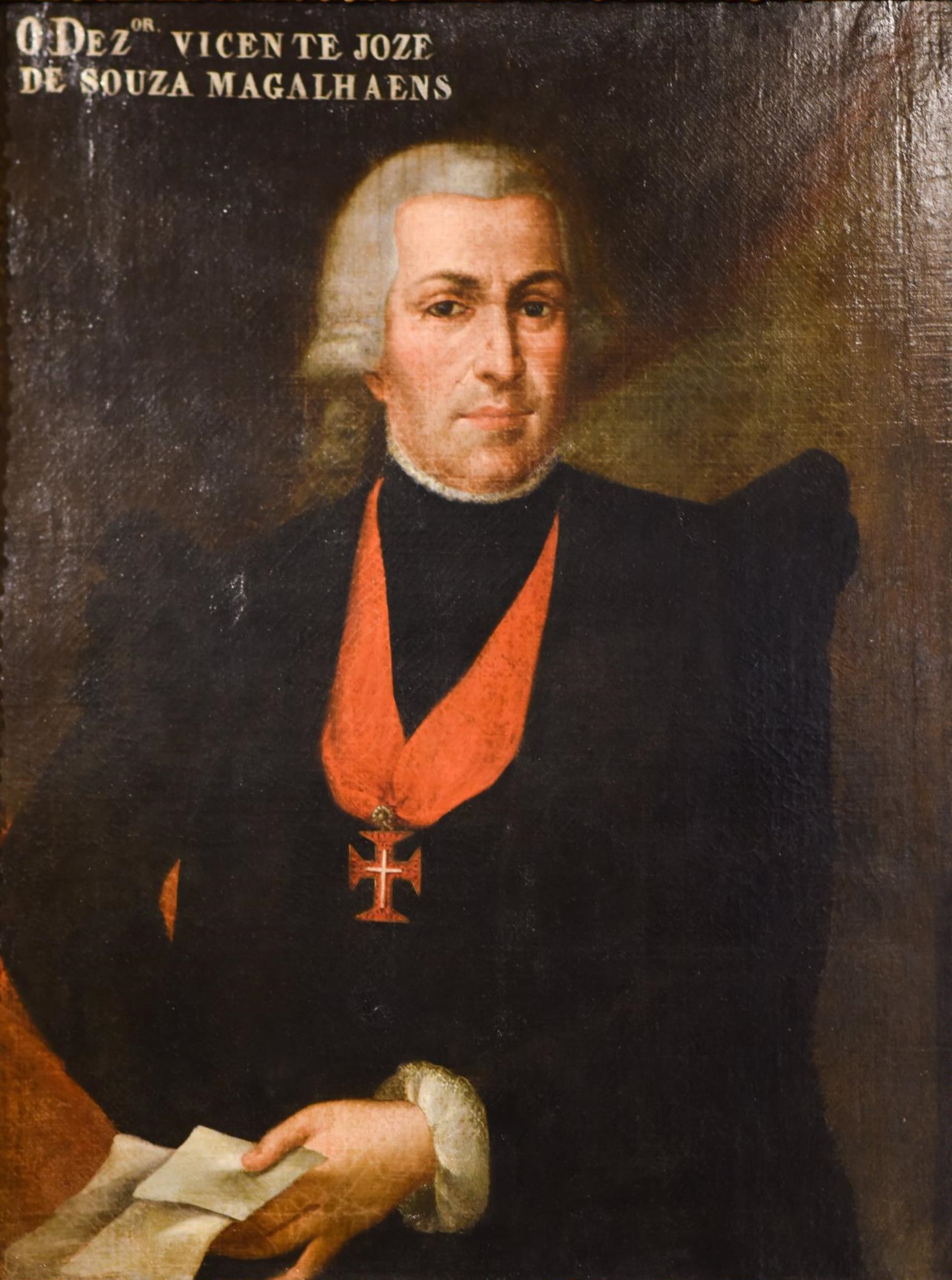
Portrait of an 18th-century Portuguese desembargador, Vicente José de Sousa Magalhães

Desembargador is a Portuguese title given to some appellate judges in Portugal, Brazil and other countries influenced by the Portuguese legal tradition.

== History ==
Historically, the title desembargador was given to the judges of some of the higher courts of the Kingdom of Portugal and, later, of the Portuguese Empire. Desembargadores were judges of the Desembargo do Paço (supreme court), of the House of Supplication (court of appeal for the southern provinces of the Kingdom) and of the several courts of relação (regional courts of appeal). The first Relação court was created in Porto by the transformation of the former Civil House court. Additional relações were later created after in the Portuguese overseas cities of Goa (1544), Salvador da Bahia (1609), Rio de Janeiro (1751), São Luís do Maranhão (1812) and Recife (1821).

After the independence of Brazil was won from Portugal in 1822, the title continued to be applied in both countries and in the remaining parts of the Portuguese Empire to the judges of certain courts of appeal.

== Present ==
=== Brazil ===
The Brazilian Constitution of 1988 defines desembargadores as the judges of the Courts of Justice, which are appellate courts of the state court system. Judges of the state first instance courts are called juízes de direito (judges of law).

In 2001, the Regional Federal Court of the 4th Region determined that judges of such courts should be called desembargadores, instead of simply juízes federais, or federal judges, which was the name of their office until then. It was followed by the Regional Labor Courts renaming their labor judges to desembargadores too. First instance federal judges/labor judges continued being called juízes federais/juízes do trabalho.

This determination was criticized by the federal judge Julio Guilherme Schattschneider, who said that it was the equivalent to the President issuing a decree saying that they should be called Prime Minister. He said that the Court gave a bad example because its determination was unconstitutional, given that the Constitution determines that all federal judges, regardless of being appellate court judges or not, be called juízes.

=== Portugal ===
With the reform of the Justice system in the early 1830s, following the establishment of the Constitutional Monarchy in Portugal, the title juíz desembargador or simply desembargador became reserved only for the judges of the courts of relação. Presently, there are five of those courts, one each in the cities of Porto, Lisbon, Coimbra, Évora and Guimarães. By comparison, the judges of first instance are titled juízes de direito (judges of law) and the judges of the Supreme Court of Justice are titled conselheiros (councilors).

The judges of the courts of administrative and tax jurisdiction have analogous titles and so those of the two regional central administrative courts (courts of appellate seated in Lisbon and Oporto) are also titled desembargadores.

== See also ==
- Law of Brazil
- Law of Portugal
