= Regional Federal Courts =

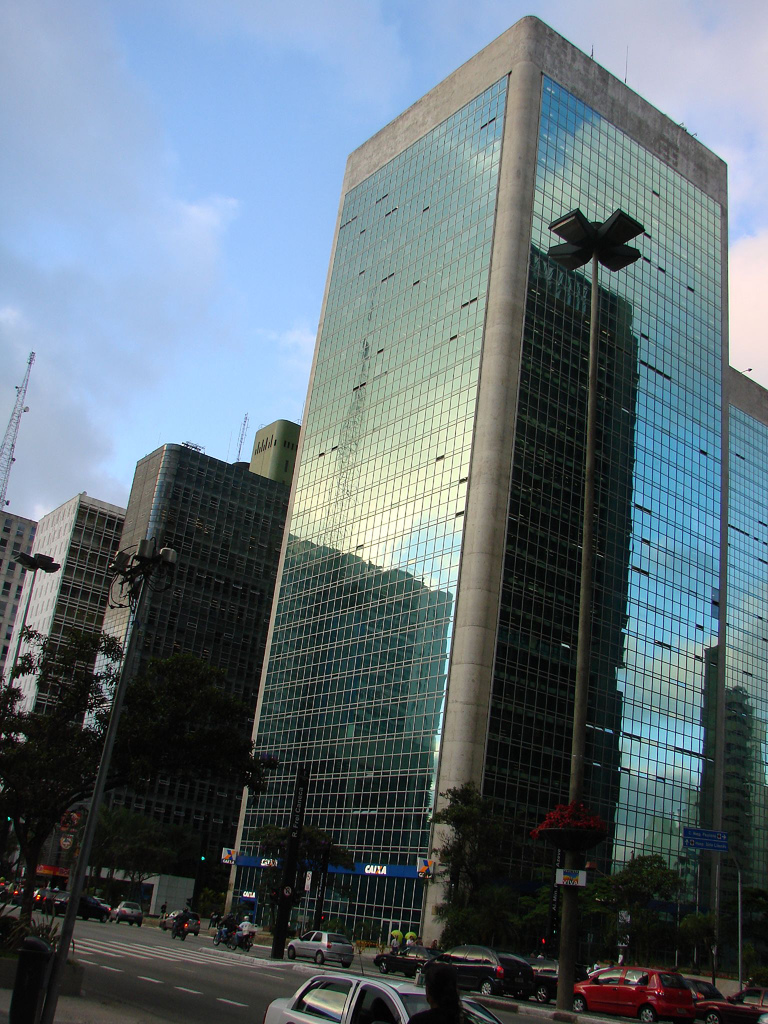
Headquarters of the Regional Federal Court for the Third Region, in São Paulo

The Regional Federal Courts (in Portuguese, Tribunais Regionais Federais, commonly called TRFs) are the courts of appeal in the Federal Courts of Brazil, the second instance courts of the Brazilian federal justice system, responsible not only for appeals of trial court decisions, but also for writs of security, habeas corpus, and habeas data against acts by federal judges, motions to set aside judgments, criminal revisions, and conflicts of jurisdiction.

Article 108 of the Brazilian Constitution defines the jurisdiction of the Federal Regional Courts.

They have a varied composition, but the number of judges is defined by law. One fifth are chosen by lawyers with 10 years experience or more, as well as by members of the Public Prosecutor's Office, also known as the "Federal Public Ministry" (Ministério Público Federal) with ten years experience or more. The rest of the judges are appointed through the promotion of federal judges with over five years experience, by longest service time and by merit, alternately.

In each tribunal is a Regional Office for Internal Affairs of Federal Justice (Corregedoria Regional da Justiça Federal), responsible for corrections, inspections, and investigations at first instance. The internal affairs offices are also in charge of hiring processes, and instruction towards a uniformization of jurisdictional activity and forensic service. They are each run by a regional director, with a possible vice-director.

== Federal Justice Regions ==
The Brazilian Federal Justice system is divided nationally into six geographically defined regions, each served by an appellate court:

- Regional Federal Court for the First Region — Tribunal Regional Federal da Primeira Região (TRF-1)
  - Seated in Brasília, Federal District, this appellate court covers the states of Acre, Amapá, Amazonas, Bahia, Goiás, Maranhão, Mato Grosso, Pará, Piauí, Rondônia, Roraima and Tocantins, as well as the Federal District.
- Regional Federal Court for the Second Region — Tribunal Regional Federal da Segunda Região (TRF-2)
  - Seated in Rio de Janeiro, Rio de Janeiro, this appellate court covers the states of Espírito Santo and Rio de Janeiro.
- Regional Federal Court for the Third Region — Tribunal Regional Federal da Terceira Região (TRF-3)
  - Seated in São Paulo, São Paulo, this appellate court covers the states of Mato Grosso do Sul and São Paulo.
- Regional Federal Court for the Fourth Region — Tribunal Regional Federal da Quarta Região (TRF-4)
  - Seated in Porto Alegre, Rio Grande do Sul, this appellate court covers the states of Paraná, Rio Grande do Sul and Santa Catarina.
- Regional Federal Court for the Fifth Region — Tribunal Regional Federal da Quinta Região (TRF-5)
  - Seated in Recife, Pernambuco, this appellate court covers the states of Alagoas, Ceará, Paraíba, Pernambuco, Rio Grande do Norte and Sergipe.
- Regional Federal Court of the Sixth Region — Tribunal Regional Federal da Sexta Região (TRF-6)
  - Seated in Belo Horizonte, Minas Gerais, this appellate court covers exclusively the state of State of Minas Gerais.

== New courts ==
The geographical jurisdictions of the Brazilian Regional Federal Courts:
Regional Federal Court of the 1st Region
Regional Federal Court of the 2nd Region
Regional Federal Court of the 3d Region
Regional Federal Court of the 4th Region
Regional Federal Court of the 5th Region
Regional Federal Court of the 6th Region

The creation of four new courts was approved by Congress by Constitutional Amendment number 73/2013. However, the National Association of Federal Prosecutors proposed a direct action of unconstitutionality against the creation of new courts; The former president of the Supreme Federal Court, Minister Joaquim Barbosa, suspended the constitutional amendment until the fore-mentioned direct action is judged.

The new tribunals, whose installations have been suspended by the Supreme Federal Court, are planned as:

- TRF for the 6th Region – headquartered in Curitiba: would entail the jurisdictions of the following states: Santa Catarina and Paraná, currently linked to the TRF for the 4th Region, and Mato Grosso do Sul, previously linked to the TRF for the 3rd Region.
  - The Court was "recreated" by Federal Law nº14.226. However, it has jurisdiction only in Minas Gerais.
- TRF for the 7th Region - headquartered in Belo Horizonte: would entail the jurisdiction of Minas Gerais, previously linked to the TRF for the 1st Region.
- TRF for the 8th Region - headquartered in Salvador: would entail the jurisdiction of Bahia, previously linked to the TRF for the 1st Region, and Sergipe, previously linked to the TRF for the 5th Region.
- TRF for the 9th Region - headquartered in Manaus: would entail the jurisdictions of the following states: Amazonas, Acre, Rondônia and Roraima, all previously linked to the TRF for the 1st Region.

== In relation to other courts ==
The 92 courts of the Brazilian judiciary
	State		Federal	
Superior courts		0	Supreme Federal Court; STF	1
Superior courts		0	Federal superior courts STJ TSE TST STM	4
Common justice	Court of Justice; TJ	27	Regional Federal Courts; TRF1 .. TRF6	6
Specialized justice	Court of Military Justice	3	Electoral Justice Courts; TRE	27
Specialized justice	TJM	3	Regional Labor Courts; TRT	24
Total		30		62

== See also ==
- Federal institutions of Brazil
