= Superior Labor Court =

Brazilian Court for Labor Law Issues

- Tribunal Superior do Trabalho
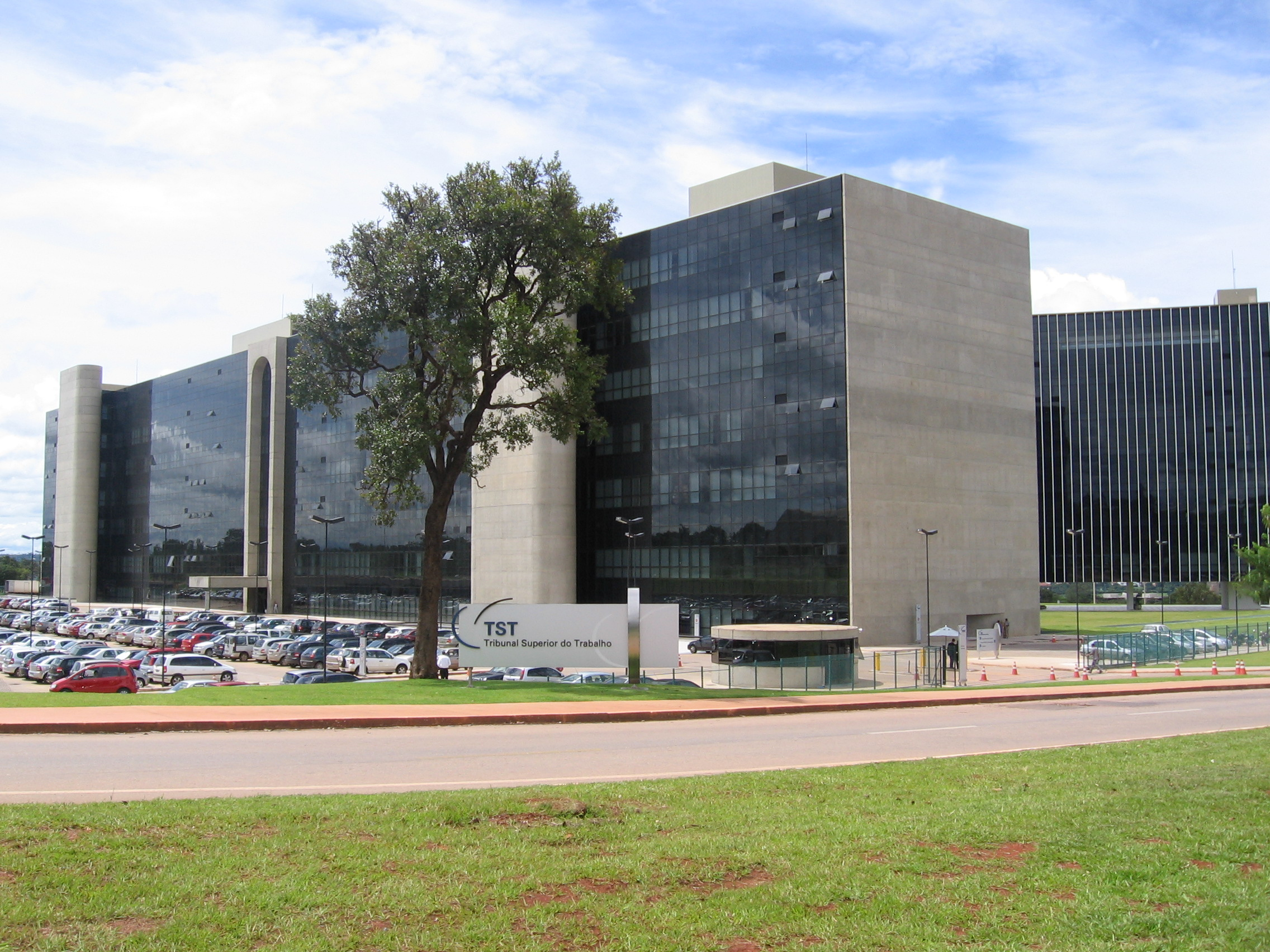
- Interactive map of Superior Labor Court
- 15°48′41″S 47°52′05″W
- Established: 18 September 1946; 79 years ago
- Location: Brasília, Federal District, Brazil
- Coordinates: 15°48′41″S 47°52′05″W
- Composition method: Presidential nomination with Senate confirmation
- Authorised by: Constitution of Brazil
- Appeals to: Supreme Federal Court
- Appeals from: Regional Labor Courts
- Judge term length: Life tenure (mandatory retirement at age 75)
- Number of positions: 26
- Website: www.tst.jus.br

President
- Currently: Lelio Bentes Corrêa
- Since: 13 October 2022

Vice President
- Currently: Aloysio Corrêa da Veiga
- Since: 13 October 2022

The Superior Labor Court (Portuguese: Tribunal Superior do Trabalho, TST), is the highest Brazilian appellate court for labor law issues. Its headquarters are located in Brasília, near the American Embassy.

It is one of the five high courts in Brazil, the highest instance in the Brazilian federalized labor courts system, which includes the Regional Labor Courts (Tribunais Regionais do Trabalho - TRT's), at common appeal level, and the Trial Labor Courts (Varas do Trabalho) in the first instance.

== History ==
The origin of the court was the National Labor Council, created in 1923, which was a part of the executive branch, subordinated to the Ministry of Agriculture, Industry and Commerce.

On 18 September 1946, the council was transformed into the Tribunal Superior do Trabalho. The Brazilian Constitution adopted that year recognized the TST as part of the judiciary branch, no longer subordinated to the executive. That status was retained by all subsequent constitutions.

Since its origins, the court was integrated by both effective Ministers and temporary class Ministers. The effective Ministers (nicknamed "togados" after the distinctive robes - "togas" - which they wear) were considered magistrates for all legal prerogatives, while the Temporary Classist Ministers ("classistas"), paritary representatives of both employers and employees ("classes"), were appointed for a fixed term (usually three years) and had fewer powers and prerogatives. The classist ministers were abolished by a constitutional amendment in 1999, leaving only the effective ministers.

== Composition ==
By the actual legislation, the Court is integrated by 27 members, entitled Ministers (Ministros), pointed by the President of Brazil. The nomination only occurs after the approval of the Senate. All the nominated members must be at least 35 and no more than 65 years old, must have Brazilian nationality and moral integrity, plus all the requirements to enter in a public service career (e.g. having fulfilled military conscription and electoral duties).

There are three positions reserved for lawyers, indicated by the Order of Attorneys of Brazil (the official Bar association), three for members of the Public Ministry, and the remaining 21 for career judges of the Regional Labor Courts.

== In relation to other courts ==
The 92 courts of the Brazilian judiciary
	State		Federal	
Superior courts		0	Supreme Federal Court; STF	1
Superior courts		0	Federal superior courts STJ TSE TST STM	4
Common justice	Court of Justice; TJ	27	Federal Regional Courts; TRF1 .. TRF6	6
Specialized justice	Court of Military Justice	3	Electoral Justice Courts; TRE	27
Specialized justice	TJM	3	Regional Labor Courts; TRT	24
Total		30		62

== See also ==
- Brazil federal courts
