= Tribunal de Justiça do Estado de Sergipe =

The Court of Justice of the State of Sergipe, headquartered in Brazil and with jurisdiction throughout the state, is the highest court of the Judiciary and consists of thirteen judges four different bodies: Full Court, Council of Magistrates, Civil Court and Criminal Chamber. A fifth of the seats of the Court of Justice are filled by prosecutors. The Court is presided over by one of its members, elected for two years, and two other judges elected on the same occasion.

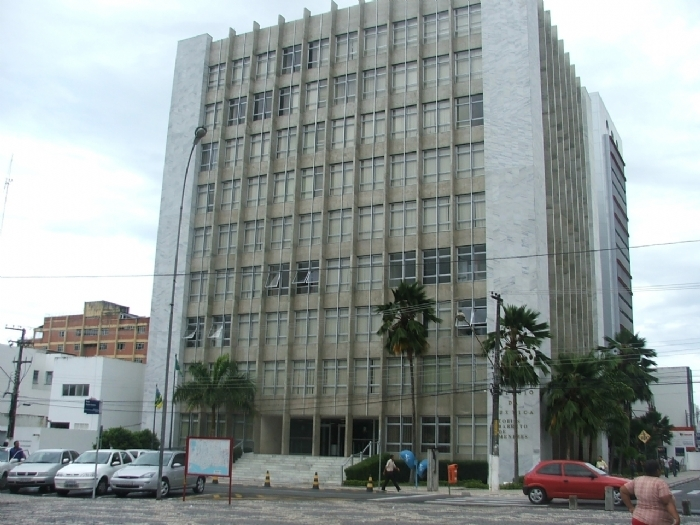
Palácio Tobias Barreto

== Composition ==
1. Luiz Antônio Araújo Mendonça
2. José dos Anjos
3. Ricardo Múcio Santana de Abreu Lima
4. Roberto Eugenio da Fonseca Porto
5. Cezário Siqueira Neto
6. Osório de Araújo Ramos Filho
7. Edson Ulisses de Melo
8. Ruy Pinheiro da Silva
9. Iolanda Santos Guimarães
10. Alberto Romeu Gouveia Leite
11. Elvira Maria de Almeida Silva
12. Diógenes Barreto
