= Superior Court of Justice (Brazil) =

Highest body of the Judiciary in Brazil

- Superior Tribunal de Justiça
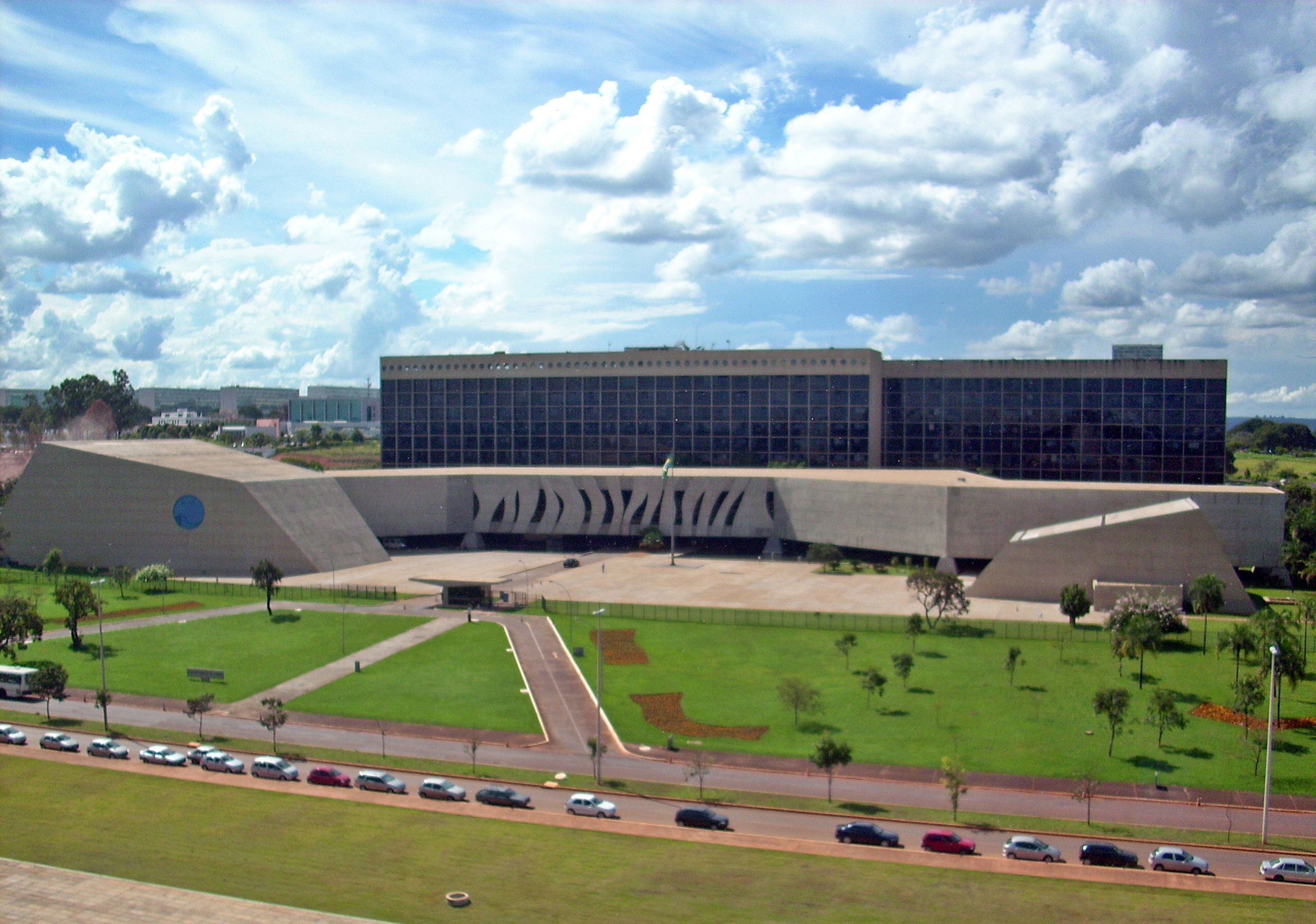
- STJ headquarters in Brasília

- STJ logo
- Interactive map of Superior Court of Justice
- 15°48′30″S 47°52′02″W
- Established: 7 April 1989; 37 years ago
- Location: Brasília, Federal District, Brazil
- Coordinates: 15°48′30″S 47°52′02″W
- Composition method: Presidential nomination with Senate confirmation
- Authorised by: Constitution of Brazil
- Appeals to: Supreme Federal Court
- Appeals from: State Courts of Justice
- Judge term length: Life tenure (mandatory retirement at age 75)
- Number of positions: 33
- Website: www.stj.jus.br

President
- Currently: Herman Benjamin
- Since: 22 August 2024

Vice President
- Currently: Luis Felipe Salomão
- Since: 22 August 2024

The Superior Court of Justice (Portuguese: Superior Tribunal de Justiça, also known as STJ, IPA: [ˌɛsiteˈʒɔtɐ]) is the highest appellate court in Brazil for non-constitutional issues regarding federal law. The STJ also has original jurisdiction over some cases. Its jurisdiction is provided for in Article 105 of the Brazilian Constitution.

A Special Appeal (in Portuguese, Recurso Especial) can be made to this court when a judgement by any of the country's appellate courts goes against a federal statutory provision or when said courts have issued different interpretations of the same federal statute.

By rule, the STJ decides only issues of law, and does not analyze any factual issues pertaining the cases' probatory elements, about which the appellate courts give the last word.

As in other superior courts in Brazil, STJ's justices are called "ministers" (Portuguese: ministros), not to be confused with ministers from the executive branch.

== History ==
Prior to late 1988, Brazil had only the Supreme Federal Court (Portuguese: Supremo Tribunal Federal, STF) as the Court of last resort, which would hear all highest appeals of mostly any matters, including other Higher, National Courts. As demand on the Judiciary was becoming intense, with a growing number of suits and cases, largely the result of the accessibility generated by the multiplication of first instance Courts, the STF found itself in a critical situation of unmanageable volume of service, urging for a correcting measure.

As the National Constitution Assembly started in 1987, one of the earliest projects to be included and eventually approved was the creation of a new National Court, in parallel with the already existing Superior Labour, Military and Electoral Tribunals, placing the STF on a higher degree. It was the beginning of the Superior Court of Justice (STJ), to which were transferred most of the issues then heard by the STF.

The STJ was physically placed in the building previously occupied by the Federal Court of Appeals (Portuguese: Tribunal Federal de Recursos [tɾibuˈnaw fedeˈɾaw dʒi ʁeˈkuʁsus], also called TFR, IPA: [ˌteɛʁiˈɛfi] or [ˌtjɛʁiˈɛfi]). The TFR was a stand-alone Tribunal mainly designed to hear all ordinary appeals from decisions by Federal Judges. Although having a parallel jurisdiction to second-instance State Courts, its judges were called "Ministers", denomination given to Justices from higher Courts. It was extinguished by the 1988 Constitution, which distributed all its competence to the new Federal Regional Courts (a total of five, placed around the national territory), with the Ministers from the TFR becoming the initial Justices of the STJ.

The Superior Court of Justice had its competence slightly altered by Amendment 45/2004, which transferred to the Court cases like the homologation of foreign court orders.

== In relation to other courts ==
The 92 courts of the Brazilian judiciary
	State		Federal	
Superior courts		0	Supreme Federal Court; STF	1
Superior courts		0	Federal superior courts STJ TSE TST STM	4
Common justice	Court of Justice; TJ	27	Federal Regional Courts; TRF1 .. TRF6	6
Specialized justice	Court of Military Justice	3	Electoral Justice Courts; TRE	27
Specialized justice	TJM	3	Regional Labor Courts; TRT	24
Total		30		62

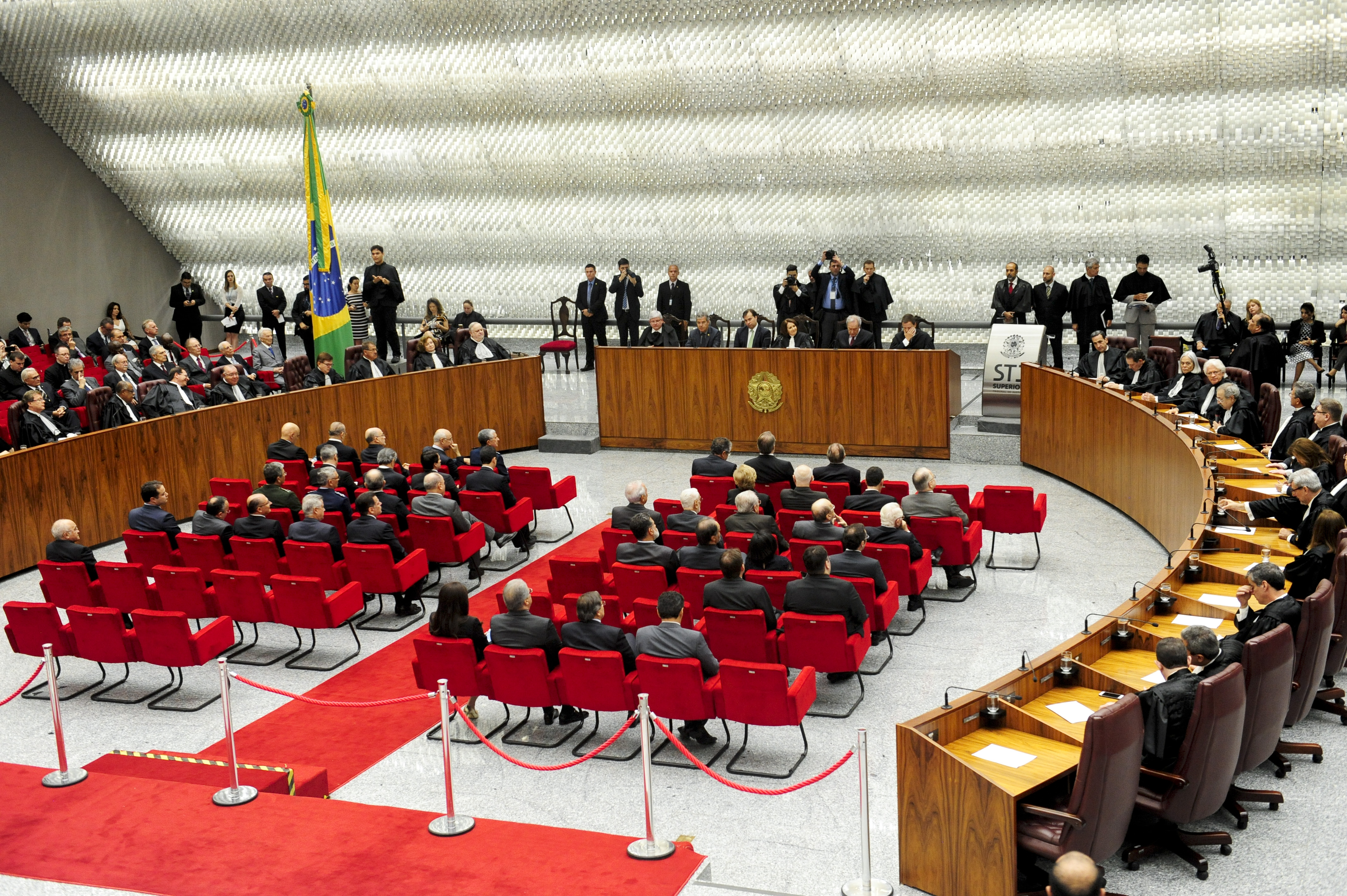
The courtroom

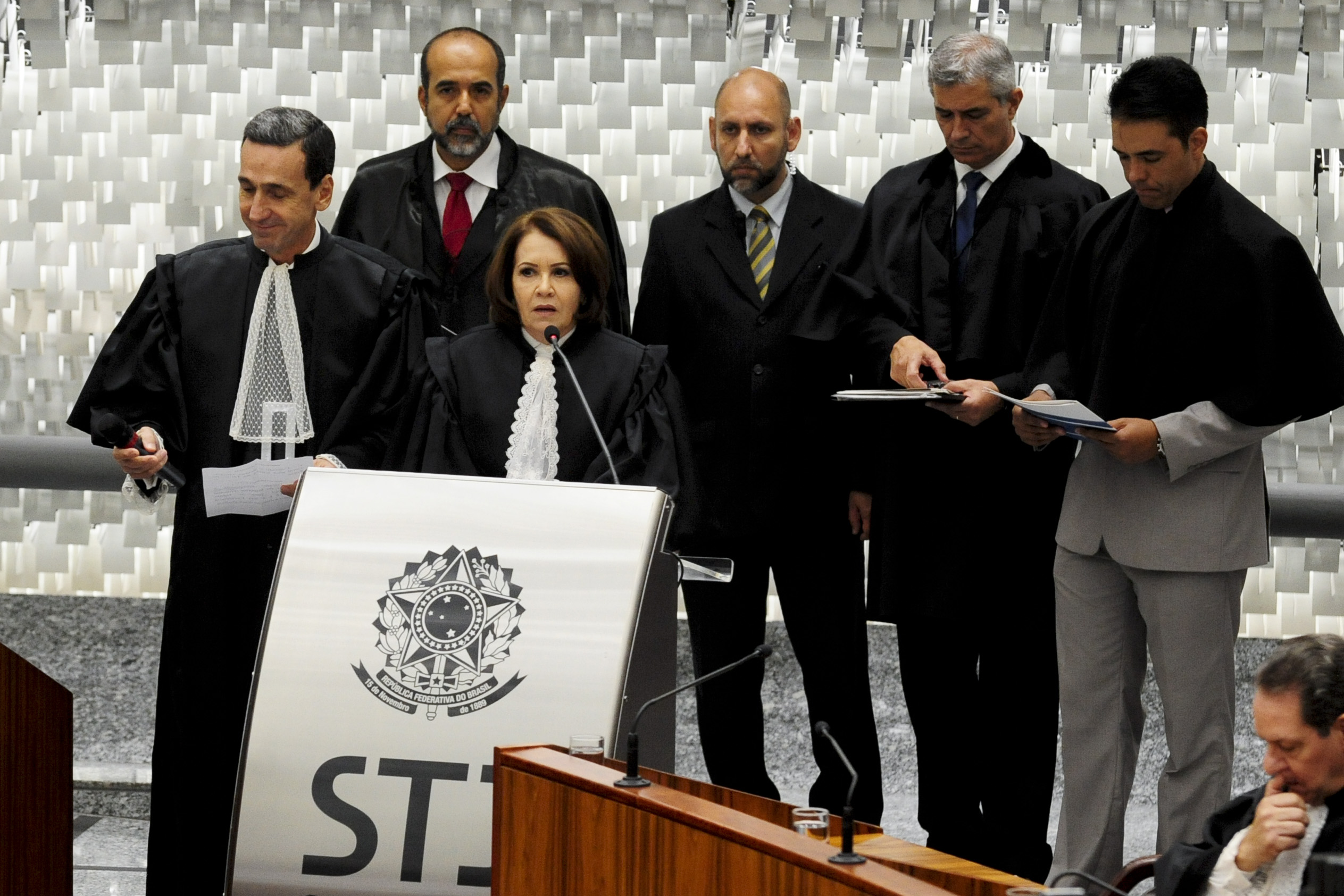
Inauguration ceremony of minister Laurita Vaz

== See also ==
- Brazil federal courts
