= Brazilian Public Service =

The Brazilian Federal Public Service is regulated by the Federal Law 8112, which established the Single Legal Scheme (Regime Juridico Único, RJU). There are two categories of servants, the effectives and the commissioned.

== Appliance ==
The candidates to the effective civil service must apply to a written examination called "Concurso Público" (or Public Service Entrance Exam). Practical examinations and the presentation of academic degrees and other documentation may also be required in some Entrance Exam. The candidates are classified according to the final grades, whose calculation is generally the average of the grades of each written exam (generally Portuguese Language, Mathematics, Computer Operation, Logical Reasoning and Laws, besides other job-specific knowledge) and qualification examination (Points are attributed according to degrees and work experience). The applicants with the highest grades are then nominated, according to the number of vacancies available for the function. The remaining classified may be nominated when new vacancies became available (due to death, retirement, or voluntary termination). The Classificatory list is generally valid during 2 years, and may be extended for more 2 years. After the expiration, the candidates from the list cannot be nominated.

== Probational period and stability ==
After the nomination, the new civil servant is subjected to the probational period. For two years (usually; the period can vary depending on the organization or government branch), the servant is evaluated by the immediate chief twice a year. The grades may vary from 0 to 100 and must be 70 or higher for the servant be approved in the probation. After the period, the approved servant is considered stable (akin to tenure) and the non-approved are dismissed. A stable servant may not be dismissed, except due to judged sentence or disciplinary administrative processes.

== Commissioned servants ==
The commissioned servants are nominated by public authorities. The nominated may be effective public servants or any other citizen. The probational period and the stability are not applied to these servants.

== Public service in cities and states ==
The Public Civil Service in Brazilian states and cities is regulated by state and municipal laws, but adopt similar procedures.
