= Superior Electoral Court =

Highest body of the Brazilian Electoral Justice

- Tribunal Superior Eleitoral
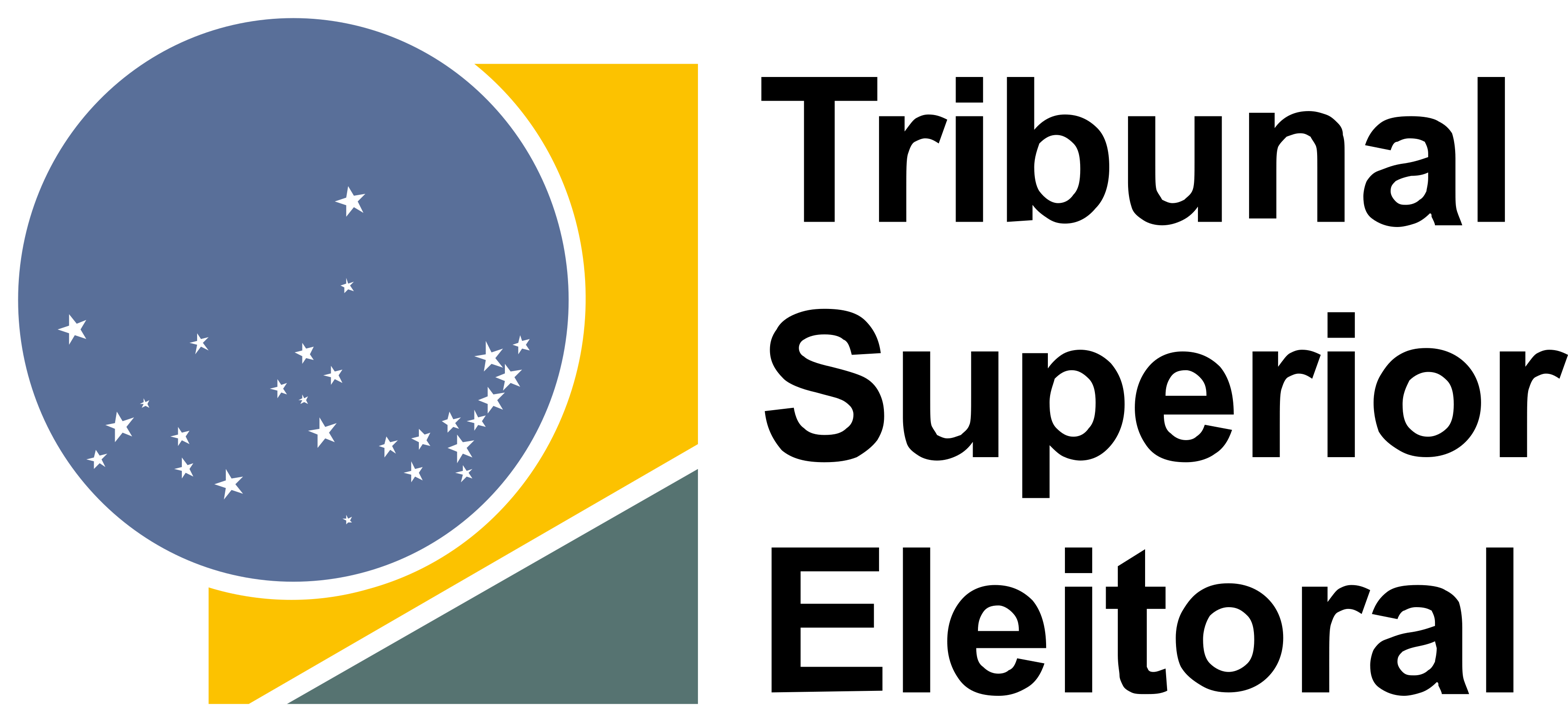

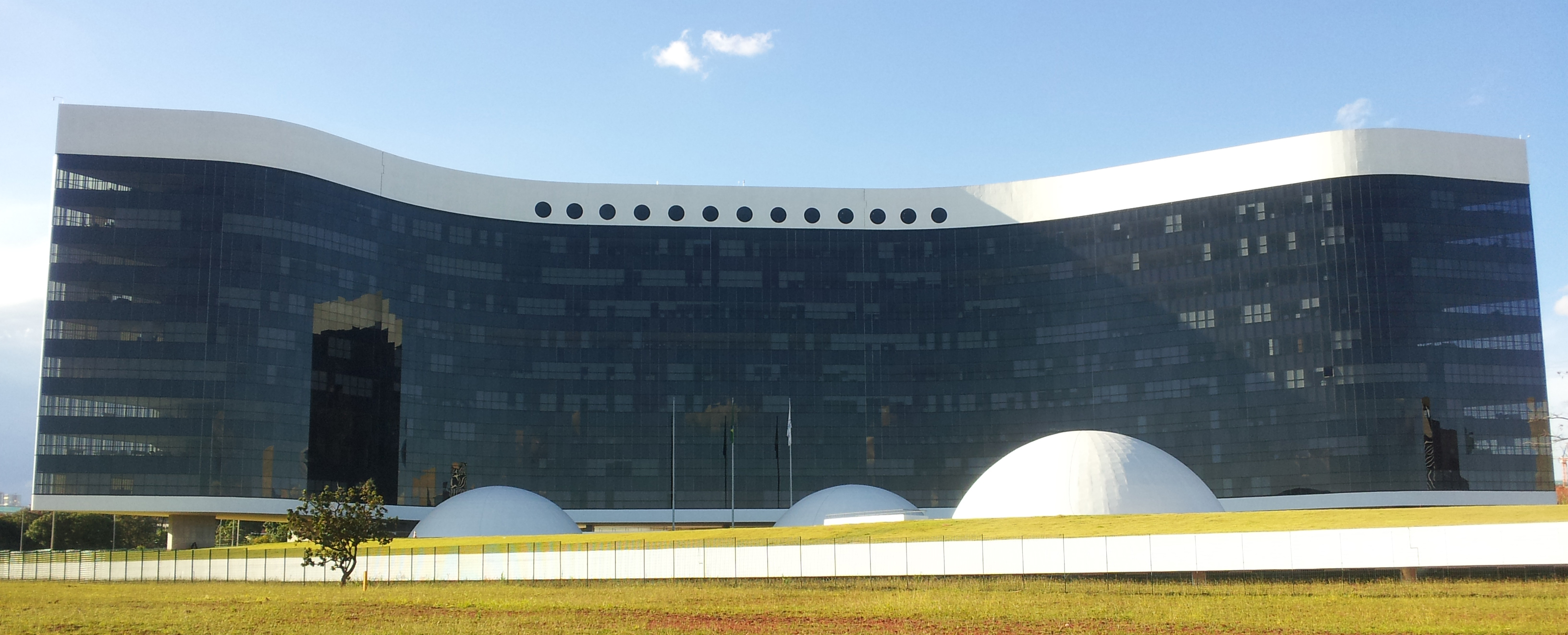
- The Superior Electoral Court building in Brasília
- Interactive map of Superior Electoral Court
- 15°48′37″S 47°52′18″W
- Established: 24 February 1932; 94 years ago
- Location: Brasília, Brazil
- Coordinates: 15°48′37″S 47°52′18″W
- Composition method: Election among members of the Supreme Federal Court and Superior Court of Justice
- Authorised by: Constitution of Brazil
- Appeals from: Regional Electoral Courts
- Judge term length: Two years, renewable once consecutively
- Number of positions: 7
- Website: www.tse.jus.br

President
- Currently: Nunes Marques
- Since: 12 May 2026

Vice President
- Currently: André Mendonça
- Since: 12 May 2026

The Superior Electoral Court (Brazilian Portuguese: Tribunal Superior Eleitoral, TSE) is the highest body of the Brazilian Electoral Justice, which also comprises one Regional Electoral Court (Brazilian Portuguese: Tribunal Regional Eleitoral, TRE) in each of the 26 states and the Federal District of the country, as determined by the Article 118 of the Constitution of Brazil.

== Background and legal provisions ==
The Brazilian Electoral Code of 1932 established the Electoral Justice in Brazil, replacing the political system conducted by the Legislative branch over the electoral proceedings. The new judicial system transferred control over such proceedings to the Judiciary. In the present, duties of the Electoral Justice are regulated by a posterior Electoral Code, approved in 1965 (Law No. 4.737/65), which revoked the 1932 code, but kept the judicial control over the electoral proceedings.

The Superior Electoral Court is the highest judicial body of the Brazilian Electoral Justice as per the §3 of the Article 121 of the Brazilian Constitution of 1988, which sets that the decisions of the TSE are unappealable, except those contrary to the Constitution, or that deny habeas corpus or writs of mandamus. Therefore, in such exceptions, the Supreme Federal Court (STF) determines appeals from TSE's rulings.

The composition of the TSE is ruled by the Article 119 of the Constitution of Brazil, which sets that the court shall be composed by seven members. Three of them shall be elected by secret vote from among the Justices of the STF and two other judges shall be elected by secret vote from among the Justices of the Superior Court of Justice (STJ). The remaining two shall be appointed by the President of Brazil from among six lawyers of notable juridical knowledge, and good moral reputation, nominated by the STF.

== Current composition ==
Name	Origin	Function
Effective Justices
Nunes Marques	STF	President
André Mendonça	STF	Vice President
Dias Toffoli	STF	
Antonio Carlos Ferreira	STJ	Corrigidor
Ricardo Villas Bôas Cueva	STJ	
Floriano Marques Neto	Jurist	
Estela Aranha	Jurist	
Substitute Justices
Gilmar Mendes	STF	
Dias Toffoli	STF	
Cristiano Zanin	STF	
Sebastião Reis Júnior	STJ	
Marco Aurélio Bellizze	STJ	
Vera Lúcia Santana	Jurist	
Vacant	Jurist	

== In relation to other courts ==
The 92 courts of the Brazilian judiciary
	State		Federal	
Superior courts		0	Supreme Federal Court; STF	1
Superior courts		0	Federal superior courts STJ TSE TST STM	4
Common justice	Court of Justice; TJ	27	Federal Regional Courts; TRF1 .. TRF6	6
Specialized justice	Court of Military Justice	3	Electoral Justice Courts; TRE	27
Specialized justice	TJM	3	Regional Labor Courts; TRT	24
Total		30		62
