= Regional Labor Courts =

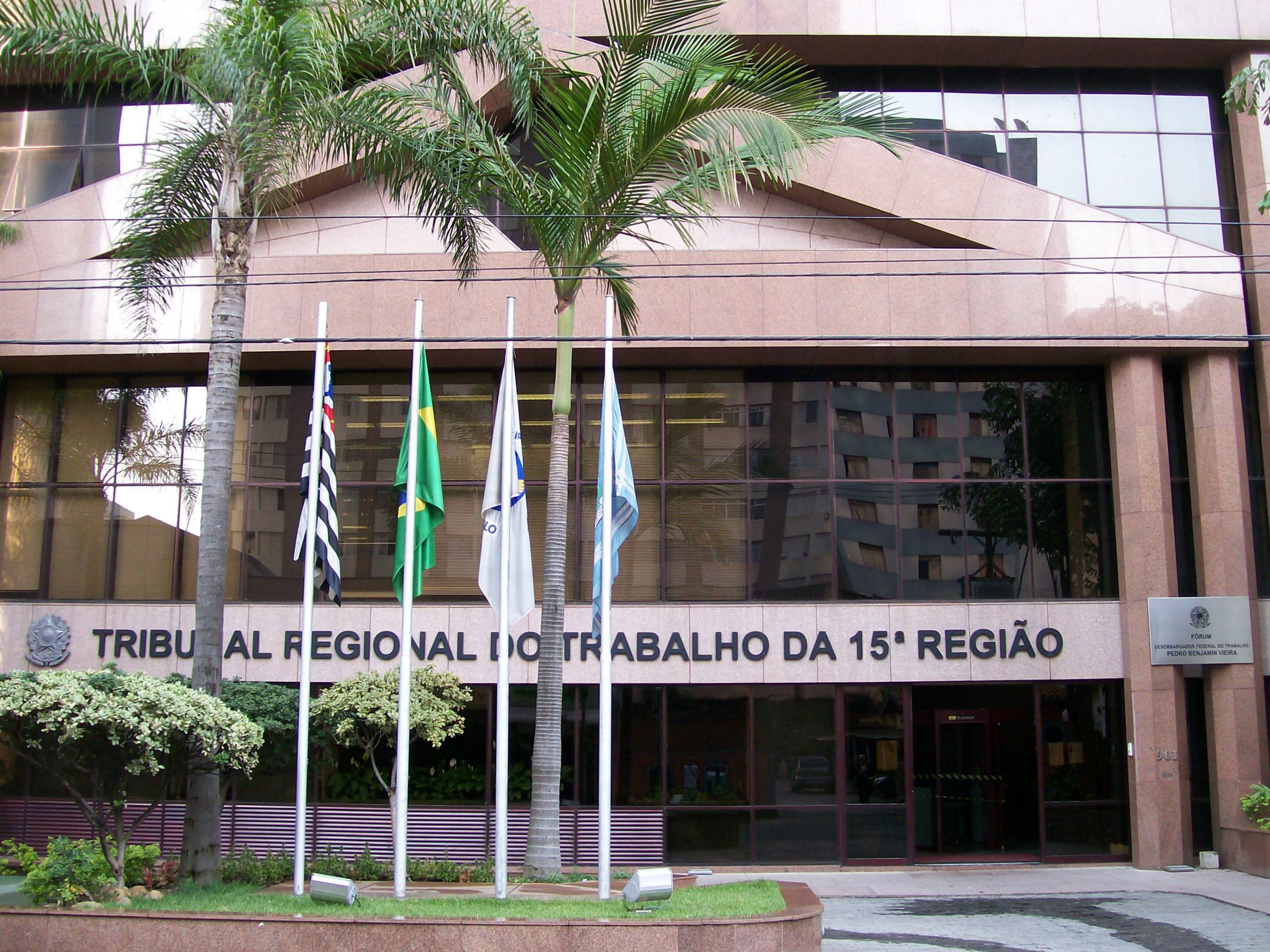
A Labour court in Campinas, Brazil

Regional Labor Courts (Portuguese: Tribunais Regionais do Trabalho) are Brazilian appellate courts of the Federal specialized court system for matters of labor law. There currently are 24 Regional Labor Courts, geographically defined by numbered Regions.

Regional Labor Courts of Brazil
Region	Jurisdiction	Headquarters	Judges (2009)	Foundation
1st	Rio de Janeiro state	Rio de Janeiro	54	1946
2nd	Greater São Paulo and Baixada Santista metropolitan areas	São Paulo	94	1946
3rd	Minas Gerais state	Belo Horizonte	36	1946
4th	Rio Grande do Sul state	Porto Alegre	36	1946
5th	Bahia state	Salvador	29	1946
6th	Pernambuco state	Recife	18	1946
7th	Ceará state	Fortaleza	14	1946
8th	Pará and Amapá states	Belém	23	1946
9th	Paraná state	Curitiba	28	1975
10th	Distrito Federal and Tocantins state	Brasília	17	1981
11th	Amazonas and Roraima states	Manaus	14	1981
12th	Santa Catarina state	Florianópolis	18	1981
13th	Paraíba state	João Pessoa	8	1985
14th	Rondônia and Acre states	Porto Velho	8	1986
15th	Municipalities of the State of São Paulo that are not included in the second region	Campinas	55	1986
16th	Maranhão state	São Luís	8	1988
17th	Espírito Santo state	Vitória	12	1989
18th	Goiás state	Goiânia	13	1989
19th	Alagoas state	Maceió	8	1991
20th	Sergipe state	Aracaju	8	1991
21st	Rio Grande do Norte state	Natal	8	1991
22nd	Piauí state	Teresina	8	1991
23rd	Mato Grosso state	Cuiabá	8	1992
24th	Mato Grosso do Sul state	Campo Grande	8	1992

== In relation to other courts ==
The 92 courts of the Brazilian judiciary
	State		Federal	
Superior courts		0	Supreme Federal Court; STF	1
Superior courts		0	Federal superior courts STJ TSE TST STM	4
Common justice	Court of Justice; TJ	27	Federal Regional Courts; TRF1 .. TRF6	6
Specialized justice	Court of Military Justice	3	Electoral Justice Courts; TRE	27
Specialized justice	TJM	3	Regional Labor Courts; TRT	24
Total		30		62
