= Court of Justice (Brazil) =

A court of Justice in Brazil (Portuguese: tribunal de Justiça; TJ) is any of the 27 appellate courts in Brazil, one per federative unit. It is body made up of second instance judges, called "desembargadores".

== See also ==
- Desembargador
- Judiciary of Brazil#Courts of Justice
- Tribunal de Justiça do Estado do Rio Grande do Norte
- Tribunal de Justiça do Estado de Sergipe
