= Brazilian Election Justice =

Legal code in Brazil

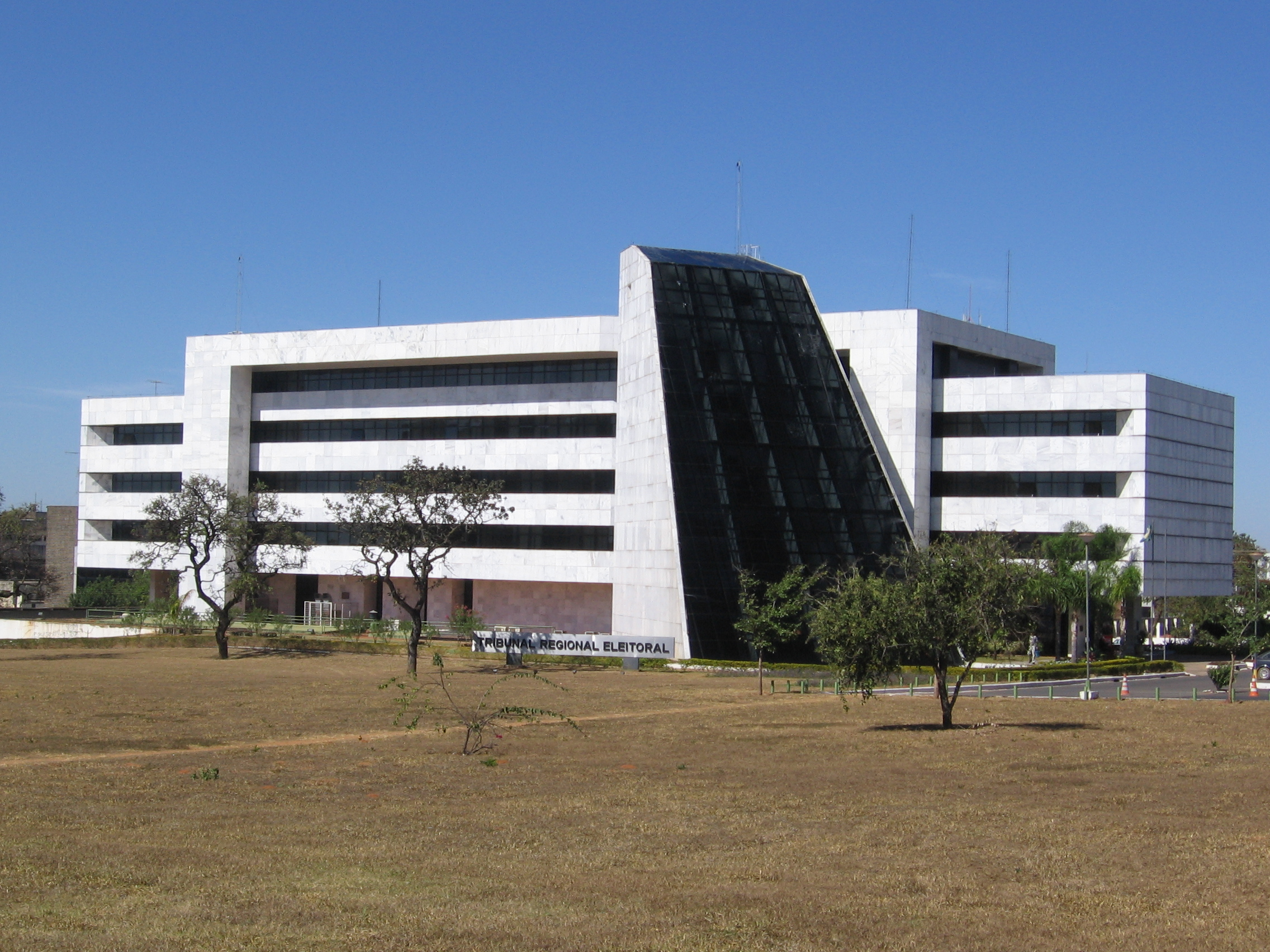

Coat of arms of the Federative Republic of Brasil

The Brazilian Election Justice (Portuguese: Justiça Eleitoral do Brasil) was created by Decree No. 21,076 of 24 February 1932, representing one of the innovations of the Revolution of 1930. In 1932 the first edited Brazilian election code was passed. It was inspired by the election justice of Czechoslovakia and the ideas of Joaquim Francisco de Assis Brasil, a politician, farmer and ambassador.

== Supporting law ==
Nowadays, the existence and regulation of the Election Justice in Brazil is determined in the articles 118 to 121 of the Federal Constitution of 1988, that established its exclusive attribution of the Federal Union legislating about election law.

The Election Code and other laws give executive and legislative powers to the Superior Electoral Court (TSE). The law, even if it is named to provide judicial powers, include an aggregation of administrative and normative functions as well.

== Comparative law ==
In other countries, the solutions adopted to distribution of powers in the election process differ from one country to the other. In Argentina and Finland the executive power itself administers the elections; In the United States, France and Germany, this role is played in city level; in Chile and Uruguay, there are independent organs, outside the public powers structure.

== Functions ==
The functions of Elections Justice are the following:

- Regulating the elections process
- Administration the elections process
- Inspecting the accomplishment of the law
- Inspecting the accounts of the elections campaigns
- Judging controversies about elections
- Punishing violations of elections law
- Answering queries about election regulation
- Judging appeals in election matters

== Bibliography ==
- Amaral, R.;Cunha, S.S. da. Manual das Eleições, 3ª ed.São Paulo: Saraiva, 2006, ISBN 9788502057401
- Anais do Seminário Brasileiro de Direito Eleitoral. Porto Alegre: Tribunal Regional Eleitoral do Rio Grande do Sul, 1990

== See also ==
- Elections in Brazil

== External sources ==
- Page of Tribunal Superior Eleitoral
- Page of Supremo Tribunal Federal
- Page of Conselho Nacional de Justiça
- Bibliografia sobre Direito Eleitoral Library of the Tribunal Superior Eleitoral
