= Tela Brasil =

Brazilian streaming video service

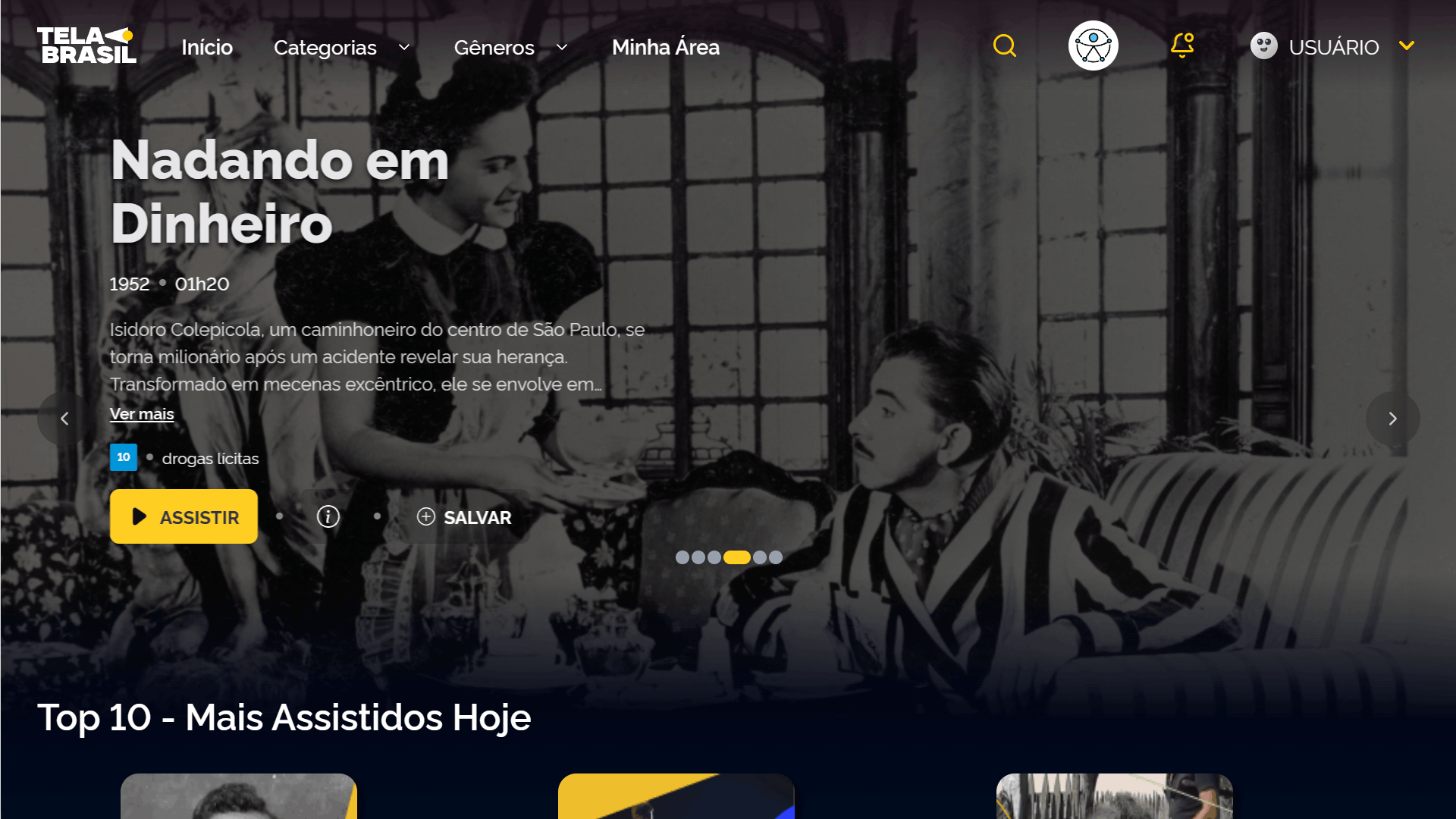
- Platform after logging in, featuring the film Nadando em Dinheiro (1952)
- Website type: OTT platform
- Available in: Brazilian Portuguese
- Headquarters: {{{location_country}}}
- Owner: Government of Brazil (2026–present)
- Industry: Entertainment
- Website: telabrasil.cultura.gov.br
- Advertising: No
- Commercial: No
- Registration: Required
- Users: 295 thousand (first week)
- Launched: 30 May 2026; 3 months ago
- Current status: Active

Tela Brasil (Note: lit. 'Brazil Screen') is the Brazilian public streaming platform of the country's Ministry of Culture; it first launched on 30 May 2026. It allows citizens of Brazil to watch over 500 Brazilian films free of charge, free of ads or behavior tracking.

== Background ==
=== Previous initiatives ===
In August 2018, Empresa Brasil de Comunicação (EBC) launched EBC Play, a free streaming platform available online and on mobile apps. It initially featured ten productions by TV Brasil, including documentaries and children's programming, and later that year would also platform the presidential candidates' debate. In August 2020, the platform was rebranded as TV Brasil Play and featured, alongside live TV Brasil programming, newly licensed works, such as the British TV series Sherlock.

In June 2022, the Minas Gerais state government launched EMCplay, (Note: "EMC" for Empresa Mineira de Comunicação (EMC; lit. 'Communication Company of Minas Gerais'), a state-owned media and communications company) rebranded in July 2024 as MINASplay, a free streaming platform for audiovisual works that were either made by Minas Gerais-born artists, or relating to the state in some way.

=== Development ===
The platform was developed by around 80 researchers, students, technicians and developers of the Federal University of Alagoas in partnership with other universities around the country. It reportedly cost R$9 million (approx. US$1.8 million) to build, between project management, technological development and content licensing. It is hosted by Serpro.

== Platform ==
=== Launch ===
The platform was launched during the 2026 edition of the Rio Creative Conference (Rio2C) event, hosted at Cidade das Artes, in Rio de Janeiro, Brazil. At launch, it featured 555 Brazilian motion pictures made from 1910 through 2025. Among those, 267 were short films, 139 feature-length films, 85 medium-length films and 64 were serialized works. Additionally, integration with TV Brasil is planned, aiming to add another 150 titles by the broadcaster.

Users are required to login using a gov.br account to access the service. A mobile app is also planned.

=== Profiles ===
The platform is divided into two profiles: a Citizen Profile (Perfil Cidadão) and a Directed Profile (Perfil Direcionado). The Citizen Profile is the one accessible to individual users, and works as other regular streaming platforms.

The Directed Profile, dubbed Rede Exibidora Tela Brasil (lit. 'screening network') is aimed at collective screenings, allowing for not-for-profit culture centers – e.g. libraries, museums, schools, festivals – to disseminate Brazilian works to the general public without licensing fees.

== Collection ==
The platform launched with over 500 Brazilian films in its collection. Among them are several Academy Awards nominees and winners, such as:

- Orfeu Negro (1959)
- O Quatrilho (1995)
- O Que É Isso, Companheiro? (1997)
- Carandiru (2003)
- O Menino e o Mundo (2013)
- O Sal da Terra (2014)

== Usage statistics ==
After less than a week of its launch, the platform had gathered over 295 thousand users, reaching 53 thousand simultaneous spectators at peak usage. The most watched films were A Hora da Estrela (1986), Deus e o Diabo na Terra do Sol (1964), Carandiru (2003), O Menino e O Mundo (2013) and O Que É Isso, Companheiro? (1997). In these initial days, the platform saw most of its users come from the states of São Paulo, Rio de Janeiro, Minas Gerais, Rio Grande do Sul and Bahia.

== See also ==
- MEC Livros
- JFF Theater, a similar service from Japan, made available worldwide
- Tubi
