= Dataprev =

Brazilian public company

Empresa de Tecnologia e Informações da Previdência
- Type: Public
- Industry: Information technology
- Founded: November 4, 1974; 51 years ago
- Headquarters: Brasília, Federal District; Brazil
- Key people: Rodrigo Assumpção (Chairman)
- Products: CNIS, Caged, SINE, Emprega Brasil, CTPS, CADPREV, SIPREV, Sigepe, PUC, CADPREVIC, SICADI, FUNPRESP
- Services: Software development, Data center and Telecommunications; Information and communications technology Consultancy
- Revenue: ▲ R$ 1.86 billion (2021)
- Net income: ▲ R$ 355.5 million 2021
- Number of employees: 2 895 (2021)
- Website: https://www.dataprev.gov.br/

The Empresa de Tecnologia e Informações da Previdência (English: Social Security Information and Technology Company), also known as Dataprev, is a Brazilian public company linked to the Ministry of Management and Innovation in Public Services (MGI). It is responsible for managing the Brazilian social database, particularly that of the National Social Security Institute (INSS). It was created in 1974 under Law 6.125.

The company's central administration is located in the Federal District. On January 8, 2020, its structure was reduced, with about 500 jobs cut and 20 state branches closed. Only the three data processing centers in the cities of Brasília, São Paulo and Rio de Janeiro and the five software development units in the cities of Florianópolis, Rio de Janeiro, Fortaleza, João Pessoa and Natal remain.

== History ==
In 1938, José Gomes de Pinho Neves installed the largest data processing equipment in Brazil at the Institute of Retirement and Pensions for Industrial Workers (IAPI) using punched cards to determine the granting and maintenance of benefits. On November 4, 1974, Law No. 6.125 created the Empresa de Processamento de Dados da Previdência Social, from the merger of the data processing centers of the social security institutes that had existed until 1964. Subsequently, its trade name was changed to Empresa de Tecnologia e Informações da Previdência Social, and modified again at the 14th Ordinary General Meeting (AGM) held on October 27, 2020, to Empresa de Tecnologia e Informações da Previdência.

In 1975, the contract between INPS and Burroughs Corporation was transferred to Dataprev, which began to manage the computer park installed in Rio de Janeiro and São Paulo. In 1989, Dataprev's first public tender was held, as required by the 1988 Constitution. In 1991, Prisma, the system responsible for the benefits functions at the Social Security Agencies (APS), was implemented in the Federal District. In 2006, the INSS 135 Call Center was launched, ending queues at the APSs. Software development units were created in João Pessoa (UDPB), Fortaleza (UDCE), Florianópolis (UDSC) and Rio de Janeiro (UDRJ). In 2011, the storage capacity of the processing centers reached 1 Petabyte.

In 2013, the data migration of the Federal Revenue Service and the Attorney General's Office of the National Treasury (PGFN) to a low platform was completed, involving ten large databases, 8.5 billion records, 12 large applications and the conversion of 3.4 million lines of code written in COBOL to Java. In January 2020, Serpro and Dataprev were included in the National Privatization Program (PND). However, the Public Prosecutor's Office issued a statement declaring that the privatization of Serpro contradicts the General Personal Data Protection Law (LGPD) and threatens national security, as its databases would be outsourced.

== Features ==
Dataprev is a public company linked to the Ministry of Management and Innovation in Public Services (MGI), with legal status under private law, its own assets and administrative and financial autonomy. Its share capital is distributed between the Federal Government, with 51%, and the National Social Security Institute (INSS), with 49%. The main services currently provided by Dataprev are business intelligence, operations and support, development, hosting and cloud, consultancy, open data and e-mail.

== Structure ==
The company has three data centers located in the cities of Rio de Janeiro, São Paulo and Brasília, and five development units spread over Fortaleza, João Pessoa, Natal, Rio de Janeiro and Florianópolis.

=== Data centers ===
- Brasília Data Center - DCDF (257 m^{2});
- Rio de Janeiro Data Center - DCRJ (with 1028 m^{2});
- São Paulo Data Center - DCSP (with 384 m^{2}).

==== Processing capacity ====
- RISC: 58 tFLOPS/s;
- X86: 1.028 tFLOPS/s;
- Mainframe: 154.305 RPM;

==== Storage capacity ====
- +10 Petabytes.

=== Main clients ===
- Ministry of Citizenship;
- Ministry of Finance;
- Brazilian Space Agency (Agência Espacial Brasileira - AEB);
- National Land Transport Agency (Agência Nacional de Transportes Terrestres - ANTT);
- Special Department of Federal Revenue of Brazil (Secretaria Especial da Receita Federal do Brasil - RFB;
- National Social Security Institute (Instituto Nacional do Seguro Social - INSS);
- Attorney General Office of The National Treasury (Procuradoria-Geral da Fazenda Nacional - PGFN);
- National Superintendence for Pension Funds (Superintendência Nacional de Previdência Complementar - Previc);
- Clearing House Interbank (Câmara Interbancária de Pagamentos - CIP);
- São Paulo City Hall;
- Financial institutions (public and private).

== See also ==
- List of Brazilian government enterprises
- Social security in Brazil
