= CPRM (disambiguation) =

CPRM is Content Protection for Recordable Media.

CPRM may also refer to:

- Communist Party of Revolutionary Marxists
- Companhia Portuguesa de Rádio Marconi, a Portuguese postal, telegraph and telephone service
- Companhia de Pesquisa de Recursos Minerais, a Brazilian government enterprise
