= Conrado Wessel =

Argentine-born Brazilian inventor (1891–1993)

- Born: Ubaldo Conrado Augusto Wessel; 16 February 1891; Buenos Aires, Argentina
- Died: 23 May 1993 (aged 102)
- Occupations: Inventor, photographer, businessman
- Known for: Developing and patenting a formula for coating photographic paper

Ubaldo Conrado Augusto Wessel (16 February 1891 – 23 May 1993), commonly known as Conrado Wessel, was an Argentine-born Brazilian inventor, photographer, and businessman. He is best known for developing and patenting in Brazil a formula for coating photographic paper and for helping establish the country's photographic paper industry.

== Life and work ==
Wessel was born in Buenos Aires to German immigrant parents. He moved to Brazil with his family during childhood and later studied photography and photochemistry in Vienna. He also attended courses at the São Paulo Polytechnic School, where he carried out experiments with silver salts in an effort to improve photographic processes.

After years of experiments, Wessel patented in 1921 a formula for coating photographic paper. According to Pesquisa FAPESP, the formula improved the adhesion of the silver-salt emulsion to the paper base. He then began selling photographic paper and founded Fábrica Privilegiada de Papéis Fotográficos Wessel in São Paulo, described in later sources as Brazil's first photographic paper factory.

The Paulista Revolt of 1924 increased demand for Wessel's product. During the revolt, São Paulo was cut off from imported goods arriving through Rio de Janeiro, and photographers in the city turned to Wessel paper instead. After the revolt ended, his paper reportedly maintained its sales because of its quality.

Wessel later reached an agreement with Kodak, which acquired his production, and the patent was transferred in 1954.bet

== Legacy ==
Wessel never married and had no children. In his will, he left his estate for the creation of the Conrado Wessel Foundation, which was established on 20 May 1994, the year after his death, to support philanthropy and to promote art, science, and culture in Brazil.

The foundation later established the FCW prizes, which have recognized achievements in art, science, culture, medicine, and photography.
