= Social security rights of same-sex partners in Brazil =

The social security rights of same-sex partners in Brazil made significant progress in the first decade of the 21st century, especially after the INSS ( National Institute of Social Security) was compelled by the federal courts to administratively recognize certain social security rights nationwide. Although the court decision is being challenged by the INSS, it remains fully in effect.

Following this decision, several states and municipalities recognized, either through simple administrative regulations or by modifying the laws governing the matter, the right of their public employees to register their same-sex partners as beneficiaries of their legal pension schemes. Internal regulations of public and private companies have followed the same example in regulating their supplementary pension plans.

In matters of social security, the Federal Government is responsible for legislating on INSS benefits (for private sector workers) and the special pension scheme for its public servants. Social security benefits for state and municipal employees (where a special pension scheme exists for public servants) fall under the jurisdiction of the respective levels of government.

== Private sector workers ==
In 2000, the Federal Public Prosecutor's Office filed a public civil action with the 3rd Social Security Court of Porto Alegre requesting that the INSS ( Brazilian National Institute of Social Security) recognize the social security rights of same-sex partners. The presiding judge of the Federal Court immediately granted the request, issuing a preliminary injunction obligating the INSS to grant such benefits. The scope of the decision is national, benefiting same-sex couples anywhere in Brazil.

The INSS (Brazilian National Social Security Institute) appealed the decision, both to the Federal Regional Court of the 4th Region and directly to the Supreme Federal Court, without success in its attempt to suspend the decision. Subsequently, the judgment on the merits confirmed the terms of the preliminary injunction (maintaining the rights of homosexuals), and the INSS appealed. The appeal was also favorable to homosexuals, and the INSS filed a special appeal and an extraordinary appeal, which are still pending judgment before the Superior Court of Justice and the Supreme Federal Court.

To comply with the court order, the INSS (Brazilian National Social Security Institute) regulated, through a normative instruction, how a same-sex partner should prove this union. Currently, this regulation is found in articles 25; 45, §2; 322 and 335 of INSS Normative Instruction No. 45, of August 6, 2010.

=== Public civil action ===
The action originated from a complaint filed by the non-governmental organization Nuances on September 24, 1999, with the Federal Public Prosecutor's Office in Porto Alegre, alleging that the INSS (Brazilian National Institute of Social Security) was violating human rights, equality, and freedom of sexual expression by administratively denying pension applications to same-sex partners. An administrative procedure was then initiated by the Federal Public Prosecutor's Office, where the INSS superintendent confirmed the veracity of the complaint, stating that "the granting of these benefits is not due in cases of homosexual relationships." Based on these facts, federal prosecutors Paulo Gilberto Cogo Leivas and Marcelo Veiga Beckhausen filed a public civil action, requesting that the INSS begin to consider homosexual partners as preferred dependents of the same class as heterosexual partners, granting death pensions and imprisonment allowances, and issuing an administrative act to that effect.

The action was distributed on April 11, 2000, to the 3rd Federal Social Security Court of Porto Alegre, under the responsibility of substitute federal judge Simone Barbisan Fortes.

=== Guaranteed benefits ===
- survivor 's pension : in the event of the insured person's death, their same-sex partner is entitled to the pension, competing with other preferred dependents;
- Imprisonment allowance : the same benefit, granted to the homosexual partner in case of imprisonment of the insured person.

=== Conditions for granting the benefit ===
As determined in the court decision, proof of cohabitation is sufficient. This guidance was expressly included in paragraph 4 of article 52 of the aforementioned normative instruction:

For same-sex partners, only proof of cohabitation should be required, as stipulated in Public Civil Action No. 2000.71.00.009347-0.

Therefore, economic dependence on the partner is not required, and it is irrelevant for the granting of benefits whether or not the beneficiary has the economic means to support themselves without the income earned by the partner. This understanding also applies to partners of opposite sexes.

The same normative instruction provides ways to prove a relationship (for partners) or economic dependence, listing fifteen methods and also referring generically to "any others that may lead to the conviction of the fact to be proven".

=== Validity ===
The benefit began to be granted as of the entry into force of the injunction in Public Civil Action No. 2000.71.00.009347-0, in 2000. According to INSS regulations, its effects are retroactive to deaths and imprisonments that occurred from April 5, 1991, onwards.

Since the INSS (Brazilian National Social Security Institute) is still appealing the outcome of this action to the STJ (Superior Court of Justice) and the STF ( Supreme Federal Court) (after being defeated on the merits in both the first and second instances), any victory in a judicial appeal by the INSS could mean the suspension of benefits, as there would be no obligation to recognize them and no law requiring it to do so.

== Public servants ==
=== Federal ===
The recognition of pension rights for same-sex partners of federal public servants depends on a specific court decision; there is no generic law or court order that guarantees its recognition for everyone, regardless of legal action. However, case law has recognized such rights.

Similarly to the action in favor of INSS beneficiaries, the Federal Public Prosecutor's Office in Espírito Santo filed a public civil action in 2007 with the aim of obliging the Union to recognize the social security benefits of federal public servants. The action is being processed in the 5th Federal Civil Court of Vitória and the preliminary injunction was denied, on the grounds that there was no danger of delay. The case file has been ready for judgment since November 2008.

=== State and municipal ===
Within the framework of the state and municipal civil servants' own pension scheme, in recent years several laws have been passed guaranteeing equal benefits between partners regardless of gender opposition. Among the states and municipalities that already recognize these rights (some due to changes in specific law, others as a result of administrative rules established by the executive branch itself), the states of São Paulo and Paraná and the municipalities of Recife, Rio de Janeiro, Pelotas, João Pessoa, Belo Horizonte, Porto Alegre and Fortaleza can be cited . In the state of Rio de Janeiro, the law was passed, but the Court of Justice considered it unconstitutional (due to a procedural defect, i.e., it should have been proposed by the governor).

== Supplementary pension ==
Several companies, notably state-owned ones, have recognized the benefit for homosexual partners in their private pension plans, such as Petrobras, Radiobrás, Serpro, Banco do Brasil, Caixa Econômica Federal and BNDES .
