= BB Tecnologia e Serviços =

Brazilian information technology company

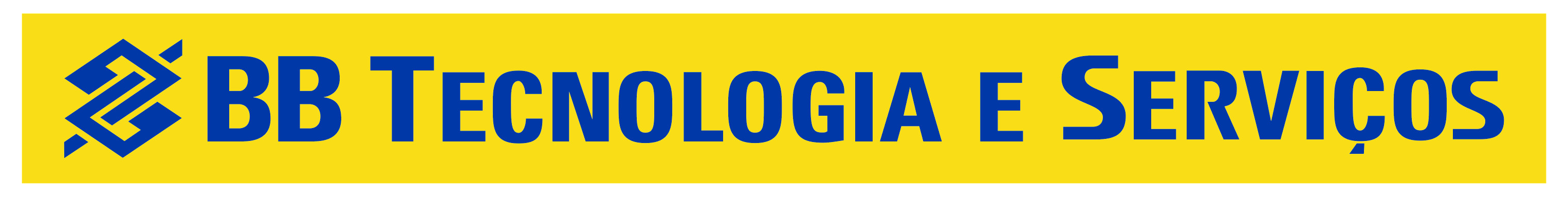
- Company type: Subsidiary
- Industry: Computer System; Software; IT service management
- Founded: July 18, 1974; 51 years ago (Computadores e Sistemas Brasileiros LTDA.) in Rio de Janeiro
- Founder: Federal government of Brazil; Sistemas Ferranti do Brasil; E.E Eletrônica
- Headquarters: Brasília, Brazil
- Key people: Herbert Bray; Ézio Távora; Cleofas Uchôa
- Products: Computer Monitors; Personal Computer; Laptops
- Number of employees: 4,000
- Parent: Banco do Brasil

BB Tecnologia e Serviços (BBTS), formerly Cobra Tecnologia, is a Brazilian information technology company that currently belongs to the Banco do Brasil conglomerate.

== Background ==
In 1961, students from the Instituto Tecnológico de Aeronáutica create the first computer project in national territory, which was called “Zezinho”.

Other universities begin to develop their own projects: Unicamp, with support from the Brazilian Navy, launches the "Projeto Cisne Branco". At the University of São Paulo, the Patinho Feio (in English: Ugly Little Duck) is developed. The name was a joke, because if the priority of the Military Government was the “Cisne Branco” (in English: White Swan), the USP project was the ugly duckling of the story. The fact is that the "Patinho Feio" was ready sooner.

Around the same time, the Navy buys six English frigates. The weapon systems of these modern warships were all computer-controlled. Mastering the technology became a matter of national security. The creators of the “Ugly Little Duck” were then hired by the Navy to develop a new computer, named G10.

== History ==
=== 1974-1976: Beginnings ===
Cobra (in Portuguese: Computadores e Sistemas Brasileiros) was created on July 18, 1974, in Rio de Janeiro, with the goal of developing genuinely national technology. The first computer factory would be the result of the union of the Navy, the BNDS, and the British factory Ferranti. The company's team was initially formed by professionals who came from the PUC-RJ, from USP, and from the SERPRO.

In the beginning, the company manufacturer the Cobra-700 was a licensed version of the Argus-700.

=== 1977-1989: Expansion and success ===
During late 1970s, more than half of the domestic computer market was already made up of products developed and manufactured in Brazil. Cobra stimulated the creation of several other companies, becoming the cornerstone of the computer sector in the country. In the same year they started importing their products to Argentina and Uruguay.

In 1979, the company returns to product development, in partnership with Sycor, launching the COBRA-400 microcomputer that used the Intel 8080.

In 1980 the Cobra-500 line computers were sold, a huge commercial success for that time. Other models were very successful in the rest of the decade, such as the Cobra-350, personal microcomputers the Cobra-300 and Cobra-310, the Cobra-1000 a computer for data processing, widely used by banking institutions.

=== 1990-2000: Decline and restructuring ===
Winner of the direct presidential elections, the Collor government passed a new IT Law, which represented a definitive opening of the Brazilian market, resulting in the closure of several factories and companies in the sector.

At the same time, the technological advances of the 90's and the popularization of the Internet made banks take a quality leap in the automation of their products and services: ATMs, magnetic cards, bar codes and Internet Banking came about. Following the market trend, Banco do Brasil acquires a majority stake in Cobra, which becomes a partner in the provision of technology services. Large contracts are signed, such as "Technical Assistance" and "Electronic Document Processing".

In 2005, Cobra signs a contract to provide specialized services in free software to Banco do Brasil. The company contributes to one of the world's largest migrations to open systems.

=== 2010–present: Post-merger ===
In 2013, it changed its fantasy name to BB Tecnologia e Serviços (BBTS), as a way to demonstrate to the market its proximity and alignment with its controller, Banco do Brasil, which holds 99.97% of its capital stock.

Today, BBTS has a diversified portfolio: Technical Assistance, Monitoring, Electronic Security, Contact Center, Logistic Support to banking services, Document Management, Printing, Software and Testing Factories, Free Software, Telecommunications Resource Management, and SMS gateway.

== Logo evolution ==
1974

1984

1990

2005

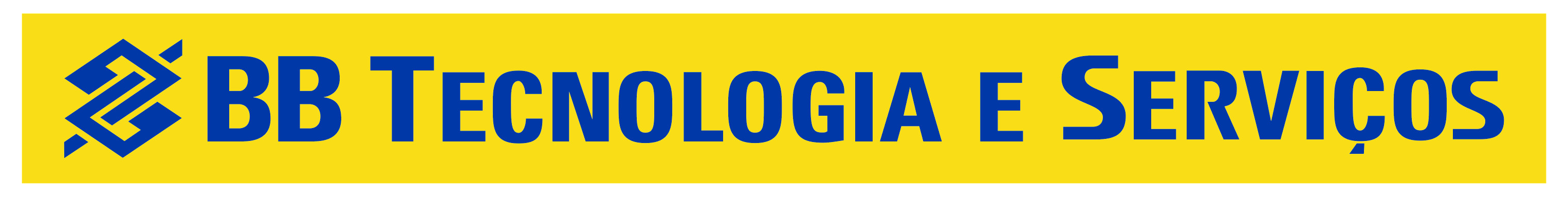
2013

== Bibliography ==
- Adler, Emanuel 1991 The power of ideology: the quest for technological autonomy in Argentina and Brazil Berkeley, University of California Press.
- Benakouche, Rabah (org.). 1985 A questão da informática no Brasil São Paulo, Brasiliense.
- Piragibe, Clélia 1985 Indústria da informática: desenvolvimento brasileiro e mundial Rio de Janeiro, Campus.
