= List of Brazilian government enterprises =

This is a list of Brazilian state-owned federal companies.

== Brazilian government enterprises ==
| Seq | Name | Acronym | Agency | Status | Creation | Est | Tranf |
|---|---|---|---|---|---|---|---|
| 1 | 5283 Participações Ltda. | 5283 PARTICIPAÇÕES | Ministério de Minas e Energia | PETROBRAS Group | 25/11/1999 | 25/11/1999 | |
| 2 | Amazônia Azul Tecnologias de Defesa S.A. | AMAZUL | Ministério da Defesa | Treasury dependent | 01/02/2013 | 16/08/2013 | |
| 3 | Brasilian American Merchant Bank | BAMB | Ministério da Fazenda | Bank of Brazil Group | 05/07/1973 | 26/02/1974 | |
| 4 | Banco do Brasil Agência Viena/Austria | BB AG | Ministério da Fazenda | Bank of Brazil Group | 28/01/1980 | 28/01/1980 | |
| 5 | BB Administradora de Cartões de Crédito S.A. | BB CARTÕES | Ministério da Fazenda | Bank of Brazil Group | 25/09/1987 | 29/09/1987 | |
| 6 | BB Administradora de Consórcios S.A. | BB CONSÓRCIOS | Ministério da Fazenda | Bank of Brazil Group | 12/12/2003 | 12/12/2003 | |
| 7 | BB COR Participações S.A. | BB COR | Ministério da Fazenda | Bank of Brazil Insurance Group | 17/12/2012 | 20/12/2012 | |
| 8 | BB Corretora de Seguros e Administradora de Bens S.A. | BB CORRETORA | Ministério da Fazenda | Bank of Brazil Insurance Group | 30/06/1987 | 30/06/1987 | |
| 9 | BB Gestão de Recursos Distribuidora de Títulos e Valores Mobiliários S.A. | BB DTVM | Ministério da Fazenda | Bank of Brazil Group | 15/05/1986 | 04/06/1986 | |
| 10 | BB ELO CARTÕES Participações S.A. | BB ELO CARTÕES | Ministério da Fazenda | Bank of Brazil Group | 24/05/2002 | 24/05/2002 | |
| 11 | BB Banco de Investimento S.A. | BB INVESTIMENTOS | Ministério da Fazenda | Bank of Brazil Group | 30/09/1988 | 03/10/1988 | |
| 12 | BB Leasing S.A. Arrendamento Mercantil | BB LAM | Ministério da Fazenda | Bank of Brazil Group | 03/04/1987 | 17/07/1987 | |
| 13 | BB Leasing Company Limited - Ilhas Cayman | BB LEASING | Ministério da Fazenda | Bank of Brazil Group | 17/12/1981 | 17/12/1981 | |
| 14 | BB Seguridade Participações S.A. | BB SEGURIDADE | Ministério da Fazenda | Bank of Brazil Insurance Group | 17/12/2012 | 20/12/2012 | |
| 15 | BB Seguros Participações S.A. | BB SEGUROS | Ministério da Fazenda | Bank of Brazil Insurance Group | 02/09/2009 | 02/09/2009 | |
| 16 | Bear Insurance Company Limited | BEAR | Ministério de Minas e Energia | PETROBRAS Group | 18/04/1997 | 22/04/1997 | |
| 17 | BESC Distribuidora de Títulos e Valores Mobiliários S.A. | BESCVAL | Ministério da Fazenda | Bank of Brazil Group | 03/05/1971 | 03/05/1971 | 30/08/2000 |
| 18 | Nossa Caixa Capitalização S.A. | BNC CAPITALIZAÇÃO | Ministério da Fazenda | Bank of Brazil Group | 03/08/2004 | 03/08/2004 | |
| 19 | BNDES Limited Londres/UK | BNDES LIMITED | Ministério do Desenvolvimento, Indústria e Comércio Exterior | BNDES Group | 18/02/2009 | 02/02/2009 | |
| 20 | BNDES Participações S.A. | BNDESPAR | Ministério do Desenvolvimento, Indústria e Comércio Exterior | BNDES Group | 29/06/1982 | 30/06/1982 | |
| 21 | Braspetro Oil Services Company | BRASOIL | Ministério de Minas e Energia | BRASPETRO Group | 28/01/1977 | 03/02/1977 | |
| 22 | Brasoil Oil Services Company Nigeria Limited | BRASOIL NIGERIA | Ministério de Minas e Energia | BRASPETRO Group | 30/09/1999 | 30/09/1999 | |
| 23 | Breitener Energética S.A. | BREITENER | Ministério de Minas e Energia | PETROBRAS Group | 13/12/2001 | 13/01/2001 | 12/02/2010 |
| 24 | Breitener Jaraqui S.A. | BREITENER JARAQUI | Ministério de Minas e Energia | PETROBRAS Group | 10/05/2005 | 10/05/2005 | |
| 25 | Breitener Tambaqui S.A. | BREITENER TAMBAQUI | Ministério de Minas e Energia | PETROBRAS Group | 10/05/2005 | 10/05/2005 | |
| 26 | Baixada Santista Energia Ltda. | BSE | Ministério de Minas e Energia | PETROBRAS Group | 23/03/1999 | 23/03/1999 | |
| 27 | Caixa Participações S.A. | CAIXAPAR | Ministério da Fazenda | C.E.F. Group | 28/10/2008 | 31/03/2009 | |
| 28 | Companhia Brasileira de Trens Urbanos | CBTU | Ministério das Cidades | Treasury dependent | 22/02/1984 | 15/03/1984 | |
| 29 | Centro Nacional de Tecnologia Eletrônica Avançada S.A. | CEITEC | Ministério da Ciência, Tecnologia e Inovação | Treasury dependent | 07/11/2008 | 15/04/2009 | |
| 30 | Cordoba Financial Services GmbH (Viena/Austria) | CFS | Ministério de Minas e Energia | PETROBRAS Group | 14/12/2005 | 14/12/2005 | 25/11/2008 |
| 31 | Companhia de Desenvolvimento dos Vales do São Francisco e do Parnaíba | CODEVASF | Ministério da Integração Nacional | Treasury dependent | 16/07/1974 | 22/10/1974 | |
| 32 | Companhia Nacional de Abastecimento | CONAB | Ministério da Agricultura, Pecuária e Abastecimento | Treasury dependent | 12/04/1990 | 19/12/1991 | |
| 33 | Hospital Nossa Senhora da Conceição S.A. | CONCEIÇÃO | Ministério da Saúde | Treasury dependent | 26/07/1960 | 26/07/1960 | |
| 34 | Companhia de Pesquisa de Recursos Minerais | CPRM | Ministério de Minas e Energia | Treasury dependent | 15/08/1969 | 08/01/1970 | |
| 35 | Companhia de Recuperação Secundária (Incorporated by Petrobrás) | CRSEC | Ministério de Minas e Energia | PETROBRAS Group | 01/06/2001 | 15/06/2012 | |
| 36 | Downstream Participações Ltda. | DOWNSTREAM | Ministério de Minas e Energia | PETROBRAS Group | 21/11/2000 | 21/11/2000 | |
| 37 | Empresa Brasil de Comunicação S.A | EBC | Presidência da República | Treasury dependent | 24/10/2007 | 31/10/2007 | |
| 38 | Empresa Brasileira de Serviços Hospitalares | EBSERH | Ministério da Educação | Treasury dependent | 15/12/2011 | 28/12/2011 | |
| 39 | Empresa Brasileira de Pesquisa Agropecuária | EMBRAPA | Ministério da Agricultura, Pecuária e Abastecimento | Treasury dependent | 07/12/1972 | 14/02/1975 | |
| 40 | Empresa de Pesquisa Energética | EPE | Ministério de Minas e Energia | Treasury dependent | 16/08/2004 | 16/08/2004 | |
| 41 | Petrobras Negócios Eletrônicos S.A. | e‐PETRO | Ministério de Minas e Energia | PETROBRAS Group | 12/04/2002 | 12/04/2002 | |
| 42 | Empresa de Planejamento e Logística S.A. | EPL | Ministério dos Transportes | Treasury dependent | 04/05/2012 | 08/08/2012 | |
| 43 | Estação Transmissora de Energia S.A. | ETE | Ministério de Minas e Energia | ELETROBRAS Group | 10/11/2008 | 10/11/2008 | |
| 44 | Agência Especial de Financiamento Industrial | FINAME | Ministério do Desenvolvimento, Indústria e Comércio Exterior | BNDES Group | 02/09/1966 | 21/06/1971 | |
| 45 | Petrobras Gás S.A. | GASPETRO | Ministério de Minas e Energia | GASPETRO Group | 26/02/1974 | 24/03/1976 | |
| 46 | Hospital de Clínicas de Porto Alegre | HCPA | Ministério da Educação | Treasury dependent | 02/09/1970 | 16/07/1971 | |
| 47 | Indústria Carboquímica Catarinense S.A.(Em Liquidação) | ICC (Em Liquidação) | Ministério de Minas e Energia | GASPETRO Group | 16/06/1969 | 04/07/1969 | |
| 48 | Indústria de Material Bélico do Brasil | IMBEL | Ministério da Defesa | Treasury dependent | 14/07/1975 | 21/01/1976 | |
| 49 | Indústrias Nucleares do Brasil S.A. | INB | Ministério da Ciência, Tecnologia e Inovação | Treasury dependent | 01/12/1971 | 31/08/1988 | |
| 50 | Innova S.A. | INNOVA | Ministério de Minas e Energia | Vendida pela Petrobrás | 28/04/1997 | 28/04/1997 | |
| 51 | Eólica Mangue Seco 2 Geradora e Comercializadora de Energia Elétrica S.A. | MANGUE SECO 2 | Ministério de Minas e Energia | PETROBRAS Group | 12/02/2010 | 12/02/2010 | |
| 52 | Nuclebrás Equipamentos Pesados S.A. | NUCLEP | Ministério da Ciência, Tecnologia e Inovação | Treasury dependent | 16/12/1975 | 16/12/1975 | |
| 53 | Petrobras America Inc. (Houston/Texas) | PAI | Ministério de Minas e Energia | PETROBRAS Group | 17/11/1987 | 29/12/1987 | |
| 54 | Petrobras Logística de Exploração e Produção S.A. | PB‐LOG | Ministério de Minas e Energia | PETROBRAS Group | 21/11/2000 | 21/11/2000 | |
| 55 | Petroleo Brasileiro Nigeria Limited | PBN | Ministério de Minas e Energia | PETROBRAS Group | 15/10/1997 | 15/10/1997 | |
| 56 | Petrobras Comercializadora de Energia Ltda. | PCEL | Ministério de Minas e Energia | PETROBRAS Group | 16/05/2002 | 16/05/2002 | |
| 57 | Petrobras Bolivia Inversiones y Servicios S.A. | PEBIS | Ministério de Minas e Energia | PETROBRAS Group | 13/10/2000 | 13/10/2000 | |
| 58 | Petrobras Colombia Limited | PEC | Ministério de Minas e Energia | PETROBRAS Group | 02/07/1984 | 02/07/1984 | |
| 59 | Petrobras Europe Limited | PEL | Ministério de Minas e Energia | PETROBRAS Group | 04/05/2001 | 04/05/2001 | |
| 60 | Petrobras Middle East B.V. | PEMID | Ministério de Minas e Energia | BRASPETRO Group | 01/07/2004 | 01/07/2004 | |
| 61 | Petrobras Tanzânia LTD. | PETAN | Ministério de Minas e Energia | BRASPETRO Group | 28/05/2004 | 28/05/2005 | |
| 62 | Petrobras Finance Limited | PFL | Ministério de Minas e Energia | PETROBRAS Group | 25/10/2001 | 25/10/2001 | |
| 63 | Petrobras International Braspetro B.V. Sucursal Angola | PIB ANG | Ministério de Minas e Energia | BRASPETRO Group | 22/01/2003 | 22/01/2003 | |
| 64 | Petrobras International Braspetro B.V. Sucursal Colombia | PIB COL | Ministério de Minas e Energia | BRASPETRO Group | 01/01/2003 | 01/01/2003 | |
| 65 | Petrobras International Finance Company | PIFCo | Ministério de Minas e Energia | PETROBRAS Group | 24/09/1997 | 24/09/1997 | |
| 66 | Petrobras México, S. DE R.L. DE C.V. | PM | Ministério de Minas e Energia | PETROBRAS Group | 31/03/2005 | 31/03/2005 | |
| 67 | Empresa Brasileira de Administração de Petróleo e Gás Natural S.A. - Pré‐Sal Petróleo S.A. | PPSA | Ministério de Minas e Energia | Vínculos jurídicos com PETROBRAS | 01/08/2013 | 12/11/2013 | |
| 68 | Petrobras Participaciones, S.L. | PPSL | Ministério de Minas e Energia | PETROBRAS Group | 30/09/2002 | 30/09/2002 | |
| 69 | Petrobras Singapore Private Limited | PSPL | Ministério de Minas e Energia | PETROBRAS Group | 06/04/2006 | 06/04/2006 | |
| 70 | Telebras Copa S.A. | TELEBRÁS COPA | Ministério das Comunicações | Grupo TELEBRAS | 07/11/2012 | 07/02/2013 | |
| 71 | Termobahia S.A. | TERMOBAHIA | Ministério de Minas e Energia | PETROBRAS Group | 07/08/1998 | 07/08/1998 | |
| 72 | Termomacaé Ltda. | TERMOMACAÉ | Ministério de Minas e Energia | PETROBRAS Group | 15/10/1997 | 15/10/1997 | |
| 73 | Termomacaé Comercializadora de Energia Ltda. | TERMOMACAÉ COMERCIALIZADORA | Ministério de Minas e Energia | PETROBRAS Group | 26/06/2006 | 26/06/2006 | |
| 74 | Transpetro International B.V. | TI B.V. | Ministério de Minas e Energia | TRANSPETRO Group | 15/09/2011 | 15/09/2011 | |
| 75 | Empresa de Trens Urbanos de Porto Alegre S.A. | TRENSURB | Ministério das Cidades | Treasury dependent | 17/04/1980 | 25/04/1980 | |
| 76 | VALEC Engenharia, Construções e Ferrovias S.A. | VALEC | Ministério dos Transportes | Treasury dependent | 27/02/1987 | 08/07/1988 | |
| 77 | Agência Brasileira Gestora de Fundos Garantidores e Garantias S.A. | ABGF | Ministério da Fazenda | Productive State sector | 30/08/2012 | 01/04/2013 | |
| 78 | ATIVOS S.A. Securitizadora de Créditos Financeiros | ATIVOS S.A. | Ministério da Fazenda | Bank of Brazil Group | 31/10/2002 | 31/10/2002 | |
| 79 | BBTUR Viagens e Turismo Ltda. | BB TURISMO | Ministério da Fazenda | Bank of Brazil Group | 31/03/1982 | 08/11/1982 | |
| 80 | Companhia de Armazéns e Silos do Estado de Minas Gerais | CASEMG | Ministério da Agricultura, Pecuária e Abastecimento | Productive State sector | 06/09/1957 | 06/09/1957 | 26/05/2000 |
| 81 | Companhia Docas do Ceará | CDC | Secretaria de Portos | Productive State sector | 23/07/1964 | 23/07/1964 | |
| 82 | Companhia Docas do Pará | CDP | Secretaria de Portos | Productive State sector | 10/02/1967 | 06/09/1967 | |
| 83 | Companhia Docas do Rio de Janeiro | CDRJ | Secretaria de Portos | Productive State sector | 28/02/1967 | 09/07/1973 | |
| 84 | Companhia de Entrepostos e Armazéns Gerais de São Paulo | CEAGESP | Ministério da Agricultura, Pecuária e Abastecimento | Productive State sector | 31/01/1969 | 31/05/1969 | 02/01/1998 |
| 85 | Centrais de Abastecimento de Minas Gerais S.A. | CEASAMINAS | Ministério da Agricultura, Pecuária e Abastecimento | Productive State sector | 20/10/1970 | 10/05/1971 | 26/05/2000 |
| 86 | Casa da Moeda do Brasil | CMB | Ministério da Fazenda | Productive State sector | 19/06/1973 | 20/09/1973 | |
| 87 | COBRA Tecnologia S.A. | COBRA | Ministério da Fazenda | Bank of Brazil Group | 18/07/1974 | 18/07/1974 | |
| 88 | Companhia das Docas do Estado da Bahia | CODEBA | Secretaria de Portos | Productive State sector | 10/07/1975 | 17/02/1977 | |
| 89 | Companhia Docas do Rio Grande do Norte | CODERN | Secretaria de Portos | Productive State sector | 27/08/1969 | 03/02/1970 | |
| 90 | Companhia Docas do Espírito Santo | CODESA | Secretaria de Portos | Productive State sector | 09/09/1982 | 21/02/1983 | |
| 91 | Companhia Docas do Estado de São Paulo | CODESP | Secretaria de Portos | Productive State sector | 15/09/1980 | 01/10/1980 | |
| 92 | Companhia Docas do Maranhão | CODOMAR | Ministério dos Transportes | Productive State sector | 28/12/1973 | 04/03/1974 | |
| 93 | Empresa de Tecnologia e Informações da Previdência Social | DATAPREV | Ministério da Previdência Social | Productive State sector | 04/11/1974 | 10/03/1975 | |
| 94 | Empresa Brasileira de Correios e Telégrafos | ECT | Ministério das Comunicações | Productive State sector | 20/03/1969 | 20/03/1969 | |
| 95 | Empresa Gestora de Ativos | EMGEA | Ministério da Fazenda | Productive State sector | 22/06/2001 | 26/06/2001 | |
| 96 | Empresa Gerencial de Projetos Navais | EMGEPRON | Ministério da Defesa | Productive State sector | 09/06/1982 | 28/06/1982 | |
| 97 | Empresa Brasileira de Hemoderivados e Biotecnologia | HEMOBRÁS | Ministério da Saúde | Productive State sector | 02/12/2004 | 28/03/2005 | |
| 98 | Empresa Brasileira de Infraestrutura Aeroportuária | INFRAERO | Secretaria de Aviação Civil | Productive State sector | 12/12/1972 | 31/05/1973 | 03/01/2003 |
| 99 | Serviço Federal de Processamento de Dados | SERPRO | Ministério da Fazenda | Productive State sector | 13/10/1970 | 12/04/1995 | |
| 100 | Telecomunicações Brasileiras S.A. | TELEBRÁS | Ministério das Comunicações | Grupo TELEBRAS | 11/07/1972 | 09/11/1972 | |
| 101 | Amazonas Distribuidora de Energia S.A. | AmE | Ministério de Minas e Energia | ELETROBRAS Group | 13/11/1997 | 23/12/1997 | 04/02/1998 |
| 102 | Amazonas Geração e Transmissão de Energia S.A. | AmGT | Ministério de Minas e Energia | ELETROBRAS Group | 04/04/2013 | 04/04/2013 | |
| 103 | Boa Vista Energia S.A. | BVENERGIA | Ministério de Minas e Energia | ELETROBRAS Group | 13/11/1997 | 23/12/1997 | 04/02/1998 |
| 104 | Companhia Energética de Alagoas | CEAL | Ministério de Minas e Energia | ELETROBRAS Group | 08/04/1959 | 17/08/1960 | 08/01/1998 |
| 105 | Centro de Pesquisas de Energia Elétrica | CEPEL | Ministério de Minas e Energia | ELETROBRAS Group | 25/01/1974 | 25/01/1974 | |
| 106 | Companhia Energética do Piauí | CEPISA | Ministério de Minas e Energia | ELETROBRAS Group | 01/12/1959 | 08/08/1962 | 08/01/1998 |
| 107 | Centrais Elétricas de Rondônia S.A. | CERON | Ministério de Minas e Energia | ELETROBRAS Group | 04/11/1968 | 01/12/1969 | 08/01/1998 |
| 108 | Companhia de Geração Térmica de Energia Elétrica | CGTEE | Ministério de Minas e Energia | ELETROBRAS Group | 26/12/1996 | 28/07/1997 | 30/11/1998 |
| 109 | Companhia Hidro Elétrica do São Francisco | CHESF | Ministério de Minas e Energia | ELETROBRAS Group | 03/10/1945 | 15/03/1948 | |
| 110 | Companhia de Eletricidade do Acre | ELETROACRE | Ministério de Minas e Energia | ELETROBRAS Group | 20/08/1968 | 20/08/1968 | 08/01/1998 |
| 111 | Eletrobras - Centrais Elétricas Brasileiras S.A. | ELETROBRAS | Ministério de Minas e Energia | ELETROBRAS Group | 25/04/1961 | 13/06/1962 | |
| 112 | Centrais Elétricas do Norte do Brasil S.A. | ELETRONORTE | Ministério de Minas e Energia | ELETROBRAS Group | 30/07/1973 | 20/06/1973 | |
| 113 | Eletrobras Termonuclear S.A. | ELETRONUCLEAR | Ministério de Minas e Energia | ELETROBRAS Group | 18/12/1975 | 18/12/1975 | |
| 114 | Eletrobras Participações S.A. | ELETROPAR | Ministério de Minas e Energia | ELETROBRAS Group | 29/01/1996 | 29/01/1996 | |
| 115 | ELETROSUL Centrais Elétricas S.A. | ELETROSUL | Ministério de Minas e Energia | ELETROBRAS Group | 23/04/1969 | 23/12/1968 | |
| 116 | FURNAS Centrais Elétricas S.A. | FURNAS | Ministério de Minas e Energia | ELETROBRAS Group | 28/02/1957 | 28/02/1957 | |
| 117 | Transmissora Sul Brasileira de Energia S.A. | TSBE | Ministério de Minas e Energia | ELETROSUL Group | 19/12/2011 | 19/12/2011 | |
| 118 | Transmissora Sul Litorânea de Energia S.A. | TSLE | Ministério de Minas e Energia | ELETROBRAS Group | 20/06/2012 | 20/06/2012 | |
| 119 | Uirapuru Transmissora de Energia S.A. | UIRAPURU | Ministério de Minas e Energia | ELETROBRAS Group | 27/10/2004 | 11/11/2004 | |
| 120 | Araucária Nitrogenados S.A. | ARAUCÁRIA | Ministério de Minas e Energia | PETROBRAS Group | 13/09/2010 | 13/09/2010 | |
| 121 | Arembepe Energia S.A. | AREMBEPE | Ministério de Minas e Energia | PETROBRAS Group | 23/01/2007 | 23/01/2007 | |
| 122 | Petrobras Distribuidora S.A. | BR | Ministério de Minas e Energia | Grupo BR Distribuidora | 27/07/1971 | 12/11/1971 | |
| 123 | Companhia Integrada Têxtil de Pernambuco | CITEPE | Ministério de Minas e Energia | PETROBRAS Group | 14/07/2006 | 14/07/2006 | |
| 124 | Energética Camaçari Muricy I S.A. | ECM 1 | Ministério de Minas e Energia | PETROBRAS Group | 22/01/2007 | 22/01/2007 | |
| 125 | Fronape International Company | FIC | Ministério de Minas e Energia | PETROBRAS Group | 10/04/1996 | 11/09/1998 | |
| 126 | Gás Brasiliano Distribuidora S.A. | GÁS BRASILIANO GBD | Ministério de Minas e Energia | PETROBRAS Group | 09/03/1999 | 09/03/1999 | |
| 127 | Liquigás Distribuidora S.A. | LIQUIGÁS | Ministério de Minas e Energia | Grupo BR Distribuidora | 21/12/2004 | 21/12/2004 | |
| 128 | Petrobras Biocombustível S.A. | PBIO | Ministério de Minas e Energia | PETROBRAS Group | 03/03/2008 | 16/06/2008 | |
| 129 | Petróleo Brasileiro S.A. | PETROBRAS | Ministério de Minas e Energia | PETROBRAS Group | 03/10/1953 | 02/04/1954 | |
| 130 | Companhia Petroquímica de Pernambuco | PETROQUÍMICASUAPE | Ministério de Minas e Energia | PETROBRAS Group | 11/04/2006 | 11/04/2006 | |
| 131 | Petrobras International Braspetro B.V. | PIB BV | Ministério de Minas e Energia | PETROBRAS Group | 27/08/2002 | 05/09/2002 | |
| 132 | Petrobras Netherlands B.V. | PNBV | Ministério de Minas e Energia | PETROBRAS Group | 07/05/2001 | 07/05/2001 | |
| 133 | Stratura Asfaltos S.A. | STRATURA ASFALTOS | Ministério de Minas e Energia | Grupo BR Distribuidora | 03/06/1972 | 13/06/1972 | |
| 134 | Transportadora Associada de Gás S.A. | TAG | Ministério de Minas e Energia | PETROBRAS Group | 15/01/2002 | 15/01/2002 | |
| 135 | Transportadora Brasileira Gasoduto Bolívia‐Brasil S.A. | TBG | Ministério de Minas e Energia | GASPETRO Group | 18/04/1997 | 18/04/1997 | |
| 136 | Petrobras Transporte S.A. | TRANSPETRO | Ministério de Minas e Energia | TRANSPETRO Group | 12/06/1998 | 30/06/1998 | |
| 137 | Banco da Amazônia S.A. | BASA | Ministério da Fazenda | Finance sector | 09/07/1942 | 01/08/1942 | |
| 138 | Banco do Brasil S.A. | BB | Ministério da Fazenda | Bank of Brazil Group | 12/10/1808 | 12/10/1808 | |
| 139 | Banco do Nordeste do Brasil S.A. | BNB | Ministério da Fazenda | Finance sector | 19/07/1952 | 18/01/1954 | |
| 140 | Banco Nacional de Desenvolvimento Econômico e Social | BNDES | Ministério do Desenvolvimento, Indústria e Comércio Exterior | BNDES Group | 20/06/1952 | 21/06/1971 | |
| 141 | Caixa Econômica Federal | CAIXA | Ministério da Fazenda | C.E.F. Group | 12/1/1861 | 12/08/1969 | |
| 142 | Financiadora de Estudos e Projetos | FINEP | Ministério da Ciência, Tecnologia e Inovação | Finance sector | 24/07/1967 | 24/07/1967 | |
| 143 | IRB Brasil Resseguros S.A. | IRB-Brasil Re | Ministério da Fazenda | Finance sector | 03/04/1939 | ??? | |
| 144 | Rio Branco Transmissora de Energia S.A. | RBTE | Ministério de Minas e Energia | Grupo ELETRONORTE | ??? | 21/07/2009 | 28/02/2011 |
| 145 | Refinaria Abreu e Lima S.A. | RNEST | Ministério de Minas e Energia | PETROBRAS Group | ??? | ??? | ??? |
| 146 | SFE - Sociedade Fluminense de Energia Ltda. | SFE | Ministério de Minas e Energia | PETROBRAS Group | 19/08/1998 | ??? | ??? |
| 147 | Companhia Locadora de Equipamentos Petrolíferos (Incorporated by Petrobras) | CLEP | Ministério de Minas e Energia | PETROBRAS Group | ??? | ??? | ??? |
| 148 | Termoaçu S.A. (Incorporated by Petrobras) | TERMOAÇU | Ministério de Minas e Energia | PETROBRAS Group | ??? | ??? | ??? |
| 149 | Termoceará Ltda. (Incorporated by Petrobras) | TERMOCEARÁ | Ministério de Minas e Energia | PETROBRAS Group | ??? | ??? | ??? |

== See also ==
- Federal institutions of Brazil
- List of government-owned companies
