= MEC Livros =

Brazilian free digital book lending service

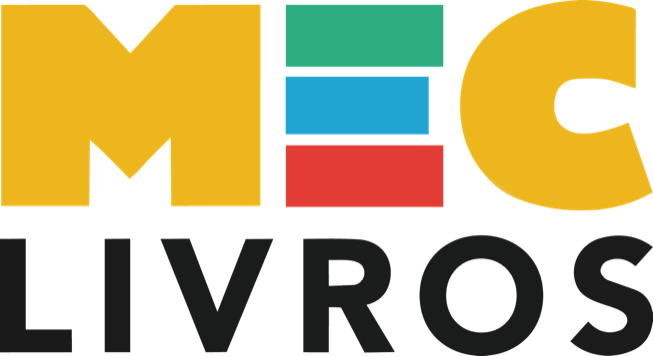

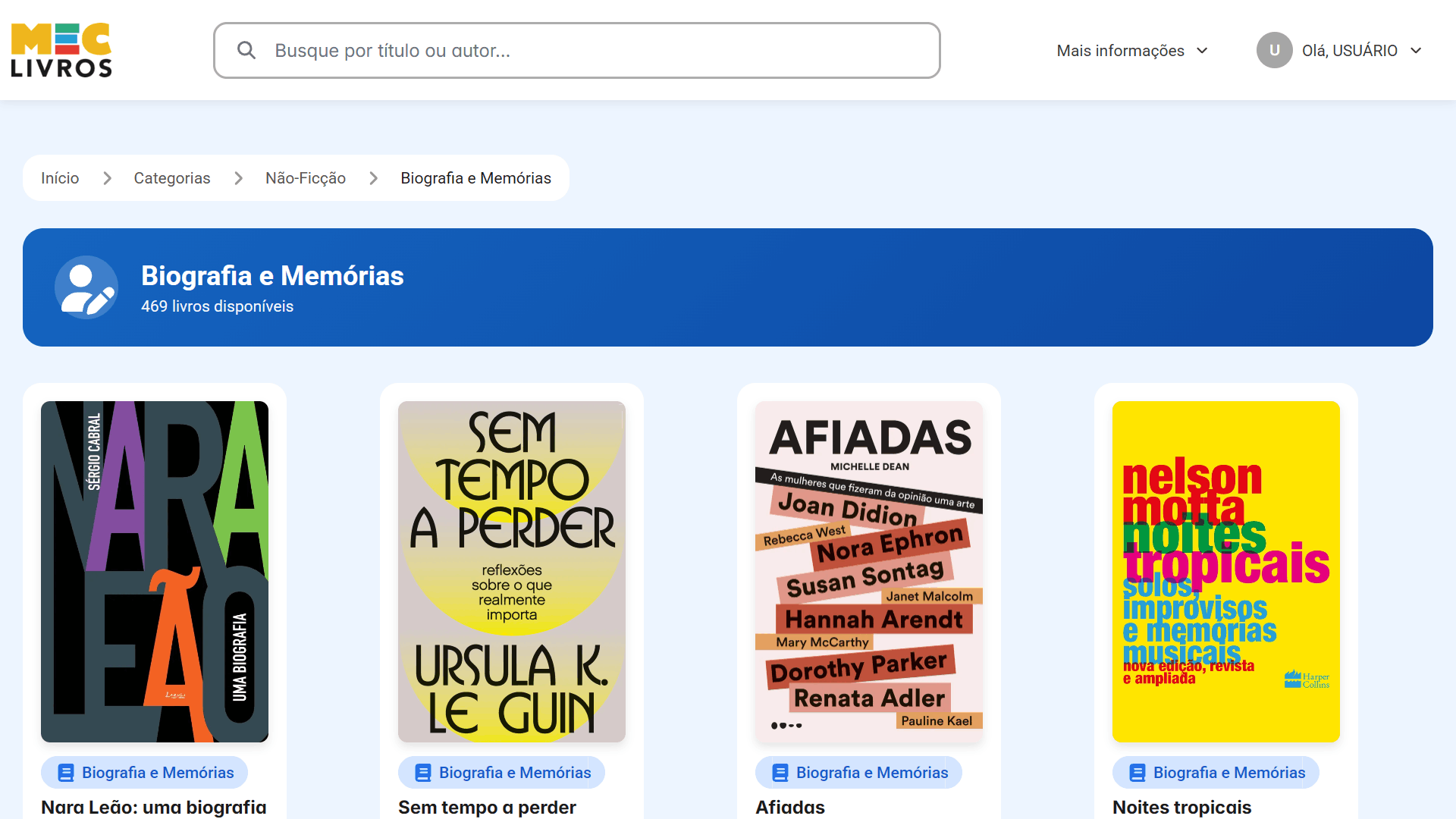
- "Biographies and Memories" section on the platform
- Website type: Digital library
- Available in: Brazilian Portuguese
- Headquarters: {{{location_country}}}
- Owners: Ministry of Education, Government of Brazil (2026–present)
- Industry: Entertainment
- Website: meclivros.mec.gov.br
- Advertising: No
- Commercial: No
- Registration: Required
- Users: As of June 2026: 862 thousand (total); 379 thousand (active)
- Launched: 6 April 2026; 5 months ago
- Current status: Active

MEC Livros is a free digital public library project of the Ministry of Education (MEC) of Brazil. It was launched in April 2025, initially with a collection of under 8 thousand books, expanded to 25 thousand later in the month.

== Platform ==
To borrow books, users are required to log in using the Gov.br Single Sign-On system. After logging in, users are allowed to borrow one book to read at a time, for up to 14 days, with the option to renew their lending for another 14 days when that period expires if there is no waiting list. After borrowing a book, the user is only given the option to read it on the platform; for works that have entered the public domain, the user may also have an option to download it as a PDF or an EPUB.

== Collection ==
On launch, the platform's collection was advertised to have 1.2 thousand new and best-seller books; 3.6 thousand backlist/longsellers; and 2 thousand public domain and partnered works. A couple of weeks later, the collection was expanded to a total of 25 thousand books, though its updated makeup breakdown wasn't disclosed.

The collection covers a wide range of genres. Notable books available include Jane Austen's Pride and Prejudice (1813); Dostoevsky's Crime and Punishment (1866); Machado de Assis' The Posthumous Memoirs of Brás Cubas (1881); Scott Fitzgerald's The Great Gatsby (1925); Guimarães Rosa's Primeiras Estórias (1962); Fernando Pessoa's The Book of Disquiet (1982); J.K. Rowling's Harry Potter and the Philosopher's Stone (1997); Han Kang's The Vegetarian (2007); and Édouard Louis' History of Violence (2016).

== Usage statistics ==
As of June 2026, the platform had been accessed by 862 thousand people, 379 thousand (44%) of which had borrowed at least one book. On the flip side, 13 thousand (52%) books had been borrowed at least once. There were also reportedly 107 thousand instances of people reading books in their entirety, from start to finish.

Following a film adaptation deal announcement in March, Socorro Acioli's A Cabeça do Santo (2014) became the most sought after book on the platform, having been borrowed 27.5 thousand times. It was followed in popularity by Crime and Punishment (1866), White Nights (1848), The Vegetarian (2007) and We Do Not Part (2021).

== See also ==
- Tela Brasil
- Internet Archive
