= .pa =

Country code top-level domain for Panama

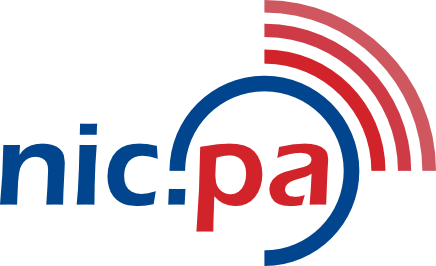
- Introduced: 25 May 1994
- TLD type: Country code top-level domain
- Status: Active
- Registry: NIC Panamá
- Sponsor: PANNET, Universidad Tecnologica de Panama
- Intended use: Entities connected with Panama
- Actual use: Fairly popular in Panama
- Registration restrictions: Currently, for a registration under the second level domain name .pa, the registrant has to register the same domain name under a third Level domain.
- Structure: Registrations are at second level, and at third level beneath second-level labels
- Documents: FAQ
- Dispute policies: UDRP
- Registry website: NIC Panama

.pa is the Internet country code top-level domain (ccTLD) for Panama. It was first registered on 25 May 1994. It is administered by NIC Panamá, which is run by the Universidad Tecnologica de Panama.

Because "PA" is also the postal code for the U.S. state of Pennsylvania and the Brazilian state of Pará, it has had occasional use under that meaning, but this has not become widespread. Technically, Pennsylvania is assigned .pa.us under the .us locality namespace, and Pará under the pa.gov.br.

== Structure ==
Registrations are taken directly at the second level, and at the third level under the designated second level domains.

List of TLDs under .pa
Domain name	Intended use
com.pa	Commercial entities
ac.pa	Institutions or institutions of higher education or research
edu.pa	Educational institutions or organizations, and educational projects
net.pa	Internet service providers
org.pa	Non-profit institutions or entities
gob.pa	Panamanian Government agencies or institutions
sld.pa	Health institutions or agencies
nom.pa	Natural persons
abo.pa	Professionals in the area of law (Lawyers)
ing.pa	Professionals of the engineering area
med.pa	Medical doctors

== Restrictions ==
Any term that is listed in the list of reserved terms cannot be registered as a domain name. The list consists of, but is not limited to, other generic and country-code TLDs, country names, governmental entities, and DNS related terminology.

The server the domain points to can be located in any country; with the exception of .gob.pa domains, which are used solely for Panamanian Government agencies or institutions, should point to a server physically located in Panama.
