= Vehicle restriction in São Paulo =

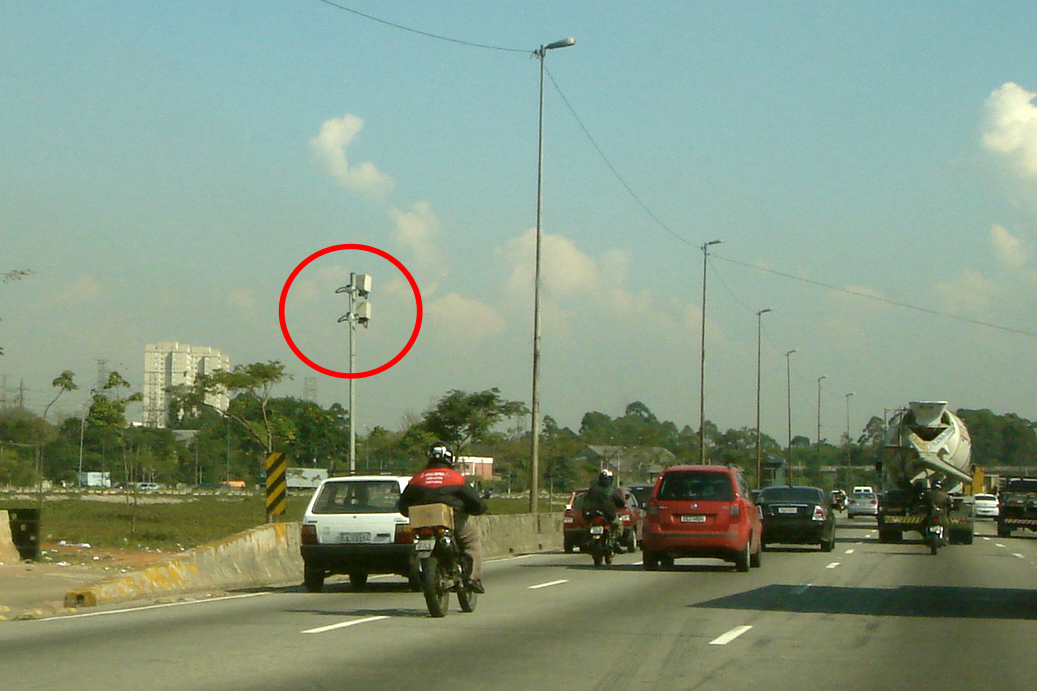
Automatic speed limit surveillance devices are used in São Paulo to enforce alternate-day travel restrictions based on licence plate numbers.

Rodízio veicular, or vehicle restriction, is a restriction on traffic in São Paulo, Brazil, during peak travel times. It is based on the last digit of the vehicle's number plate. São Paulo is the largest metropolis in the world with a permanent alternate-day travel restriction. The scheme was first implemented in 1995 as a trial on a voluntary basis, and then as a mandatory restriction implemented in August 1996 to mitigate air pollution, and thereafter made permanent in June 1997 to relieve traffic congestion. The driving restriction applies to passenger cars and commercial vehicles, and it is based on the last digit of the licence plate. Two numbers are restricted to travel every day between 7 a.m. to 10 a.m. and 5 p.m. to 8 p.m. from Monday through Friday.

Currently, the rotation does not apply to the entire city, being limited to a region called Expanded Center, which is delimited by the following roads:

- River Tietê Marginal
- River Pinheiros Marginal
- Avenida dos Bandeirantes
- Avenida Afonso D' Escragnole Taunay
- Maria Maluf Road Complex
- Avenida Presidente Tancredo Neves
- Avenida das Juntas Provisórias
- Viaduto Grande São Paulo
- Avenida Professor Luís Inácio de Anhaia Melo
- Avenida Salim Farah Maluf

There is a scale that determines which days of the week which vehicles cannot circulate. This scale is governed by the last digit of the vehicle's license plate, being:

Day	Monday	Tuesday	Wednesday	Thursday	Friday	Saturday	Sunday
Prohibited digits	1 and 2	3 and 4	5 and 6	7 and 8	9 and 0	None	None

Vehicles exempted from the restriction include buses and other urban transportation vehicles, school buses, ambulances and other medical services vehicles, mail and fire cars and trucks, police and military vehicles, cash-in-transit armored vehicles, vehicles delivering perishable food products, properly registered vehicles for use by people with disabilities, and other public utility vehicles. In May 2014 the City Council approved a law to exempt plug-in electric vehicles, hybrid electric vehicles and fuel-cell vehicles with a licence plate registered in the city from the restriction. The benefits for electric-drive vehicles went into effect in September 2015.

The offence results in a "medium" number of 4 points (out of a maximum of 20) on the Carteira Nacional de Habilitação (Brazilian driving licence). As of 2017 the fine is R$130.16, reduced to R$104.13 if paid promptly.
