= Driving licence in Brazil =

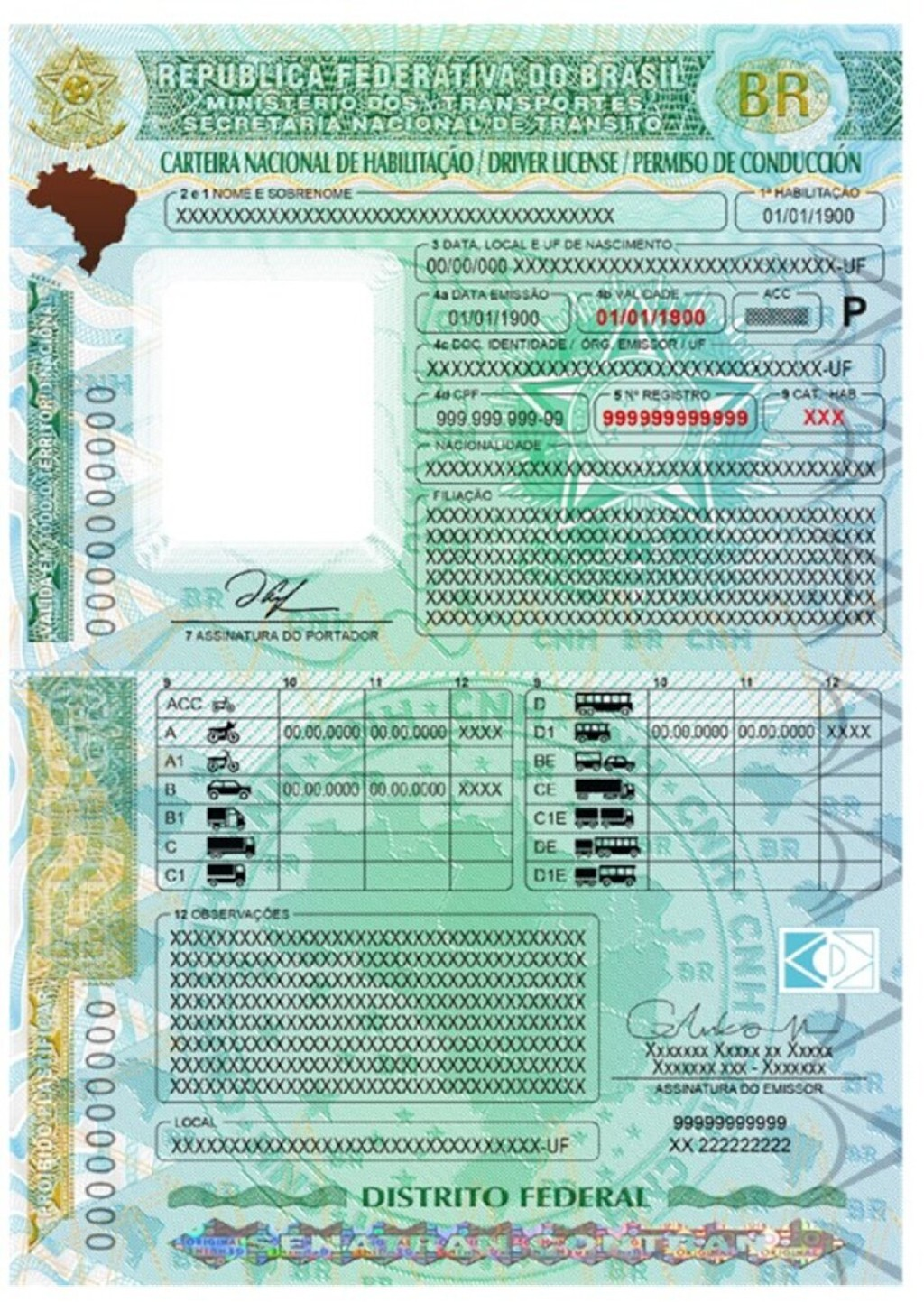
Current model of the Brazilian driver's license in paper currency adopted in October 2023

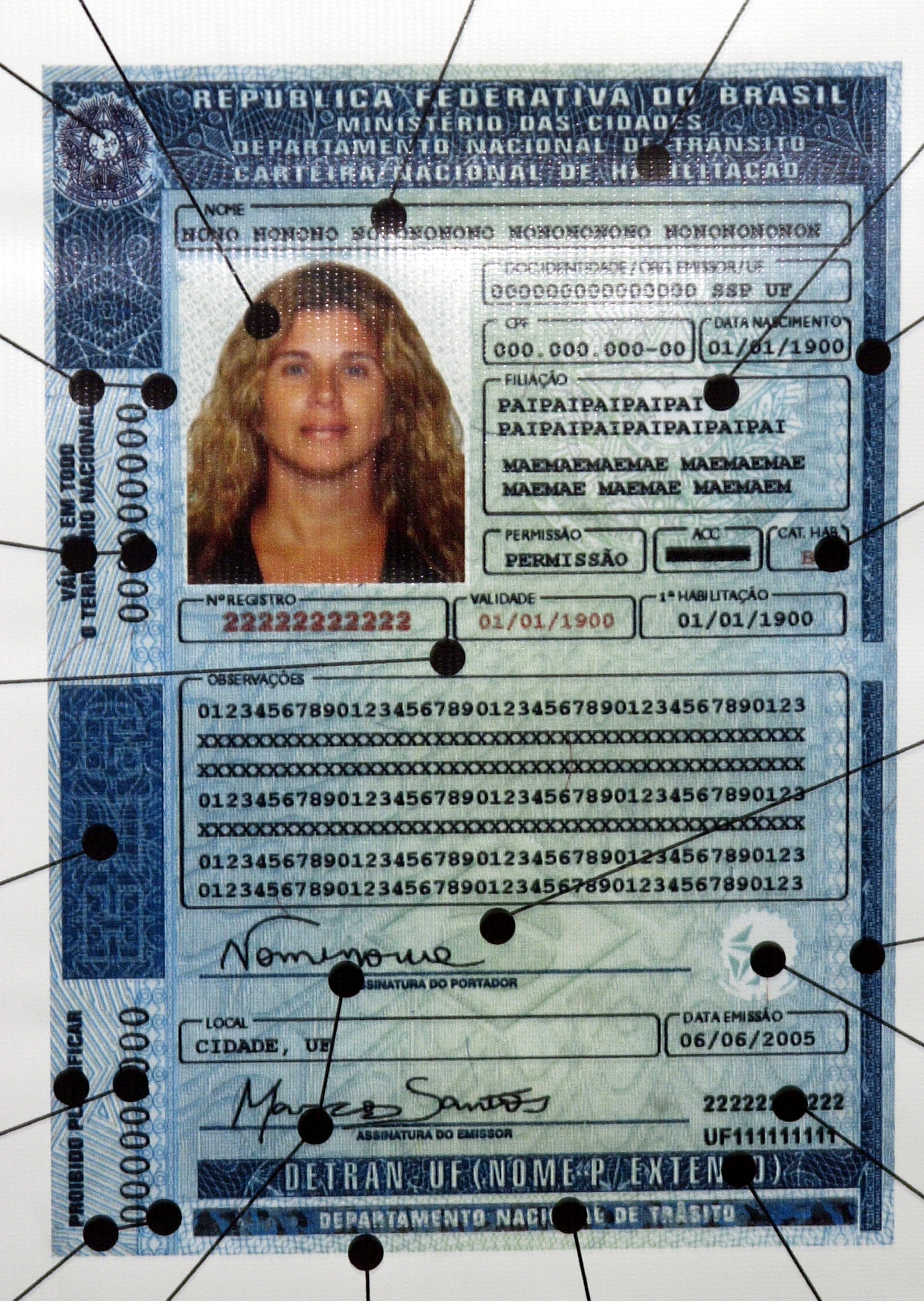
Model of an old CNH, issued from 2006 to 2015

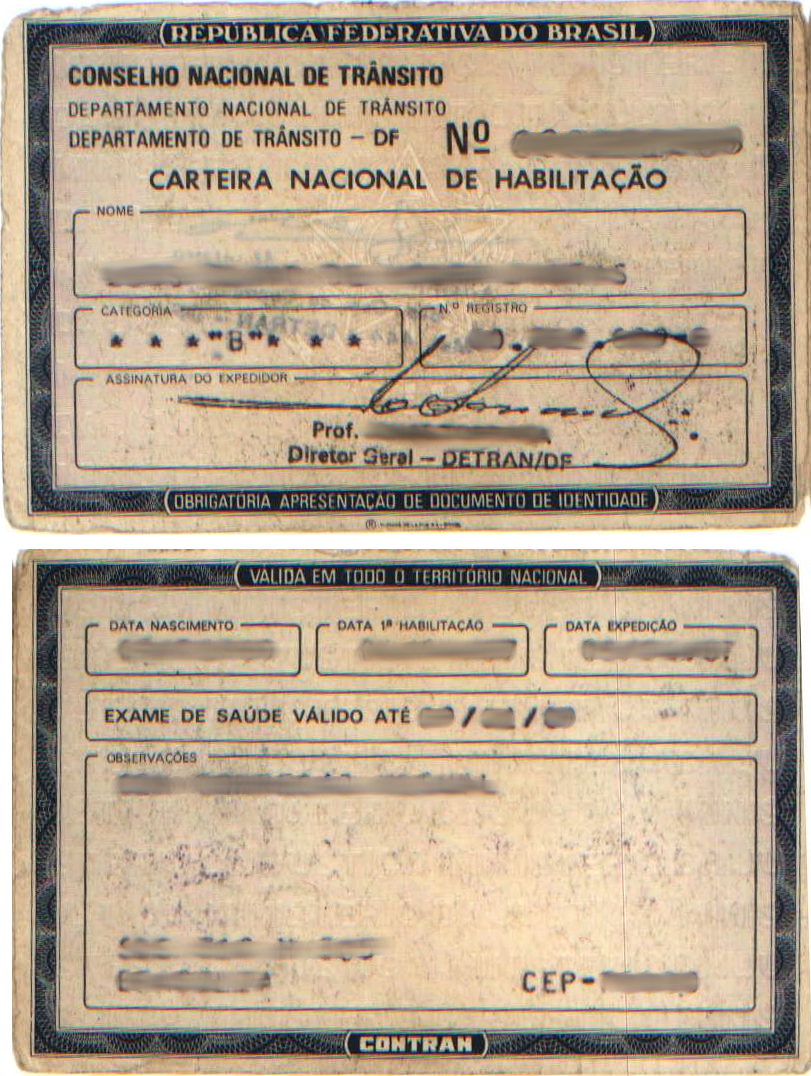
Model of an old CNH, issued in 1987

In Brazil, a driver's licence (officially named Carteira Nacional de Habilitação in Portuguese, shortened as CNH and translated as "National Qualification Card") is required in order to drive cars, buses, trucks and motorcycles. Current CNHs can be used as identity cards in all the national territory.

It was formerly called PGU, but in 2008 CONTRAN (Conselho Nacional de Trânsito, translated as "National Traffic Council") overhauled the system, requiring all driver's holders to re-register, so they could be grouped in Renach (Registro Nacional de Condutores Habilitados, National Register of Qualified Drivers).

Minors, the illiterate, and people without an ID card are not allowed to have a CNH.

== Required training ==
Until 2008, 20 hours of theory classes and 15 hours of practical classes were required in order to obtain a CNH. However, from 2009 on, a total of 45 hours of theory classes are required for all categories, these classes now covering the previously optional subjects such as Brazilian traffic law, defensive driving and first aid. After attending the classes, students are subjected to a 30-question test, and are approved if providing at least 21 correct answers. Finally, at least 25 hours of practical lessons must be taken plus more 4 hours of night lessons, and 5 hours in a car simulator, accompanied by an instructor from a certified driving school.

== Infractions ==
When a vehicle is spotted (either by a traffic agent, the police or an automated system such as a speed camera) violating traffic regulations, its owner receives a notification by post, including details of the violation: type; location; the penalty fine; and proof, if available, like pictures taken by speed cameras. Fifteen days after this notification is received, the actual ticket is issued. During these 15 days, the owner can submit a form to inform the traffic authority if they were not the one driving the car when the offence was committed. For example, if Marcos lends his car to Paulo, and Paulo commits a traffic offence, Marcos will receive the notification. He then fills the form with Paulo's information, has Paulo sign it and submit it to the traffic authority within the 15 days. Then all fines and other sanctions for that violation will be issued to Paulo instead of Marcos.

Traffic violations in Brazil issue points against the driver's license. Offences are divided in four categories: "minor" (3 points), "medium" (4 points), "serious" (5 points) and "very serious" (7 points). The points for a traffic violation last for one year, starting at the day of the offence.

If at any time the total score passes 20 points (which means the driver has obtained more than 20 points within one year), the license will be suspended and the local traffic authority will notify the driver, who can enter a defense within the next sixty days. In after the 60 days the traffic authority will decide the duration of the suspension, which can vary from 1 to 24 months. Once the suspension period ends and the driver completes an "offender driver reeducation course", the suspension is terminated.

== Temporary CNH ==
Also called PPD ("Permissão Para Dirigir" translated as "Permission To Drive"). The first driving licence is a 1-year permit. It is basically the same as a fully-fledged licence, but with some particularities regarding infractions and penalties. The permit may be revoked (instead of only suspended) in the case of committing any "very serious" or "serious" infraction, or two "medium" infractions. The 20 points system remains the same. Having the CNH permit revoked means the driver must restart the entire process to acquire a new CNH permit.

== Expiration Date ==
The Brazilian driving licence is valid for 30 days after the expiration date. It means one can still drive for 30 days after expiration date using the expired licence.

== Categories ==
CNHs are divided in five categories, according to the vehicles the driver is allowed to drive:

- Category A – Two or three-wheeled motor vehicles, with or without a sidecar. This category is for motorcycle drivers.
- Category B – Any motor vehicle not in category A that weights up to 3,500 kg (~7,700 lb), can carry at most 8 people besides the driver, and has no articulation or trailer. This category is for all common cars up to vans, although in the latter, the passenger-carrying capacity has to be considered. Note that the law limits the capacity of the vehicle, not the actual number of passengers, so a driver with a category B can not drive a van with more than 8 seats (9 with the driver's) even if none of the other seats are occupied. Traffic regulations forbid more than one passenger per seat and requires all passengers to be seated, except for buses, so this is a de facto limit on passengers too, although this regulation is rarely enforced.
- Category C – Same as category B, but without the weight limit. This category allows all vehicles in category B, in addition to rigid trucks.
- Category D – Same as category C, but without the passenger limit. This category allows all vehicles in category C, in addition to rigid buses (thus allowing all vehicles except motorcycles, semi trucks and articulated buses).
- Category E – Same as category D, but also allowing trailers (including semi trucks) and articulated buses. This category allows all street-legal vehicles with four wheels or more.

The requirements for each category are as follows:

- Categories A and B - The applicant must be at least 18 years old, be able to read and write (although not necessarily with proficiency) and have an ID card, in addition to being approved in physical and psychological examinations.
- Category C - The applicant must have a CNH of category B for at least a year.
- Category D - The applicant must be at least 21 years old and have a CNH of category B for at least two years or of category C for at least a year.
- Category E - The applicant must be at least 21 years old and have a CNH of category C or D for at least a year.

=== Additional requirements ===
Some types of vehicles or uses require additional training. The additional courses are:

- Emergency vehicles course - Required to drive emergency vehicles like ambulances or police cars.
- Public passenger transport course - Required to drive vehicles used in public transport, like urban public buses. Requires a CNH category D.
- School vehicles course - Required to drive vehicles used to transport students, such as school buses. Requires a CNH category D.
- Transportation of hazardous products course - Required to drive vehicles transporting hazardous materials, such as flammable, explosive, corrosive or radioactive substances, as well as substances that release hazardous materials when exposed to water, substances that can self-ignite, and any kind of poisonous substance. Requires a CNH category C.

The driver is not allowed to sign up for any of these courses if they committed a serious or very serious or more than one medium offence less than a year before or if their CNH is suspended.

== Digital Driver's License ==
In 2017, the Ministry of Cities (MCID) in partnership with the National Department of Traffic – DENATRAN (currently SENATRAN) and SERPRO launched the digital version of the CNH. For then Minister Bruno Araújo, in addition to streamlining the process, the Digital CNH would offer an innovative way of identification. The Digital CNH (CDT) is the digital version of the CNH with the same legal value as the printed version. The intention of this format is to facilitate the electronic validation, document recovery and greater durability, thus providing mobility, practicality and convenience, in addition to security. The 26 states and the Federal District are already enabled to issue the Digital CNH.

In general, the Digital Driver's License is an application that stores, on the cell phone, the driver's license and the vehicle document that is in your name, or in the name of another owner, as long as the latter shares the vehicle document through the app. The digital license has the same validity as the printed documents. To enable the Digital CNH, the driver must have the CNH printed with the QR code (issued from 2017 onwards).

== See also ==
- Vehicle Restriction in São Paulo
