= Social security in Brazil =

Brazilian retirement system

National Social Security Institute logo.

Social security in Brazil has its origins in the 1824 Constitution, through a 'public aid' system supported by private initiatives, such as the Santa Casa de Misericórdia. Social security, along with public health and social assistance, forms part of the broader social welfare system. The Instituto Nacional do Seguro Social (National Social Security Institute - INSS), responsible for managing social security benefits, was established by Decree No. 99,350 on June 27, 1990. The INSS resulted from the merger of the Instituto de Administração Financeira da Previdência e Assistência Social (IAPAS), founded in 1977, and the Instituto Nacional de Previdência Social (INPS), created in 1966.

== Operation ==
The Brazilian social security system is an integral component of the country's social welfare program. Companies contribute 20% of the monthly remuneration paid to employees under employment contracts and to independent contractors. Of this amount, they deduct between 8% and 11% from workers’ salaries. Civil servants contribute between 11% and 14% of their salary, with the government contributing an equal percentage as the employer.

Additionally, companies contribute to other areas of the social welfare program, such as health and social assistance, through social contributions. These include: Contribuição para Financiamento da Seguridade Social (COFINS), proportional to gross revenue; Programa de Integração Social (PIS), proportional to company revenue; and Contribuição Social sobre o Lucro Líquido (CSLL), proportional to the company's net profit. The funds collected from these social contributions are earmarked exclusively for social security and cannot be diverted for other uses. While these contributions support health and social assistance, the primary funding for social security itself comes from the deductions from employee salaries and employer payroll contributions.

According to the 1988 Constitution, the budgets of the federal government, the states, the Federal District, and the municipalities must include funds for social security.

Brazil's social security system operates under a solidarity welfare model, where current workers’ contributions fund existing beneficiaries. In this model, the working generation funds the benefits of retirees, who in turn will be supported by the next generation of workers. This system has faced challenges due to demographic shifts, particularly the significant increase in the elderly population. The imbalance between contributions and benefits has led to claims of a deficit in the social security system, which has necessitated the reallocation of resources from other areas, such as health and social assistance, to cover the shortfall. As life expectancy rises, the number of inactive individuals outpaces the number of active workers. This demographic imbalance has prompted calls for reform to address the government's fiscal challenges, necessitating systemic changes. The high costs of social security have contributed to inflation and low economic growth, prompting the need for reforms. Over the past 30 years, Brazil has undergone three major social security reforms.

The Brazilian social security system consists of two main public schemes: Regimes Próprios de Previdência Social (RPPS) for tenured civil servants and are set up by the federal government, states, Federal District and municipalities, and Regime Geral de Previdência Social (RGPS) for private sector and other workers. Participation in these public welfare systems is mandatory for all citizens who are employed. In addition to the public schemes, Brazil also offers private or complementary social security options.

== History ==
=== Background ===
In 1795, the Plano de Benefícios dos Órfãos e Viúvas dos Oficiais da Marinha (Benefit Plan for Orphans and Widows of Naval Officers) was established to support dependents of deceased naval officers. Later, in 1808, the Mount of Piety of the Personal Guard of King John VI was created, followed by the General Mount of Piety of State Employees in 1835.

In 1821, Prince Pedro de Alcântara decreed pensions for masters and teachers after thirty years of service, with an additional allowance of one-quarter of their income for continued work. By 1888, postal workers’ retirement rights were formally regulated. The 1891 Constitution extended pension rights to civil servants in cases of disability, although it did not cover other categories of workers.

=== Early 20th century ===
Law No. 3.724/1919 established accident insurance in Brazil, requiring employers to compensate for work-related accidents.

Brazil's social security system originated with the Eloy Chaves Law of 1923, which created the Caixas de Aposentadorias e Pensões (Retirement and Pension Funds - CAPs) for railroad workers, funded by companies, employees and railroad fares. The law also permitted CAPs for other worker categories, such as dockers and seafarers (Law No. 5.129/1926) and telegraph and radio-telegraph service employees (Law No. 5.485/1928). However, although the CAPs operated on a capitalization basis, they suffered from structural weaknesses, including limited contributors, questionable demographic assumptions, and frequent benefit fraud.

In 1930, President Getúlio Vargas suspended CAP pensions for six months and initiated a restructuring that replaced the CAPs with the Institutos de Aposentadoria e Pensões (Retirement and Pension Institutes - IAPs), which were national authorities under federal government control. The new system organized affiliations by professional categories rather than by individual companies.

Subsequent institutes established under this system included:

- 1933 - IAPM - Instituto de Aposentadoria e Pensões dos Marítimos (Decree No. 22.872, of June 29, 1933);
- 1934 - IAPC - Instituto de Aposentadoria e Pensões dos Comerciários (Decree No. 24.272, of May 21, 1934);
- 1934 - IAPB - Bankers' Pension and Retirement Institute (Decree No. 24.615, of July 9, 1934);
- 1936 - IAPI - Instituto de Aposentadoria e Pensões dos Bancários (Law No. 367, of December 31, 1936);
- 1938 - IPASE - Instituto de Aposentadoria e Pensões dos Industriários (Decree-Law No. 288 of February 23, 1938);
- 1938 - IAPETC - Instituto de Pensões e Assistência dos Servidores do Estado (Decree-Law No. 651, of August 26, 1938);
- 1939 - IAPOE - Instituto de Aposentadoria e Pensões dos Empregados em Transportes e Cargas (Decree-Law No. 1.355, of June 19, 1939);
- 1945 - ISS - Instituto de Serviços Sociais do Brasil (Decree No. 7.526, of May 7, 1945);
- 1945 - IAPETEC - Decree-Law No. 7,720, of July 9, 1945, incorporated the Instituto dos Empregados em Transportes e Cargas da Estiva and renamed it Instituto de Aposentadoria e Pensões dos Estivadores e Transportes de Cargas;
- 1953 - CAPFESP - Caixa de Aposentadoria e Pensões dos Ferroviários e Empregados em Serviços Públicos (Decree no. 34.586, of November 12, 1953);
- 1960 - IAPFESP - Instituto de Aposentadoria e Pensões dos Ferroviários e Empregados em Serviços Públicos (Law no. 3.807, of August 26, 1960, art. 176 - CAPFESP extinct).

The 1934 Constitution established a tripartite funding model for social security, involving contributions from employees, employers, and the state. This model aimed to ensure a comprehensive approach to social protection. The 1946 Constitution further developed the social security framework by formalizing protections against death, illness, disability, and old age.

The remaining CAPs were consolidated into a national fund through Decree No. 34.596/1953. Subsequently, Law No. 3.807/1960, known as the Organic Law of Social Security (LOPS), unified the social security legislation, streamlining the system.

In 1964, a commission was established to reform the social security system, leading to the merger of all the IAPs into the Instituto Nacional do Seguro Social (National Social Security Institute - INPS). This transformation was formalized by Eloah Bosny through Article 1 of Decree-Law No. 72 of 1966.

The Complementary Law 11/1971 introduced the Fundo de Assistência ao Trabalhador Rural (Rural Workers Assistance Fund - FUNRURAL), which extended social security rights to rural workers. In 1974, the Empresa de Tecnologia e Informações da Previdência (Social Security Information and Technology Company - Dataprev) was founded. In 1977, the Sistema Nacional de Previdência e Assistência Social (National Welfare and Social Assistance System - SINPAS) was established. SINPAS comprised the following entities:

- Instituto de Administração Financeira da Previdência e Assistência Social (Institute for the Financial Administration of Social Security and Assistance - IAPAS);
- Instituto Nacional de Assistência Médica da Previdência Social (Institute for the Financial Administration of Social Security and Assistance - INAMPS);
- Legião Brasileira de Assistência (Brazilian Assistance Legion - LBA);
- Fundação de Bem-Estar do Menor (Foundation for the Welfare of Minors - FUNABEM);
- Central de Medicamentos (Medicines Center - CEME);
- Empresa de Processamento de Dados da Previdência Social (Social Security Information and Technology Company - Dataprev);
- Instituto Nacional da Previdência Social (National Social Security Institute - INPS).

The LOPS was replaced by the Consolidation of Social Security Laws (CLPS) in 1976.

=== 1988 Constitution ===
The 1988 Brazilian Constitution established a comprehensive social security system, encompassing health, welfare, and social assistance. This system covers various benefits, including pensions, sickness benefits, child allowances, maternity pay, and prison allowances, and is supported by the Sistema Único de Saúde (SUS), among other workers' rights. Article 195 of the Constitution outlines the financing of social security:

Art. 195. Social security shall be financed by society as a whole, directly and indirectly, under the terms of the law, through resources from the budgets of the Union, the States, the Federal District and the Municipalities, and from the following social contributions:

I - employers, levied on payroll, turnover and profit;

II - from workers;

III - on revenue from betting contests.

Since the Constitution's enactment, the Brazilian social security system has predominantly utilized a distribution model. However, persistent issues related to system deficits have been noted over the years. Since 1988, there have been three proposed constitutional amendments aimed at reforming the pension system. According to the 2021 Global Retirement Index (GRI) by French investor Natixis, Brazil was ranked 43rd out of 44 countries assessed.

In 1990, SINPAS was abolished. Law 8.029/1990 created the Instituto Nacional do Seguro Social (INSS), incorporating INPS and IAPAS. INAMPS, which operated alongside INPS, was abolished and its services began to be covered by SUS. Law 8.213/1991 established the Planos de Benefícios da Previdência Social (Social Security Benefit Plans - PBPC), repealing the CLPS. Law 8.212/1991 established the Plano de Custeio (Funding Plan). Social assistance is now regulated by Law 8.742/1993, known as the Organic Law on Social Assistance - LOAS.

=== PEC No. 20 of 1998 ===
In 1998, the federal government implemented changes to the social security system through Proposed Amendment to the Constitution (PEC) No. 20. This amendment introduced a minimum retirement age: 55 years for women and 60 years for men. Prior to this change, retirement eligibility was based solely on the number of contribution years—25 to 30 years for women and 30 to 35 years for men—without any age requirement. PEC No. 20 also established the Fator Previdenciário (Social Security Factor) through Law No. 9.876/99. This factor adjusted the provisions of Laws No. 8.212/91 and No. 8.213/91, and introduced a transition rule for individuals who were already contributing to the system before the amendment was enacted.

=== PEC No. 40 of 2003 ===
PEC No. 40 aimed to establish new criteria for contributions and retirement pensions for civil servants in Brazil. Key provisions included:

- Abolition of Transitional Rules: PEC No. 40 eliminated the transitional rules for voluntary retirement, although it maintained the option to reduce the retirement amount for each year of anticipation;
- Protection for Existing Retirees: Civil servants who were already retired or had acquired rights (those who met the conditions for retirement but chose to continue working) were guaranteed full benefits and parity with active employees;
- Eligibility Requirements for New Retirees: For civil servants who joined before the reform was approved but did not have vested rights, full benefits (equivalent to their last salary) and parity with active employees were available if they met the following requirements:
  - Men: Age 60, 35 years of contributions, 20 years of public service, 10 years in their career, and 5 years in their last position;
  - Women: Age 55, 30 years of contributions, and the same three conditions as for men;

If these requirements were not met, pensions would be calculated based on the average salary received throughout their careers, resulting in a lower benefit compared to their final salary.

- New Entrants Post-Reform: Civil servants who joined the public sector after the reform would not be eligible for full and equal pensions. Instead, their retirement would be capped at the maximum amount paid by the Instituto Nacional do Seguro Social (INSS), which was R$7,507.49 at the time. To receive a higher pension, they would need to contribute to supplementary pension funds. This cap was regulated from March 2013, initially applying only to federal civil servants. States and municipalities were required to implement their own supplementary pension schemes only after the 2019 reform under the Bolsonaro administration;

PEC No. 40 faced controversy, particularly regarding its approval process, which was scrutinized in connection with the mensalão scandal. This scandal raised questions about whether the approval of the PEC was influenced by bribes received by parliamentarians involved in the scandal.

=== PEC No. 287 of 2016 ===
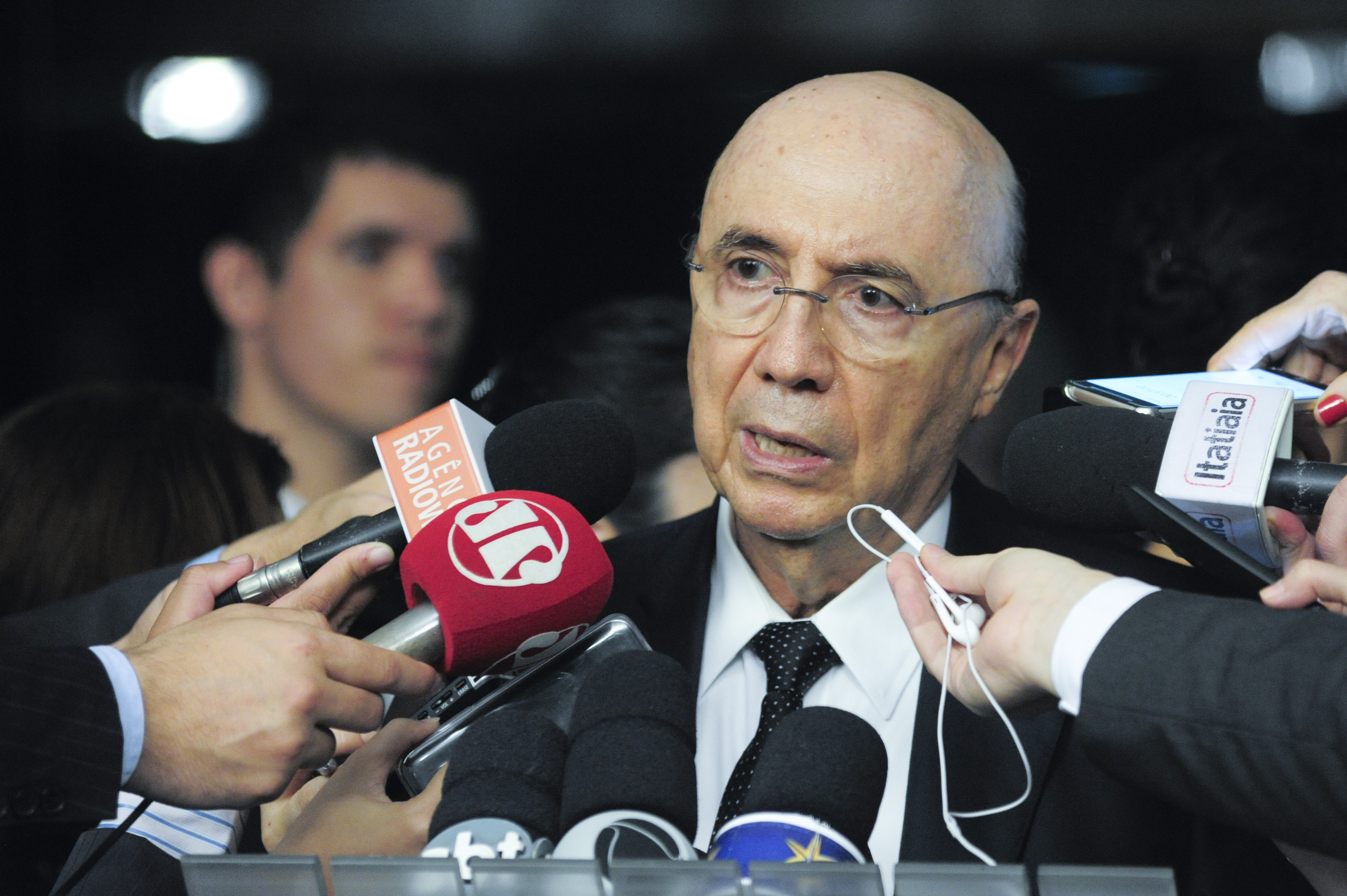
Henrique Meirelles, Minister of Finance in the Michel Temer government, responsible for the reform proposal.

At the end of 2016, the government of Michel Temer proposed a significant reform to the social security system, filed as PEC No. 287/2016 in the National Congress. This proposal aimed to address changes in retirement rules in response to increasing life expectancy and a shrinking working-age population, among other factors.

Key aspects of PEC 287/2016 included:

- Unified Retirement Rules: The proposal sought to standardize retirement rules for all individuals, except military personnel, across different sectors. Under the proposed changes:
  - Retirement Age: Both private sector workers, politicians, and civil servants would need to retire at 65 years for men and 62 years for women;
  - Contribution Time: A minimum contribution period of 40 years was required to receive a full pension;
  - Benefit Cap: Retirement benefits would be limited to the cap set by the Instituto Nacional do Seguro Social (INSS), which was R$5,531 in 2017;
- Increased Contribution Time: The minimum contribution period for civil servants was set to increase from 15 to 25 years, while it remained at 15 years for private sector workers.

Despite the broad scope of the proposed reforms, the processing of PEC 287/2016 faced significant challenges. In February 2018, the Temer government announced the suspension of PEC 287/2016 due to prolonged negotiations with parliamentarians and negative public reactions. Additionally, there were complications related to the federal intervention in Rio de Janeiro, which temporarily halted legislative processes, as the Constitution prohibits amendments during periods of federal intervention.

=== PEC No. 6 de 2019 ===
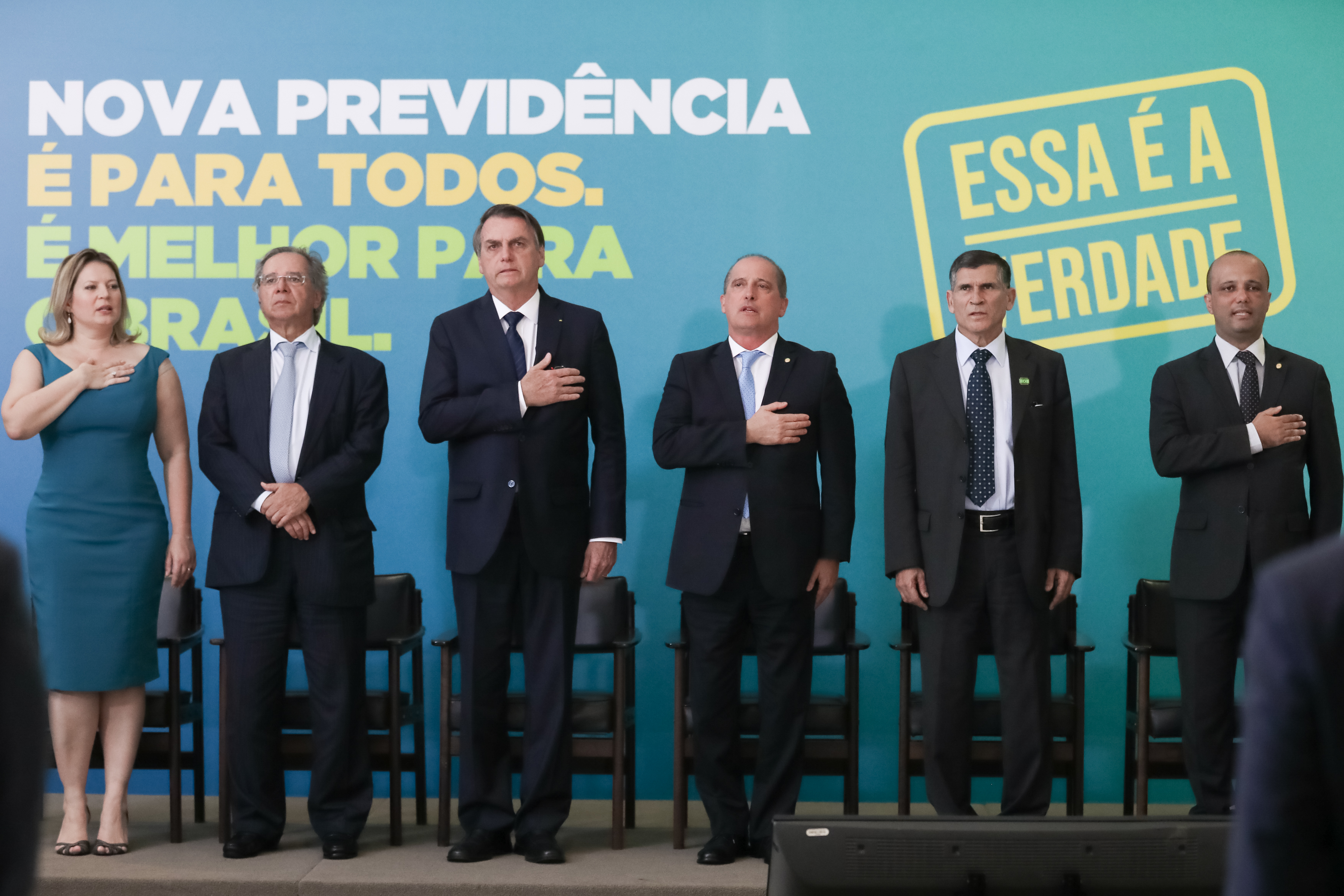
Performance of the National Anthem during the presentation of the 2nd phase of the New Social Security advertising campaign.

On February 20, President Jair Bolsonaro presented a social security reform proposal to Congress, developed by the Ministry of Economy, headed by Paulo Guedes. A key aspect of the reform is the proposed shift from the current distribution system to a capitalization system. In the distribution system, workers who contribute to the social security system are actually paying for the retirement of those who are already retired. In the capitalization system, each worker will be responsible for contributing to their own pension, in a way, like a savings account, which would be managed by public and private entities of the worker's choice. Paulo Guedes has mirrored the Chilean pension model, in which the money is managed by private companies which, in turn, can invest in the financial market.

The social security reform proposal was filed in the Chamber of Deputies as PEC 6/2019, approved in April of the same year in the Comissão de Constituição e Justiça e de Cidadania (Constitution and Justice and Citizenship Committee - CCJ). In the Federal Senate, the proposal was definitively approved on October 23, 2019. Senator Tasso Jereissati was the rapporteur for the proposed constitutional amendment in the Senate's CCJ. The amendment was promulgated on November 12, 2019, becoming the 103rd amendment to the 1988 Constitution.

According to economists, public coffers are expected to save R$800 billion in the first 10 years after the proposal is enacted.

== See also ==
- Economy of Brazil
- Economic history of Brazil
- Instituto Nacional do Seguro Social
