= Polytechnic School of the University of São Paulo =

Engineering School of the University of São Paulo
- Escola Politécnica da Universidade de São Paulo
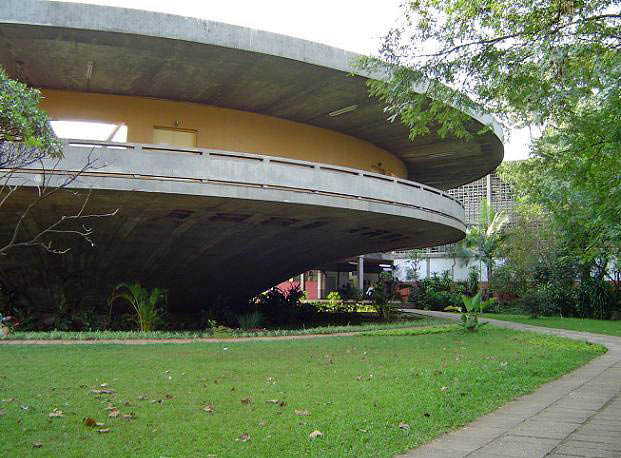
- "Poli's Biênio building"
- Type: Public
- Established: 1893
- Parent institution: University of São Paulo
- Affiliations: TIME
- Academic staff: 460
- Undergraduates: 4661
- Postgraduates: 3482
- Location: São Paulo, São Paulo State, Brazil; 23°33′18″S 46°43′47″W
- Campus: Urban
- Website: https://www5.usp.br/#english

The Escola Politécnica of the University of São Paulo (or the Engineering School of the University of São Paulo, Portuguese: Escola Politécnica da Universidade de São Paulo) (usually called Poli, Poli-USP or EPUSP) is an engineering school at the University of São Paulo (USP) in São Paulo, Brazil.

It was founded in 1893 - before the creation of USP itself - and was the first engineering school in the state of São Paulo. Its original name was "Escola Politécnica de São Paulo". It was incorporated by USP in 1934. Its students are known as "politécnicos".

== Admissions ==
Admission for undergraduates takes place annually, along with all other courses in the USP, through an exam called "vestibular" held by an institution named FUVEST (University Foundation for the Vestibular). The Escola Politécnica selects only 870 students out of 13,500 applicants, making it the largest engineering admittance exam in Brazil and also one of the most competitive. Students who have begun their engineering degree elsewhere in Brazil can also transfer to the Escola Politécnica if they pass a specific examination.

The school also admits international undergraduate students from partner universities through a separate admission process. These students can apply either for open exchanges or a double degree, in which case they receive a degree from University of São Paulo as well.

A separate process exists for master and doctoral courses.

== Courses ==
The Escola Politécnica is regarded as having the most complete engineering program in Latin America. It offers 17 courses for undergraduate students besides 10 master and 9 doctorate tracks. It offers courses in the following fields:

- Chemical Engineering
- Civil Engineering
- Computer Engineering
- Electric Engineering - Automation and Control
- Electric Engineering - Power and Automation
- Electric Engineering - Electronic and Computer Systems
- Electric Engineering - Telecommunications
- Environmental Engineering
- Materials Engineering
- Mechanical Engineering
- Mechatronics Engineering
- Metallurgic Engineering
- Mining Engineering
- Naval Engineering
- Nuclear Engineering
- Petroleum Engineering
- Production Engineering

== International Partnerships ==
The Escola Politécnica has established numerous exchange programs for its undergraduate students to promote their international mobility. It was the first institution outside Europe to belong to the TIME (Top Industrial Managers for Europe) network, promoting exchange programs and double degrees with several other institutions, of which Technische Universität Darmstadt, the Technical University of Munich, École centrale Paris, Politecnico di Milano, Politecnico di Torino. It has also a double degree program with the École Polytechnique. An average of 70 students receive a double degree from Poli and a partner institution every year, which constitutes around 10% of its student body.

Due to historical reasons and the closer links between University of São Paulo and European universities, most of the partnerships are with European institutions, especially in Germany and France. In this sense, Poli-USP has signed agreements with universities belonging to the prestigious TU9 German Institutes of Technology, Groupe des Écoles Centrales and ParisTech. However, it has also signed student exchange agreements with Asian, North and South American universities.

The following universities are partners of Poli-USP in student exchange programs:

Belgium

- Universitè Catholique de Louvain
- Université de Mons
- KU Leuven Faculty of Engineering Science

Canada

- Université du Québec à Trois – Rivières

Colombia

- Universidad de Antioquia
- Universidad Industrial de Santander
- Universidad Tecnológica de Bolívar

Finland

- Aalto University

France

- Arts et Métiers ParisTech
- CentraleSupélec - former École Centrale Paris and École Supérieure d'Électricité (Supélec)
- Chimie ParisTech
- École européenne d'ingénieurs en génie des matériaux
- École Centrale de Lille
- École Centrale de Marseille
- École Centrale de Nantes
- École Centrale de Lyon
- École nationale supérieure de chimie de Lille
- École nationale supérieure de chimie de Montpellier
- ENSTA ParisTech
- École Spéciale des Travaux Publics
- École nationale supérieure des mines de Saint-Étienne
- Grenoble INP
- École supérieure d'optique
- Mines ParisTech
- Mines Nancy
- Télécom ParisTech
- Université de Technologie de Compiègne
- Université de Toulon

Germany

- Technische Universität Darmstadt
- Technical University of Munich
- Technische Universität Berlin
- RWTH Aachen University
- University of Stuttgart
- University of Duisburg-Essen
- University of the German Federal Armed Forces
- Leibniz University Hannover
- Helmholtz Centre for Environmental Research
- University of Bremen

India

- Indian School of Mines

Italy

- Politecnico di Milano
- Politecnico di Torino
- Università degli Studi di Padova
- Università degli Studi di Palermo
- University of Trento
- Sapienza University of Rome

Japan

- Shibaura Institute of Technology

Mexico

- Instituto Politécnico Nacional

Peru

- Pontificia Universidad Catolica del Peru

Portugal

- Instituto Superior Técnico

Singapore

- University of Singapore

South Korea

- KAIST

Spain

- Universidad de Jaen
- Universidad de Navarra
- Universidad de Zaragoza
- Universidad Politecnica de Madrid
- Universidad Politecnica de Valencia

Sweden

- Lund University

United States

- University of Utah

Venezuela

- Universidad Simón Bolívar

== Budget ==
The Escola Politécnica has the largest budget among Brazilian engineering schools. Its 2013 annual budget, supplied by the state of São Paulo and distributed by the university's administration was R$204.118.235,96 (~US$85.000.000).

The School receives investments from private companies as well, which currently have more than 300 agreements and contracts with the institution. One of the most well-known partnerships is with PACE, which comprises General Motors, HP, Siemens Digital Industries Software, Autodesk and Oracle. The PACE program also sponsors universities like MIT and Virginia Tech, providing high-level CAD/CAE software.

In 2011, a group of alumni created the Escola Politécnica Endowment, with the goal to gather additional resources from alumni and companies - a pioneer in Brazilian universities. In 2014, the Endowment merged with another alumni fund, called Amigos da Poli, forming a R$6.1 million fund dedicated to finance student projects.

== Campus ==
The Escola Politécnica is part of the Cidade Universitária, located in the city of São Paulo. The School has a constructed area of 151,500 square meters (~1,631,000 sq. ft.), being the largest among all other units in the university. It has 103 laboratories, which are part of 15 departments for teaching and research.

As of Sep/2014, the School had 4,520 undergraduate students, 841 students seeking a master's degree and 733 students seeking a PhD degree.

== See also ==
- Patinho Feio, the first minicomputer designed and manufactured entirely in Brazil with POLI professors and students
- Victor Dubugras
