= Patinho Feio =

First minicomputer created entirely in Brazil

Patinho Feio (Portuguese for "Ugly Duckling", in reference to the fairy tale) was the first minicomputer designed and manufactured entirely in Brazil. It was made between 1971 and 1972 in the Polytechnic School of the University of São Paulo by the Digital Systems Laboratory (currently called Department of Computer Engineering and Digital Systems).

== Technology ==
Patinho Feio was an 8-bit minicomputer with a memory of 8 kB and an instruction cycle of 2 microseconds. It was programmed in assembly language.

== See also ==
- Zezinho
