= Gov.br =

Brazilian e-government platform

gov.br
- Website type: Public service
- Available in: Brazilian Portuguese
- Founded: 31 July 2019; 7 years ago
- Area served: Brazil
- Website: gov.br
- Commercial: No
- Users: 166 million (2025)
- Current status: Active

gov.br is the official e-government digital platform for the federal government of Brazil. It has offered digital services for citizens in a single, centralized web portal since 31 July 2019, though the Brazilian government has had e-government portals under different names since the early 2000s.

The portal saw wide adoption after its launch: by November 2020, it had 84 million registered users; by April 2025, the portal purportedly had 166 million users, representing approximately 78% of the country's population (estimated at 213 million at the time).

== History ==
=== Previous efforts ===
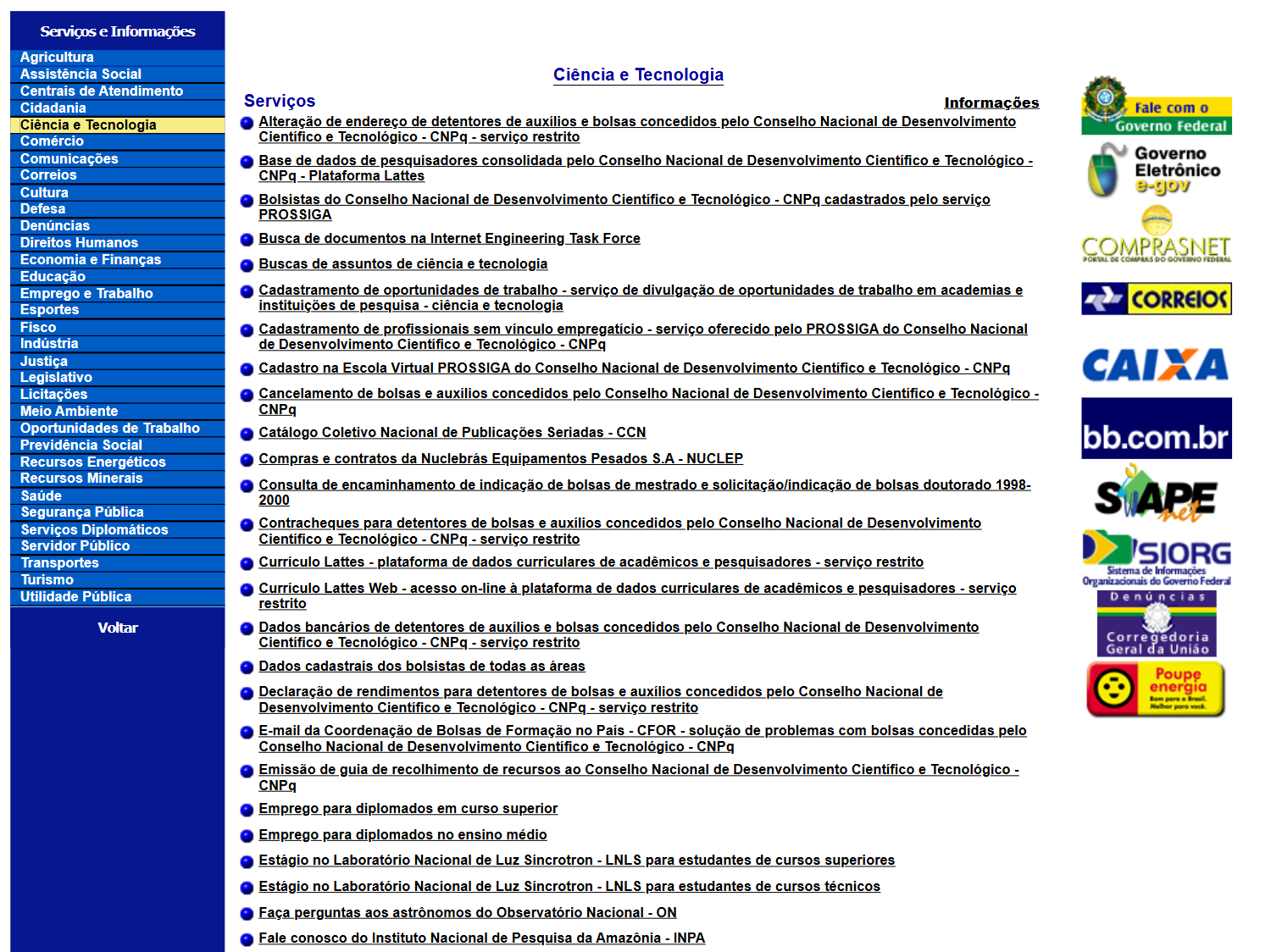
"Rede Governo" 's Science and Technology page, as seen in February 2002

The first initiative for federal-level e-government policy in Brazil begun in April 2000. This resulted in the Programa de Governo Eletrônico (lit. 'Electronic Government Program'), overseen by the Comitê Executivo de Governo Eletrônico (Cege; lit. 'Electronic Government Executive Committee'). As part of their work, the team expanded a website which had been online since early 1999, "Rede Governo" (redegoverno.gov.br), into a centralized online government services and information portal. There were many challenges: some technological, such as varying levels of integration between services available on the portal; and some societal, such as the high cost of computers and low Internet access by the Brazilian population at the time.

By the end of 2001, the portal had about 1350 services available; a year later, that number had grown to 1700, alongside around 22 thousand hyperlinks to access services and information in other governmental websites. However, work on the project had slowed considerably during the 2001–2002 energy crisis (crise do apagão, lit. 'blackout crisis') and, immediately after, during preparation for and in the aftermath of the 2002 Brazilian general election.

In June 2006, focused on expanding computer and Internet access to the population, the government launched the Portal de Inclusão Digital (lit. 'Digital Inclusion Portal', aimed at providing information on government initiatives in the field. Additionally, the first poll to assess citizens' satisfaction with the government's digital services was conducted.

In 2013, the government announced the Identidade Digital de Governo (lit. 'Digital Identity for the Government'), an initiative intended to standardize all government websites to a single design language and guarantee they were adequately accessible. Alongside the new design language, the servicos.gov.br portal was launched, consisting of a list of services offered by the federal government, further separated into those aimed at citizens and those aimed at companies.

=== Current platform ===
Starting in 2018, during a push for a 100% digital government with the aim to lower public spending, several changes were implemented in the federal sphere – such as migrations of systems to data lakes and the hiring of cloud services. Among these changes was the decision to create and enforce a single contact point for citizens to access government services, directly on gov.br, inspired by the United Kingdom's successful gov.uk platform. Part of this plan involved migrating all websites under the federal umbrella to the gov.br portal – those which were previously subdomains (such as inss.gov.br or mec.gov.br) would become redirects to their new pages, with a new standardized design language, directly on gov.br (i.e. gov.br/inss or gov.br/mec).

In July 2019, a beta version of the gov.br portal was launched, aiming to collect user feedback. At launch, it contained services previously available on servicos.gov.br and those directly relating to the executive branch. This totalled "over 3 thousand" services, "almost 50%" of which were fully digital. A year after its initial launch, in July 2020, the portal still offered around 3,600 services, 59% of which were fully digital; the launch had been followed closely by the start of the COVID-19 pandemic, which first reached Brazil in February 2020.

== Services ==
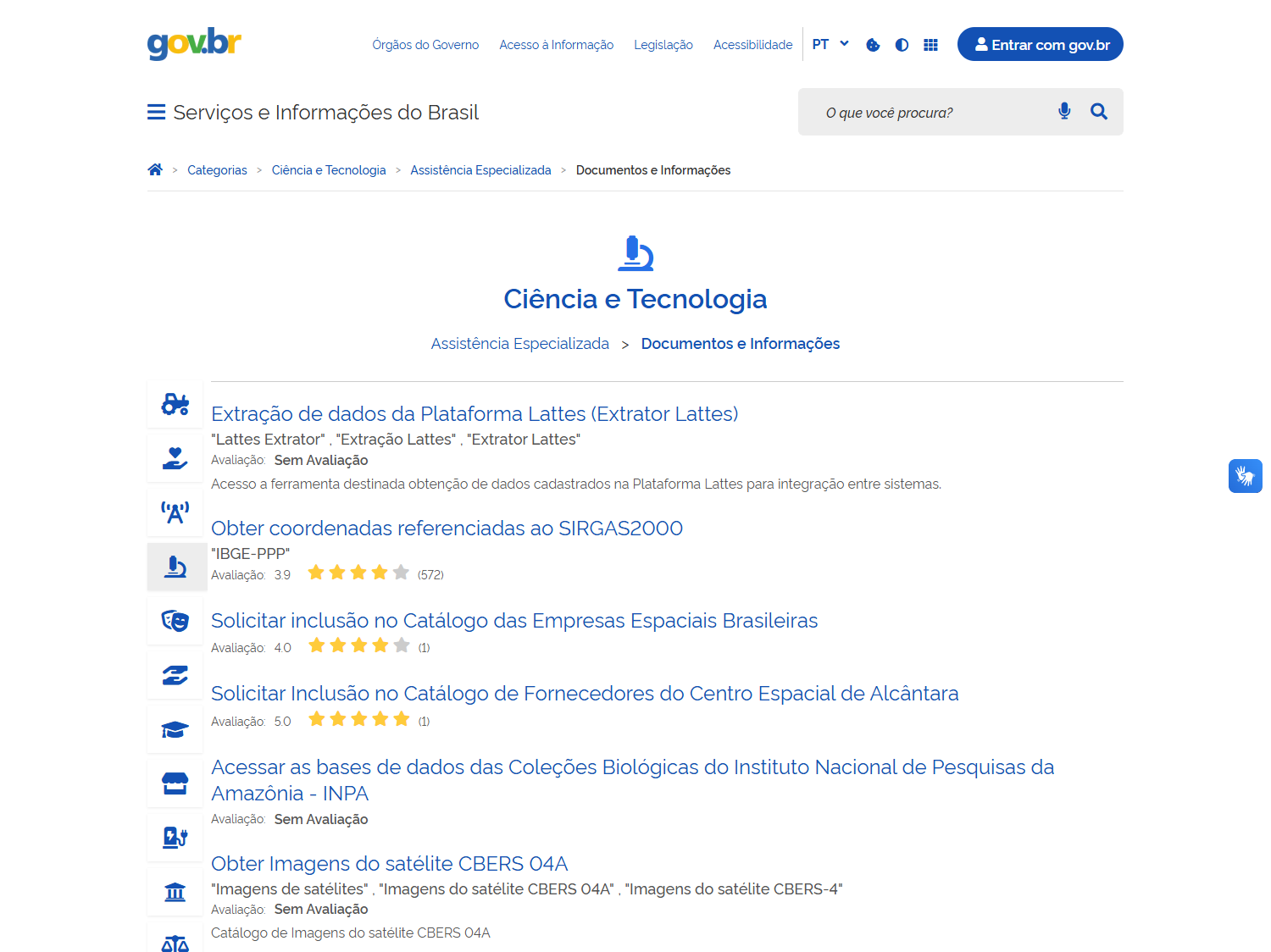
gov.br's Science and Technology page, as seen in November 2025

In April 2025, the portal reportedly offered over 4 thousand digital services. Among the most used were:

- Electronic signature service;
- Social Security services;
- Unified Health System services (such as access to medical history, including vaccines, exams and medications);
- National High School Exam registration;
- Higher Education Student Financing Fund registration;
- Digital employment record book;
- Digital driver's license

Other services include obtaining proof of military enlistment or exemption; requesting public documents via the Lei de Acesso à Informação (lit. 'Information Access Law'); submitting proof of life; or filing complaints against the government.

In 2022, the electronic signature service, which saw a mostly steady growth in users since its implementation in 2020, surpassed 2 million monthly signatures.

=== Single sign-on ===
gov.br Account
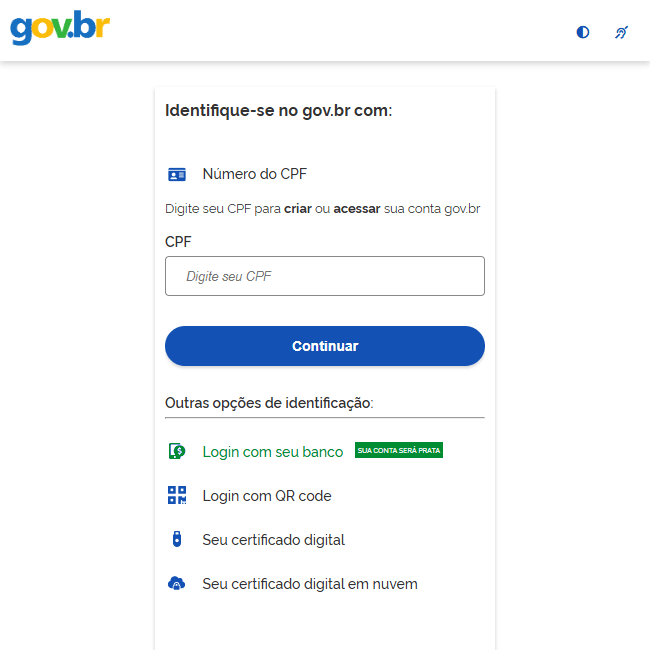
- Login page for gov.br's SSO service
- Native name: Conta gov.br
- Website: sso.acesso.gov.br

gov.br's most prominent service is its single sign-on, dubbed the "gov.br account". It provides authentication and proof of identity for services of the public sector, even in other spheres of government – i.e. state and municipal. It was established before the unified gov.br platform, in December 2016, as part of what was then called Plataforma de Cidadania Digital (lit. 'Digital Citizenship Platform'). Login to the platform makes use of a person's CPF number alongside a user-defined password; two-factor authentication is also available.

==== Account levels ====
Accounts on the service are classified according to how trustworthy their information on the user is. There are three classifications ("selos de confiabilidade", lit. 'seals of trustworthiness'), from least to most trustworthy: Bronze, Silver and Gold. These affect what services are available to the account, such as access to the digital document signing portal.

After an account is created, it becomes Bronze level when the information submitted is cross-referenced and validated with data from the Special Department of Federal Revenue of Brazil or the National Social Security Institute.

To obtain a Silver level account, the user must submit to a facial recognition test cross-referenced with their driver's license, or connect their bank account to validate their information.

The highest level of trust for an account is Gold, which is obtained by a facial recognition test cross-referenced with data from the Brazilian Election Justice, or by validating information with a compatible digital certificate.

Number of accounts by level
1. Gold: 67.55M
2. Silver: 30.92M
3. Bronze: 67.53M
As of April 2025

=== Online income tax statements ===
Since 2014, citizens have had the option to obtain their annual income tax statements pre-filled; however, that had been restricted to those with digital certificate flash drives, which are costly to acquire. In March 2021, a tool was introduced to the gov.br ecosystem to provide free online access to the pre-filled tax statements, requiring a Silver or Gold level account.

In 2025, of over 43 million income tax statement submissions in the country, over half (50.3%) were pre-filled, a first since the portal's launch.

== Rede Nacional de Governo Digital ==
The Rede Nacional de Governo Digital (a.k.a. Rede GOV.BR; lit. 'National Network of Digital Government') is a project of the federal government, established in 2018, aiming to integrate and amplify the availability of governmental services of different spheres – state and municipal level – over the Internet. As of August 2025, the governments of each of the 27 federative units and of their respective capitals were already part of the network, alongside over 2 thousand municipalities around the country.

== Accolades ==
In part due to the gov.br platform, Brazil was ranked "very high" on the World Bank's 2020 GovTech Maturity Index (GMTI), with an index of 0.92 (compared to a global average of 0.52). The GMTI was updated in 2022, and Brazil's ranking remained "very high".

== See also ==
- .br
- gov.uk
