= Instituto Nacional do Seguro Social =

Brazilian government agency

National Social Security Institute
- Instituto Nacional do Seguro Social

Agency overview
- Formed: 27 June 1990; 35 years ago
- Headquarters: Monumental Axis, F Block; Brasília, Federal District
- Agency executive: Gilberto Waller Júnior, President
- Parent department: Ministry of Social Security
- Website: www.gov.br/inss/

The Instituto Nacional do Seguro Social (English: National Social Security Institute) or INSS is a Brazilian government agency linked to the Ministry of Labor and Employment that collects contributions for the maintenance of the General Social Security System (RGPS), which is responsible for paying retirement pensions, maternity, death, reclusion, sickness and accident benefits, and other services belonging to the core of Exclusive State Activities, for those who are entitled to these benefits in accordance with the law. The INSS works in conjunction with Dataprev, the technology company that processes all social security data.

Besides the General System, states and municipalities can establish their own systems financed by specific contributions.

== History ==
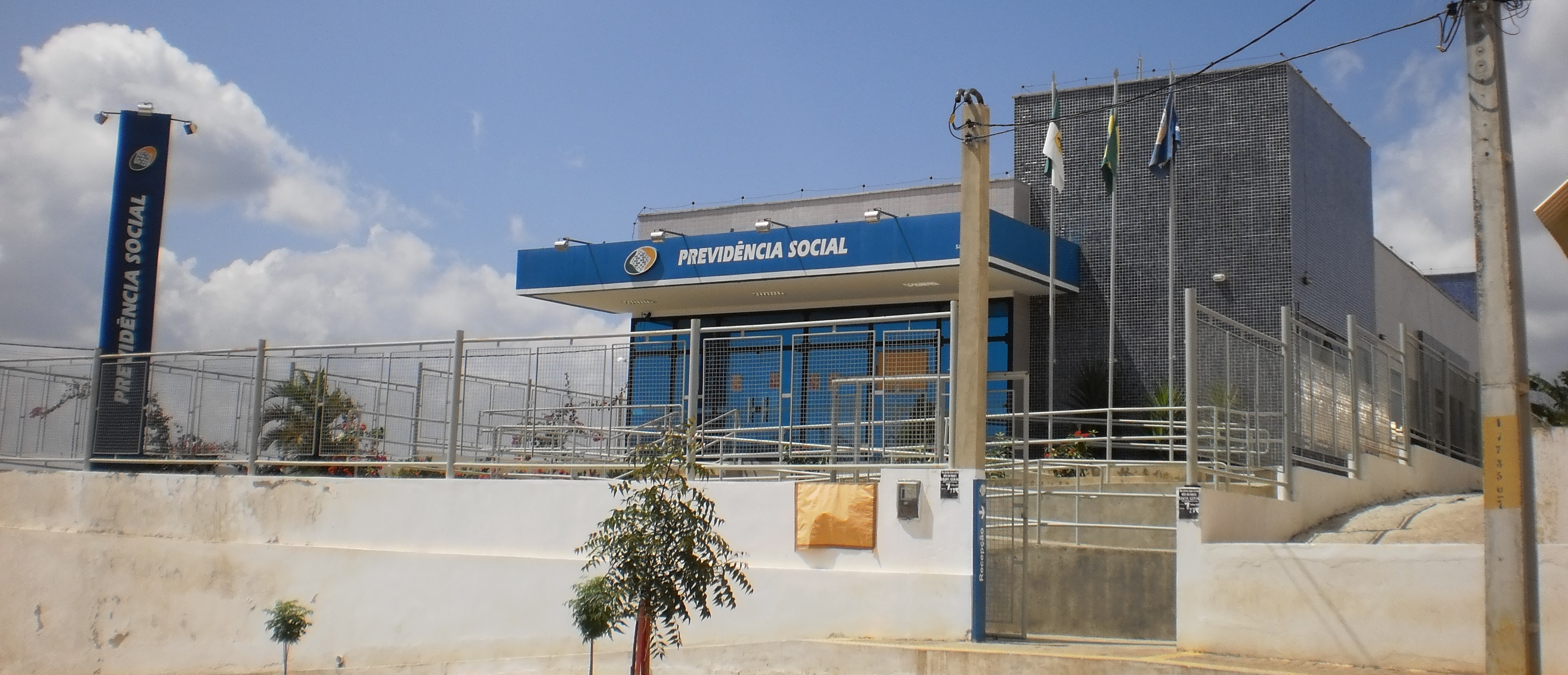
INSS Agency in the city of São Miguel, Rio Grande do Norte.

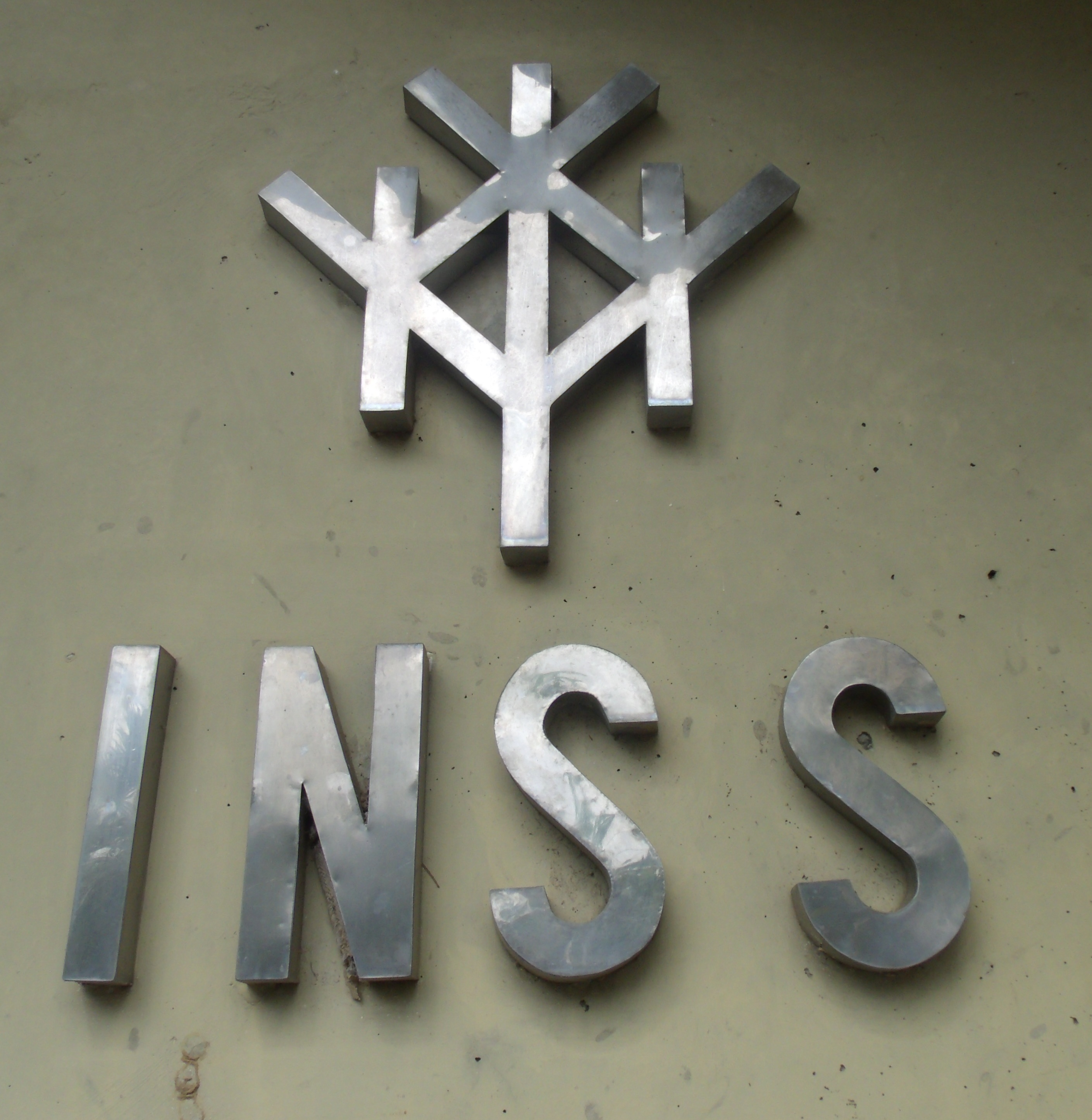
Metal logo on the front of an agency.

The INSS was created by the Federal Decree No. 99.350 of 27 June 1990, which merged the Instituto de Administração Financeira da Previdência e Assistência Social (English: Financial Administration of Social Security and Assistance), or IAPAS, and the Instituto Nacional de Previdência Social (English: National Social Security Institute), or INPS. It is responsible for implementing the protection of the rights of the clients of the General Social Security System (RGPS), which currently covers more than 40 million taxpayers, as well as helping to minimize social inequalities.

The institute has an administrative staff of almost 18,000 active employees, located in all parts of the country, who provide face-to-face assistance to more than four million people every month. It has a highly diversified network of around 1,500 service units, known as Social Security Agencies (APS), present in every state of the Federation. The Executive Offices (GEX) total 104, distributed into sectors and sub-sectors.

The income paid by the Social Security system is used to ensure the support of the worker and their family when they lose their ability to work due to illness, accident, pregnancy, imprisonment, death or old age. However, despite the social benefits, specialists point out that the INSS is in deficit. On 17 June 2015, then-president Dilma Rousseff signed the Federal Law 13,135, which established adjustment measures to reduce costs.

=== Instituto Nacional de Assistência Médica da Previdência Social ===
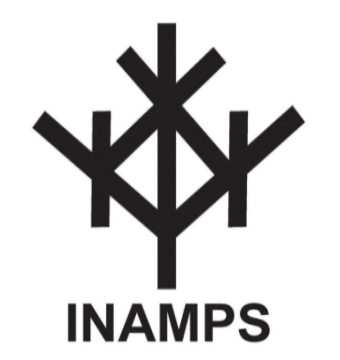
INAMPS logo.

The Instituto Nacional de Assistência Médica da Previdência Social (English: National Institute of Social Security Medical Assistance), or INAMPS, was a federal agency created in 1977 and abolished in 1993. Also in 1977, the Federal Law No. 6,439 established the Sistema Nacional de Previdência e Assistência Social (English: National Welfare and Social Assistance System), or SINPAS, in order to create a new model for the social security system focused on the specialization and integration of different activities and institutions. Under this system, the Instituto Nacional de Previdência Social (INPS) only kept the power to grant benefits, while INAMPS was responsible for providing medical assistance to insured people and the Instituto de Administração Financeira da Previdência e Assistência Social (IAPAS) was responsible for financial management.

At the beginning of 1985, the Federal Police exposed INAMPS' fraudulent scheme with around 30 hospitals out of the 179 affiliated, revealing a shortfall of around Cr$1.5 trillion. The fraud included the false issuance of hospital admissions and non-existent appointments. Since 1988, the SUS has been responsible for public health care, based on the Article 198 of the Federal Constitution, which states that health is a universal right. INAMPS was abolished in 1993 by the Federal Law No. 8,689, and its powers were distributed among the federal, state and municipal SUS management bodies.

== Collection of contributions ==
Part of the contributions are deducted from the payroll before the employee receives their full salary. However, there is a maximum limit for INSS deductions and the discount percentages depend on each person's salary. When the employee's salary is higher than the maximum contribution limit, it is only allowed to deduct an established amount, called the cap. Even if the worker earns more, they cannot contribute more. Social security laws change quite frequently, so the current table of INSS deductions from salary is:

Effective from January 1, 2022, For insured employees, domestic workers and freelance workers
Salary range	Rate
up to R$1.212,00	7,5%
from R$1.212,01 to 2.427,35	9%
from R$2.427,36 to 3.641,03	12%
from R$3.641,04 to 7.087,22	14%

- Maximum deduction limit: R$642.34;
- Amount deducted together with dependents for income tax calculation;
- In addition to the amount deducted at source, the company has to pay 20% of the payroll as INSS, regardless of whether there are salaries above the maximum cap. In other words, there is the employer's deduction and the employee's deduction;

There are different contribution rates for Individual Contributors. In that case, the highest amount is 20% of the desired contribution salary, where the minimum cannot be less than the salary cap and the maximum is the social security cap, which in 2019 was R$5.839,45. For those who wish to contribute the minimum wage and give up the option of retiring by contribution time, there is the option of paying 11% of the minimum wage.

The Federal Law No. 12,470 of 31 August 2011 introduced a contribution rate of 5% of the minimum wage for all citizens who do not work, have no income of their own, belong to a low-income family and are registered in the Federal Government's Single Registry for Social Programs. For Individual Contributors, there is also the option of formalizing as a small business owner and becoming an Individual Microentrepreneur (MEI), so the contribution to the INSS becomes 5% of the minimum wage.

== Types of contributors ==
=== Compulsory insurance ===
Compulsory insured workers are all those listed in the Article 11 of the Federal Law 8,213 of 24 July 1991.

- Employee: in general terms, anyone who works for a company, subordinate to it, for remuneration;
- Domestic worker: anyone who works in a home, for an individual or family, on a non-profit basis;
- Freelance worker: a person who occasionally works for one or more companies, for remuneration, intermediated by a Labor Management Body or union of the category;
- Individual contributor: a person who works for one or more companies, for remuneration, on their own behalf;
- Special insured: small farmers and fishermen;

=== Optional insurance ===
Optional insured persons are those listed in the Article 11 of the Federal Decree No. 3,048 of 6 May 1999. They must be over 16 years of age and join the General Social Security System, by contributing, as long as they are not exercising a remunerated activity that qualifies them as a compulsory social security insured person. The optional member becomes insured when they pay their first contribution.

- Housewives;
- The condominium manager, when unpaid;
- Students;
- Brazilians accompanying a spouse who is working abroad;
- Those who are no longer compulsorily insured;
- Members of the guardianship council, when they are not linked to any social security system;
- Scholarship holders and trainees who provide services to a company in accordance with the Federal Law No. 6,494 of 7 December 1977;
- Scholars who dedicate themselves full-time to research, specialization, postgraduate, master's or doctoral courses, in Brazil or abroad, as long as they are not linked to any social security system;
- Prisoners who do not work for pay and are not linked to any social security system;
- Brazilians residing or domiciled abroad, unless they are affiliated to the social security system of a country with which Brazil has an international agreement;
- Insured persons in prison under a closed or semi-open regime, who, in this condition, provide services, inside or outside the penal unit, to one or more companies, with or without intermediation from the prison organization or similar entity, or who carry out artisanal activities on their own account.

== Payment of benefits ==
The INSS offers twelve types of social security benefits, one welfare benefit and two social security services. The benefits are different from the services because they are monetary, and the welfare benefits are different from the social security benefits because they do not require a contribution. These benefits are:

=== Social security benefits ===
==== Retirement pensions ====
- Age retirement pension: urban male workers are entitled to this benefit at the age of 65 and female workers at the age of 60. Rural workers can apply for old-age retirement at five years younger: at 60 for men and 55 for women. To claim the benefit, urban workers registered after 25 July 1991 must prove 180 monthly contributions. Rural workers have to prove, with documents, that they have worked in the countryside for 180 months;
- Disability retirement pension: benefit granted to workers who, due to illness or accident, are considered incapable by the INSS medical examination to exercise their activities or another type of service that ensures their survival;
- Retirement for contribution time: it can be full or proportional. To be entitled to a full pension, a male worker must have at least 35 years of contributions and a female worker must have 30 years. To apply for proportional retirement, the worker has to combine two requirements: contribution time and minimum age. According to Constitutional Amendment No. 20 of 15 December 1998, men can apply for proportional retirement at 53 years of age and 30 years of contributions, plus an additional 40% on the time remaining on 16 December 1998 to complete 30 years of contributions, while women are entitled to proportional retirement at 48 years of age and 25 years of contributions, plus an additional 40% on the time remaining on 16 December 1998 to complete 25 years of contributions. To be entitled to full or proportional retirement, it is also necessary to fulfill the waiting period, which corresponds to the minimum number of monthly contributions required for the insured person to be entitled to the benefit. Those registered after 25 July 1991 must have at least 180 monthly contributions, while those affiliated before that date must follow the progressive table;
- Special retirement pension: benefit granted to insured workers who have worked in conditions harmful to their health or physical integrity. To be entitled to special retirement, the worker must prove, in addition to working time, effective exposure to physical, chemical or biological agents or a combination of harmful agents for the period required to grant the benefit (15, 20 or 25 years);

The loss of insured status will not be taken into account for the granting of retirement for length of service. Retirement for contribution time, age and special retirement are irreversible and cannot be waived: once they have received their first payment, withdrawn the PIS or the Guarantee Fund (whichever comes first), they cannot give up the benefit. Workers do not have to leave their jobs to apply for retirement.

==== Benefits ====
- Sickness benefit: granted to insured people who are unable to work due to illness or accident for more than 15 consecutive days. In the case of workers with a formal contract, the first 15 days are paid by the employer and the INSS pays from the 16th day of absence from work. In the case of individual contributors (entrepreneurs, freelance workers, among others), the Social Security system pays for the entire period of the illness or accident (as long as the worker has applied for the benefit). To be entitled to it, the worker must contribute to Social Security system for at least 12 months; this period will not be required in case of an accident of any kind (whether an accident at work or outside of work). The granting of the benefit and the number of assisted months is established by the INSS after a medical examination;
- Accident benefit: paid to workers who suffer an accident and are left with sequelae that reduce their ability to work. It is granted to insured people who were receiving sickness benefit. Employees, freelance workers and special insurers are entitled to accident benefit. Domestic workers, individual and optional contributors do not receive the benefit;
- Imprisonment benefit: the dependents of low-income insured workers who are detained for any reason are entitled to receive imprisonment benefit for the entire period of confinement. The benefit will be paid if the worker is not receiving a salary from the company, sickness benefit, retirement or in-service allowance. The Federal Law No. 13,846 of 18 June 2019 included the Item IV in the Article 25 of the Law No. 8.213 of 1991, instituting a grace period of twenty-four monthly contributions for the insured's dependents to be entitled to the benefit, in addition to requiring that the insured be imprisoned in a closed regime, with the semi-open regime no longer being allowed;

==== Salaries ====
- Maternity allowance: workers who contribute to Social Security system are entitled to maternity allowance for the 120 days they are away from work due to childbirth, pregnancy or breastfeeding. The amount paid is generally the same as the salary the worker was receiving before she took time off, although it can vary depending on the country or region you are in. The benefit is also extended to adoptive mothers. Employed workers are entitled to maternity allowance, while freelance or informal workers can receive a maternity benefit, which is a fixed amount paid by the government;
- Children's allowance: additional amount to the family income granted for children under 14 who attend school. This benefit is paid to workers with a monthly salary of up to R$862,60 to help support children up to the age of 14 who are incomplete or disabled;

==== Pensions ====
- Death pension: benefit paid to a worker's family when he or she dies. There is no minimum contribution period for a death pension, but the accident must have occurred while the worker was insured;

=== Welfare benefit for the elderly and disabled ===
They are commonly referred to as Loas (in reference to the law that regulates it, the Organic Law on Social Assistance), or BPC (Continuous Benefit). It is paid to people who cannot afford to contribute to the Social Security system. Elderly people aged 65 and over who are not in paid work and without any other pensioners in the family, and disabled people who are unable to work and live independently are entitled to social assistance.

One of the criteria for obtaining the benefit is proof of a per capita family income of less than or equal to 1/4 of the minimum wage per person. This benefit is funded by Social Assistance, not Social Security, so it is not a contributory benefit, although it is administered by the Ministry of Social Security.

=== Social security services ===
- Professional rehabilitation: form of educational assistance and professional adaptation with the purpose of providing the means to re-enter the labor market for beneficiaries who are partially or totally incapacitated for work, regardless of need, and for people with disabilities;
- Social services: a program that assists all insured people, dependents and other Social Security users. The citizen will be attended by a Social Worker, who will clarify their social rights and the appropriate way to exercise them, as well as seeking solutions to problems that arise in the citizen's relationship with the INSS. It is also responsible for carrying out the Social Assessment, which is part of the analysis for granting the Continuous Benefit (BPC) for People with Disabilities and Retirement for People with Disabilities.

== Suspected irregularities ==
An audit carried out by the Federal Court of Accounts (TCU), published in October 2009, raised suspicions about 3.2 million benefits; 2 million were granted without the beneficiary's CPF being registered and 1.2 million were provided to people with abbreviated names, which could facilitate fraud. There are 31,285 cases of the same CPF receiving three or more pensions and 1,827 benefits granted to people who have already died. There are also 3,700 benefits paid in excess of the legal limit, although the TCU recognizes that there are some specific laws, such as for ex-combatants, in which it is possible to receive a subsidy above the limit.

== See also ==
- Ministry of Labour and Employment
- Social security in Brazil
