= Serviço Federal de Processamento de Dados =

Brazilian IT services public company

Serviço Federal de Processamento de Dados (Serpro)
- Type: Government-owned corporation
- Industry: Computer software, IT services, IT consulting
- Founded: December 1, 1964; 61 years ago
- Headquarters: Brasília, Brazil
- Number of locations: Regionals: Brasília, Belém, Belo Horizonte, Curitiba, Fortaleza, Florianópolis, Porto Alegre, Recife, Rio de Janeiro, Salvador, São Paulo
- Key people: Wilton Itaiguara Gonçalves Mota (CEO); Wallyson Lemos dos Reis Oliveira (COO), Alexandre Brandão Henriques Maimoni (CHRO, DLA), Osmar Quirino da Silva (CFO, MD), Ermes Ferreira Costa Neto (BDGA), Ariadne de Santa Teresa Lopes Fonseca (BDETA)
- Revenue: ▲ R$ 2.78 billion (2021)
- Net income: ▼ R$ 390.9 million (2021)
- Total assets: ▲ R$ 4.39 billion (2021)
- Number of employees: 7,822 (2021)
- Website: http://www.serpro.gov.br

Serviço Federal de Processamento de Dados (Federal Data Processing Service), or Serpro, is the biggest government-owned corporation of IT services of Brazil. It was created by Law n. 4.516, of December 1, 1964 to modernize and give agility to strategic sectors of public administration. It is a company linked to the Ministry of the Economy of Brazil and develops software and services to increase control and transparency of government revenue and government spending.
