= Trófeu Raça Negra =

Brazilian award for Afro-Brazilians

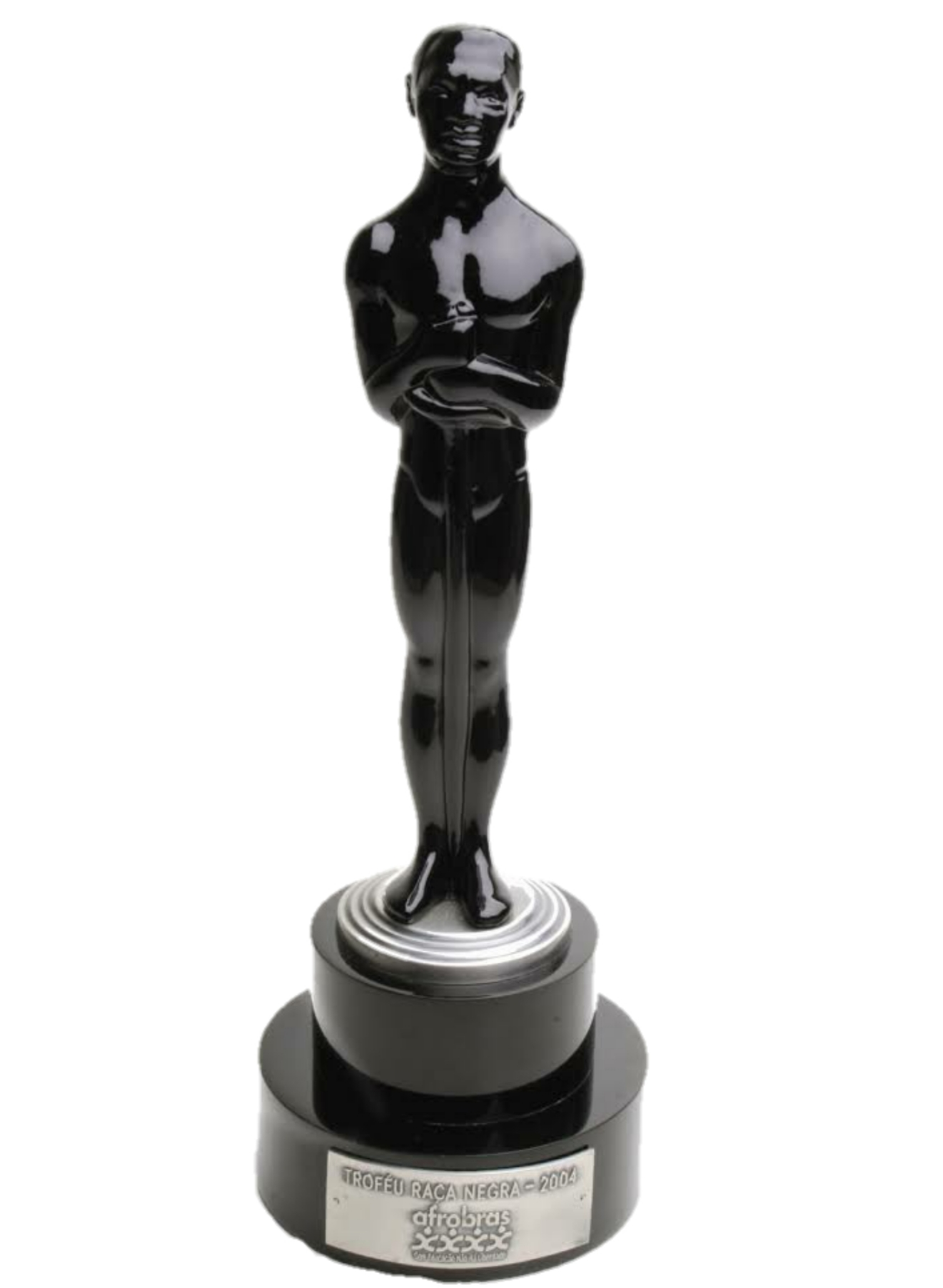
Trófeu Raça Negra

The Trófeu Raça Negra (Black Race Trophy) is a Brazilian award which is handed out to individuals and groups who have contributed or exhibited advancements for Afro-Brazilians. Organized by the NGO Afrobras, it was first handed out in 2000 on the 500th anniversary of the European arrival in Brazil, and has been held annually since 2004. It is similar to the NAACP Image Award in the United States.

== Recipients ==
=== 2023 ===
The theme was dedicated to Gloria Maria, television journalist.

- Ailton de Aquino, Director of the Central Bank
- Alaide Costa, Singer and Composer
- André Felicissimo, President of Procter and Gamble of Brasil
- Barbara Reis, Actress
- Claudinho Oliveira, São Paulo Police Ombudsman
- Denisio Liberato, President of Bb/ Asset Management
- Djamila Ribeiro, Philosopher, black feminist, writer and academic
- Edinho, Coach and former footballer, Son of Pelé
- Eliza Lucinda, Actress – Soap Opera
- Fernando Padula, Municipal Secretary of Education
- Gilson Ferreira, President of G10 Favelas
- Kelli Quirino, Advisor at Banco Do Brasil
- Laura and Maria, daughters of Gloria Maria
- Luís Roberto Barroso – President of the Federal Supreme Court
- Manuella Mirella Nunes Da Silva, president of the National Union of Students
- Mirela Archangelo, child reporter
- Renata Sofial, Screenwriter Rede Globo
- Reta Jo Lewis, President of Eximbank United States
- Samuel de Assis, Actor
- Sheron Menezzes, Actress
- Teofilio Barba, State Deputy, Author of the law that considers Black Awareness Day a state holiday in SP

=== 2022 ===
The theme was focused on women who have contributed to the welfare of Black women in Brazil and elsewhere.

- Aline Borges, actress
- Aline Torres, Municipal Secretary of Culture for São Paulo
- Benedita da Silva, Politician
- Dilma Rousseff, former President of Brazil
- Duda Ribeiro, singer
- Eunice Prudente, Municipal Secretary of Justice for São Paulo
- Fofão, former volleyball player
- Glaucimar Peticov, executive director of Banco Bradesco
- Graça Machel, humanitarian activist, widow of Samora Machel and Nelson Mandela
- Inês Maria Coimbra, State Attorney General for São Paulo
- Lu Alckmin
- Luiza Helena Trajano, chair of Magazine Luiza
- Maria Alice Setúbal
- Marina Silva, Minister of the Environment and Climate Change
- Marta Suplicy, Secretary of International Relations for the city of São Paulo
- MC Soffia, recording artist
- Neilda Fabiano,
- Patricia Vilela, president of Humanitas360
- Paulina Chiziane, Mozambican writer
- Simone Tebet
- Sônia Silva, Student of the 1st Administration class at FAZP

=== 2021 ===
The theme honored Ismael Ivo, former director of the São Paulo City Ballet.

- Aline Torres, Municipal Secretary of Culture for São Paulo
- Aretha Duarte, 1st black Latin American woman to reach the top of Everest
- Bruna Brelaz, former president of the National Union of Students
- Christian Gebara, CEO of Telefônica Brasil
- Elizeu Soares Lopes, police ombudsman of São Paulo
- Elza Paulina de Souza, Municipal Secretary of Urban Security for São Paulo
- Eunice Prudente, Municipal Secretary of Justice for São Paulo
- Frederico Trajano, CEO of Magazine Luiza
- Fernanda Garay, Silver Medal in Volleyball Tokyo 2020
- Hebert Conceição, Gold Medal in Boxing Tokyo 2020
- Jesus Roque, Vice Mayor, Secretary of Culture of Guarulhos
- Jonathan Azevedo, Actor
- Ludmila, Singer
- Mart'nália, Singer
- Michel Temer, Former President of Brazil
- Paola Miguel, Councilor of Campinas
- Preta Gil, Singer
- Thaíde, Rapper
- Thelma Assis, doctor, television presenter
- Thiago Thobias, attorney
- Tony Gordon, Singer
- Vera Ivo, Sister of Ismael Ivo
- Wallace Martins, race driver

=== 2020 ===
- Luiz Melodia – singer-songwriter (posthumous)
- George Floyd – American victim of police brutality whose murder sparked international protests (posthumous)
- Benedita da Silva – politician
- Celso Athayde – entrepreneur and event producer
- Emicida – singer-songwriter, rapper
- Jaqueline Goes de Jesus – Biomedicalist and researcher
- Luana Génot – businesswoman and activist
- Luís Roberto Barroso – jurist, current Justice of the Supreme Federal Court, President of the Superior Electoral Court
- Luiza Helena Trajano –businesswoman
- Paulo César de Oliveira – former football referee
- Viviane Ferreira – filmmaker

=== 2019 ===
- Raul Botelho – the first black Air Force Lieutenant Brigadier and the first Commander of the Joint Staff of the Defense Ministry, the Lieutenant Brigadier.
- Érika Malunguinho – the first trans state deputy elected in Brazil, in 2018. She is also known for having created the Quilombo Urbano named Aparelha Luzia in the center of the capital.
- Dr. Pedro Luiz Sousa – delegate responsible for the arrest of the torturers of the young black man at the Ricoy Supermarket.
- Alexandra Lohas – prominent journalist and activist in 2019, former French consul.
- Miguel Haddad – federal deputy. Former mayor and pioneer in the implementation of municipal quotas for the city of Jundiaí, serving as a model for other municipalities in Brazil.
- Ricardo John – together with Zumbi, he developed the book Caixa Preta, Leão de Ouro in Cannes and institutes targets for hiring young black people at the Agency.
- Rodrigo Tortima – director of Agência Gray and directors Adriano Matos, Gustavo Zordan and students from Faculdade Zumbi dos Palmares, Vanessa Holanda, Klesley Alves, Mayra Sales and Alex Andre – together with Faculdade Zumbi launched the Machado de Assis Real Campaign, from rescue of the blackness of the great Black Writer, the campaign was awarded gold at Cannes.
- Andrea Assef – together with Zumbi, she launched the book Caixa Petra in the appreciation and visibility of the historical achievements of black people, won gold at Cannes, Director of the Thompson Agency.
- Flávia Lima – journalist, black woman occupying the post of Ombudsman of the Folha de São Paulo newspaper.
- Jacquelin Jules, Deniel Pierrot, Chrisner Louis and Evens Alce – young black Haitians (interns at Zumbi dos Palmares) hired at Banco Bradesco.
- Paulo Roberto Vieira da Silva – physician.
- João Acaiabe – actor, storyteller, one of our greatest griots, the master.
- Dexter – rapper

=== 2018 ===
- Marielle Franco – politician (posthumous)
- Mano Brown – rapper
- Valéria Lúcia dos Santos – lawyer
- Otávio Frias Filho – newspaper editor (posthumous)
- Dias Toffoli – president of the Federal Supreme Court
- Fafá de Belém – singer
- Maria Inês Fini – president of the Instituto Nacional de Estudos e Pesquisas Educacionais Anísio Teixeira
- José Gregori – former Justice minister
- Rilma Aparecida Hemetério – current judge of the Regional Labor Courts in São Paulo
- Teresa Cárdenas – Cuban writer
- Gaby Amarantos – singer
- Reinaldo – singer
- Luiz Carlos Trabuco – former president of Bradesco Bank
- Luiza Trajano – businesswoman
- Adama Dieng – former UN Special Adviser on the Prevention of Genocide

=== 2017 ===
- Zica Assis, founder of Beleza Natural
- Dr. Karen Eloise de Andrade Firne, first student at the Department of Medicine of Jundiaí
- Major Helena dos Santos Reis, First black secretary of the Casa Militar and State Coordinator of Civil Defense of the state of São Paulo
- Paulo Rogério Nunes, Publicity)
- Floriano Pesaro, representative of the Jewish community
- Marco Pellegrini, National Secretary for the disabled
- Ivan Renato de Lima, regional mayor of the neighborhood of Pirituba
- Luiz Melodia, singer (posthumous)
- João Saad, president of the Bandeirantes group
- Ícaro Silva Silva, actor
- Marcelo Knobel, dean of Unicamp (university)
- Marco Antônio Zago, dean of USP
- Maurício de Sousa, cartoonist
- Dandara Mariana, actress and dancer
- Rachel Maia, CEO of Pandora Brasil
- Ismael Ivo, Head of the ballet of the Municipal Theater of São Paulo
- Maria Helena Guimarães, of the Ministry of Education
- Jorge Carlos Fonseca, President of Cape Verde.
- Zezé Motta, actress
- João Doria, Mayor of São Paulo

The 2017 award to João Doria, however, was accompanied with controversy in the Afro-Brazilian community and press. Doria is a descendant of slave-owners in the Doria family, and his actions as mayor against touchstones of Afro-Brazilian culture such as samba and Carnaval have been perceived as racist.

=== 2016 ===
- Elza Soares, singer
- Carmen Lúcia, President of the Federal Supreme Court
- Arlindo Cruz, singer
- Raul Botelho, Lieutenant-Brigadier of Air, Brazilian Air Force
- Papa Paul Kisolokele, Religious leader in Angola
- Kim Cape, GBHEM general secretary - president of the North American investment fund of the Methodist Institute of Educational Services
- Arnaldo Niskier, writer and member of the Brazilian Academy of Letters
- Rafaela Silva, judoka winner of the gold medal in the Rio 2016 Olympics
- Cláudio Lamachia, President of the Federal Council of OAB
- Sheila Cristina Nogueira da Silva, mother of Carlos Eduardo (19 years), murdered by a bullet lost in Rio de Janeiro
- David Uip, Secretary of Health of the State of São Paulo
- Sabrina de Paiva, Miss São Paulo 2016
- Mauro Silva, Champion of the Brazilian National Team and vice-president of the Paulista Football Federation
- Rodney Williams, Vice President of Microsoft Brazil
- Raissa Santana, Miss Brazil 2016
- Francisco Macena, chief of staff of the São Paulo City Hall
- Walter Feldman President of the Paulista Football Federation
- Antônio Mosquito, Angolan businessman

=== 2015 ===
- Marcus Vinicius Furtado Coêlho, President of the National OAB
- Nilcemar Nogueira, Grandson of Cartola and creator of the Samba Museum
- José Alencar de Souza, Chef-owner of the restaurant Santo Colomba
- Maurício Pestana, Secretary for the Promotion of Racial Equality in São Paulo
- João Carlos Martins, Maestro
- Macaé Evaristo, Secretary of Education of the State of Minas Gerais
- Conceição Evaristo - Writer
- Érico Brás, Actor
- Kenia Maria - Actress
- Matheus Dias - Actor
- Gabriela Dias - Actress
- Lorival Ferreira dos Santos - Judge of the Regional Labor Court (TRT) of Campinas
- Maria Júlia Coutinho - Journalist
- Wole Soyinka - Nigerian Writer, Nobel Prize for Literature
- Martinho da Vila

=== 2014 ===
- Graça Machel, Political activist and human rights defender, widow of Nelson Mandela and Samora Machel
- Tiago Barbosa, actress
- Marcos da Costa, President of the OAB of São Paulo
- Neuza Maria Alves, first black female court judge of the Regional Federal Court of Brasilia
- Nadir de Campos Júnior, first black prosecutor of Justice of the State of São Paulo
- Yityish Aynaw, first Black Miss Israel
- Geraldo Alckmin, Governor of São Paulo
- Fernando Haddad, Mayor of São Paulo
- Antonio Pinto (Secretary of the SEPPIR (pt))
- Luis Gustavo do Nascimento, first black Attorney General of the State of São Paulo
- Vera Eunice (daughter of writer Carolina de Jesus)
- José Henrique Paim (1st Minister of Education)
- Marco Simões (honored from Coca-Cola do Brasil)
- Aranha (goalkeeper of Santos)
- Paulo Speller (dean of Unilab)
- Celso Janet (Secretary of Sports)
- Paulo Reis (Alderman of São Paulo)
- Glaucius Oliva (President of CNPQ)

=== 2013 ===
- Paulina Chiziane, Mozambican writer
- Creuza de Oliveira, president of the FENATRAD union
- Zeze Barbosa, actress
- Paulo Lins, writer
- Irene Neto, President of the Board of Directors of the Agostinho Neto Foundation, daughter of Agostinho Neto
- Larry Robinson, president of the Florida Agricultural and Mechanical University
- Jesse Jackson, U.S. civil rights activist
- Alpha Condé, first democratically elected president in Guinea
- Emílio Santiago, singer (posthumous)

=== 2012 ===
- Bernice King, daughter of Martin Luther King
- Cacau Protásio, Avenida Brasil
- Jean Paulo Santos, Carousel
- Gloria Maria
- Carlinhos Brown
- Martinho da Vila
- Racionais MC's
- Macau, composer of the song "Colored Eyes", success in the voice of Sandra de Sá)
- Renato Sorriso (gari passista)
- Fabiana Claudino - two-time Olympic volleyball champion
- Anderson - Olympic volleyball athlete
- Hélia Souza "Fofão" (Olympic champion of volleyball)
- Luiz Fux (Minister of the "Supreme Federal Court")
- Robson Rocha (vice-president of "Banco do Brasil")
- Otavio Frias Filho (Director of Editorial of the "Folha de São Paulo")
- Bishop Afonso Nunes (Angola)
- Vanda Ferreira (former Secretary of Education of the State of Rio de Janeiro)
- Luís Inácio Lucena Adams (Advocate General of the Union)

=== 2011 ===
- Best Actress - Lucy Ramos (Cordel Encantado - Rede Globo)
- Best Actor - Micael Borges (Rebelde - TV Record)
- Featured Actor - Érico Brás (Tapas & Kisses - Rede Globo)
- Humorist - Charles Henrique (TV Panic - TV Network)
- Women's Journalism - Dulcinea Novaes - Rede Globo
- Men's Journalism - Thiago Oliveira - TV Gazeta
- Featured in Journalism - Heraldo Pereira - Rede Globo
- Set of the Work - Nil Marcondes - TV Record
- Black Beauty - Silvia Novaes - Miss Italy Nel Mondo
- Trophy Homage - Ruth de Souza - actress

=== 2010 ===
- Special Award - Milton Nascimento

==== Popular Award ====
- Movie Actor - André Ramiro (Elite Troop 2)
- Movie Actress - Cris Vianna (Beetle)
- Theater - Elisa Lucinda (Stop Talking Badly of Routine)
- Actor of TV - Marcello Melo Jr (Malhação 2010)
- TV Actress - Priscilla Marinho (Fitness ID)
- Journalism - Presenter / Reporter - Heraldo Pereira (Globo)
- Journalism - Presenter / Reporter - Maria Júlia Coutinho (Globo)
- Music - Group Good Taste

==== Institutional Awards ====
Nationals

- Dias Toffoli - Minister of the Supreme Federal Court
- Eloi Ferreira - Minister of the Secretariat for Policies for the Promotion of Racial Equality
- Ricardo Lewandowski - President of the Superior Electoral Court and Minister of the Federal Supreme Court
- Antônio Pilar - Director of Core of Rede Globo
- Thogun - Actor
- Marina Miranda - Actress
- Jeferson D - Cinematographer

International

- Ana Paula dos Santos - First Lady of Angola
- David Morgan - Vice President of Government Relations at American Express
- Dr. Jerome King Del Pino - World General Secretary of Methodist Institutions
- Dr. Ken Yamada - Special Assistant to the General Secretariat and in charge of the Methodist Fund for Global Education and Leadership Development

=== 2009 ===
==== Popular Vote ====
- Actor of the Year: Rafael Zulu (Caco, de Caras & Bocas, Globo)
- Actress of the year: Juliana Alves (Suellen, from Caminho das Índias, Globo)
- Television Journalism: Joyce Ribeiro (Jornal do SBT, SBT)
- Presenter of the Year: Alexandre Henderson (Globo Ciência, Globo)
- Male athlete: Adriano (Flamengo soccer player)
- Female Sportswoman: Marta (Santos soccer player)
- Pagan Group: Exaltasamba
- Singer: Alexandre Pires
- Singer: Vanessa da Mata
- Rap: Marcelo D2

==== Whole of the Work ====
- Elza Soares
- Leny Andrade
- Zezé Motta
- Osvaldinho da Cuíca
- Mestre Tadeu
- Paulinho da Viola
- Martinho da Vila
- Journalist Gloria Maria
- Journalist Ana Paula Padrão
- Roberto Carlos - Storyteller
- Taís Araújo

==== Artist of the Year ====
- Seu Jorge

==== Special Award ====
- Manoel Carlos, for the black cast placed in the novel Viver a Vida.

==== Institutional Category ====
- José Serra - Governor of São Paulo
- Lázaro Brandão - chairman of the Board of Directors of Bradesco
- Orlando Silva - Minister of Sports
- Juca Ferreira - Minister of Culture
- Edson Santos - Minister of Racial Equality
- Luciano Coutinho - President of BNDES
- Julio Cesar Alves de Oliveira - President of Banco do Brasil Vehicles
- José Lima - President of Petrobras Distribuidora
- Helio dos Santos - Mayor of Campinas
- Nelson Narciso - Director of the National Petroleum Agency
- Vereadora Olívia Santana

=== 2008 ===
Sportsman of the Year Category

- Maurren Higa Maggi, athlete, Gold Medal Salto Distance in Beijing

Category International

- Larry Palmer - President of the Inter-American Foundation
- Billy Paul - North American singer

Revelation Category

- Fabrício Boliveira, actor

Institutional Category

- Adriano Lima - Itaú Representing President Roberto Setúbal
- Benedito Gonçalves, Minister of STJ
- Clifford Sobel, Ambassador of the USA
- Cristovam Buarque, Senator
- Edgar Martolio, editor of Caras Magazine
- Edson Santos, Minister of Seppir
- Erickson Gavazza, Judge
- Fabio Barbosa, President of Banco Santander in Brazil
- Fernando Haddad, Minister of Education
- Gabriel Jorge Ferreira - Unibanco Representing President Pedro Salles
- Gilberto Kassab - Mayor of the City of São Paulo
- José Luis Bueno - Director Human Resources Bradesco
- José Sarney, Senator
- Laura Gold - American consul representing the American Consulate in honor of Barack Obama, who also received a congratulatory plaque for his election
- Mário Hélio Souza - President of Fundação Bradesco
- Miguel Jorge, Minister of Industry, Commerce and Development
- Nélio Alfano Moura, physical trainer of Maurren
- Ruth Guimarães, Writer

Lifetime work

- Carlos Ayres Britto, Minister of Supreme Federal Tribunal
- Daiane dos Santos, athlete
- Erickson Gavazza, Judge
- Jamelão Neto, grandson of Jamelão
- Joaquim Barbosa, Minister of STF
- Marcelo Paixão - State University of Rio de Janeiro, deputy director of Graduation
- Maria Helena Guimarães, Secretary of Education of the State of São Paulo
- Milton Gonçalves, actor
- Netinho de Paula - Cantor, Alderman elected São Paulo
- Orlando Silva - Minister of Sports
- Sandra de Sá - Singer
- Zezé Motta, actress

=== 2007 ===
Popular Vote

- Writer: Valquíria Ribeiro (novel "Opposite Lives") / Sheron Menezes (novel "Duas Caras" - Special Tribute)
- Humor: Sérgio Lorosa (program "A diarist")
- Singer (female): Category not announced
- Singer (male): Jairzinho
- ACTOR: Déo Garces (novel "Paths of the Heart")
- Actress of the Year: Camila Pitanga (novel "Tropical Paradise")
- Actress of the Year: André Ramiro (film "Tropa de Elite")
- Sportsperson of the Year: Diogo Silva (Taekwondo)

Institutional Categories

- Mac Maharaj, Former guerrilla fighter at the African National Congress against Apartheid and former South African Transport Minister
- Benedito Gonçalves - Jurist Federal Judge of the Second Federal Court of the State of Rio de Janeiro
- Benedita da Silva - Former governor of Rio de Janeiro
- Matilde Ribeiro - Minister of the Special Secretariat for Policies for the Promotion of Racial Equality (SEPPIR)
- Janete Rocha Pietá - Federal Deputy
- Almir de Souza Maia - Former Rector of the Methodist University of Piracicaba - creator of the first project of inclusion of blacks in higher education and partner of Unipalmares
- Orlando Silva Junior - Minister of Sports
- José Vicente, president of Afrobras - Sociedade Afrobrasileira de Desenvolvimento Socio Cultural and dean of Unipalmares - University of Citizenship Zumbi dos Palmares

=== 2006 ===
- Emilson Alonso, president of HSBC
- Márcio Cypriano, president of Febraban (Brazilian Federation of Banks) and Bradesco
- Janete Pietá, elected federal deputy
- Fernando Haddad, Minister of Education
- Lygia Santos, president of MIS-RJ (Museum of Image and Sound of Rio de Janeiro)
- Robson Caetano, athlete

Popular Vote

- Actress - Elisa Lucinda (Life Pages)
- Actor - Ronnie Marruda (Soul Mate)
- Sambista - Jorge Aragão / Ivone Lara (Special Feature)
- Cantor - Léo Maia
- Singer - Paula Lima
- Humor - Alligator (The Class of Didi)
- Grupo Musical - Backyard Fund / Negritude Jr. (Special Highlight)
- Sportsman - Daiane dos Santos / Alessandra Oliveira (Special Feature)

Institutional

- Benedita da Silva - Former Governor of Rio de Janeiro
- Carlos Alberto de Paula - Minister of the Superior Labor Court
- Carlos Alberto Vieira - President of Banco Safra
- Celso Luiz Limongi, president of the São Paulo Court of Justice
- Chico Pinheiro - Journalist
- Cristopher McMullen - United States Consul General
- David Uip, executive director of Incor (Heart Institute)
- Eduardo Suplicy - Senador-SP
- Eunice Prudente - Secretary of Justice and Defense of Citizenship of the State of São Paulo
- Gabriel Jorge Ferreira, president of the National Confederation of Financial Institutions
- Glaucia Marote Ferro - Director of the Alumni Group
- Gustavo Petta, president of UNE (National Union of Students)
- João Carlos di Genio, president of the Objective and Unip
- Joaquim Benedito Barbosa Gomes - Minister of the Supreme Federal Court
- Luiz Fux, minister of the STJ (Superior Court of Justice)
- Luiz Antonio Marrey, Secretary of Legal Affairs of the City of São Paulo
- Massami Uyeda - Minister of the Supreme Court of Justice
- Matilde Ribeiro - Minister of Seppir - Special Secretariat for Policies to Promote Racial Equality
- Milú Villela, president of the Instituto Fazer Parte and the MAM (Museum of Modern Art)
- Orlando Silva Jr., Minister of Sports
- Octavio Frias de Oliveira, President of the Grupo Folha de S.Paulo
- Sandra Lia Simón, attorney general of the Federal Public Labor Ministry
- Vicente Paulo da Silva, federal deputy

Highlights 2006

- Taís Araújo and Lazaro Ramos (Cobras & Lagartos) - Actors

Posthumous Homage

- Sandra Nascimento - Vereadora - Santos

=== 2004 ===
- CANTOR: Luis Melodia
- CANTORA: Luciana Mello
- SAMBISTA: Lecí Brandão
- MUSICAL GROUP: Black and White Quintet
- POLITICAL CAREER: Paulo Paim
- ACTOR: Rocco Pitanga (novel "Da color do Pecado") and Lázaro Ramos (movie "My uncle killed a face")
- ATRIZ: Taís Araújo (novel "Da cor do Pecado") and Isabel Fillardis (novel "Beginning of New")
- REVELATION: Adriana Alves (soap opera "Celebrity") and Preta Gil (singer)
- SPORTS OF THE YEAR: Daiane dos Santos

=== 2000 ===
- Alceu Collares
- Albuíno Azeredo
- Camila Pitanga
- Antonio Pitanga
- Ruth de Souza
- Vincente
- Edvaldo Brito
- Zezé Motta
- Joãozinho Trinta
- Pelé
- Marta Sobral
- Viviane Porto
- Jorge Lafond
- Nelson Xavier
- Paulinho da Viola
