= Trajano =

Trajano is a surname and given name. Notable people with the name include:

- Trajano Boccalini (1556–1613), Italian satirist
- José Trajano (born 1946), Brazilian journalist and writer
- José Trajano Mera (1862–1919), Ecuadorian poet, playwright and diplomat
- Archimedes Trajano (1956–1977), Filipino student activist
- Frederico Trajano (born 1976), CEO of Brazilian retail company Magazine Luiza
- Luiza Trajano (born 1948), Brazilian billionaire businessperson
- Tagore Trajano, lawyer and professor from Salvador, Bahia, Brazil

== See also ==
- Trajano de Moraes, municipality in the Brazilian state of Rio de Janeiro
- Ara de Trajano, Roman inscription on a granite boulder in Caldas das Taipas, Braga District, Portugal, dated 103
- Brazilian cruiser Trajano, a cruiser-type warship belonging to the Imperial Brazilian Navy from 1873
