= Adriana Alves =

Adriana Alves may refer to:

- Adriana Alves (sprinter)
- Adriana Alves (actress)
