= Political ineligibility of Jair Bolsonaro =

Presidential eligibility of Jair Bolsonaro

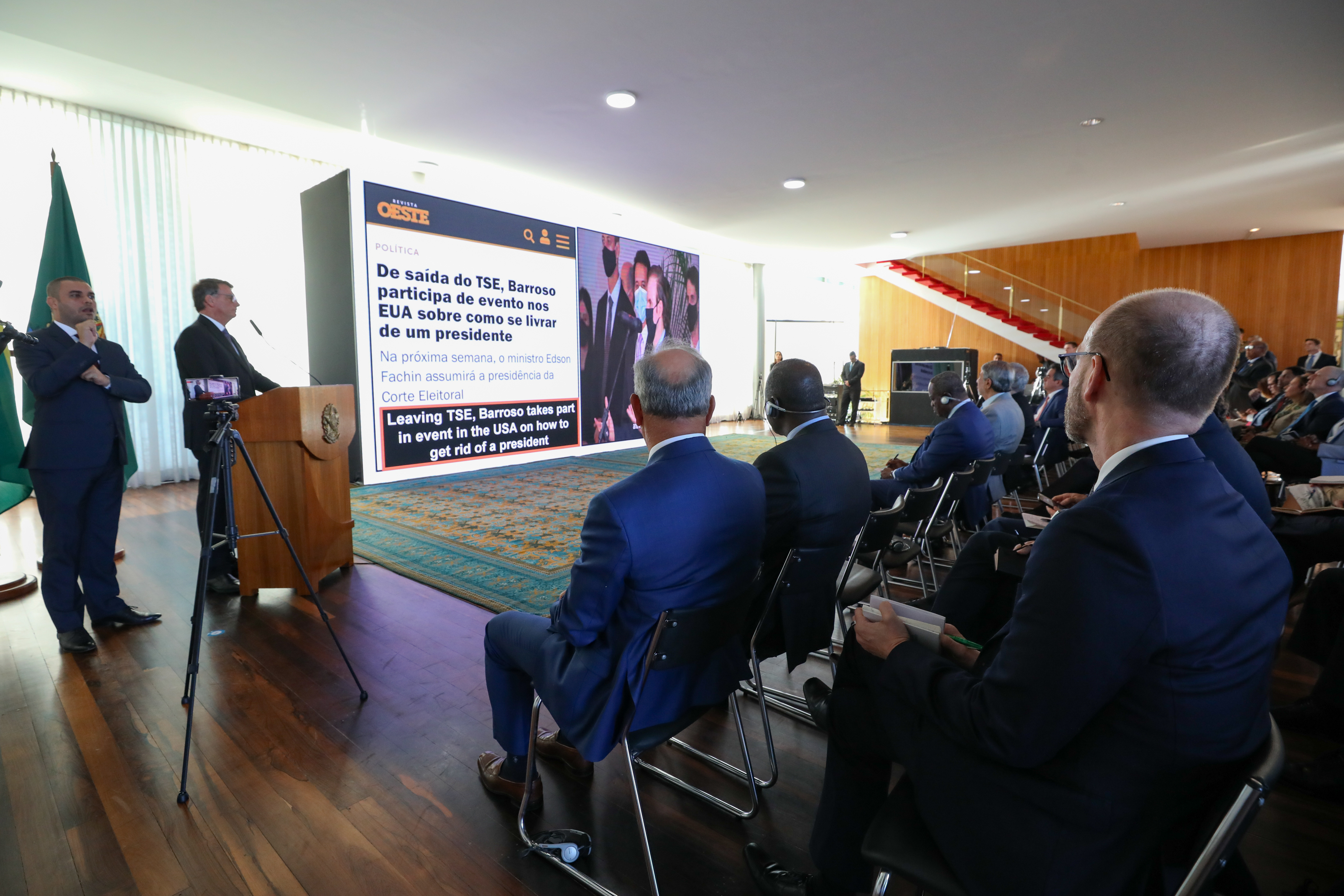
- Bolsonaro during a meeting with foreign ambassadors
- Court: Superior Electoral Court
- Full case name: Ação de Investigação Judicial Eleitoral 0600814-85.2022.6.00.0000 (Democratic Labour Party v. Jair Bolsonaro and Walter Braga Netto)
- Decided: 30 June 2023

Court membership
- Judges sitting: President: Alexandre de Moraes; Justices: Raul Araújo; Floriano de Azevedo; Benedito Gonçalves; Cármen Lúcia; Nunes Marques; André Ramos Tavares

Case opinions
- Decision by: Gonçalves
- Concurrence: Azevedo, Lúcia, Moraes, Tavares
- Dissent: Araújo, Marques

Keywords
- Electoral fraud allegations

Between 22–30 June 2023 Brazil's Superior Electoral Court (TSE) tried a lawsuit to determine the annulment of the Bolsonaro-Braga Netto ticket, accused of abuse of political power and misuse of the media, following a meeting with foreign ambassadors on 18 July 2022, broadcast on TV Brasil, Brazilian state television broadcaster, in which then-president Jair Bolsonaro attacked the Brazilian electoral system. The lawsuit was filed by the Democratic Labor Party (PDT) on 19 August 2022. Bolsonaro was declared ineligible until 2030 by 5 votes to 2 on June 30. On 31 October 2023, former vice-presidential candidate Walter Braga Netto also became ineligible, for abuse of political and economic power in the celebrations of the Bicentenary of Independence.

== Background ==
=== Running for re-election ===
Jair Bolsonaro's 2022 presidential campaign was made official on 24 July 2022, at the Ginásio do Maracanãzinho in the city of Rio de Janeiro. The vice-presidential candidate was Walter Braga Netto as the candidate of the federation. On October 2, voting in the first round, his opponent Lula came first with 48.43% of the electorate. Bolsonaro qualified for the second round by receiving 43.20% of the vote. On October 30, the second round vote, Bolsonaro was defeated by Lula, obtaining 49.10% while his rival obtained 50.90%. Bolsonaro became the first president to fail to be re-elected since the institution of re-election in 1997 and Lula was the first president to be elected by direct vote three times.

=== Meeting with ambassadors ===
Bolsonaro's meeting attacking the Brazilian electoral system with the presence of ambassadors

Even before his election to the presidency, Jair Bolsonaro became a staunch critic of Brazil's electronic ballot boxes. In 2015, when he was a federal deputy, he was the author of a constitutional amendment bill, approved by the Chamber of Deputies, which provided for printed ballots in the country. This amendment was later overturned by the Supreme Federal Court (STF) and was not implemented in the 2018 elections, on the grounds that it could create a risk of a breach of secrecy and freedom of choice, due to the possibility of poll workers having to intervene in the event of a printing failure. In the context of the 2022 presidential elections, Bolsonaro and his supporters adopted the tactic of questioning the electronic ballot boxes to question the legitimacy of the elections if he was defeated.

On 18 July 2022, during a meeting with ambassadors, Jair Bolsonaro spread conspiracy theories about the electronic ballot boxes and reused untrue statements made in previous years and previously contested by electoral bodies. Among the assertions denied by the press and the Superior Electoral Court (TSE), Bolsonaro claimed that a hacker had access to the TSE system and could manipulate the electronic ballot boxes; that the TSE did not collaborate with the Federal Police (PF) investigation; that an audit, hired by the Brazilian Social Democracy Party (PSDB) in 2014, had concluded that the electronic ballot boxes are "inaudible"; that international observers could not guarantee the legitimacy of the election; that the re-totaling of votes would be done by a third-party company; that the TSE did not accept suggestions from the Armed Forces; that the electronic ballot box would complete the vote with the number "3", as soon as the voter pressed the number "1", so that the vote "13" would be counted for the opposition candidate. He also attacked the STF ministers, said that Fachin had been a lawyer for the Landless Workers' Movement (MST) and that Barroso had given a lecture entitled "How to get rid of a president", claims that were also denied. He also tried to delegitimize the TSE, saying of the court: “it's more than Swiss cheese, it's a sieve”. According to the American newspaper The New York Times, the meeting raised international concern about a possible coup d'état in Brazil, as Bolsonaro suggested that the solution to the problems pointed out would be to intensify the military's involvement in the electoral process. The meeting was broadcast by the country's state broadcaster, TV Brasil, and by official profiles belonging to the president on social media. The New York Times compared Bolsonaro's tactics to Donald Trump 's stance in the 2020 United States presidential elections, when he tried to delegitimize the vote before it took place.

== Lawsuits ==
In June 2023, sixteen lawsuits claimed the ineligibility of Jair Bolsonaro. The lawsuits are being heard by the TSE under the supervision of judge Benedito Gonçalves and deal with abuse of political power and misuse of the media. The first lawsuit to be granted was by the Democratic Labour Party (PDT), which filed six such lawsuits accusing Jair Bolsonaro and Braga Netto of having committed electoral crimes during the meeting with ambassadors in 2022. Other lawsuits, filed by the Democratic Labor Party (PDT), the Workers' Party (PT) and presidential candidate Soraya Thronicke (UNIÃO), accuse Bolsonaro of abusing political power, by campaigning during the bicentennial Independence parades, and of abusing economic power, by using images from the parade in electoral propaganda.

=== Lawsuit filed by the PDT ===
After the meeting with the ambassadors, on 19 August 2022, the PDT asked the TSE to annul the Bolsonaro-Braga Netto slate and to delete the videos of that meeting, which were posted on social media. In an injunction, the Corregidor-General of the Electoral Justice ordered the videos to be removed in August. The PDT also asked the TSE to annul the Bolsonaro-Braga Netto slate and to delete the videos of that meeting, which were posted on social media.

On 22 June 2023, the trial began. Benedito Gonçalves, corregidor-general of the Electoral Justice and rapporteur of the case, read the report related to the case for two hours. The PDT's lawyer, Walber Agra, then presented the prosecution's arguments, after which the defendants' lawyer, Tarcísio Vieira, had the opportunity to speak. The trial was adjourned after the opinion of the Electoral Public Prosecutor's Office (MPE) was presented. On 27 June, Benedito Gonçalves voted for conviction. After his vote, the TSE adjourned the session, which was to resume two days later.

The trial resumed on 29 June with the vote of Raul Araújo, who was against conviction for Bolsonaro. Some of the ministers even interrupted him to challenge his quotes. The next to vote was Floriano Marques, and the last, André Ramos Tavares, both in favour. After that, the session was suspended. It resumed on 30 June with Cármen Lúcia and Alexandre de Moraes voting in favour and Nunes Marques against. By a vote of 5 to 2, it was decided that the candidate was illegible for a period of eight years, from the date of the 2022 elections.

=== TCU investigation ===
Following the judgment of the lawsuit filed by the PDT, the TSE sent a representation to the Tribunal de Contas da União (TCU) to evaluate the expenses involved in the meeting with the ambassadors and investigate possible damage to the treasury. If Bolsonaro's accounts are disapproved, it is possible that he will fall under the Ficha Limpa Law and his ineligibility will be extended until 2031, which would make it impossible for him to participate in the 2030 general elections. In addition, it is possible that Bolsonaro will be fined and forced to reimburse the costs.

== Repercussion ==
The decision was reported internationally in the world's leading newspapers, including the Americans NBC and The Washington Post, the Portuguese Diário de Notícias, the British BBC, the Spanish El País and the German Deutsche Welle.

After the decision, the former president said that he had been "stabbed in the back", in reference to the attack in the 2018 presidential elections, when Bolsonaro was stabbed in the abdomen.

=== Amnesty bill by the Chamber of Deputies ===
Even before the TSE ruling, Jair Bolsonaro and his allies were looking for strategies to reverse the decision. Firstly, federal deputy Ubiratan Sanderson (PL) filed a bill that aims to grant amnesty to those convicted of political crimes since 2016, which would include, in addition to Jair Bolsonaro, Deltan Dallagnol, who was removed under the Ficha Limpa Law months after taking office as a federal deputy. For the amnesty to be approved, the bill must be approved by the Chamber of Deputies and the Federal Senate, as well as being sanctioned by the President of the Republic, Luiz Inácio Lula da Silva, Jair Bolsonaro's main political rival.

However, any law, including amnesties, passed by Congress is still subject to the constitutional review by the Supreme Court if plaintiffs file a suit.

== See also ==
- Presidential eligibility of Donald Trump
