= Besouro Mangangá =

Capoeirista from Bahia

- Born: 1895; Santo Amaro, Bahia
- Died: 1924; Santo Amaro, Bahia
- Other name: Manoel Henrique Pereira
- Occupation: Worker
- Known for: legendary capoeira fighter

Manoel Henrique Pereira (c. 1895 in Santo Amaro, Bahia – c. 1924 in Santo Amaro, Bahia), known as Besouro Mangangá was a legendary Brazilian capoeira fighter from Bahia who ran capoeira school in Santo Amaro at the beginning of the 20th century.

Besouro was a dangerous faquista, highly skilled in knife fight, and known to play with a straight razor using his foot. Besouro was murdered quite young in 1924 in the Maracangalha camp, in the Santa Casa de Misericórdia of Santo Amaro.

Shortly after his death, Besouro became a mythical capoeira hero. Its fame reached the national level from the 1930s and, with the expansion of capoeira to other continents, it became international.

Besouro was the teacher of capoeira mestre Cobrinha Verde.

== Biography ==
Besouro Mangangá was the son of Maria José and João Matos Pereira, born in 1895. He was a native of the Bahian recôncavo and lived in that region, during a period when the sugarcane fields flourished in Santo Amaro, they played an important role in the productive scenario, through the sloops along the subaé river they took the goods that went to and arrived at the pier in Salvador.

=== Capoeira career ===
Manoel Henrique, who, from an early age, learned the secrets of capoeira from Mestre Alípio in Trapiche de Baixo, was baptized as Besouro Mangangá because of the belief of many who said that when he got into a conflict where the number of enemies was too great to be able to beat them, he would turn into a beetle and fly away. Several legends arose around Besouro to justify his deeds; the main one attributes to him the "closed body" (corpo fechado) and imperviousness to bullets and daggers. Due to his supposed powers, the Beetle Mangangá became a mythological character for capoeira practitioners, having his identity related to bullies, cappadocians and rascals.

It is speculated that he disliked the police and had several confrontations with their forces, sometimes gaining the upper hand in the clashes. However, according to Antonio Liberac Cardoso Simões Pires:

His practices cannot be associated with banditry, because Besouro has always characterized himself as a worker throughout his life, never being arrested for theft or ordinary criminal activity. His arrests were related to actions against the police, especially while he was in the army.

Some historical documentation records the confrontations between Besouro Mangangá and the police, such as what happened in 1918, in which Besouro would have gone to a police station in the neighborhood of São Caetano, in Salvador, to recover a berimbau that belonged to his group. With the agent's refusal to return the seized object, Besouro went on the attack with the help of some companions. They were unable to recover the desired berimbau, as they were repelled off by the police, who received help from a group of local residents.

=== Death ===
Nestor Capoeira wrote a legend of Besouro's death:

According to legend, an ambush was set up for him. It is said that he, himself (who could not read), carried the written message identifying him as the person to be killed, thinking that it was a message that would bring him work. Legend says he was killed with a special wooden dagger prepared during magic rituals to overcome his corpo fechado.

== In popular culture ==
The Assailant, a film adaptation of the story of Besouro, directed by João Daniel Tikhomiroff, premiered in Brazil on 30 October 2009. Besouro was played by Ailton Carmo, and the fight choreography was handled by Huan-Chiu Ku, choreographer for the fight scenes in Kill Bill.

== Literature ==
- Capoeira, Nestor (2002). Capoeira: Roots of the Dance-Fight-Game. Blue Snake Books. ISBN 978-1-58394-637-4.
- Capoeira, Nestor (2007). The Little Capoeira Book. Blue Snake Books. ISBN 9781583941980.
