= The Assailant =

2009 film directed by João Daniel Tikhomiroff

- DVD cover
- Directed by: João Daniel Tikhomiroff
- Written by: Patrícia Andrade; Bráulio Tavares; João Daniel Tikhomiroff
- Based on: Life of Besouro Mangangá
- Starring: Aílton Carmo; Jéssica Barbosa; Flávio Rocha; Irandhir Santos
- Cinematography: Enrique Chediak
- Edited by: Gustavo Giani
- Production companies: Miravista; Globo Filmes; Mixer Films; RT2A Produções Cinematográficas; Teleimage
- Distributed by: Buena Vista International
- Release date: 30 September 2009 (Brazil)
- Running time: 95 minutes
- Country: Brazil
- Language: Portuguese
- Budget: R$10 million
- Box office: R$3,803,835

The Assailant (known as Besouro in Brazil) is a 2009 Brazilian action-drama film directed by João Daniel Tikhomiroff. The film is about Besouro Mangangá, a Brazilian Capoeirista from the early 1920s, to whom were attributed some heroic and legendary deeds.

Huan-Chiu Ku, Kill Bill's choreographer, is responsible for the film's fight scenes. Its filming lasted three months in Bahia.

The film was released in Brazil on September 30, 2009 by Walt Disney Studios Motion Pictures through their Buena Vista International label.

== Plot ==
In 1924, almost forty years after slavery in Brazil is abolished, former black slaves are still oppressed by the rich. Resistance in the region of the Recôncavo Baiano is led by the elderly Mestre Alípio, master of a martial art, capoeira, used by the slaves to fight off abuse. Mestre Alípio's life has been threatened, so one of his best apprentices, Besouro, is appointed his bodyguard. However, Besouro spends all of his time playing capoeira in street circles, with the consequence that Alípio is killed by the police.

One day, Besouro is visited by a spiritual entity, Exu, who demands him worship. Trying to fight off the spirit, Besouro accidentally trashes a work fair, making the guards chase him. He jumps into a river, after which he meets a spiritual teacher, Dona Zulmira, who gives him a choker granting him corpo fechado, making him invulnerable to all attacks and weapons except by the tree known as ticum. With his new abilities, Besouro initiates a one-man guerrilla campaign against the plantations of Coronel Venâncio, the powerful army officer who oppresses Besouro's people.

Besouro's efforts earn him the enmity of his childhood friend Quero-Quero, a fellow capoeirista and a collaborator of Venâncio who believes Besouro is only worsening the situation of the local black people. Due to his stance, Quero-Quero's fiancee Dinorá leaves him, and instead goes with Besouro shortly after. A jealous Quero-Quero confronts Besouro in the jungle and fights him, but Besouro is victorious. To avenge this humiliation, Quero-Quero kills a man and incriminates Besouro, so the authorities will answer with greater force against him, and reveals to them that they can kill Besouro with a machete made of ticum wood.

Venâncio's men find Besouro and attack him, but they are initially defeated. However, the Coronel brandishes a ticum machete and slashes him, finally killing Besouro. He then goes to Dinorá and tries to rape her, but she defeats him with capoeira and flees to mourn her lover.

It's later revealed Dinorá was pregnant with Besouro's child, who is now a little boy learning capoeira under Besouro's friend Chico. The boy chooses his father's name as his own, and when Coronel Venâncio passes by him in the street, gives him a nasty stare, implying the boy will avenge his father some day.

== Cast ==
- Aílton Carmo as Besouro
- Sérgio Laurentino as Orixá Exu
- Anderson Grillo as Quero-Quero
- Sérgio Pererê as Orixá Ossaim
- Adriana Alves as Orixá Oxum
- Jessica Barbosa as Orixá Iansã/Dinorá
- Zebrinha as Orixá Ogum
- Macalé dos Santos as Master Alípio
- Flávio Rocha as Coronel Venâncio
- Irandhir Santos as Noca de Antônia
- Geisa Costa as Dona Zulmira
- Miguel Lunardi
- Antônio Fábio as Serafim
- Nilton Júnior as Cobra Criada
- Denise Correia
- Servílio de Holanda as Genival
- Leno Sacramento as Chico Canoa
