= The Last Flight of the Flamingo =

2010 film directed by João Ribeiro

- Directed by: João Ribeiro
- Screenplay by: João Ribeiro, Gonzalo Galvão Teles
- Produced by: Potenza Producciones, Fado Filmes, Carlo D’Ursi Produzioni, Slate One, Neon, Videofilmes
- Starring: Carlo D'Ursi; Elliot Alex; Alberto Magassela; Matias Xavier; Adriana Alves
- Cinematography: José Antonio Loureiro
- Edited by: Pedro Ribeiro
- Music by: Omar Sosa
- Distributed by: Insomnia World Sales
- Release date: 2010
- Running time: 90 minutes
- Countries: Brazil; France; Italy; Mozambique; Portugal; Spain
- Languages: Portuguese (Original) and Subtitled in English, Spanish and French
- Budget: 1.300.000 Euros

The Last Flight of the Flamingo is a 2010 film, based on the 2000 novel of the same name, by Mozambican writer Mia Couto.

== Synopsis ==
In the village of Tizangara, UN Blue Helmets work as peacekeepers after years of civil war. Five explosions kill five soldiers; only their helmets and their phalluses are left. Massimo Risi, an Italian Lieutenant posted in Maputo, Mozambique’s capital, arrives in the village in order to investigate the events. Assisted by Joaquim, a local translator, Massimo starts the enquiry and soon discovers that not everything is what it appears to be.
