= Alberto Magassela =

Mozambican actor

- Born: 1966 (age 59–60); Lourenço Marques (now Maputo), Mozambique
- Occupation: Actor
- Years active: 1996–present

Alberto Mateus Manja Magassela (born 1966, Lourenço Marques (now Maputo)) is a Mozambican actor based out of Portugal.

Magassela began his career as an actor in the Mutumbela Gogo acting company in Maputo. He has been based out of Portugal since 1996. He regularly collaborates with the São João National Theatre in Porto, where he premiered with the Gil Vicente play A Tragicomédia de Dom Duardos, staged by fellow actor Ricardo Pais. He currently has more than 30 theater credits, along with having worked on various Portuguese films and television shows, including films such as Light Drops and O Crime do Padre Amaro.

== Filmography ==
=== Film ===
- 1997 - Alta Saciadade
- 1997 - O Prego - Belmiro
- 2002 - Light Drops - Guinda
- 2003 - Tim Watcher - Police officer
- 2005 - Mouth to Mouth - Membro da Spark
- 2005 - Um Rio Chamado Tempo, uma Casa Chamada Terra
- 2005 - O Crime do Padre Amaro - Alberto
- 2007 - Instantes - Police officer
- 2009 - Bom Dia, África - Kiluange
- 2010 - The Last Flight of the Flamingo - Estevão Jonas
- 2012 - The Great Kilapy - Alfredo

=== Television ===
- 2014 - O Beijo do Escorpião - Rafael's cellmate
- 2015-2017 - A Única Mulher - Arsénio Kianda
