= Benedito Gonçalves =

Brazilian judge (born 1954)

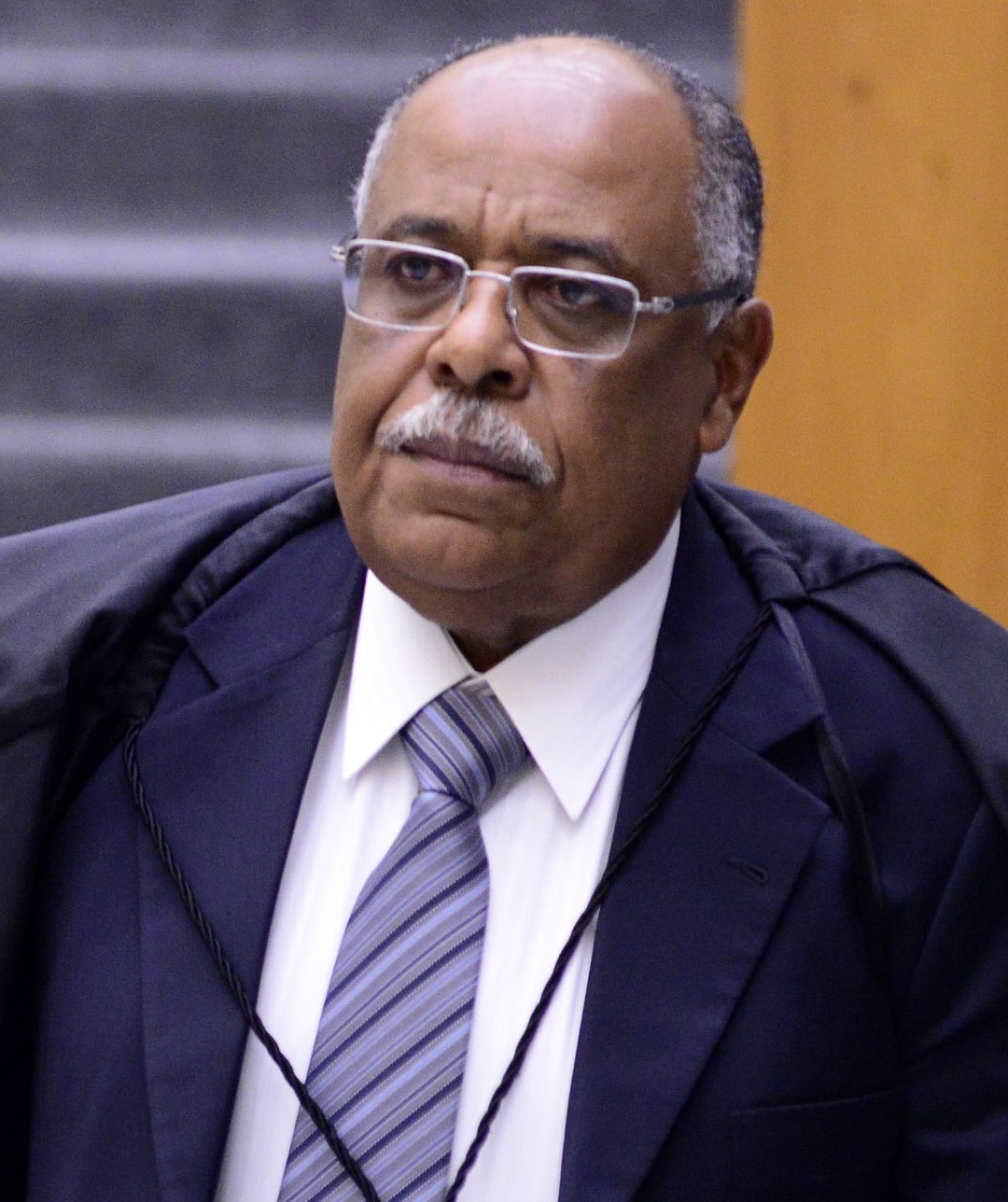

Justice of the Superior Court of Justice
- Incumbent
- Assumed office September 17, 2008
- Nominated by: Luiz Inácio Lula da Silva
- Preceded by: José Augusto Delgado

Minister of the Superior Electoral Court
- In office November 9, 2021 – November 9, 2023
- Preceded by: Luis Felipe Salomão
- Succeeded by: Isabel Gallotti

Personal details
- Born: January 30, 1954 (age 72) Rio de Janeiro, RJ, Brazil
- Education: Federal University of Rio de Janeiro
- Awards: Order of Military Merit

Benedito Gonçalves (born January 30, 1954) is a Brazilian magistrate, currently a minister of the Superior Court of Justice (STJ). He was also a minister of the Superior Electoral Court (TSE) for the 2021-2023 biennium, as well as corregidor-general of the Electoral Justice.

== Career ==
=== Academic studies and teaching ===
Gonçalves graduated in law from the Federal University of Rio de Janeiro (UFRJ) in 1978. In 1997, he specialized in civil procedure at the Center for Judicial Studies of the Federal Justice Council, in agreement with the University of Brasília (UNB), and became a master in law in 1998 at the Estácio de Sá University (UNESA), where he taught constitutional law and introduction to the study of law.

=== Police career and the judiciary ===
He worked as a papiloscopist for the Federal Police, from 1977 to 1982, and as a chief of police for the Federal District from 1982 to 1988. He entered the judiciary as a federal judge in 1988, and was promoted on merit to the Federal Regional Court of the 2nd Region (TRF-2) in 1998.

As a desembergador of the TRF-2, Benedito was president of the Federal Regional Magistrates' School (Emarf), a position in which he signed an agreement with the Fundação Getúlio Vargas (FGV) for the training of magistrates.

=== Superior Court of Justice ===
Benedito Gonçalves ran for the first time for a seat on the Superior Court of Justice (STJ) in May 2004, when the seat of Justice Vicente Leal became vacant. He received only two votes and was not included in the triple list.

In April 2007, another vacancy opened up in the STJ with the retirement of Justice Jorge Scartezzini. Of the 76 competing names, Benedito Gonçalves was chosen on the first ballot, with twenty votes, making up the triple list along with judges Napoleão Nunes Maia Filho (25 votes) and Assusete Magalhães (18 votes); President Lula appointed the first-placed judge, Napoleão.

Finally, a new vacancy opened up with the retirement of Justice José Delgado in June 2008, for which 23 candidates applied. Benedito was the first name on the triple list, receiving 21 votes, followed by Assusete Magalhães (18 votes) and Isabel Gallotti (17). Lula chose Benedito on August 1, 2008. After being nominated by President Lula, Benedito was then taken to the Constitution, Justice and Citizenship Commission (CCJ) of the Federal Senate, on August 13. On August 26, the Senate approved his nomination for the position, with 57 votes in favor and only four against. Benedito took office as a minister of the Superior Court of Justice on August 28, 2008.

On August 28, 2020, he ordered the removal of the governor of Rio de Janeiro Wilson Witzel, investigated in the context of Operation Placebo, which dealt with irregularities in the contracting of field hospitals, the purchase of respirators and medicines in the context of the fight against COVID-19. The decision also banned Witzel's access to state government premises, his communication with officials and the use of services to which he was entitled in the exercise of his office, as well as a ban on contact between the other investigated parties. In the same decision, he rejected the governor's request for pre-trial detention.

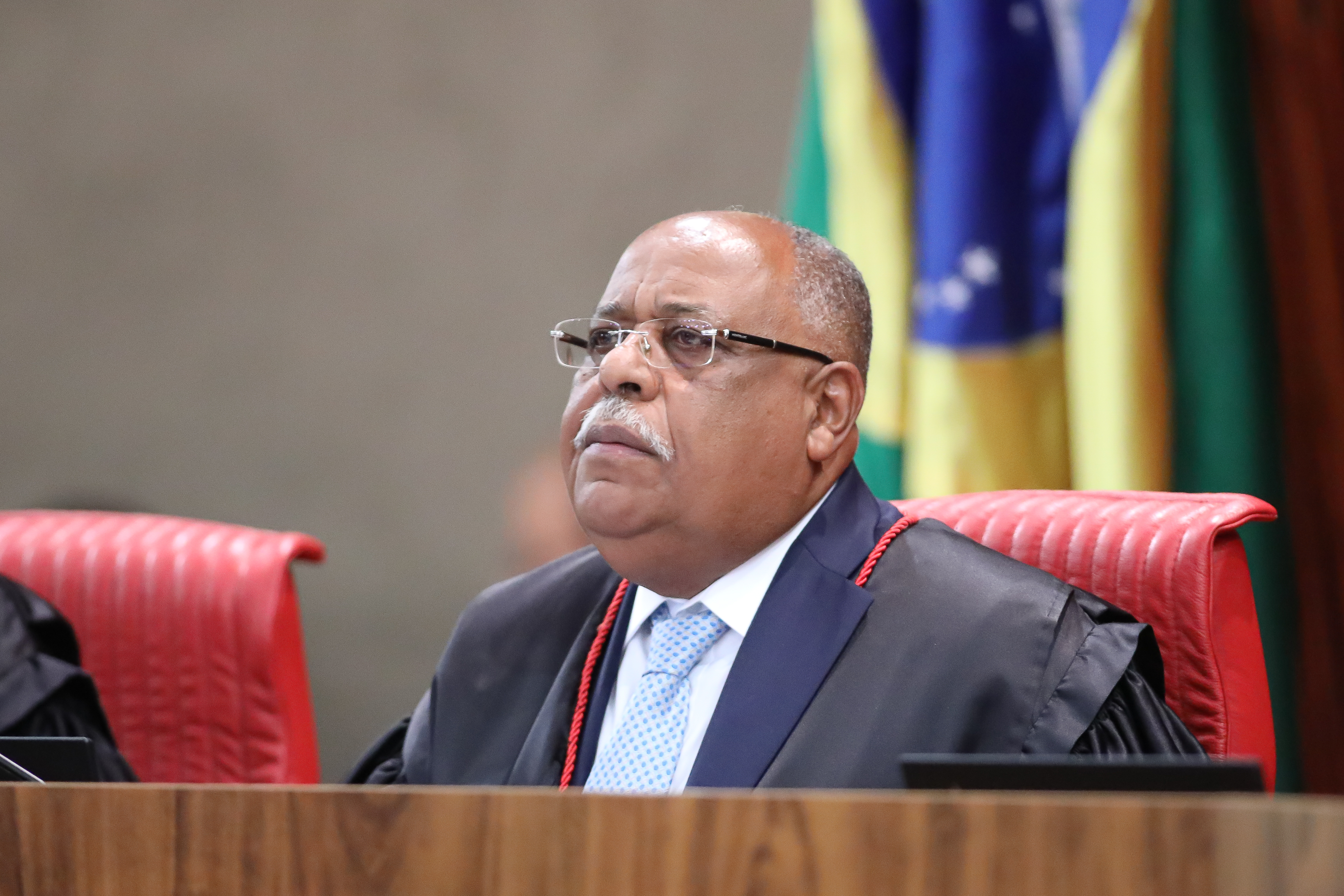
Benedito Gonçalves in session at the Superior Electoral Court (TSE) in 2023

=== Inspector General of Electoral Justice ===
On September 8, 2022, he took up the position of Corregidor General of the Electoral Justice. In the post, he was the rapporteur of the electoral judicial investigation (AIJE), judged in June 2023, which resulted in the ineligibility of Jair Bolsonaro.

He ended his term as a TSE minister on November 9. In his farewell speech, he stressed the importance of defending democracy, which he had discovered to be so fragile, and the responsibility of looking after the foundation of a just and prosperous nation, which is the Democratic Rule of Law. As he left, he was honored by fellow judges, members of the Public Prosecutor's Office and representatives of the legal profession. He was replaced by Minister Raul Araújo; according to the brazilian legal news portal Consultor Jurídico, the change meant a less interventionist stance for the body.

== Press ==
In September 2022, after TSE Minister Benedito Gonçalves banned Jair Bolsonaro's campaign from using images of the September 7 commemorative event, the date on which Brazil's independence is celebrated, as electoral propaganda, Bolsonaro's supporters circulated a fake photograph of Gonçalves wearing a red blouse with a print of Luiz Inácio Lula da Silva's face. The fake image was produced through a montage and shared on social networks.

At the beginning of January 2024, the minister's son, businessman Felipe Brandão, went viral on social media with a video in which he flaunted designer clothes and objects during a trip to Amsterdam. On January 13, the Rio de Janeiro Court of Justice ordered that the video be taken down. In her decision, judge Flávia Babu Capanema Tancredo understood that the intention of the video was to ridicule Felipe and target third parties, in this case Minister Benedito himself.
