= José Augusto Delgado =

Brazilian jurist and judge (1938–2021)

José Augusto Delgado (7 June 1938 – 8 September 2021) was a Brazilian jurist and professor who served as judge of the Superior Court of Justice (Brazil).

== Family ==
Delgado was born in São José do Campestre, Rio Grande do Norte, Brazil, the son of João Batista Delgado and Neuza Barbosa. He married Maria José Costa, and had three sons: Magnus Augusto, Federal Judge of Rio Grande do Norte, Liane Maria and Ângelo Augusto.

A graduate in law of the Universidade Federal do Rio Grande do Norte, he specialised in Civil Law and Commercial Law at the same university, in partnership with the Pontifícia Universidade Católica de São Paulo.

== Career ==
Besides having been lawyer, he was:

- Judge (1965-1976)
- Election Judge (1965-1976)
- Federal Judge (1975-1989) in Rio Grande do Norte State
- He has been member of Tribunal Regional Eleitoral of that State, where he has been also Corregedor (1978-1987)
- member of the Tribunal Regional Federal of the 5th Region (1989-1995), being its President (1992-1993), Vice-President and Corregedor (1991/1992)
- member of the Tribunal Federal de Recursos
- Finally Justice of the Superior Tribunal de Justiça (1995-2008), and of the Tribunal Superior Eleitoral.

== Academic background ==
He was professor of Criminal Law and assistant professor of Administrative Law, Procedural Law and Tax Law of the Universidade Federal do Rio Grande do Norte and professor of the Universidade Católica de Pernambuco (1992-1993). He taught in UNICEUB at post-graduate level.

== Published works ==
- Ação de Repetição de Indébito. Vox Legis, v. 14, n. 167, p. 37 – 40, nov 1982.
- Ação Declaratória e Medida Cautelar. Jurisprudência Brasileira, Cível e Comércio, n.89, p. 39-42, 1984. Revista da Amagis, v.2, n.3, p. 153-157, 1984. Revista Trimestral de Jurisprudência dos Estados, v.8, n.27, p. 25-29, abr./jun. 1984. Revista dos Tribunais, São Paulo, v.73, n.587, p. 273-276, set. 1984. Revista da Faculdade de Direito da UFG, v.7, n.1/2, p. 65-69, jan./dez. 1983. Revista Jurídica Lemi, n.207, p. 03-07, fev. 1985.
- Ação Ordinaria de Repetição de Indébito. Revista Trimestral de Jurisprudência dos Estados, v.10, n.41, p. 53-66, nov./dez.1986.
- Ação Ordinária de Reintegração de Posse Cumulada com a Anulação de Registro de Escrituras Públicas. Revista Trimestral de Jurisprudência dos Estados, v.44, p. 65-85, maio. 1985.
- Accesso à Justiça um Direito da Cidadania. Informativo Jurídico da Biblioteca Ministro Oscar Saraiva, v. 9, n. 1, p. 11 - 32, jan/jun 1997.
- Accesso à Justiça: Informatização do Poder Judiciário. Boletim de Direito Administrativo, v.12, n.3, p. 118-124, mar. 1996.
- Accesso à Justiça e Celeridade Processual, Direito da Cidadania. Revista da OAB, Seccional Paraíba, n. 02, p. 45-61, 1988.
- A Administração Pública Indireta na Constituição Federal de 1988: Alguns Aspectos. Revista dos Tribunais, São Paulo, v.77, n.635, p. 56-64, set 1988. Boletim de Direito Administrativo, v.5, n.6, p. 239-248, jun 1989. Revista Trimestral de Jurisprudência dos Estados, v.13, n.60, p. 9-23, jan.1989. Paraná Judiciário, v.28, p. 13-22, 1988. Revista do Curso de Direito da Universidade Federal de Uberlândia, v.18, n.1/2, p. 163-177, dez. 1989. Revista Forense, v.85, n.306, p. 97-104, abr./jun. 1989. Revista AJUFE, v.8, n.24, p. 27-28, 30, 32-33, 35-37, mar./abr. 1989. Síntese Trabalhista, v.7, n.79, p. 7-19, jan. 1996.
- Agência Executivas, Agência Reguladoras e Organizações Sociais: Natureza Jurídica, características e distinções destes novos entes: Contratos de Gestão conferindo maior autonomia gerencial, orçamentária e financeira. Boletim de Direito Administrativo, v. 16, n.11, p. 801-802, nov. 2000. Boletim de Direito Municipal, v.16, n.12, p. 745-766, dez. 2000. Notas: Palestras, Intervenções e Debates no 6.º Seminário Nacional de Direito Administrativo Realizado em São Paulo – SP, no dia 11.11.99, promovido pela Editora NDJ Ltda.
- Algumas controvérsias na aplicação do processo de execuçãoO. Revista de Processo, v.7, n.27, p. 144-154, jul./set. 1982. Jurídica Vox Legis, v.15, n. 177, p. 3–12, ago. 1982.
- Alguns Aspectos Controvertidos no Processo de Conhecimento. Revista Trimestral de Jurisprudência dos Estados, v.14, n.83, p. 29-39, dez. 1990. Revista dos Tribunais, São Paulo, v.80, n.664, p. 27-33, fev. 1991. Jurisprudência Brasileira, Cível e Comércio, n.161, p. 17-24, 1991. Revista Forense, v.86, n.311, p. 27-32, jul./set. 1990.
- Aplicação da Norma Constitucional. Revista da Ordem dos Advogados do Brasil. Seção do Distrito Federal, n. 10, p. 119 a 131, 1981. Vox Legis, v. 13, n. 152, p. 25 a 40, ago 1981. Revista Forense, v. 78, n. 277, p. 383 a 390, jan/mar 1982. Revista da Ordem dos Advogados do Brasil : Seção do Distrito Federal, n.10, 119-131, 1981.
- Apreciação do Mérito dos Atos Administrativos pelo Poder Judiciário. Revista de Atualidades Forenses – 1979.
- A Arbitragem: Direito Processual da Cidadania. Jurisprudência do Superior Tribunal de Justiça, v.1, n.3, p. 15-35, mar. 1999.
- A Arbitragem no Brasil: Evlução Histórica e Conceitual. Revista de Direito Renovar, n.17, p. 1-24, maio/ago. 2000. Decisório Trabalhista : Jurisprudência Trabalhista, n.113, p. 9-32, dez. 2003. Revista da Fundação Escola Superior do Ministério Público do Distrito Federal e Territórios, v.11, n.22, p. 115-147, jul./dez. 2003. Revista Forense, v.100, n.374, p. 127-142, jul./ago. 2004.
- Aspectos Controvertidos da Substituição Processual. Revista de Julgados, Tribunal de Alçada do Estado de Minas Gerais, v. 11, n.24/25, p. 37–51, jul./dez. 1985. Revista Forense, v. 83, n.298, p. 61–67, abr. / jun. 1987. Revista Processo, v.12, n.47, p. 7–16, jul./set. 1987. Jurisprudência Brasileira, Cível e Comércio, n.114, p. 13-21, 1986. Revista Trimestral de Jurisprudência dos Estados, v.12, n.51, p. 15-28, abr. 1988.
- Aspectos Constitucionais do Direito Ambiental. As Vertentes do Direito Constitucional Contemporâneo: Estudos em Homenagem a Manoel Gonçalves Ferreira Filho, Rio de Janeiro: América Jurídica, p. 197–227, 2002.
- Aspectos do Custeio da Previdência Social do Trabalhador Rural. Vox Legis, v.14, n.165, p. 31-41, set. 1982. Vox Juris Trabalhista, n.116, p. 3-14, ago. 1981. Revista Legislação do Trabalho e Previdência Social, v.45, n.6, p. 653-658, jun. 1981. Revista de Direito do Trabalho, v.6, n.33, p. 69-77, set./out. 1981. Revista Forense, v.78, n.278, p. 371-376, abr./jun. 1982. Revista LTR : Legislação do Trabalho, v.45, n.6, p. 653-658, jun. 1981.
- Aspectos Gerais das Espécies Tributárias. Revista Fórum de Direito Tributário, v.1, n.5, p. 9-39, set./out. 2003.
- Aspectos Pragmáticos da Administração Indireta. Revista Trimestral de Jurisprudência dos Estados, v.10, n.39, p. 29-42, jul./ago. 1986. Revista do Tribunal de Contas do Distrito Federal, n.13, p. 83-95, 1984.
- Aspectos Relativos às Responsabilidades do Administrador no Código Civil. Direito Tributário e o Novo Código Civil, Quartier Latim, São Paulo, p. 291–327, 2004.
- Aspectos Tributários do Tratado de Assunção. Tributação no Mercosul, Coordenador Ives Gandra da Silva Martins; Conferencista Inaugural José Carlos Moreira Alves – 2ª ed. Atual, São Paulo: Editora Revista dos Tribunais: Centro de Extensão Universitária, p. 48–73, 2002.
- Atos Admnistrtivos Elementos Poder Discricionário e o Princípio da Legalidade Limites da Convalidação, Formas de Extinção. Boletim de Direito Administrativo, v.13, n.9, p. 581-585, set. 1997.
- Autonomia e Competência Municipal na Constituição FederalL. Síntese Trabalhista, v.3, n.32, p. 24-39, fev. 1992.
- Autonomia Sindical à Luz da Nova Constituição Federal Registro de Sindicato. Revista Jurídica do Trabalho, v.2, n.7, p. 63-79, out/dez. 1989. Síntese Trabalhista, v.2, n.17, p. 14-28, nov. 1990.
- A Caracterzação do Leasing e Seus Efeitos Jurídicos. Revista Forense, v. 269, n. 919/921, p. 79-93, jan./mar. 1980.
- Características Básicas de Procedimentos Sumaríssimos. Tribunal de Justiça do Estado do Rio Grande do Norte – 1976.
- O Código do Consumidro na Jurisprudência do STJ. Jurisprudência do Superior Tribunal de Justiça, v.1, n.7, p. 21-75, jul. 1999.
- O Código Civil de 2002 e a Constituição Federal de 1998: Cláusulas Gerais e Conceitos Indeterminados. Aspectos Controvertidos do Novo Código Civil: Escritos em Homenagem ao Ministro José Carlos Moreira Alves, São Paulo: Revista dos Tribunais, p. 392–420, 2003.
- CofinsS: Estrutura Aspectos Controvertidos e Contemporâneos. Legilação Doutrina. Pis – Cofins – Questões Atuais e Polêmicas, Quartier Latim, São Paulo, p. 92–134, 2005.
- Do Contrato de Agência e Distribuição no Código de 2002. O Novo Código Civil: Estudos em Homenagem ao Professor Miguel Reale, São Paulo, p. 657–710, 2003.
- Compesação no Novo Código Civil e a Compensação Tributária. Consulex: Revista Jurídica, v.8, n.170, p. 31-32, fev. 2004.
- COMENTÁRIOS AO NOVO CÓDIGO CIVIL: DAS VÁRIAS ESPÉCIES DE CONTRATO: DO SEGURO. Forense, v. 12, Tomo I, arts. 757 a 802, 2004.
- CONTRATO DE DIREITO ADMINISTRATIVO. Revista de Direito Público, v.14, n.55/56, p. 173-182, jul./dez. 1980. Vox Legis, v.15, n.173, p. 29-36, maio 1983. Revista Forense, v. 78, n. 280, p. 41 a 54, out/dez. 1982.
- O CONTRATO NO CÓDIGO CIVIL E A SUA FUNÇÃO SOCIAL. Revista Jurídica, São Paulo, v.52, n.322, p. 7-28, ago. 2004.
- A CONTRIBUIÇÃO DA JUSTIÇA ELEITORAL PARA O APERFEIÇOAMENTO DA DEMOCRACIA. Revista do Cinqüentenário / Tribunal Eleitoral do Rio Grande do Norte (TRE-RN), v.1, n.1, p. 21-39, 1995. Revista da Procuradoria Geral da República, n.7, p. 38-48, 1994.
- O CONTROLE DA CONSTITUCIONALIDADE DAS LEIS MUNICIPAIS. Revista Trimestral de Jurisprudência dos Estados, v.19, n.132, p. 55-77, jan. 1995. Boletim de Direito Municipal, v.10, n.11, p. 593-606, nov. 1994. Revista do Curso de Direito da Universidade Federal de Uberlândia, v.23, n.1/2, p. 115-146, dez. 1994.
- A CONSTITUIÇÃO FEDERAL E O MEIO AMBIENTE. Revista da Associação dos Magistrados Brasileiros, n.09, p. 266-55, 2000.
- A CRIANÇA, O ADOLESCENTE, A FAMÍLIA E AS MUDANÇAS SOCIAIS. Jurisprudência do Superior Tribunal de Justiça, v.1, n.5, p. 31-48, maio 1999.
- O CULTO DA DEONTOLOGIA PELO JUIZ. Revista dos Tribunais, São Paulo, v.84, n.715, p. 335-341, maio 1995. Ciência Jurídica, v.9, n.63, p. 362-373, maio/jun. 1995. Revista AJUFE, v.13, n.47, p. 14-20, nov./dez. 1995. Revista Jurídica, Porto Alegre, v.43, n.214, p. 5-14, ago. 1995. Vox Lex : Jurisprudência do Superior Tribunal de Justiça e Tribunais Regionais Federais, v.7, n.68, p. 9-21, abr. 1995. Revista do Curso de Direito da Universidade Federal de Uberlândia, v.24, n.1/2, p. 204-221, dez. 1995.
- DEMOCRACIA PARA O SÉCULO XXI E O PODER JUDICIÁRIO. Revista de Direito Renovar, n.20, p. 29-41, maio/ago. 2001.
- A DEMORA NA ENTREGA DA PRESTAÇÃO JURISDICIONAL: RESPONSABILIDADE DO ESTADO, INDENIZAÇÃO. Boletim de Direito Administrativo, v.11, n.9, p. 515-532, set. 1995. Informativo Jurídico da Biblioteca Ministro Oscar Saraiva, v.10, n.2, p. 89-126, jul./dez. 1998.
- O DIREITO ADQUIRIDO NAS RELAÇÕES DE DIREITO PRIVADO E NAS RELAÇÕES DE DIREITO PÚBLICO. Jurisprudência Brasileira, Cível e Comércio, n.101, p. 13-270, 1985. Revista do Curso de Direito da Universidade Federal de Uberlândia, v.16, n.1/2, p. 121-150, dez. 1987. Revista Trimestral de Jurisprudência dos Estados, v.12, n.56, p. 15-37, set. 1988. Revista de Julgados - Tribunal de Alçada de Minas Gerais, v.10, n.20, p. 13-36, jul./set. 1984. Revista de Direito Público, v.18, n.74, p. 258-274, abr./jun. 1985.
- O DIREITO ADQUIRIDO NAS RELAÇÕES JURÍDICAS DO SERVIDOR PÚBLICO COM O ESTADO. Revista Trimestral de Jurisprudência do Estados, v.56, p. 15-37, set.1988. L&C: Revista de Direito e Administração Pública, v.4, n.32, p. 18-28, fev. 2001. Interesse Público, v.1, n.2, p. 9-29, abr./jun. 1999. Jurisprudência do Superior Tribunal de Justiça, v.1, n.1, p. 15-44, jan. 1999. Jurisprudência Brasileira, v.101, p. 13-27, 1995.
- DIREITO AMBIENTAL E COMPETÊNCIA MUNICIPAL. Boletim de Direito Municipal, v. 9, n. 2, p. 102–113, fev. 1993. Revista Forense, v. 88, n. 317, p. 151–159, jan/mar. 1992.
- O DIREITO E A EVOLUÇÃO SOCIAL DA ERA CONTEMPORÂNEA. Nomos : Revista do Curso de Mestrado em Direito da UFC, v. 11/12, n.1/2, p. 143 a 167, jan. 1992/dez. 1993.
- O DIREITO INFORMÁTICO. Doutrina Adcoas, v.5, n.11, p. 377-378, nov. 2002. Gênesis: Revista de Direito do Trabalho, v.20, n.117, p. 388-390, set. 2002. Justilex, v.2, n.13, p. 22-23, jan. 2003. Decisório Trabalhista, n.102, p. 19-22, jan. 2003.
- OS DIREITOS FUNDAMENTAIS DO CONTRIBUINTE. Revista Fórum de Direito Tributário, v.1, n.3, p. 9-68, maio/jun. 2003. Direitos Fundamentais do Contribuinte, Coordenador Ives Gandra da Silva Martins, São Paulo: Editora Revista dos Tribunais, p. 82–120, 2000.
- DESVIO DO PODER E PODER DISCRIMINATÓRIO. Boletim Interno da Seção Judiciária do Rio Grande do Norte – 1979.
- DIREITO PÚBLICO SUBJETIVO. Reflexões sobre o Pensamento Jurídico de Seabra Fagundes - Boletim Informativo da Seção Judiciária do Rio Grande do Norte – 1980.
- DIREITO TRIBUTÁRIO APLICADO A SENTENÇAS. Universidade Federal do Rio Grande do Norte, p. 119, 1979.
- DIREITO TRIBUTÁRIO NA PRÁTICA. Sentenças, Publicação com 82 páginas – 1980.
- O DIREITO E AS TRANSFORMAÇÕES SOCIAIS DA ERA CONTEMPORÂNEA. Revista da Procuradoria Geral da República, n. 2, p. 86 a 92, jan/mar 1993.
- DISCIPLINA LEGAL DA COMPENSAÇÃO TRIBUTÁRIA NA ÉPOCA CONTEMPORÂNEA. Consulex: Revista Jurídica, v.8, n.170, p. 33-36, fev. 2004. Notas: Inclui Jurisprudência do STJ Sobre Compensação.
- DOUTRINA NACIONAL. Revista de Processo, n.103, p. 09-36, jul./set. 2001.
- DO CONCEITO DE LICITAÇÃO AO SEU OBJETO. Revista Forense, v.79, n.283, p. 15-35, jul./set. 1983.
- É LIVRE A MANIFESTAÇÃO DO PENSAMENTO?. Consulex: Revista Jurídica, v.1, n.10, p. 10-15, out.1997.
- EFEITOS DA COISA JULGADA E OS PRINCÍPIOS CONSTITUCIONAIS. Jurisprudência do Superior Tribunal de Justiça, v.2, n.18, p. 75-107, jun. 2000. Revista de Direito Renovar, n.19, p. 11-39, jan./abr. 2001. Revista da Procuradoria Geral do Estado do Pará, n.4, p. 51-78, jan./jun. 2001. Revista de Direito Tributário, n.79, p. 49-69, 1999.
- EFICÁCIA DA MEDIDA CAUTELAR. Revista Trimestral de Jurisprudência dos Estados, v.19, n.139, p. 9-18, ago. 1995.
- ESTATUTO DA MULHER CASADA: EFEITOS DA LEI 4.121/62. Revista dos Tribunais, São Paulo, v.69, n.539, p. 20-24, set. 1980.
- A ÉTICA E A BOA FÉ NO NOVO CÓDIGO CIVIL. Informativo Jurídico da Biblioteca Ministro Oscar Saraiva, v.15, n.2, p. 161-177, jul./dez. 2003. Revista do Instituto dos Advogados de São Paulo, n. 02, p. 141-154, jan./jun. 2003. Revista de Direito do Consumidor, n.49, p. 164-176, jan./mar. 2004.
- A EVOLUÇÃO DO DIREITO NA ERA CONTEMPORÂNEA. Revista dos Tribunais, São Paulo, v.83, n.709, p. 264-271, nov. 1994.
- A EVOLUÇÃO CONCEITUAL DOS DIREITOS FUNDAMENTAIS E A DEMOCRACIA. Informativo Jurídico da Biblioteca Ministro Oscar Saraiva, v.12, n.2, p. 161-196, jul./dez. 2000. Revista CEJ RN, v.5, n.6, p. 7-46, dez. 1999. Revista da Procuradoria Geral do Estado do Rio Grande do Norte, n.9, p. 131-173, 2000/2001. Revista do Instituto dos Advogados de São Paulo: Nova Série, v.3, n.5, p. 11-43, jan./jun. 2000. Revista Jurídica dos Formandos em Direito da UCSAL, n. 01, p. 93–121, Bahia/2000.
- EVOLUÇÃO E CARACTERÍSTICAS DO CONTRATO DE CONCESSÃO. Seminário Jurídico, Foz do Iguaçu, Painel V, p. 115–158, junho/2001.
- EXECUÇÃO CONTRA A FAZENDA PÚBLICA: REVISÃO DOS DISPOSITIVOS CONSTITUCIONAIS; ALGUMAS CONTROVÉRSIAS. Boletim de Direito Administrativo, v.9, n.2, p. 88-97, fev. 1993. Jurisprudência Brasileira, Cível e Comércio, n.168, p. 57-68, 1993. Revista Trimestral de Jurisprudência dos Estados, v.16, n.107, p. 17-35, dez. 1992. Revista dos Tribunais, São Paulo, v.82, n.693, p. 66-76, jul. 1993. Revista Forense, v.89, n.322, p. 29-37, abr./jun. 1993. Revista Jurídica, Editora Síntese, v.42, n.197, p. 5-20, mar. 1994. Ciência Jurídica, v.8, n.56, p. 24-40, mar/abr. 1994.
- EXECUÇÃO CONTRA A FAZENDA PÚBLICA. Ciclo de Conferências para Juízes Federais, Série Cadernos do CEJ, n. 05, 1992.
- EXECUÇÃO DE QUANTIA CERTA CONTRA A FAZENDA PÚBLICA: INEXIGIBILIDADE DE PRECATÓRIO REQUISITÓRIO QUANDO SE TRATAR DE CRÉDITO DE NATUREZA ALIMENTÍCIA; ART. 100 DA CONSTITUIÇÃO FEDERAL. Revista de Previdência Social, v.14, n.114, p. 288-298, maio 1990. Revista de Processo, v.15, n.57, p. 13-23, jan/mar 1990. Síntese Trabalhista, v.6, n.62, p. 112-124, ago. 1994.
- EXECUÇÃO E EXTINÇÃO DOS CONTRATOS ADMINISTRATIVOS. Revista de Direito Público, v.15, n.62, p. 122-131, abr./jun. 1982. Vox Legis, v.16, n.193, p. 63-72, jan. 1984, Artigo em Continuação Publicado na Mesma Revista v. 16, n. 181, p. 1-10, jan. 1984.
- EXCEÇÃO DE SUSPEIÇÃO. Sentença Publicada na Revista Forense – 1968.
- FINSOCIAL: NATUREZA JURÍDICA. ADV Advocacia Dinâmica: Seleções Jurídicas, n.8, p. 3-5, ago. 1991.
- FORMAÇÃO DOS CONTRATOS ADMINISTRATIVOS. Vox Legis, v.16, n.182, p. 1-10, fev. 1984.
- O FORO POR PRERROGATIVA DE FUNÇÃO: CONCEITO E OUTROS ASPECTOS – A LEI Nº 10.628/2002 – PARTE 1. L&C: Revista de Direito e Administração Pública, v.7, n.68, p. 26-36, fev. 2004. Revista da Escola da Magistratura do Estado de Rondônia, EMERON, v.11, n.11, p. 15 – 100, 2003.
- FORO POR PRERROGATIVA DE FUNÇÃO. CONCEITO EVOLUÇÃO HISTÓRICA. DIREITO COMPARADO. SÚMULA Nº 349 DO STF. CANCELAMENTO. ENUNCIADOS. Estudos em Homenagem a Carlos Alberto Menezes Direito, p. 327–373, 2003.
- IMUNIDADE TRIBUTÁRIA – ASPECTOS CONTROVERTIDOS. Immunidades Tributárias, Editora Revista dos Tribunais, Pesquisas Tributárias, Nova Série 4, p. 54-68, São Paulo, 1998.
- IMPROBIDADE ADMINISTRATIVA: ALGUMAS CONTROVÉRSIAS DOUTRINÁRIAS E JURISPRUDÊNCIAS SOBRE A LEI DE IMPROBIDADE ADMINISTRATIVA. Direito Federal: Revista da Associação dos Juízes Federais do Brasil, v.20, n.67, p. 373-396, jul./set. 2001. Informativo Jurídico da Biblioteca Ministro Oscar Saraiva, v.14, n.1, p. 21-42, jan./jun. 2002.
- INTERESSES DIFUSOS E COLETIVOS: EVOLUÇÃO CONCEITUAL: DOUTRINA E JURISPRUDÊNCIA DO STF. Revista Jurídica, São Paulo, v.47, n.260, p. 5-25, jun. 1999. Revista de Processo, v.25, n.98, p. 61-81, abr./jun. 2000.
- INTERPRETAÇÃO DO DIREITO ELEITORAL. Revista Trimestral de Jurisprudência dos Estados, v.6, n.19, p. 9-19, abr. 1982.

INTERPRETAÇÃO DOS CONTRATOS REGULADOS PELO CÓDIGO DE PROTEÇÃO AO CONSUMIDOR. Revista Jurídica, São Paulo, v.47, n.263, p. 52-77, set. 1999. Informativo Jurídico da Biblioteca Ministro Oscar Saraiva, v.8, n.2, p. 89-120, jul./dez. 1996.

- INTERPRETAÇÃO CONTEMPORÂNEA DO DIREITO TRIBUTÁRIO E OS PRINCÍPIOS DA VALORIZAÇÃO DA DIGNIDADE HUMANA E DA CIDADANIA. Tributos e Direitos Fundamentais, São Paulo: Dialética, p. 151-173, 2004.
- INTERPRETAÇÃO DO DIREITO ELEITORAL. Revista Trimestral de Jurisprudência dos Estados, Seção de Doutrina, v. 19, p. 9–19, 1982.
- INTERPRETAÇÃO E INTEGRAÇÃO DAS NORMAS JURÍDICAS TRIBUTÁRIAS. Direito Tributário Moderno, São Paulo: J. Bushatsky, p. 97–140, 1977.
- INTERESSES DIFUSOS E COLETIVOS: EVOLUÇÃO CONCEITUAL: DOUTRINA E JURISPRUDÊNCIA DO STJ. Revista Jurídica, São Paulo, v.47, n.260, p. 5-25, jun. 1999. Revista de Processo, v. 25, n.98, p. 61–81, abr./jun. 2000.
- INVERSÃO DE ÔNUS DA PROVA NO CÓDIGO DE DEFESA DO CONSUMIDOR. Visão Jurídica – Universidade Metropolitana de Santos – Faculdade de Direito. 2000.
- JUDICIÁRIO EM XEQUE. Consulex : Revista Jurídica, v.1, n.11, p. 5-9, nov. 1997.
- JUSTIÇA, TRIBUTOS E DIREITOS FUNDAMENTAIS DA PESSOA. Revista Meio Jurídico, n.52, p. 6-11, junho. 2002.
- A JURISPRUDÊNCIA E A LICITAÇÃO. Jurisprudência Brasileira, Cível e Comércio, n.162, p. 52-59, 1991. Separata da Revista Forense, v.313, p. 53-60, 1991.
- A JURISPRUDÊNCIA DO STJ SOBRE O ICMS COBRADO ANTECIPADAMENTE EM REGIME DE SUBSTITUIÇÃO TRIBUTÁRIA. Justiça Tributária, São Paulo: M. Limonad, p. 433–475, 1998.
- HUMANIZAÇÃO DA PENA UM PROBLEMA DE DIREITO PENAL. Universidade Federal do Rio Grande do Norte, 1978.
- LEASING: A POLÊMICA DO VALOR RESIDUAL GARANTIDO. Juruá, v.6, n.134, p. 34-38, ago. 2002.
- LEASING – DOUTRINA E JURISPRUDÊNCIA. Juruá, 2º ed., 2. Tiragem, Atual e Ampl., 2002.
- A LEI DE RESPONSABILIDADE FISCAL E OS TRIBUNAIS DE CONTAS. Interesse Público, v.2, n.7, p. 11-43, jul./set. 2000.
- A LEI DE RESPONSABILIDADE FISCAL E AS VEDAÇÕES IMPOSTAS AOS MUNICÍPIOS. Revista da Escola Superior da Magistratura do Estado de Santa Catarina, p. 87-110, 2000.
- LEI INCONSTITUCIONAL: SUA CARACTERIZAÇÃO. Revista de Direito Público, v.24, n.98, p. 128-133, abr./jun. 1991. Revista Trimestral de Jurisprudência dos Estados, v.15, n.93, p. 9-19, out. 1991. Boletim de Direito Municipal, v.11, n.8, p. 401-407, ago. 1995.
- LEGALIDADE DA GREVE. Revista do Tribunal Regional do Trabalho da 6ª Região – 1968.
- LIQUIDAÇÃO EXTRAJUDICIAL DOS BANCOS: RESPONSABILIDADE CIVIL DOS SEUS ADMINISTRADORES. Revista de Direito Bancário e do Mercado de Capitais, v.2, n.6, p. 24-65, set./dez. 1999. Revista Jurídica, São Paulo, v.48, n.271, p. 50-84, maio 2000.
- MANDADO DE SEGURANÇA AÇÃO DE REPETIÇÃO DE INÉBITO; AÇÃO ANULATÓRIA DECLARATÓRIA DE DÍVIDA; RENÚNCIA AO PODER DE RECORRER À ESFERA ADMINISTRATIVA. Revista de Processo, v.08, n.29, p. 144 a 153, jan/mar. 1983. Revista Jurídica da Procuradoria Geral da Fazenda Estadual, n.3, p. 25 a 33, jul/set. 1991.
- MANDADO DE SEGURANÇA. Vox Legis, v.13, n.154, p. 27 a 35, out. 1981.
- MEDIAÇÃO: UM PROJETO INOVADOR. Brasília: Conselho da Justiça Federal, Centros de Estudos Judiciários, 2003.
- MEDIDA CAUTELAR FISCAL. Revista dos Tribunais, São Paulo, v.83, n.702, p. 33-38, abr. 1994. Revista do Curso de Direito da Universidade Federal de Uberlândia, v.22, n.1/2, p. 141-150, dez. 1993.
- MOLDURA DA EXECUÇÃO CONTRA A FAZENDA PÚBLICA. Revista AJUFE, n.34, p. 26-32, dez. 1992.
- NOTAS E COMENTÁRIOS AÇÃO ORDINÁRIA DE REINTEGRAÇÃO DE POSSE CUMULADA COM ANULAÇÃO DE REGISTRO DE ESCRITURAS PÚBLICAS. Revista Trimestral de Jurisprudência dos Estados, v.11, n.44, p. 65-85, maio/jun. 1987.
- NOVOS ASPECTOS DA EXECUÇÃO FISCAL (LEI Nº 6.830, DE 22 September 1980). Revista dos Tribunais, São Paulo, v.70, n.551, p. 279-285, set. 1981. Vox Legis, v.14, n.158, p. 105-115, fev. 1982. Revista de Processo, v.7, n.25, p. 197-206, jan./mar. 1982.
- OS NOVOS DIREITOS DE TERCEIRA GERAÇÃO: DIREITOS HUMANOS E AMBIENTAIS. O Direito Contemporâneo em Portugal e no Brasil, São Paulo: Saraiva, p. 477–540, 2004.
- A ORDEM PÚBLICA COMO FATOR DE SEGURANÇA. Revista Jurídica Lemi, v.16, n.193, p. 11-24, dez. 1983. Jurisprudência Brasileira, Cível e Comércio, n.83, p. 13-24, 1984. Revista Trimestral de Jurisprudência dos Estados, v.9, n.32, p. 21-35, maio/jun. 1985.
- PARTIDOS POLÍTICOS NO BRASIL. Monografia com 90 páginas, publicada pela Universidade Federal do Rio Grande do Norte – 1972.
- O PENSAMENTO JURÍDICO DE SEABRA FAGUNDES ANÁLISE DE PARTE DE SEUS ESTUDOS. Revista de Direito Público, v.22, n.89, p. 129–142, jan./mar. 1989. Revista Forense, v.82, n.294, p. 81–92, abr./jun. 1986. Separata da R.T.J.E., Editora Vellenich Ltda., v.70, p. 25-50, nov. 1989.
- PERSPECTIVAS DO DIREITO ADMINISTRATIVO PARA O SÉCULO XXI. Boletim de Direito Administrativo, v.11, n.2, p. 73-94, fev. 1995. Revista do Foro, Tribunal de Justiça da Paraíba, v. 100, p. 11–41, 1998. Perspectiva do Direito Público, Editora Del Rey, p. 57-95, 1995.
- PERSPECTIVAS DO DIREITO PARA O TERCEIRO MILÊNIO. Informativo Jurídico da Biblioteca Ministro Oscar Saraiva, v.11, n.2, p. 109-150, jul./dez. 1999. Revista do Foro / Tribunal de Justiça da Paraíba, v.100, p. 11-41, 1998.
- PIS – NATUREZA JURÍDICA. Artigo publicado na Revista da OAB/ DF – 1979.
- O PODER JUDICIÁRIO NA CONSTITUIÇÃO DE 1988: AUTO-EXECUTORIEDADE DOS PRINCÍPIOS A SEREM OBSERVADOS PELO ESTATUTO DA MAGISTRATURA. Jurisprudência Brasileira, Cível e Comércio, n.144, p. 19-21, 1989. Revista de Processo, v.15, n.57, p. 90-93, jan./mar. 1990. Revista Trimestral de Jurisprudência dos Estados, v.14, n.73, p. 9-13, fev. 1990. Revista Forense, v.84, n.304, p. 147-149, out./dez. 1988. Revista AJUFE, v.8, n.25, p. 67-69, set./nov. 1989.
- PODERES, DEVERES E RESPONSABILIDADE DO JUIZ. Vox Legis, v.16, n.185, p. 7-33, maio 1984. Revista Jurídica Lemi, v.17, n.204, p. 3-25, nov. 1984. Jurisprudência Brasileira, Cível e Comércio, v.103, p. 13-29, 1985. Revista Trimestral de Jurisprudência dos Estados, v.10, n.37, p. 25-50, mar./abr. 1986. Revista de Processo, v.11, n.42, p. 37-57, abr./jun. 1986. Revista Forense, v.84, n.301, p. 335-346, jan./mar. 1988. Revista do Curso de Direito da Universidade Federal de Uberlândia, v.17, n.1/2, p. 123-154, dez. 1988.
- PONTOS POLÊMICOS DAS AÇÕES DE INDENIZAÇÃO DE ÁREAS NATURAIS PROTEGIDAS: EFEITOS DA COISA JULGADA E OS PRINCÍPIOS CONSTITUCIONAIS. Revista de Processo, v.26, n.103, p. 9-36, jul./set. 2001.
- PRINCÍPIO DA INSTRUMENTALIDADE, DO CONTRADITÓRIO, DA AMPLA DEFESA E A MODERNIZAÇÃO NO PROCESSO CIVIL. Revista Jurídica, São Paulo, v.49, n.285, p. 31-60, jul. 2001.
- O PRINCÍPIO DA IRREDUTIBILIDADE DE VENCIMENTOS DOS MAGISTRADOS. Vox Legis, v.15, n.169, p. 45-56, jan. 1983. Revista de Processo, v.9, n.34, p. 142-151, abr/jun. 1984. Revista Trimestral de Jurisprudência dos Estados, v.7, n.22, p. 9-21, jan./mar. 1983. Paraná Judiciário, n.5, p. 31-40, jan./mar. 1983. Revista Forense, v.79, n.284, p. 464-470, out./dez. 1983.
- O PRINCÍPIO DA MORALIDADE ADMINISTRATIVA E A CONSTITUIÇÃO FEDERAL DE 1988. Boletim de Direito Administrativo, v.8, n.5, p. 298-309, mai. 1992. Jurisprudência Brasileira, v.164, p. 39-50, out/dez. 1991. Revista Trimestral de Jurisprudência dos Estados, v.16, n.100, p. 19-40, maio 1992. Ciência Jurídica, v.6, n.44, p. 58-74, mar/abr. 1992. Revista Forense, v.88, n.318, p. 55-65, abr/jun. 1992. Revista Trimestral de Direito Público, n.1, p. 208-223, 1993. Síntese Trabalhista, v.5, n.57, p. 38-56, mar 1994.
- PRINCÍPIOS JURÍDICOS APLICADOS À LICITAÇÃO. Boletim de Direito Administrativo, v.10, n.10, p. 609-623, out. 1994.
- PRINCÍPIOS PROCESSUAIS CONSTITUCIONAIS. Jurisprudência Brasileira, Cível e Comércio, n.119, p. 15-20, 1996. Revista Forense, v.82, n.296, p. 93-97, out./dez. 1986. Revista Trimestral de Jurisprudência dos Estados, v.11, n.42, p. 21-30, jan./fev. 1987. Ajuris, v.14, n.39, p. 223-232, mar. 1987. Revista de Processo, v.11, n.44, p. 195-201, out./dez. 1986.
- PRIVATIZAÇÃO VERSUS CONCESSÃO. Boletim de Direito Administrativo, v.12, n.10, p. 639-647, out. 1996.
- O PROCESSO NO SÉCULO XXI. Consulex: Revista Jurídica, v.1, n.11, p. 38-39, nov. 1997.
- PODERES, DEVERES E RESPONSABILIDADE DO JUIZ. Jurisprudência Brasileira, v.100, p. 13-29, 1986. Revista de Processo, n.42, p. 37-57, abr./jun. 1986.
- PROPOSTAS PARA A REVISÃO CONSTITUCIONAL DE 1993. Revista Forense, v.324, p. 69-73, out./dez. 1993. Boletim de Direito Administrativo, v.9, n.1, p. 30-38, jan. 1993.
- PROTEÇÃO JURÍDICA DO PATRIMÔNIO GENÉTICO. Revista de Direito Renovar, n.21, p. 11-34, set./dez. 2001.
- A REALIDADE, A JUSTIÇA E O DIREITO. Consulex: Revista Jurídica, v.7, n.161, p. 10-13, set. 2003.
- RECLAMAÇÃO TRABALHISTA PROFESSOR UNIVERSITÁRIO; INQUÉRITO ADMINISTRATIVO; NULIDADE; ESTABILIDADE ESPECIAL. Revista Trimestral de Jurisprudência dos Estados, v.14, n.74, p. 59-74, mar. 1990.
- REFLEXÕES CONTEMPORÂNEAS SOBRE A PRESCRIÇÃO E DECADÊNCIA EM MATÉRIA TRIBUTÁRIA. DOUTRINA. JURISPRUDÊNCIA DO SUPERIOR TRIBUNAL DE JUSTIÇA. Revista Fórum de Direito Tributário, v.2, n.10, p. 21-89, jul./ago. 2004.
- REFLEXÕES SOBRE A SUBSTITUIÇÃO PROCESSUAL. Revista Trimestral de Jurisprudência dos Estados, v.18, n.122, p. 15-41, mar. 1994. Revista do Curso de Direito da Universidade Federal de Uberlândia, v.23, n.1/2, p. 453-485, dez. 1994. Revista AJURIS 64, p. 162/187. 1964.
- REFLEXÕES SOBRE DIREITO AMBIENTAL E COMPETÊNCIA MUNICIPAL. Cidadania e Justiça, v.4, n.9, p. 32-51, jul./dez. 2000.
- REFLEXÕES SOBRE O MERCADO DE VALORES MOBILIÁRIOS E FUNDOS DE INVESTIMENTOS: ATUAÇÃO DO BANCO CENTRAL E DA COMISSÃO DE VALORES MOBILIÁRIOS. Revista de Direito Bancário e do Mercado de Capitais, v.1, n.3, p. 24-40, set./dez. 1998.
- REFLEXÕES SOBRE O NEGÓCIO JURÍDICO. Revista de Direito Civil, Imobiliário, Agrário e Empresarial, v.7, n.24, p. 54-57, abr./jun. 1983.
- REFLEXÕES SOBRE O ORDENAMENTO JURÍDICO–ADMINISTRATIVO. Revista Trimestral de Jurisprudência dos Estados, v.19, n.135, p. 83-100, abr. 1995.
- REFLEXÕES SOBRE O REGIME TRIBUTÁRIO DAS INDENIZAÇÕES. Regime Tributário das Indenizações / Coordenado por Hugo de Brito Machado, São Paulo, p. 145 – 190, 2000.
- REFLEXÕES SOBRE OS EFEITOS DA TUTELA ANTECIPADA. Revista da Esmape, v.2, n.3, p. 233-260, jan./mar. 1997.
- REFLEXÕES SOBRE O PROCESSO ADMINISTRATIVO TRIBUTÁRIO. Processo Administrativo Tributário / Coordenado por Ives Gandra Martins, São Paulo : Editora Revista dos Tribunais, Pesquisas Tributárias Nova Série – 5, p. 79 – 113, 1999.
- REFORMA ADMINISTRATIVA E TRIBUTÁRIA DO ESTADO: IMPORTÂNCIA E PERSPECTIVAS. Revista CEJ/RN, v.4, n.5, p. 3-20, nov. 1998.
- A REFORMA DO CÓDIGO PENAL (ASPECTOS PARCIAIS). Vox Legis, v.13, n.155, p. 57-64, nov. 1981.

AS RELAÇÕES DO PODER JUDICIÁRIO COM A IMPRENSA E A ESTRUTURA DO PODER JUDICIÁRIO; INSTITUIÇÕES DA JUSTIÇA FEDERAL, COMPETÊNCIA. Boletim de Direito Administrativo, v.9, n.4, p. 216-225, abr. 1993. Revista de Trimestral de Jurisprudência dos Estados, v.105, p. 31-47, out. 1992.

- RESPONSABILIDADE CIVIL DO ESTADO PELA DEMORA NA PRESTAÇÃO JURISDICIONAL. Revista da Amagis, v.1, n.2, p. 169-179, 1983. Revista Jurídica Lemi, v.16, n.191, p. 3-14, out. 1983. Revista da Faculdade de Direito / Universidade Federal do Ceará, v.24, n.2, p. 157-172, jul./dez. 1983. Revista da Amagis, v.1, p. 169-179, 1983. Revista Forense, v.83, n.297, p. 406-410, jan./mar. 1987. Revista de Direito Administrativo, n.153, p. 259-270, jul./set. 1983. Revista de Processo, v.10, n.40, p. 147-156, out./dez. 1985.
- RESPONSABILIDADE DO COMERCIANTE NOS CONTRATOS MERCANTIS. Revista do Sindicato do Comércio Varejista do Rio Grande do Norte –1975.
- RESPONSABILIDADE CIVIL DO ESTADO. Revista do Curso de Direito do Instituto Luterano de Ensino Superior de Santarém, v.2, n.2, p. 03–35, out.1998.
- RESPONSABILIDADE DO ESTADO: ATO JURISDICIONAL. Consulex: Revista Jurídica, v.2, n.16, p. 34–37, abr. 1998.
- RESPONSABILIDADE DO ESTADO: RESPONSABILIDADE CIVIL DO ESTADO OU RESPONSABILIDADE DA ADMINISTRAÇÃO, A DEMORA NA ENTREGA DA PRESTAÇÃO JURISDICIONAL. Revista Jurídica, Porto Alegre, v.44, n.226, p. 5-26, ago. 1996.
- RESPONSABILIDADE TRIBUTÁRIA À LUZ DO NOVO CÓDIGO CIVIL. Revista de Estudos Tributários, v.8, n.38, p. 29-51, jul./ago. 2004.
- A REVITALIZAÇÃO DA MAGISTRATURA. Informativo Jurídico da Biblioteca Ministro Oscar Saraiva, v.9, n.2, p. 107-149, jul./dez. 1997.
- A SENTENÇA JUDICIAL E A CONSTITUIÇÃO FEDERAL DE 1988. Revista Jurídica, Porto Alegre, v.39, n.168, p. 21-27, out. 1991. Revista do Curso de Direito da Universidade Federal de Uberlândia, v.20, n.1/2, p. 247-254, dez. 1991. Revista Forense, v.86, n.310, p. 37-40, abr./jun. 1990. Revista de Processo, v. 16, n. 61, p. 57–62, jan./mar. 1991.
- O SIGILO BANCÁRIO NO ORDENAMENTO JURÍDICO BRASILEIRO. Revista de Direito Bancário, do Mercado de Capitais e da Arbitragem, v.4, n.13, p. 13-52, jul./set. 2001. Consulex: Revista Jurídica, p. 223-268, 2003. Revista da Procuradoria Geral do Estado do Pará, n.5, p. 199-240, jul./dez. 2001.
- OS SIGILOS BANCÁRIOS E FISCAL NO ORDENAMENTO JURÍDICO BRASILEIRO. Interesse Público, v.4, n.15, p. 11-66, jul./set. 2002.
- SISTEMA PROCESSUAL BRASILEIRO E CIDADANIA. Jurisprudência do Superior Tribunal de Justiça, v.1, n.4, p. 23-43, abr. 1999.

SUJEITOS DO PROCESSO. Revista de Processo, v.8, n.30, p. 61-108, abr./jun. 1983.

- A SÚMULA VINCULANTE E A ADMINISTRAÇÃO PÚBLICA. Boletim de Direito Administrativo, v.14, n.6, p. 355-359, jun. 1998.
- PRINCÍPIOS INFORMATIVOS DO DIREITO ADMINISTRATIVO INTERPRETAÇÃO E APLICAÇÃO. Revista dos Tribunais, São Paulo, v.83, n.701, p. 34-44, mar. 1994.
- A SUPREMACIA DOS PRINCÍPIOS NAS GARANTIAS PROCESSUAIS DO CIDADÃO. Revista da Faculdade de Direito / Universidade Federal do Ceará, v.33, n.1, p. 55-73, 1992/1993. Revista de Processo, v.17, n.65, p. 89-103, jan./mar. 1992. Garantias do Cidadão na Justiça, Coordenador Sávio de Figueiredo Teixeira, São Paulo, p. 63–78, 1993. Revista da Associação dos Juízes Federais do Brasil, n.45, p. 10-19, maio/jun.1995. Revista de Informação Legislativa, n.123, p. 35-46, 1994. Separata da Revista Trimestral de Jurisprudência dos Estados, v.129, p. 63-84, out. 1994. Ciência Jurídica – v.49, p. 11-26, jan./fev. 1993.
- A SUPREMACIA DOS PRINCÍPIOS INFORMATIVOS DO DIREITO ADMINISTRATIVO E APLICAÇÃO. Separata da Revista Trimestral de Jurisprudência dos Estados, v.124, p. 9-28, maio.1994.
- TENDÊNCIAS ATUAIS NO DIREITO DE FAMÍLIA. Revista de Direito Civil, Imobiliário, Agrário e Empresarial, v.5, n.15, p. 23-26, jan./mar. 1981.
- A TEORIA DA EMPRESA, A DISCIPLINA NORMATIVA DA ECONOMIA PRIVADA E AS MODERNAS TENDÊNCIAS DO DIREITO COMERCIAL. Revista de Direito Público, v.16, n.65, p. 257-260, jan./mar. 1983.
- TUTELA ANTECIPADA. Consulex: Revista Jurídica, v.1, n.12, p. 42-43, dez. 1997.
- TUTELA DO PROCESSO NA CONSTITUIÇÃO DE 1988: PRINCÍPIOS ESSENCIAIS. Jurisprudência Brasileira, Cível e Comércio, n.143, p. 13-27, 1989. Boletim de Direito Administrativo, v.4, n.12, p. 711-725, dez. 1988. Revista Trimestral de Jurisprudência dos Estados, v.13, n.65, p. 9-31, jun. 1989. Revista da Amagis, v.8, n.18, p. 77-102, jun. 1989. Revista de Processo, v.14, n.55, p. 81-97, jul./set. 1989. Revista Forense, v.85, n.305, p. 51-61, jan./mar. 1989. Revista do Curso de Direito da Universidade Federal de Uberlândia, v.19, n.1/2, p. 335-354, dez. 1990.
