= Adriana Alves (actress) =

Brazilian actress

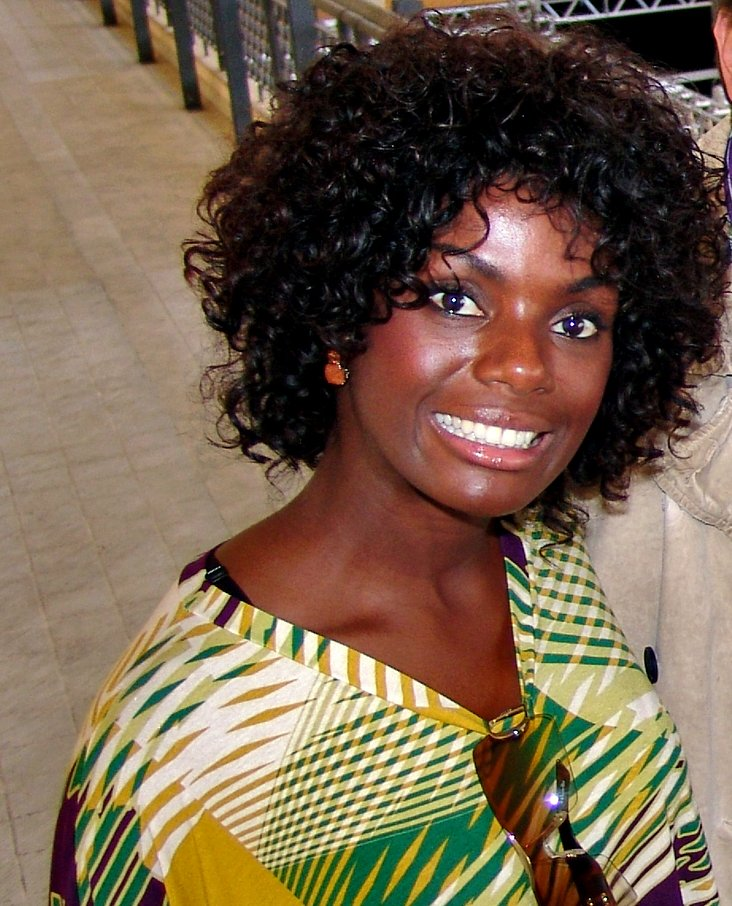
- Born: 12 December 1976 (age 49); São Paulo, Brazil
- Occupations: Actress, model
- Years active: 2000–present
- Spouse: Olivier Anquier (m. 2010)
- Children: 1

Adriana Alves (born 12 December 1976) is a Brazilian actress and former model. She has mainly played roles in Brazilian telenovelas. She is most well known for her role as Palmira Pinto Feijó in Celebridade, for which she won several awards, including the Trófeu Raça Negra and the Top of Business trophy.

== Biography ==
Alves has had various roles in Brazilian film and television, starting her career with the Rede Record novela Turma do Gueto. She later transferred to Rede Globo, where she was an actress in novelas such as Celebridade, Como uma Onda, and Duas Caras. She later acted in films such as The Assailant and O Último Voo do Flamingo. In 2012, she performed as Paula Rivera on the SBT novela Carrossel. She substituted for Thammy Miranda for a brief period on the "Elas Querem Saber" block on Programa Raul Gil.

In 2006, she was the rainha da bateria (queen of the drums) for the São Paulo-based samba school Unidos de Vila Maria. In 2007 and 2008, she was the madrinha da bateria (godmother of drums) for the Pérola Negra samba school.

In 2010, Alves married French-Brazilian chef Olivier Anquier, with whom she had already had a relationship since November 2007. They had a daughter together, Olívia Anquier, on 3 January 2017 in São Paulo.

== Filmography ==
=== Television ===
Year	Title	Role	Notes
2023	A Infância de Romeu e Julieta	Adelaide	
2016	Programa Raul Gil	Herself	Block: "Elas Querem Saber"
2012–2013	Carrossel	Paula Rivera	
2007	Duas Caras	Condessa de Morena Finzi-Contini	
2005	Como uma Onda	Darcy	
2004	Nina e Nuno	Sônia	
2003	Celebridade	Palmira Pinto Feijó	Trófeu Raça Negra, Top of Business Trophy
2002	Turma do Gueto	Pâmela	

=== Film ===
Year	Title	Role
2011	As Doze Estrelas	Walkíria Passos
2010	The Last Flight of the Flamingo	Ana Deusqueira
2009	The Assailant	Oxum
