= Magazine Luiza =

Brazilian retail company

Magazine Luiza S.A.
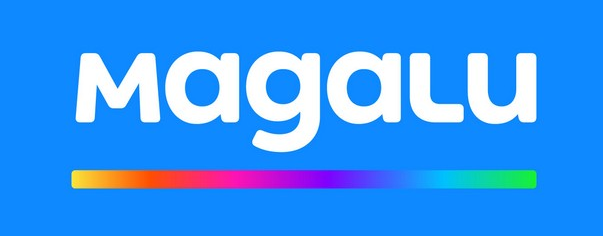
- Type: Sociedade Anônima
- Industry: Retail
- Headquarters: Franca, Brazil
- Key people: CEO: Frederico Trajano; Chair: Luiza Trajano
- Revenue: R$ 56 billion (2021)
- Net income: R$ 590.7 million (2021)
- Website: Official website

Magazine Luiza S.A., also known as Magazine Luiza, or simply as Magalu, is a Brazilian retail company, along with GPA, Viavarejo, Lojas Americanas and others. The current chairperson is Luiza Trajano and the current CEO is her son Frederico Trajano.

== History ==
In 1992, Magalu launched its first “virtual” stores, which at the time were physical retail outlets equipped with multimedia ordering kiosks, which were still in use in 2019.

In January 2016, Frederico Trajano became Magazine Luiza's CEO.

In August 2020, the company acquired Hubsales, a website selling products directly to consumers, Canaltech, a gadget review website, and InLoco Media an advertising company using mobile phone location tracking data.

In November 2020, it was announced that the trainee program would only accept Black Brazilians in order to confront structural racism, in which Black Brazilians are often sidelined.
