= Janete Pietá =

Brazilian politician

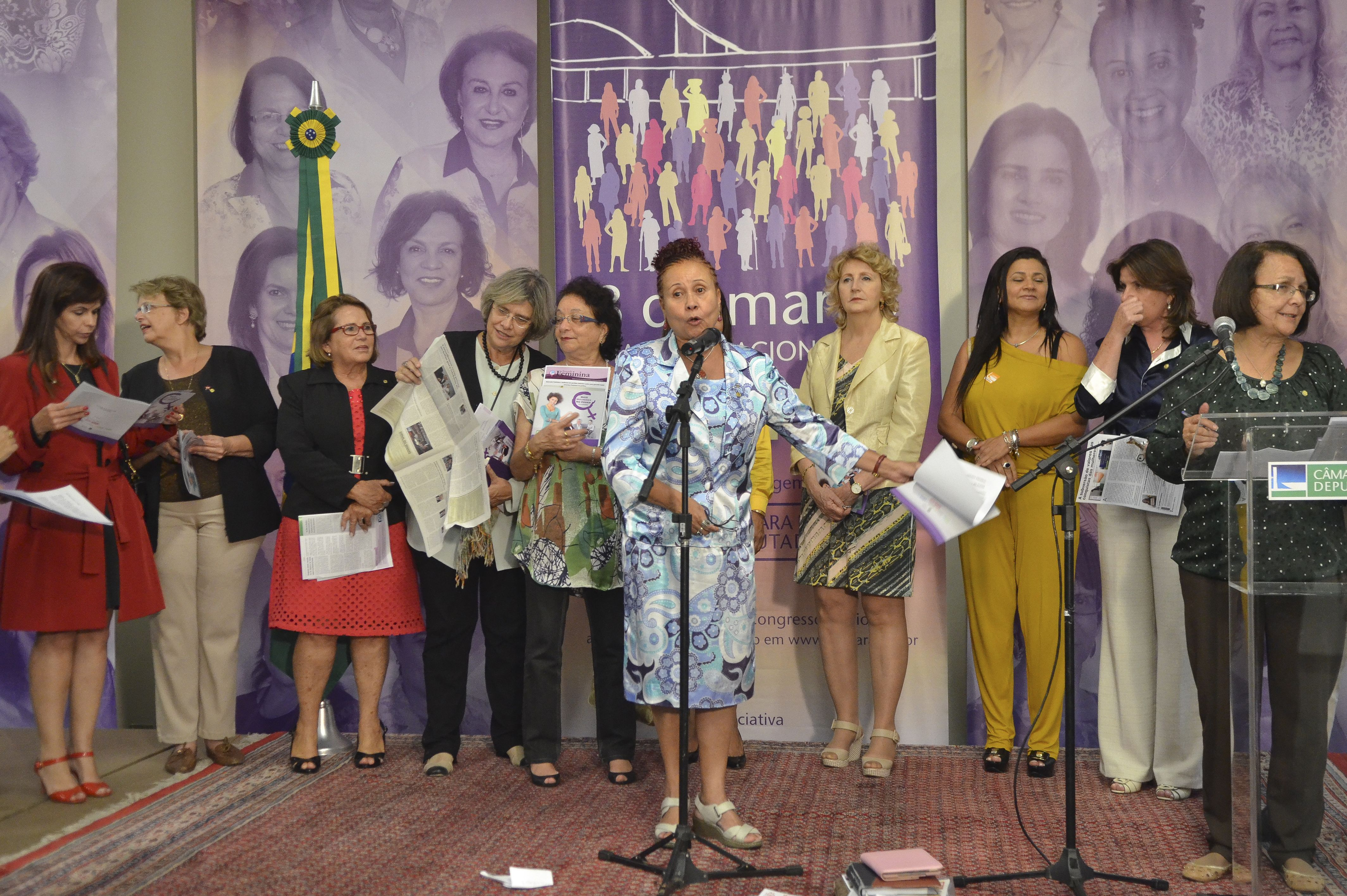

Member, Chamber of Deputies
- In office February 1, 2007 – February 1, 2011
- Parliamentary group: Workers' Party
- Constituency: São Paulo

Member, Chamber of Deputies
- In office February 1, 2011 – February 1, 2015
- Parliamentary group: Workers' Party
- Constituency: São Paulo

City councillor
- Incumbent
- Assumed office January 1, 2017
- Parliamentary group: Workers' Party
- Constituency: Guarulhos

Personal details
- Occupation: Politician

Janete Rocha Pietá is a Brazilian politician, teacher, and architect. She was a member of the Brazilian Chamber of Deputies representing São Paulo for the Workers' Party from 2007 to 2015. In 2016, she was elected to the City Council of Guarulhos.

== Education and early career ==
Pietá studied history at the Universidade Santa Úrsula, graduating in 1971.

In 1971, Pietá became a teacher at the Instituto de Educação Santo Antônio in Rio de Janeiro. From 1972 to 1974, she taught at the Ginásio Cristo Redentor in Belo Horizonte. In 1974 she began to work in machining and quality control in Guarulhos, where she became an industrial production manager. In 1977, Pietá became the first woman to graduate from SENAI, the national service for training in industry. While working in Guarulhos, Pietá became involved in labour organizing, and from 2001 to 2006 she was a Social Action and Solidarity Coordinator in Guarulhos. In 1993, she obtained a license in architecture and urban planning from the Universidade Guarulhos (pt).

== Political career ==
From 2003 to 2005, Pietá was the President of the Food and Nutritional Health Council in the city of Guarulhos. In 2005, Pietá was named Assistant Secretary of Health for the city of Guarulhos, a position she held for the following year.

In 2006, Pietá was elected to the Chamber of Deputies of Brazil representing São Paulo for the Workers' Party, for a term beginning in 2007. This made her the first Afro-Brazilian woman elected to represent São Paulo for the Workers' Party in the Brazilian Chamber of Deputies. Pietá was re-elected in 2011, and she finished her second term in 2015.

In 2016, Pietá was elected a city councillor of Guarulhos for a term starting in 2017, where she also represents the Workers' Party.

As one of the first Afro-Brazilian women elected to federal office, Pietá has been described as a trailblazer for black women politicians in Brazil.
