= Assusete Magalhães =

Brazilian magistrate (1949–2025)

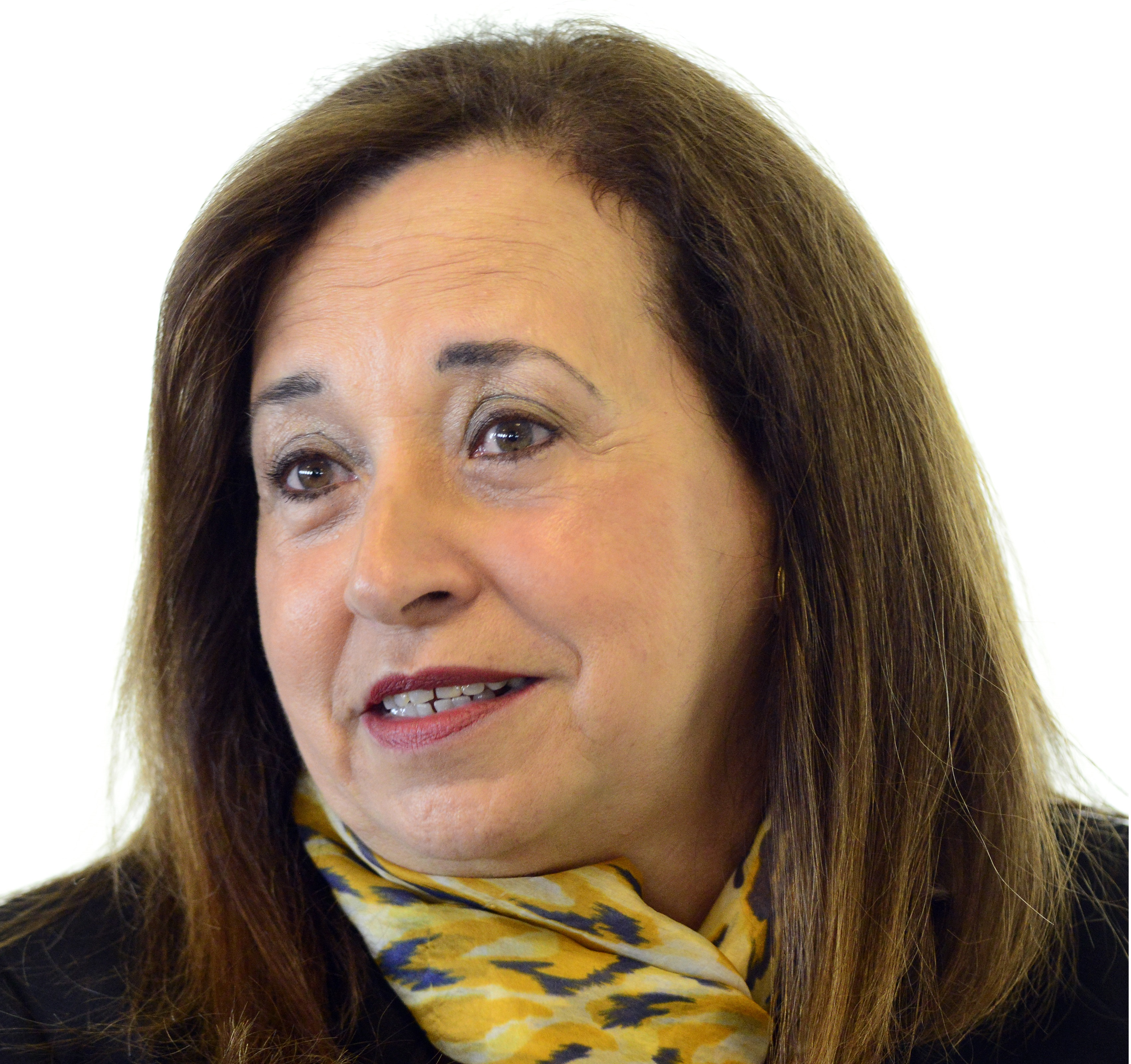
- Magalhães in 2016

Judge of the Superior Court of Justice
- In office 21 August 2012 – 15 January 2024
- Appointed by: Dilma Rousseff
- Preceded by: Aldir Passarinho Junior
- Succeeded by: Carlos Pires Brandão

Personal details
- Born: Assusete Dumont Reis Magalhães; 18 January 1949 Serro, Minas Gerais, Brazil
- Died: 1 December 2025 (aged 76) São Paulo, Brazil
- Education: Federal University of Minas Gerais
- Occupation: Magistrate

Assusete Dumont Reis Magalhães (18 January 1949 – 1 December 2025) was a Brazilian magistrate. She served on the Superior Court of Justice from 2012 to 2024.

Magalhães died in São Paulo on 1 December 2025, at the age of 76.
