= Frederico Trajano =

Brazilian company director (born 1976)

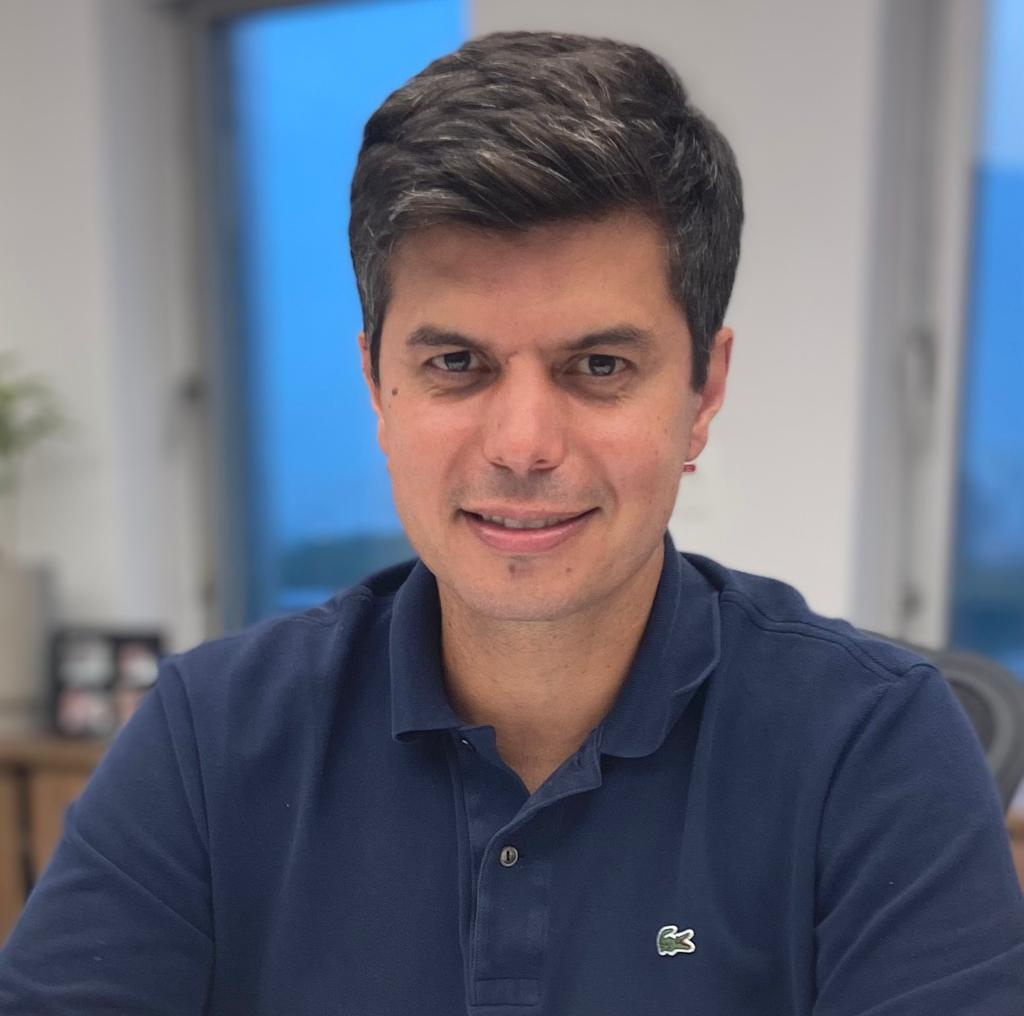
- Born: March 25, 1976 (age 50); Franca, São Paulo, Brazil.
- Education: Fundação Getulio Vargas (MBA)
- Title: CEO Magazine Luiza

Frederico Trajano Inácio Rodrigues (Franca, March 25, 1976) is the CEO of Brazilian retail company Magazine Luiza. Frederico is the son of company owner Luiza Trajano and was appointed CEO in 2016.

== Biography ==
Born in 1976, Frederico is the son of Luiza Trajano and the great nephew of company founder Luiza Trajano Donato. In 1998, Trajano graduated in business administration from Fundação Getúlio Vargas, in São Paulo.

After joining the company in 2001, Trajano sought to integrate the physical and digital stores, resulting in the company being one of the first Brazilian retailers to do so Between 2010 and 2015, Trajano held the position of Operations Director covering the areas of sales, marketing, logistics and technology.

In 2014, Trajano began to be prepared by the company's executive president at the time, Marcelo Silva, for his succession in controlling Magazine Luiza. From January 2016 to September 2017, the market value of the company increased from BRL 392 million to BRL 13.2 billion. In 2017, he received a Leader of Brazil award from LIDE – Grupo de Líderes Businesse.

In 2018, he was included amongst the 16 category winners in the GQ Brasil magazine Man of the Year edition. Also in 2018, he was named one of 23 category winners in the O Valor newspaper's Executivo de Valor 2018 awards. In 2020, Trajano won the Management and Operations category in the E-Commerce Brazil Awards.

In April 2021, Trajano purchased a 25% share of news website Poder360.
