= Leila Velez =

Brazilian entrepreneur

Leila Velez is a Brazilian entrepreneur and the founder of Beleza Natural, a chain of beauty salons. From simple beginnings in Rio de Janeiro, she opened her first salon in 1993, afterwards expanding her enterprise, so that by 2017 the company operated in five states of Brazil, with 45 salons, and employed over 4000 people.

== Career ==
=== Beleza Natural ===
Velez grew up in one of the favelas in Rio de Janeiro, Brazil. She was a daughter of a janitor and worked at McDonald's. Together with Zica Assis, a maid who became a hairdresser, she realized that there is demand in Brazil for means to make women's hair less frizzy. They experimented with herbs and chemicals, and eventually found a recipe that accomplished this. In 1993, they, together with Rogério Assis (Velez's colleague at McDonald's) and Jair Conde (Zica's husband, a former taxi driver), founded Beleza Natural, which grew into the chain of beauty salons. Velez is also the CEO of the company. She was 14 when she started the experiments with hair. The first beauty salon was funded by the money they received by selling Conde's car. In 2005, Velez took the entire leadership team to Disney World as an investigative meetup in order to determine what service methods were used by the conglomerate and what is done to keep customers returning, despite those customers having to wait hours in lines and often in high temperatures.

As of 2017, the company operated in five states of Brazil (45 salons in total) and employed over 4000 people, with the first US location opening in August 2018 in Harlem, New York. The company employs mainly uneducated women, for whom this is their first job, and provides necessary training for them. For their clients from the poorest class, the company organized monthly "Days of beauty" providing free services and some educational activities. That same year, the company partnered with GP Investments, the first time that Beleza had worked with outside funding, in order to finance expansion of the company further outside the country.

Edward Glaeser in his 2011 book Triumph of the City mentions Velez as an example of a success story, when a person from a favela reaches an excellent position in a society. Celebration events and other activist-fueled productions are conducted annually by Velez through funding from Beleza in order to promote the wearing of natural curls among black women and to fight the stigma that leads many to use hair straighteners. One of Velez's goals is to also push for such hair being allowed in business and other settings around the world, in order to fight racism in Brazil toward black women and their natural afro-textured hair.

=== Other activities ===
Velez traveled to the United States in 2010 to participate in the Entrepreneurship and Competitiveness in Latin America (ECLA) program conducted by the Columbia Business School.

== Awards and honors ==
In 2017, Velez was selected by Americas Quarterly for their "Top 5 Young Entrepreneurs" listing, noting that her work is especially influential in Brazil because it "empowers" young women. Other awards she has received include "Female Entrepreneur of the Year" from Endeavor, the "Business Women Award" from Veuve Clicquot, the "Best Entrepreneur of the New Brazil" title from Você SA magazine, and the label of "Young Global Leader" by the World Economic Forum.
