= Luiza Trajano =

Brazilian businesswoman

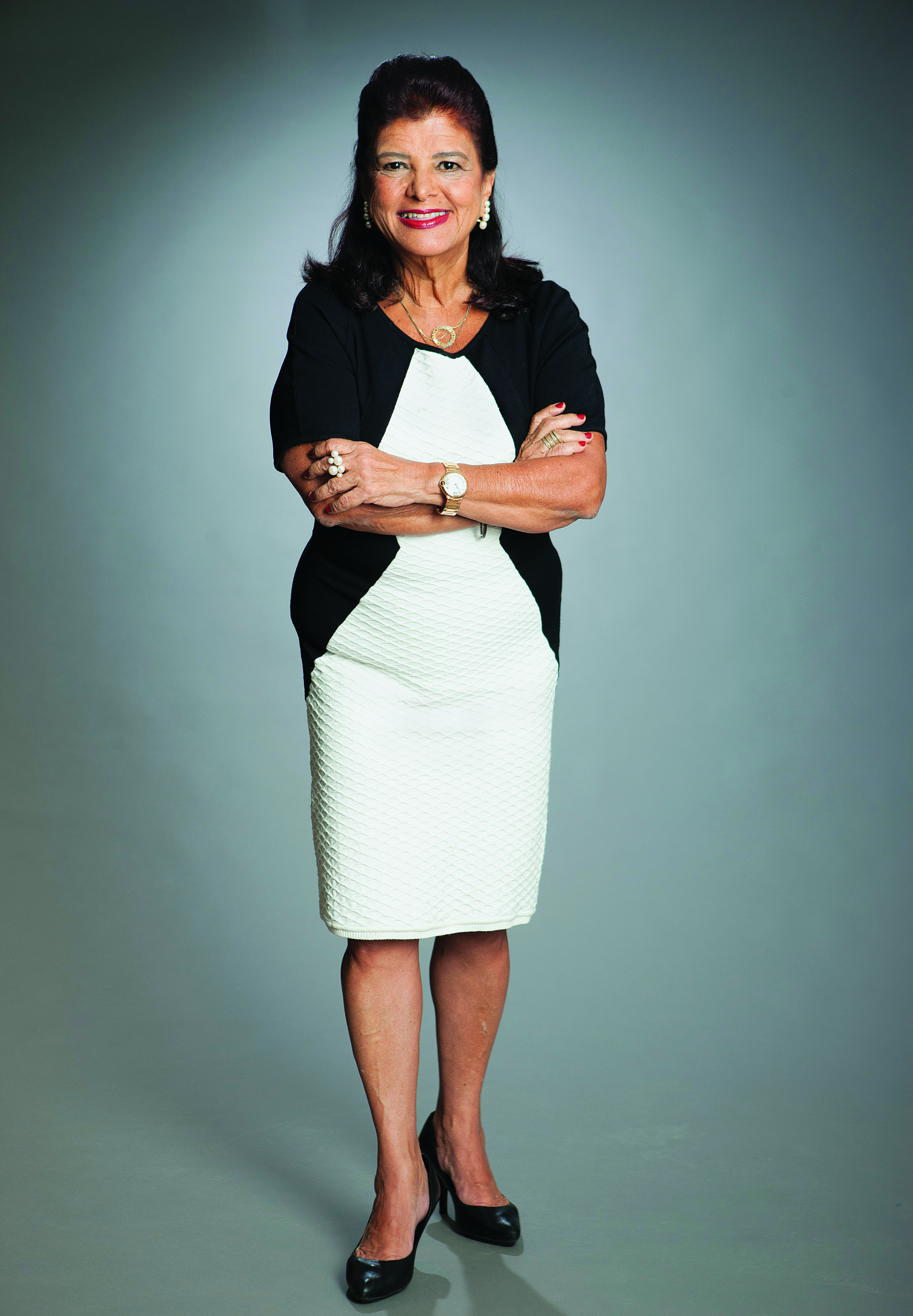
- Trajano in 2013
- Born: Luiza Helena Trajano Inácio; 9 October 1948 (age 77); Franca, São Paulo, Brazil
- Education: Faculdade de Direito de Franca (School of Law of Franca)
- Occupations: Chair, Magazine Luiza
- Spouse: Erasmo Fernandes Rodrigues (died 2009)
- Children: 3

Luiza Helena Trajano Inácio Rodrigues (born 9 October 1948) is a Brazilian businessperson. She is chair of the retailer Magazine Luiza and associated companies. In July 2020, Forbes noted that she was Brazil's wealthiest woman. Trajano is an advisory board member to both UNICEF Brazil and UNFPA Brazil, among other entities. In 2021 Luiza was listed by TIME magazine as one of the 100 most influential people in the world. She is a feminist.

== Life ==
Trajano was born in Franca in the state of São Paulo. She graduated in law from Faculdade de Direito de Franca (School of Law of Franca) in 1972. Trajano's parents (she is the only daughter) owned a retail store in Franca under the brand name Magazine Luiza. Trajano worked in various departments such as sales, purchase and management, prior to becoming the company's director-superintendent in 1991. Under her chairpersonship, Magazine Luiza became a chain of over 1,000 stores scattered throughout 18 Brazilian states with over 18 million clients and 27 thousand employees, as well as a publicly traded company.

During Brazil's 2018 presidential election, Trajano held a Q&A session with several candidates. The eventual winning candidate, Jair Bolsonaro, did not attend. Shortly afterwards, Bolsonaro tweeted 'Who's Luiza Trajano anyway?'. Reports emerged that he had resented being excluded by the organisation for failing to confirm participation in time.

=== Role in promoting women's empowerment ===
Trajano is the chairperson of the non-governmental organisation Grupo Mulheres do Brasil (Women of Brazil), founded in 2013 by 40 Brazilian women entrepreneurs. The organisation is dedicated to promoting equal rights, work, safety, health and education for all. Over 48,000 women across 14 countries are currently associated with Women of Brazil.

In 2017, the femicide of Magazine Luiza store manager Denise Neves dos Anjos, who then was 37 with 13 years of service, by her husband shocked Trajano and made her not only become vocal about domestic violence, but take action within her company, whose workforce is 50% female. Trajano is reported as creating a domestic violence hotline for workers (including male workers), with the company providing counselling and legal assistance, mapping relocation opportunities and alerting the authorities. Also, outsourced workforce providers for Magazine Luiza were required to employ at least 2% of abused women so they could get financial independence which can be an important step towards leaving an abusive husband. "I have asked my friends to report, instead of turning a blind eye...women's condition has made incredible progress, but we still have to fight for equal pay, for instance. And violence is something we cannot tolerate," Trajano said at the time.

Trajano favours quotas for women on company boards, claiming the situation in Brazil is such that it will take 100 years for boards to have 20% or 30% of women if no quotas are adopted. She mentions her aunt (the founder of Magazine Luiza) and late mother as inspirations.

=== Views on and role in affirmative action ===
In September 2020, Magazine Luiza announced its 2021 trainee program would be open to black candidates only. Trajano said it was 'an important step towards consolidating our corporate diversity.' The program will also be waiving English skills and previous work experience requirements. The announcement sparked controversy and met with opposition from conservative quarters. For instance, Jair Bolsonaro's government deputy leader in the Chamber of Deputies said he was personally filing a complaint with the Public Prosecutor's Office on account of 'racism.' According to Trajano: 'Our colour-blind programs never worked...we know people will sue, but we'll keep on track. We will fight and we won't give up that easily.'

In 2019, Trajano had stated racial inequality 'is still a very serious thing.' We have only one Black female chairperson of a major Brazilian corporation...and our struggle now is to have Black female directors, chairpersons...but also males, to have them hold heftier positions within enterprises.' On 21 September 2020, highlighting criticism of the trainee program was expected yet not "as aggressive," she added: "We did not intend to change Brazil, only our company...we respect dissenting points of view...what we feel is it isn't easy for people to understand systemic racism and sexism." And: "We are really happy to break the taboo."

== Awards ==
Trajano was elected Person of the Year 2020 by the Brazilian American Chamber of Commerce.
